= Lyall Cameron =

Scottish footballer

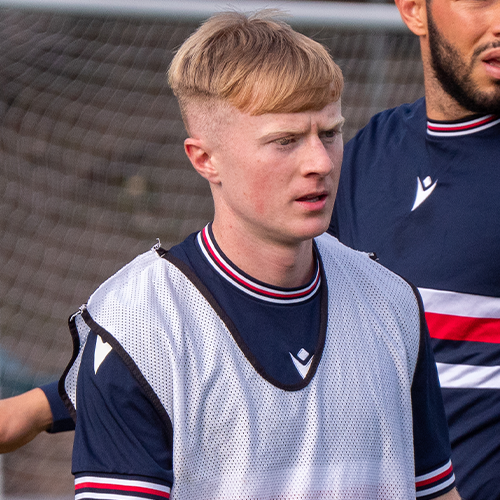
- Cameron for Dundee in 2024

Personal information
- Date of birth: 10 October 2002 (age 24)
- Place of birth: Dundee, Scotland
- Height: 5 ft 11 in (1.80 m)
- Position: Midfielder

Team information
- Current team: Dundee United (on loan from Rangers)
- Number: 16

Youth career
- Dundee United
- 2017–2022: Dundee

Senior career*
Years	Team	Apps	(Gls)
2019–2025	Dundee	94	(22)
2020–2021	→ Peterhead (loan)	11	(3)
2021–2022	→ Peterhead (loan)	13	(0)
2022	→ Montrose (loan)	9	(1)
2025–	Rangers	6	(0)
2026	→ Aberdeen (loan)	14	(0)
2026	→ Dundee United (loan)	2	(1)

International career^{‡}
2023–2024	Scotland U21	12	(2)
- * Club domestic league appearances and goals as of 18:27, 18 May 2026 (UTC) ‡ National team caps and goals as of 22:44, 17 October 2024 (UTC)

Lyall Cameron (born 10 October 2002) is a Scottish professional footballer who plays as a midfielder for Scottish Premiership club Dundee United on loan from Rangers. Cameron played youth football with Dundee United before moving to Dundee and established himself as a first-team regular after 2 loan spells with Peterhead.

== Club career ==
=== Dundee ===
Cameron was put on the bench for Dundee for their final game of the 2018–19 season at home to St Mirren. Despite being due to receive his professional debut, a red card for Darren O'Dea prevented Cameron from getting on, according to manager James McPake. After scoring a game-winning goal in a friendly against Brechin City, Cameron made his competitive debut for Dundee in the Scottish League Cup, coming off the bench in an away win over Raith Rovers. In January 2020, Cameron made his league debut and first professional start in a loss away to Dunfermline Athletic.

==== Peterhead and Montrose loans ====
In October 2020, Cameron signed a new contract with Dundee keeping him at the club until 2023. The next day, he joined Scottish League One side Peterhead on a season-long loan, stating his aim to prove himself with The Blue Toon and help him progress to play for Dundee in the future. Cameron made his debut for Peterhead in an away win against Scottish Premiership side Dundee United in the League Cup. He made his league debut for them the next week against Airdrieonians. Cameron scored his first goal for Peterhead in their next league game the following week against Clyde. In January 2021, following the three-week suspension of League One by the SFA and SPFL due to the worsening COVID-19 situation in Scotland, Cameron was recalled by Dundee. After being recalled from Peterhead, manager Jim McInally praised Cameron's talent and professionalism, considering his spell at the club "as good as it gets when it comes to loan players."

In June 2021, Cameron again joined Peterhead on a season-long loan. Despite this, Cameron represented Dundee B against Peterhead in the Scottish Challenge Cup.

On 25 February 2022, Cameron joined Scottish League One side Montrose on loan until the end of the season. Cameron scored his first goal for the Gable Endies in an away victory over Falkirk. He returned to Dundee at the end of Montrose's season.

==== Emergence at Dundee ====
On 9 July, Cameron scored his first competitive goal for Dundee in a Scottish League Cup victory over Hamilton Academical. On 30 August, Cameron was named man of the match in a win in the same cup against Falkirk. Cameron would again notch a goal and MOTM honours the following month after scoring and playing well in a Scottish Challenge Cup victory away to Welsh champions The New Saints. Cameron scored his first career hat-trick in a 7–0 league victory over Hamilton Academical. In the final league game of the season, Cameron scored the game-winning goal against Queen's Park and won the Scottish Championship with Dundee, and finished as the club's top scorer with 14 goals. At Dundee's end of season awards, Cameron won the Player of the Year, Young Player of the Year and Players' Player of the Year awards, the first time in the club's history that one player has won all three main awards. He would also be named in PFA Scotland's Scottish Championship Team of the Year at the end of the season, as well as being named in the SPFL's Championship Team of the Season.

Despite rumoured interest from teams such as Hearts, Cameron signed a new two-year deal with Dundee, keeping him at the club until 2025. He scored Dundee's equalising goal in their return game to the Scottish Premiership against Motherwell. In April 2024 following another successful season, Cameron was nominated for both the PFA Scotland Young Player of the Year and the SFWA Young Player of the Year. Cameron also won Dundee's Young Player of the Year award for the second straight year.

Cameron started the 2024–25 season with two goals in a 7–1 away victory over Bonnyrigg Rose in the Scottish League Cup group stage. On 4 December, Cameron marked his 100th appearance for Dundee with two goals in a 4–1 home win over Motherwell.

On 3 February 2025, Cameron signed a pre-contract agreement with fellow Scottish Premiership club Rangers and joined them after the completion of his Dundee contract. Cameron finished off his time at Dundee in style, netting 4 goals and an assist in his last 3 games, including 2 goals over St Johnstone on the last day of the season which confirmed the Dees' Scottish Premiership status for next season. After the season's end, Dundee bid farewell to Cameron in the wake of his impending move to Rangers.

=== Rangers ===
On 17 June 2025, Cameron was officially unveiled by Rangers. On 2 August 2025, Cameron made his first appearance for Rangers as a substitute in a league game away to Motherwell. On 12 August, Cameron scored his first goal for Rangers in a UEFA Champions League qualifying match away to Czech club Viktoria Plzeň.

=== Aberdeen ===
On 16 January 2026, Aberdeen signed Cameron on a loan deal from Rangers. He made his debut vs Raith Rovers on 18 January 2026.

=== Dundee United ===
On 1 September 2026, Cameron returned to youth club Dundee United on a season-long loan deal from Rangers.

== International career ==
Cameron was selected for the Scotland under-21 squad in May 2023 for two upcoming friendlies against Norway in June. He would make his international debut on 15 June as a substitute in a goalless draw. Cameron would make his first international start in the reverse fixture 3 days later. Cameron scored his first international goal in November 2023 in an away victory over Belgium in the UEFA U21 Euros qualifiers. He netted again in March 2024 in a 4–1 win over Kazakhstan.

== Career statistics ==
As of 17 May 2026

Appearances and goals by club, season and competition
Club	Season	League			Scottish Cup		League Cup		Continental		Other		Total	
Club	Season	Division	Apps	Goals	Apps	Goals	Apps	Goals	Apps	Goals	Apps	Goals	Apps	Goals
Dundee	2018–19	Scottish Premiership	0	0	0	0	0	0	—		—		0	0
Dundee	2019–20	Scottish Championship	1	0	1	0	1	0	—		0	0	3	0
Dundee	2020–21	Scottish Championship	1	0	0	0	0	0	—		0	0	1	0
Dundee	2021–22	Scottish Premiership	0	0	0	0	0	0	—		—		0	0
Dundee	2022–23	Scottish Championship	27	8	2	0	6	3	—		4 (Note: Appearance(s) in the Scottish Challenge Cup)	3	39	14
Dundee	2023–24	Scottish Premiership	32	5	0	0	4	0	—		0	0	36	5
Dundee	2024–25	Scottish Premiership	33	9	2	2	6	3	—		0	0	41	14
Dundee	Total		94	22	5	2	17	6	—		4	3	120	33
Dundee B	2021–22	—			—		—		—		1	0	1	0
Peterhead (loan)	2020–21	Scottish League One	11	3	0	0	4	0	—		0	0	15	3
Peterhead (loan)	2021–22	Scottish League One	13	0	1	1	4	1	—		0	0	18	2
Montrose (loan)	2021–22	Scottish League One	9	1	—		—		—		2 (Note: Appearances in the Championship play-offs)	0	11	1
Rangers	2025–26	Scottish Premiership	6	0	0	0	0	0	4 (Note: Four appearances and one goal in the UEFA Champions League)	1	0	0	10	1
Aberdeen (loan)	2025–26	Scottish Premiership	14	0	3	0	—		—		0	0	17	0
Career total			147	26	9	3	25	7	4	1	7	3	192	40

== Honours ==
Dundee

- Scottish Championship: 2022–23

Individual

- Andrew De Vries Player of the Year: 2022–23
- Isobel Sneddon Young Player of the Year: 2022–23, 2023–24
- Players' Player of the Year: 2022–23
- PFA Scotland Scottish Championship Team of the Year: 2022–23
- SPFL Championship Team of the Season: 2022–23
- PFA Scotland Young Player of the Year nominee: 2023–24
- SFWA Young Player of the Year nominee: 2023–24
