= 2021–22 Dundee F.C. season =

Dundee
2021–22 season
- Chairman: Tim Keyes
- Manager: James McPake (until 16 February); Mark McGhee (from 17 February)
- Stadium: Dens Park
- Scottish Premiership: 12th (relegated)
- League Cup: Quarter-finals
- Scottish Cup: Quarter-finals
- Top goalscorer: League: Danny Mullen (7); All: Danny Mullen (7)
- Highest home attendance: 11,273 vs. Dundee United, 1 February 2022 (Prem.)
- Average home league attendance: 6,379 (not incl. games with restricted attendances)
Home colours	Away colours	Third colours

The 2021–22 season was Dundee's first season back in the top flight of Scottish football since 2018–19, after winning the previous season's Premiership play-offs. Dundee also competed in both the League Cup and the Scottish Cup.

Dundee were automatically relegated to the Scottish Championship on 11 May 2022.

== Season summary ==
=== July ===
Dundee would top their League Cup group stage with four wins from four, including a 3–0 forfeited win over Ross County on top of wins over Brora Rangers, Montrose and Forfar Athletic to qualify for the Second Round. They ended the month with their first Scottish Premiership game since James McPake's first game in May 2019, with both coincidentally against St Mirren. Dundee would come from behind twice to take a point.

=== August ===
Dundee would suffer a massive defeat away to Celtic, but would rebound strongly in the League Cup Second Round with a home victory over Motherwell. Despite going ahead early against Hibernian, the Dee would require a late equaliser to snatch a point at Dens. The week after, Motherwell would get revenge for their cup defeat with a league win over Dundee, even after going down to 10 men.

=== September ===
After losing captain Charlie Adam in the previous game, Dundee failed to capitalise on a dominant performance at home to Livingston and had to take a goalless draw. They once again failed to find the net and conceded a late goal in the Dundee derby to go bottom of the league. In the League Cup quarter-final a few days later, Dundee again failed to take their chances and suffered defeat to cup holders St Johnstone. Dundee's string of valiant performances marred by impotency in front of goal continued with a tight defeat to league champions Rangers.

=== October ===
After failing to score for four consecutive games, Dundee finally found the back of the net with Ryan Sweeney's header away to St Johnstone, though it did little to change an otherwise horrendous 3–1 defeat. Charlie Adam would return in Dundee's next game against a similarly struggling Aberdeen side, and managed to defeat the Dons in the league for the first time since 2004, though would pay the price of losing midfielder Shaun Byrne to injury. Despite struggling to keep up with in-form Hearts, a late Jason Cummings goal was enough to take a point at Tynecastle. In a key game at home against relegation rivals Ross County however, Dundee's building momentum crashed to a halt after going 4 goals behind in the first half, eventually losing 0–5. Despite this humiliation however, the Dees would bounce back brilliantly with their first away win of the season in Paisley against St Mirren, keeping a clean sheet to boot, though they would lose striker Cillian Sheridan for the season with an Achilles tendon rupture.

=== November ===
Despite showing better fight against Celtic at home, their defensive struggles continued with a 2–4 loss. After a 3-week break, Dundee came back with a bang in a decisive 3–0 win over an in-form Motherwell side, but would once again lose a key player to injury in a big win with defender Lee Ashcroft damaging his hamstring.

=== December ===
Dundee secured back-to-back wins with a 1–0 home win over bogey side St Johnstone, hopping up to 9th place. Their momentum would be inevitably halted at Ibrox Stadium as they were picked apart by Rangers. They would take the lead over Ross County despite losing Charlie Adam again to injury via a Luke McCowan double, but could not hold it together and would suffer defeat in Dingwall. A valiant defensive performance at Easter Road was undone by a freak own goal that would be enough for a Dundee defeat. Dundee would be very short-staffed in their next match against Hearts due to various injuries piling up, a suspension for Ryan Sweeney and Jason Cummings being dismissed from training due to showing up 'unfit to train'. Despite another even game in misty conditions, a late Hearts goal was enough to seal a fourth straight defeat for the Dee. Despite taking the lead early, the tired and depleted side were once again just beaten by Aberdeen. Their remaining games in December were rearranged due to the SPFL moving the winter break forward at the request of the clubs, including Dundee.

=== January ===
Despite their early reprieve, Dundee returned to their miserable run of form with another goalless loss, in particular away from home against Livingston. In a brief break from their losing run in the league, the side were able to reclaim some form with a win, albeit an unconvincing one, away to Scottish League One side Dumbarton in the Scottish Cup. In a crucial game shortly after between the two bottom sides in terrible form, a rather unsurprisingly poor 0–0 failed to separate Dundee from last-placed St Johnstone in Perth.

=== February ===
Dundee would have to accept another scoreless draw and dropping to bottom spot against rivals Dundee United. In yet another vital game in order to try and fend off relegation, Dundee again fell to Ross County and their gap at the bottom would only increase. Despite the previous failures to defeat relegation rivals, the Dark Blues pulled out a gutsy come-from-behind win over Europe-chasing Hearts to lift them off the bottom spot. Dundee continued their improving form by taking their chances against League One side Peterhead in the Scottish Cup 5th round to win 0–3 at Balmoor. Despite the two positive results prior however, manager James McPake was released by the club on 16 February. The next day, Mark McGhee was announced as manager for the remainder of the season. McGhee's first game as manager was an impressive performance against league leaders Celtic, but missed out on a point in the dying minutes. Any optimism that was brought about from their performance at Celtic Park however was swiftly crushed in another battering at home, this time to Livingston in a 0–4 romp.

=== March ===
The side would get their first point under McGhee with a goalless draw at home to Hibs, but failed to take advantage of a Rocky Bushiri red card and a chance to move off the bottom of the table. After again being hit by a mix of injuries and COVID-19 isolation periods, a depleted Dundee ground out another draw away to Motherwell. After two postponed attempts, the Dees finally welcomed St Mirren for their game in hand, but were sucker-punched with a last-minute Buddies goal to slip into near unsalvageable trouble. The Dees would get to forget their league troubles briefly in the Scottish Cup quarter-finals, but would be knocked out by Rangers without much of a fight. In a league rematch with Rangers the following week, Dundee would improve their performance and lead the majority of the game, but eventually falter and lose 1–2, confirming them as being 4 points adrift at the bottom going into April.

=== April ===
Dundee would come back twice from deficits at home to Aberdeen, but they would still fall two points further behind in bottom spot regardless. Despite trailing behind by two the following week in the Dundee derby, Dundee would again make a comeback with two goals in two minutes to earn a point at Tannadice. In a must-win game against second-bottom side St Johnstone, Dundee couldn't take advantage of an early goal and could only muster a point. In another close-fought match at Pittodrie, an Aberdeen penalty was the difference and Dundee stumbled to their eleventh straight winless game, all of which occurring under Mark McGhee.

=== May ===
A miserable performance in Paisley nearly saw Dundee relegated with two games to go, but a last-minute Livingston goal against St Johnstone kept them alive, if only mathematically. The Dark Blues managed to break their 12-game winless streak with a home win over Hibernian to again keep themselves just barely afloat in the league. Despite their late efforts however, a St Johnstone win over Aberdeen the next night would confirm Dundee's relegation. After relegation was confirmed, Dundee would announce that they would not renew Mark McGhee's contract and would look for a new manager for next season. Dundee would end their season in poetic fashion with another late collapse against Livingston.

== Competitions ==
Win Draw Loss Postponed All times are in British Summer Time (BST).

=== Pre-season and friendlies ===
26 June 2021 Friendly	Forfar Athletic	0–3	Dundee	Station Park, Forfar
14:00		Report	Mullen 53'; McMullan 57'; McCowan 59'	Attendance: 200; Referee: Chris Fordyce

3 July 2021 Friendly	Hamilton Academical	0–5	Dundee	New Douglas Park, Hamilton
		Report	Ashcroft; McCowan; Jakubiak; McDaid

6 July 2021 Friendly	Dundee	3–0	Leyton Orient	Dens Park, Dundee
17:00	McGowan 5'; Jakubiak 46'; Ashcroft 49'	Report		Attendance: 500; Referee: Grant Irvine

9 July 2021 Friendly	Dundee	2–2	West Ham United	Dens Park, Dundee
13:00	Adam 15'; McMullan 53'	Report	Baptiste 59'; Bowen 65' (pen.)	Attendance: 500; Referee: Craig Fordyce

=== Scottish Premiership ===
Dundee will play against Aberdeen, Celtic, Dundee United, Heart of Midlothian, Hibernian, Livingston, Motherwell, Rangers, Ross County, St Johnstone, and St Mirren in the 2021–22 Premiership campaign. They will play each team three times, twice at home and once away against half of the teams, and once at home and twice away against the other half. Following this, they will be split into either a top or bottom group of six depending on their result after 33 games, where they will play each team in their group once.

31 July 2021 1	Dundee	2–2	St Mirren	Dens Park, Dundee
15:00	Shaughnessy 44' (o.g.); Cummings 60'; Anderson (red card) 69'	Report	Brophy 4'; McGrath 54' (pen.)	Attendance: 2,300 (restricted); Referee: Craig Napier

8 August 2021 2	Celtic	6–0	Dundee	Celtic Park, Glasgow
15:00	Furuhashi 20', 25', 67'; Rogic 49'; Ralston 84'; Edouard 90' (pen.)	Report	Marshall (red card) 89'	Attendance: 19,660 (restricted); Referee: Euan Anderson

22 August 2021 3	Dundee	2–2	Hibernian	Dens Park, Dundee
12:00	Cummings 11'; McGowan 83'	Report	Boyle 39' (pen.); Porteous 59'	Attendance: 5,295; Referee: Alan Muir

28 August 2021 4	Motherwell	1–0	Dundee	Fir Park, Motherwell
15:00	Watt 34'; Carroll (red card) 79'	Report		Attendance: 4,998; Referee: Willie Collum

11 September 2021 5	Dundee	0–0	Livingston	Dens Park, Dundee
15:00		Report		Attendance: 5,015; Referee: Alan Muir

19 September 2021 6	Dundee United	1–0	Dundee	Tannadice Park, Dundee
12:00	Harkes 81'	Report		Attendance: 12,806; Referee: John Beaton

25 September 2021 7	Dundee	0–1	Rangers	Dens Park, Dundee
15:00		Report	Aribo 16'	Attendance: 8,574; Referee: Bobby Madden

2 October 2021 8	St Johnstone	3–1	Dundee	McDiarmid Park, Perth
15:00	Kane 31', 39'; May 46'	Report	Sweeney 74'	Attendance: 5,097; Referee: Greg Aitken

16 October 2021 9	Dundee	2–1	Aberdeen	Dens Park, Dundee
18:00	Griffiths 49'; McCowan 62'	Report	Ramirez 67'	Attendance: 6,878; Referee: Colin Steven

23 October 2021 10	Heart of Midlothian	1–1	Dundee	Tynecastle Park, Edinburgh
15:00	Souttar 37'	Report	Cummings 83'	Attendance: 17,557; Referee: Gavin Duncan

27 October 2021 11	Dundee	0–5	Ross County	Dens Park, Dundee
19:45		Report	Clarke 18'; Callachan 27'; Hungbo 34'; Charles-Cook 40', 71'	Attendance: 4,883; Referee: David Dickinson

30 October 2021 12	St Mirren	0–1	Dundee	St Mirren Park, Paisley
15:00		Report	Anderson 11'	Attendance: 3,582; Referee: John Beaton

7 November 2021 13	Dundee	2–4	Celtic	Dens Park, Dundee
12:00	Mullen 23'; Ashcroft 67'	Report	Jota 8', 47'; Furuhashi 19', 50'	Attendance: 8,604; Referee: Alan Muir

27 November 2021 14	Dundee	3–0	Motherwell	Dens Park, Dundee
15:00	McCowan 19'; Mullen 26'; Sweeney 49'	Report		Attendance: 4,747; Referee: Craig Napier

1 December 2021 15	Dundee	1–0	St Johnstone	Dens Park, Dundee
19:45	Mullen 39'	Report		Attendance: 5,196; Referee: Andrew Dallas

4 December 2021 16	Rangers	3–0	Dundee	Ibrox Stadium, Glasgow
15:00	Aribo 36'; Sweeney 55' (o.g.); Morelos 70'	Report		Attendance: 49,628; Referee: Alan Muir

11 December 2021 17	Ross County	3–2	Dundee	Victoria Park, Dingwall
15:00	D. Samuel 23'; Mullen 64' (o.g.); Charles-Cook 78'	Report	McCowan 15', 38'	Attendance: 3,122; Referee: Bobby Madden

14 December 2021 18	Hibernian	1–0	Dundee	Easter Road, Edinburgh
19:45	McMullan 34' (o.g.)	Report	Sweeney (red card) 90+3'	Attendance: 13,516; Referee: Gavin Duncan

18 December 2021 19	Dundee	0–1	Heart of Midlothian	Dens Park, Dundee
15:00		Report	Walker 75'	Attendance: 5,874; Referee: Willie Collum

26 December 2021 20	Aberdeen	2–1	Dundee	Pittodrie Stadium, Aberdeen
15:00	Hedges 12'; Ferguson 70'	Report	Griffiths 7'	Attendance: 500; Referee: Nick Walsh

18 January 2022 21	Livingston	2–0	Dundee	Almondvale Stadium, Livingston
19:45	Anderson 46', 56'	Report		Attendance: 1,612; Referee: David Dickinson

26 January 2022 22	St Johnstone	0–0	Dundee	McDiarmid Park, Perth
19:45		Report		Attendance: 4,135; Referee: Bobby Madden

1 February 2022 23	Dundee	0–0	Dundee United	Dens Park, Dundee
19:45		Report		Attendance: 11,273; Referee: John Beaton

5 February 2022 24	Dundee	1–2	Ross County	Dens Park, Dundee
15:00	Rudden 24'; Daley-Campbell (red card) 90+3'	Report	Hungbo 45+1'; Charles-Cook 80'	Attendance: 4,621; Referee: Don Robertson

9 February 2022 25	Heart of Midlothian	1–2	Dundee	Tynecastle Park, Edinburgh
19:45	Simms 21'	Report	Sibbick 51' (o.g.); Mullen 78'	Attendance: 15,527; Referee: Colin Steven

20 February 2022 26	Celtic	3–2	Dundee	Celtic Park, Glasgow
15:00	Giakoumakis 34', 38', 86'	Report	Mullen 26'; Sweeney 60'	Attendance: 58,030; Referee: Gavin Duncan

26 February 2022 27	Dundee	0–4	Livingston	Dens Park, Dundee
15:00		Report	Anderson 6', 21'; Pittman 18'; Fitzwater 65'	Attendance: 4,679; Referee: Bobby Madden

2 March 2022 28	Dundee	0–0	Hibernian	Dens Park, Dundee
19:45		Report	Bushiri (red card) 58'	Attendance: 5,237; Referee: David Munro

5 March 2022 29	Motherwell	1–1	Dundee	Fir Park, Motherwell
15:00	Efford 18'	Report	McMullan 6'	Attendance: 4,435; Referee: Andrew Dallas

9 March 2022 30*	Dundee	0–1	St Mirren	Dens Park, Dundee
19:45		Report	Ronan 90+3'	Attendance: 5,069; Referee: John Beaton
Note: Initially postponed and rescheduled twice due to safety concerns due to high winds and a waterlogged pitch respectively. Original date was 29 January 2022.

20 March 2022 31	Dundee	1–2	Rangers	Dens Park, Dundee
12:00	Elliott 6'	Report	Ramsey 64'; Goldson 86'	Attendance: 7,669; Referee: Bobby Madden

2 April 2022 32	Dundee	2–2	Aberdeen	Dens Park, Dundee
15:00	McGhee 62'; Mullen 86'	Report	Ramsay 41'; McCrorie 82'	Attendance: 7,815; Referee: John Beaton

9 April 2022 33	Dundee United	2–2	Dundee	Tannadice Park, Dundee
15:00	Clark 12'; Mulgrew 55'	Report	Mullen 59'; Adam 61'	Attendance: 10,307; Referee: Steven McLean

23 April 2022 34	Dundee	1–1	St Johnstone	Dens Park, Dundee
15:00	Marshall 10'	Report	Rooney 68'	Attendance: 7,937; Referee: Bobby Madden

30 April 2022 35	Aberdeen	1–0	Dundee	Pittodrie Stadium, Aberdeen
15:00	Ferguson 73' (pen.)	Report		Attendance: 13,747; Referee: Willie Collum

7 May 2022 36	St Mirren	2–0	Dundee	St Mirren Park, Paisley
15:00	Greive 4'; Main 55'	Report		Attendance: 5,564; Referee: David Dickinson

10 May 2022 37	Dundee	3–1	Hibernian	Dens Park, Dundee
19:45	McGinn 3'; Mulligan 67'; Adam 86'	Report	Scott 29'	Attendance: 5,452; Referee: Craig Napier

15 May 2022 38	Livingston	2–1	Dundee	Almondvale Stadium, Livingston
12:00	Shinnie 78'; Forrest 84'	Report	Mulligan 59'	Attendance: 1,629; Referee: John Beaton

==== League table ====
Pos	Team	Pld	W	D	L	GF	GA	GD	Pts	Qualification or relegation (Note: Teams play each other three times (33 matches), before the league is split into two groups (the top six and the bottom six).)
8	Hibernian	38	11	12	15	38	42	−4	45	
9	St Mirren	38	10	14	14	33	51	−18	44	
10	Aberdeen	38	10	11	17	41	46	−5	41	
11	St Johnstone (O)	38	8	11	19	24	51	−27	35	Qualification for the Premiership play-off final
12	Dundee (R)	38	6	11	21	34	64	−30	29	Relegation to Championship

Rules for classification: 1) Points; 2) Goal difference; 3) Goals scored; 4) Head-to-head points; 5) Head-to-Head goal difference; 6) Play-off (only if deciding champion, UEFA competitions qualification, second stage group allocation or relegation).
(O) Play-off winners; (R) Relegated

==== Results by round ====
Round	1	2	3	4	5	6	7	8	9	10	11	12	13	14	15	16	17	18	19	20	21	22	23	24	25	26	27	28	29	30	31	32	33	34	35	36	37	38
Ground	H	A	H	A	H	A	H	A	H	A	H	A	H	H	H	A	A	A	H	A	A	A	H	H	A	A	H	H	A	H	H	H	A	H	A	A	H	A
Result	D	L	D	L	D	L	L	L	W	D	L	W	L	W	W	L	L	L	L	L	L	D	D	L	W	L	L	D	D	L	L	D	D	D	L	L	W	L
Position	5	11	9	10	9	12	12	12	11	11	11	11	11	11	9	9	10	10	11	11	11	11	12	12	11	12	12	12	12	12	12	12	12	12	12	12	12	12

Updated to match(es) played on 8 August 2021. Source: Competitive matches
A = Away; H = Home; W = Win; D = Draw; L = Loss

=== Scottish Cup ===
Dundee entered the competition in the 4th round.

22 January 2022 Fourth round	Dumbarton	0–1	Dundee	Dumbarton Football Stadium, Dumbarton
15:00	MacLean (red card) 44'	Report	Griffiths 63' (pen.)	Attendance: 1,198; Referee: Colin Steven

14 February 2022 Fifth round	Peterhead	0–3	Dundee	Balmoor Stadium, Peterhead
19:45		Report	Adam 33' (pen.); McGinn 53'; Mulligan 88'	Attendance: 1,598; Referee: David Munro

13 March 2022 Quarter-finals	Dundee	0–3	Rangers	Dens Park, Dundee
16:00		Report	Goldson 9'; Tavernier 25' (pen.); Sakala 87'	Attendance: 5,536; Referee: Steven McLean

=== Scottish League Cup ===
Dundee were a 2nd seed in the group stage draw which took place on 28 May at 13:00 on FreeSports and the SPFL's YouTube channel. Dundee were drawn into Group C along with Ross County, Forfar Athletic, Montrose, and Brora Rangers.

==== Group stage ====
13 July 2021 1	Dundee	4–0	Brora Rangers	Dens Park, Dundee
19:45	McGowan 24'; McMullan 34', 49'; Jakubiak 51'	Report		Attendance: 327 (restricted); Referee: David Dickinson

18 July 2021 2	Ross County	0–3 (awarded)	Dundee	Victoria Park, Dingwall
15:00		Report

21 July 2021 3	Montrose	0–2	Dundee	Links Park, Montrose
19:45		Report	Cummings 70' (pen.); McCowan 73'	Attendance: 1,090 (restricted); Referee: Alan Newlands

24 July 2021 4	Dundee	5–2	Forfar Athletic	Dens Park, Dundee
15:00	Adam 12'; Panter 31'; Elliott 42'; Cummings 75' (pen.), 88'	Report	McCluskey 62'; G. Anderson 81'	Attendance: 771 (restricted); Referee: Grant Irvine

Notes

1. A: Dundee were awarded a technical 3−0 win over Ross County who were unable to raise a team after a COVID-19 outbreak.

==== Knockout stage ====
14 August 2021 Second round	Dundee	1–0	Motherwell	Dens Park, Dundee
15:00	Ashcroft 78'	Report		Attendance: 3,603; Referee: Kevin Clancy

22 September 2021 Quarter-finals	Dundee	0–2	St Johnstone	Dens Park, Dundee
19:45		Report	Rooney 70'; Crawford 84'	Attendance: 4,707; Referee: Steven McLean

==== Group C table ====
Pos	Team	Pld	W	PW	PL	L	GF	GA	GD	Pts	Qualification	DUN	FOR	ROS	MON	BRO
1	Dundee	4	4	0	0	0	14	2	+12	12	Qualification for the second round	—	5–2	—	—	4–0
2	Forfar Athletic	4	2	1	0	1	6	5	+1	8		—	—	3–0 (Note: Forfar Athletic were awarded a technical 3−0 win over Ross County, who were unable to raise a team after a COVID-19 outbreak among players and staff.)	p0–0	—
3	Ross County	4	2	0	0	2	5	7	−2	6		0–3 (Note: Dundee were awarded a technical 3−0 win over Ross County, who were unable to raise a team after a COVID-19 outbreak among players and staff.)	—	—	4–1	—
4	Montrose	4	1	0	1	2	4	6	−2	4		0–2	—	—	—	3–0
5	Brora Rangers	4	0	0	0	4	0	9	−9	0		—	0–1	0–1	—	—

Rules for classification: 1) goal difference, 2) goals scored, 3) away goals scored, 4) matches won, 5) away matches won, 6) drawing of lots.

== Squad statistics ==
As of

No.	Pos	Nat	Player	Total		Premiership		Scottish Cup		League Cup	
No.	Pos	Nat	Player	Apps	Goals	Apps	Goals	Apps	Goals	Apps	Goals
1	GK	(England) ENG	Adam Legzdins	29	0	24	0	0	0	5	0
2	DF	(Scotland) SCO	Cammy Kerr	41	0	35	0	3	0	3	0
3	DF	(England) ENG	Jordan Marshall	35	1	29+1	1	1	0	4	0
4	DF	(England) ENG	Liam Fontaine	24	0	15+4	0	0	0	5	0
5	DF	(Republic of Ireland) IRL	Ryan Sweeney	38	3	33+2	3	3	0	0	0
6	DF	(Scotland) SCO	Jordan McGhee	41	1	30+4	1	3	0	4	0
8	MF	(Scotland) SCO	Shaun Byrne	31	0	21+3	0	2+1	0	4	0
9	FW	(Scotland) SCO	Danny Mullen	29	7	19+6	7	3	0	1	0
10	MF	(Scotland) SCO	Paul McGowan	36	2	23+5	1	2+1	0	3+2	1
11	MF	(Scotland) SCO	Declan McDaid	11	0	3+4	0	0+1	0	0+3	0
12	MF	(Canada) CAN	Jay Chapman	2	0	0+2	0	0	0	0	0
14	DF	(Scotland) SCO	Lee Ashcroft	22	2	15+1	1	1	0	5	1
15	MF	(Scotland) SCO	Josh Mulligan	13	3	5+6	2	1+1	1	0	0
16	DF	(England) ENG	Christie Elliott	18	2	9+4	1	1+1	0	2+1	1
17	FW	(Scotland) SCO	Luke McCowan	36	5	17+12	4	1+2	0	1+3	1
18	MF	(Scotland) SCO	Paul McMullan	44	3	34+2	1	2+1	0	5	2
19	MF	(Scotland) SCO	Finlay Robertson	5	0	1+1	0	0	0	1+2	0
20	FW	(Scotland) SCO	Zak Rudden	13	1	8+5	1	0	0	0	0
21	GK	(Republic of Ireland) IRL	Ian Lawlor	10	0	8	0	2	0	0	0
22	DF	(England) ENG	Vontae Daley-Campbell	10	0	5+4	0	0+1	0	0	0
23	FW	(Republic of Ireland) IRL	Cillian Sheridan	11	0	2+7	0	0	0	0+2	0
24	MF	(Scotland) SCO	Max Anderson	40	1	28+5	1	3	0	2+2	0
26	MF	(Scotland) SCO	Charlie Adam	33	4	21+6	2	1+1	1	4	1
30	GK	(Scotland) SCO	Harrison Sharp	7	0	6	0	1	0	0	0
35	DF	(England) ENG	Zeno Ibsen Rossi	4	0	3	0	1	0	0	0
40	MF	(Scotland) SCO	Cammy Blacklock	0	0	0	0	0	0	0	0
41	GK	(Scotland) SCO	Thomas Welsh	0	0	0	0	0	0	0	0
46	DF	(Scotland) SCO	Craig Donald	0	0	0	0	0	0	0	0
48	MF	(Scotland) SCO	Callum Lamb	0	0	0	0	0	0	0	0
77	FW	(Northern Ireland) NIR	Niall McGinn	17	2	9+6	1	2	1	0	0
Players away from the club on loan:
7	FW	(Scotland) SCO	Alex Jakubiak	10	1	2+5	0	0	0	3	1
25	MF	(Scotland) SCO	Lyall Cameron	0	0	0	0	0	0	0	0
27	MF	(England) ENG	Luke Strachan	0	0	0	0	0	0	0	0
28	DF	(Scotland) SCO	Sam Fisher	0	0	0	0	0	0	0	0
42	DF	(Scotland) SCO	Ewan Murray	0	0	0	0	0	0	0	0
44	DF	(Scotland) SCO	Jack Wilkie	0	0	0	0	0	0	0	0
—	DF	(Scotland) SCO	Danny Strachan	0	0	0	0	0	0	0	0
Players who left the club during the season:
20	DF	(England) ENG	Corey Panter	2	1	1	0	0	0	1	1
29	FW	(Scotland) SCO	Leigh Griffiths	17	3	9+6	2	0+1	1	1	0
35	FW	(Australia) AUS	Jason Cummings	18	6	4+10	3	0	0	2+2	3

== Transfers ==
=== Summer ===
==== Players in ====
Date	Player	From	Fee
1 June 2021	(Scotland) Luke McCowan	(Scotland) Ayr United	Free
11 June 2021	(Scotland) Paul McMullan	(Scotland) Dundee United	Free
16 June 2021	(Republic of Ireland) Ryan Sweeney	(England) Mansfield Town	Free
11 July 2021	(England) Corey Panter	(England) Luton Town	Loan
19 July 2021	(Republic of Ireland) Ian Lawlor	(England) Doncaster Rovers	Free
19 July 2021	(Republic of Ireland) Cillian Sheridan	(Poland) Wisła Płock	Free
31 August 2021	(Scotland) Leigh Griffiths	(Scotland) Celtic	Loan

==== Players out ====
Date	Player	To	Fee
17 June 2021	(Scotland) Lyall Cameron	(Scotland) Peterhead	Loan
17 June 2021	(Scotland) Josh Mulligan	(Scotland) Peterhead	Loan
2 July 2021	(Scotland) Danny Strachan	(Scotland) Peterhead	Loan
12 July 2021	(Scotland) Sam Fisher	(Scotland) Forfar Athletic	Loan
12 July 2021	(England) Luke Strachan	(Scotland) Forfar Athletic	Loan

=== Winter & end of season ===
==== Players in ====
Date	Player	From	Fee
12 January 2022	(Canada) Jay Chapman	(United States) Inter Miami	Free
17 January 2022	(Scotland) Declan McDaid	(Scotland) Falkirk	Return from loan
17 January 2022	(Scotland) Josh Mulligan	(Scotland) Peterhead	Return from loan
17 January 2022	(Scotland) Finlay Robertson	(Scotland) Cove Rangers	Return from loan
24 January 2022	(Northern Ireland) Niall McGinn	(Scotland) Aberdeen	Free
29 January 2022	(Scotland) Sam Fisher	(Scotland) Forfar Athletic	Return from loan
31 January 2022	(Scotland) Zak Rudden	(Scotland) Partick Thistle	Loan
31 January 2022	(England) Vontae Daley-Campbell	(England) Leicester City	Loan
9 February 2022	(England) Zeno Ibsen Rossi	(England) AFC Bournemouth	Loan

==== Players out ====
Date	Player	To	Fee
18 September 2021	(Scotland) Declan McDaid	(Scotland) Falkirk	Loan
24 September 2021	(Scotland) Finlay Robertson	(Scotland) Cove Rangers	Loan
2 January 2022	(England) Corey Panter	(England) Luton Town	Return from loan
23 January 2022	(Australia) Jason Cummings	(Australia) Central Coast Mariners	Free
31 January 2022	(Scotland) Alex Jakubiak	(Scotland) Partick Thistle	Loan
31 January 2022	(Scotland) Leigh Griffiths	(Scotland) Celtic	Return from loan
3 February 2022	(Scotland) Sam Fisher	(Scotland) Forfar Athletic	Loan
25 February 2022	(Scotland) Lyall Cameron	(Scotland) Montrose	Loan
Players released at end of season:
31 May 2022	(England) Vontae Daley-Campbell	(England) Leicester City	Loan ended
31 May 2022	(England) Zeno Ibsen Rossi	(England) AFC Bournemouth	Loan ended
31 May 2022	(England) Liam Fontaine	(Scotland) Edinburgh	End of contract
31 May 2022	(Scotland) Danny Mullen	(Scotland) Partick Thistle	End of contract
31 May 2022	(Scotland) Declan McDaid	(Republic of Ireland) Bohemians	End of contract
31 May 2022	(England) Christie Elliott	Retired	End of contract
31 May 2022	(Scotland) Charlie Adam	Retired	End of contract

== End of season awards ==
=== Club Player of the Year awards ===
- Andrew De Vries Player of the Year: Ryan Sweeney
- Isobel Sneddon Young Player of the Year: Max Anderson
- Players' Player of the Year: Ryan Sweeney

== See also ==
- List of Dundee F.C. seasons
