= Sam Fisher (footballer) =

Sam Fisher may refer to:

- Sam Fisher (Australian footballer) (born 1982), Australian rules footballer for St Kilda
- Sam Fisher (Scottish footballer) (born 2001), association football player for Dundee
