= Alex Jakubiak =

English footballer (born 1996)

Personal information
- Full name: Alexander Louis Jakubiak
- Date of birth: 27 August 1996 (age 30)
- Place of birth: Westminster, England
- Height: 1.77 m (5 ft 10 in)
- Position: Striker

Team information
- Current team: Al Ittihad
- Number: 14

Youth career
- 2010–2014: Watford

Senior career*
Years	Team	Apps	(Gls)
2014–2020	Watford	1	(0)
2014	→ Braintree Town (loan)	11	(1)
2014	→ Oxford United (loan)	9	(1)
2014–2015	→ Dagenham & Redbridge (loan)	23	(4)
2016–2017	→ Fleetwood Town (loan)	3	(0)
2017	→ Wycombe Wanderers (loan)	10	(1)
2018	→ Falkirk (loan)	14	(5)
2018–2019	→ Bristol Rovers (loan)	38	(2)
2019–2020	→ Gillingham (loan)	24	(6)
2020	→ St Mirren (loan)	7	(0)
2020–2023	Dundee	31	(6)
2022	→ Partick Thistle (loan)	11	(1)
2023–2024	Dunfermline Athletic	27	(2)
2025	Partick Thistle	5	(1)
2026–	Al Ittihad		

International career
2014	Scotland U19	2	(0)
- * Club domestic league appearances and goals as of 23:47, 4 June 2025 (UTC)

Alexander Louis Jakubiak (born 27 August 1996) is a professional footballer who plays as a striker for UAE Second Division League club Al Ittihad.

Jakubiak made his sole appearance for Watford shortly before his graduation from the club's academy in the summer of 2014. Since then he has had loan spells at Braintree Town, Oxford United, Dagenham & Redbridge, Fleetwood Town, Wycombe Wanderers, Falkirk, Bristol Rovers, Gillingham and St Mirren. He would then play with Dundee for three seasons, winning the Scottish Championship with them and had a loan spell with Partick Thistle. After Dundee, Jakubiak spent one season with Dunfermline Athletic and then had a short-term spell back permanently with Partick Thistle. Jakubiak played twice for the Scotland under-19 team in 2014.

== Club career ==
=== Watford ===
Having originally joined the club as an Under-15, Jakubiak signed a scholarship deal with Watford in May 2012. In his first year, Jakubiak's strike against Peterborough United's academy side won the January 2013 League Football Education Goal of the Month award.

On 11 March 2014, towards the end of his scholarship, Jakubiak was loaned to Braintree Town, joining his Watford teammate Bernard Mensah at the Conference side. His loan spell ran until 13 April, but in that time he made 11 appearances, including two starts, and scored one goal, on his debut against Wrexham. Jakubiak was subsequently involved in Watford's final three games of the 2013–14 season. He was an unused substitute in games against Derby County and Charlton Athletic before making his debut from the start in Watford's defeat at home to Huddersfield Town on 3 May 2014.

Six days after making his Watford debut, Jakubiak signed his first professional contract, a two-year deal with Watford having a further option for an additional year. Despite reporting a two-year deal in 2014, at the conclusion of the 2014–15 season Watford announced Jakubiak had signed a new one-year contract with the club. In June 2016 Watford reported they had taken up their option of a further year on Jakubiak's contract, but in August they announced that he had now signed a new four-year contract with the club.

On 23 June 2020, Watford announced that they would not be offering Jakubiak a new contract.

=== Professional-era loan spells ===
On 13 August 2014, Jakubiak moved on loan to League Two side Oxford United until 4 January 2015. He made his debut as a substitute in a 2–1 defeat to Mansfield Town on 16 August 2014. Jakubiak scored his first Oxford United goal, on his first start, in their game against Dagenham & Redbridge on 30 August 2014. After three months at the club, he was recalled by Watford on 4 November.

On 27 November 2014, he joined League Two side Dagenham & Redbridge on a one-month-long youth loan. Jakubiak scored on his debut the next day, on 28 November 2014, in a 2–0 win over Bury. His loan spell was extended on 31 January 2015. The day Jakubiak's loan spell expired, Jakubiak scored his second goal for Dagenham & Redbridge, in a 3–1 win over Cheltenham Town. After that, Jakubiak's loan spell with the club was extended further until the end of the season. Jakubiak then scored his third goal of the season, in a 3–1 loss against Burton Albion on 21 February 2015 and two months later on 18 April 2015, Jakubiak scored, in a 3–2 win over Newport County. Jakubiak made 23 appearances and scored four times for the club.

On 31 August 2016, Jakubiak joined Fleetwood Town on loan until January of the 2016–17 season. He scored his first goal for the club in an EFL Trophy tie against Carlisle United on 9 November 2016. Although he originally joined for the duration of the season, he was recalled by Watford in January 2017 after an injury crisis at the club.

On 30 January 2017, Jakubiak joined Wycombe Wanderers on loan until the end of the 2016–17 season. In January 2018, he moved on loan to Scottish Championship club Falkirk.

On 9 August 2018 Jakubiak moved on loan to League One side Bristol Rovers for the 2018–19 season. He opened his account for Bristol Rovers in an EFL Trophy tie against West Ham Under-21s on 18 September. He made 38 league appearances for the club, 26 off the bench, scoring twice. In July 2019 Jakubiak joined League One club Gillingham on a season-long loan deal. Despite leaving the club in January he ended the season as the Kent side's top goalscorer in the league with six goals.

In January 2020, Jakubiak left Gillingham, and joined Scottish Premiership side St Mirren on loan until the end of the season.

=== Dundee ===
In August 2020, Jakubiak signed a two-year deal with Scottish Championship side Dundee. Jakubiak picked up an ankle injury in a pre-season win against Peterhead that would sideline him for several weeks. Jakubiak would make his return from injury and first competitive appearance for Dundee as a substitute against Ayr United. In December, during a league game against Inverness Caledonian Thistle, Jakubiak picked up a tendon issue in his thigh, which would leave him out of action for a few months. He would once again return to the pitch in a home win against Raith Rovers.

After achieving promotion with the club, Jakubiak would score his first competitive goal for Dundee the following season in the Scottish League Cup in July 2021. In September, Jakubiak was injured once again in bizarre fashion, suffering a dislocated shoulder during an altercation at a Dundee nightclub. The injury would require surgery, which would again leave him out of action for the remainder of the year.

On 31 January 2022, Jakubiak signed a one-year contract extension with Dundee and joined Scottish Championship side Partick Thistle on loan until the end of the season.

Jakubiak would score with his first competitive touch of the ball of the 2022–23 season for Dundee, converting from the penalty spot in a Scottish League Cup win over Hamilton Academical. He would go on to have a very successful start to the season, scoring four goals in four League Cup group stage games including a brace against Forfar Athletic. After hamstring and thigh issues respectively early in the season, Jakubiak returned to action for Dundee as a substitute in a home league victory over Ayr United in October. Jakubiak would finally score his first league goal for Dundee on 28 January 2023 as a substitute in a 3–0 win over league leaders Queen's Park, in which he also set up the opener. After years of injury disappointment, Jakubiak would form a successful striking partnership with Zach Robinson and would have a massive impact for Dundee, scoring 10 goals in 30 games including the opener in their Scottish Championship title-clinching win away to Queen's Park. On 31 May 2023, Dundee announced Jakubiak had not been offered a new contract and would leave the club.

=== Dunfermline Athletic ===
On 8 September 2023, after spending several weeks training with the club, Jakubiak reunited with former manager James McPake and joined Scottish Championship club Dunfermline Athletic on a deal until the end of the season. He made his debut the following week as a substitute in an away league win against Queen's Park. Jakubiak would open his scoring account for the Pars on 30 December, netting a brace away to Ayr United. On 19 March 2024, Jakubiak was named to the SPFL's Team of the Week after a strong performance in a league win over leaders Dundee United. On 21 May 2024, Dunfermline announced that Jakubiak would leave the club upon expiry of his contract.

=== Partick Thistle return ===
Three years after his initial loan spell, Jakubiak returned to Partick Thistle in February 2025, signing a short-term deal until the end of the season.

On 11 March, Jakubiak made his second Partick Thistle debut off the bench and scored in a 2–0 away win over Queens Park. On 4 June, Thistle confirmed Jakubiak had left the club.

=== Al Ittihad ===
Jakubiak joined UAE Second Division League club Al Ittihad in 2026.

== International career ==
Born in Westminster, England, Jakubiak was monitored by Scotland national team's John Collins, over his eligibility to play for Scotland or Poland, due to his Polish ancestry.

On 22 August 2014, Jakubiak was called by the Scotland U19 squad. He made his Scotland U19 debut, where he came on as a substitute for Harry Cardwell in the 56th minute, in a 2–2 draw against Czech Republic U19.

== Career statistics ==
As of match played 16 May 2025

Appearances and goals by club, season and competition
Club	Season	League			National cup		League cup		Other		Total	
Club	Season	Division	Apps	Goals	Apps	Goals	Apps	Goals	Apps	Goals	Apps	Goals
Watford	2013–14	Championship	1	0	0	0	0	0	—		1	0
Watford	2014–15	Championship	0	0	0	0	0	0	—		0	0
Watford	2015–16	Premier League	0	0	0	0	0	0	—		0	0
Watford	2016–17	Premier League	0	0	0	0	0	0	—		0	0
Watford	2017–18	Premier League	0	0	0	0	0	0	—		0	0
Watford	2018–19	Premier League	0	0	0	0	0	0	—		0	0
Watford	2019–20	Premier League	0	0	0	0	0	0	—		0	0
Watford	Total		1	0	0	0	0	0	0	0	1	0
Braintree Town (loan)	2013–14	Conference Premier	11	1	—		—		—		11	1
Oxford United (loan)	2014–15	League Two	9	1	0	0	1	0	0	0	10	1
Dagenham & Redbridge (loan)	2014–15	League Two	23	4	—		—		0	0	23	4
Fleetwood Town (loan)	2016–17	League One	3	0	0	0	0	0	2 (Note: Appearances in the EFL Trophy)	1	5	1
Wycombe Wanderers (loan)	2016–17	League Two	10	1	0	0	0	0	0	0	10	1
Falkirk (loan)	2017–18	Scottish Championship	15	5	3	2	0	0	0	0	18	7
Bristol Rovers (loan)	2018–19	League One	38	2	0	0	0	0	6	3	46	5
Gillingham (loan)	2019–20	League One	24	6	2	0	1	0	3	1	30	7
St Mirren (loan)	2019–20	Scottish Premiership	7	0	3	1	0	0	0	0	10	1
Dundee	2020–21	Scottish Championship	4	0	0	0	1	0	0	0	5	0
Dundee	2021–22	Scottish Premiership	7	0	0	0	3	1	0	0	10	1
Dundee	2022–23	Scottish Championship	20	6	2	0	5	4	3 (Note: Appearances in the Scottish Challenge Cup)	0	30	10
Dundee	Total		31	6	2	0	9	5	3	0	45	11
Partick Thistle (loan)	2021–22	Scottish Championship	11	1	1	0	—		2 (Note: Appearances in the Premiership play-offs)	0	14	1
Dunfermline Athletic	2023–24	Scottish Championship	27	2	1	0	—		0	0	28	2
Partick Thistle	2024–25	Scottish Championship	5	1	—		—		3 (Note: Appearance(s) in the Scottish Premiership play-offs)	0	8	1
Career total			215	30	12	3	11	5	19	5	257	43

== Honours ==
Dundee

- Scottish Premiership play-offs: 2020–21
- Scottish Championship: 2022–23
