= 2022–23 Dundee F.C. season =

Dundee
2022–23 season
- Chairman: Tim Keyes
- Manager: Gary Bowyer
- Stadium: Dens Park
- Scottish Championship: 1st (champions, promoted)
- League Cup: Quarter-finals
- Scottish Cup: Fourth round
- Challenge Cup: Semi-finals
- Top goalscorer: League: Zach Robinson (12); All: Lyall Cameron (14)
- Highest home attendance: 6,862 vs. Cove Rangers, 28 April 2023 (Championship)
- Lowest home attendance: 1,760 vs. Hamilton Academical, 9 July 2022 (League Cup GS)
- Average home league attendance: 4,865
| Home colours | Away colours | Third colours |

The 2022–23 season was Dundee's first season back in the second tier of Scottish football after being relegated from the previous season's Premiership. Dundee also competed in the Scottish League Cup, the Scottish Cup and the Scottish Challenge Cup.

On 5 May 2023, Dundee would win the Scottish Championship at the first time of asking in the last game of the league season and would gain promotion back to the Scottish Premiership.

== Season summary ==
=== Pre-season ===
Following Dundee's relegation the season prior, the club initiated a number of fundamental changes to the structure of the football department. After previously working mostly with the Youth Academy, Dundee's Technical Director Gordon Strachan would take a more active role with the first team going into the season. On 8 June 2022, Gary Bowyer was named as the new Dundee manager, with Billy Barr named as assistant manager. The club would also look to hire a Head of Recruitment to complete their structure, and would move the day-to-day operations of the club from Dens Park to Dundee and Angus College's Gardyne Campus.

=== July ===
Dundee would start their competitive season off with a comfortable 3–0 win over fellow Championship side Hamilton Academical in the League Cup group stages. They would repeat this scoreline the following week down south against Stranraer. This would mark the first time since 2009 in which Dundee had won back-to-back games by a scoreline of 3 or more goals to nil. Dundee continued their positive start away to Championship rivals Queen's Park with a 1–2 win. They would cap off an impressive group stage campaign with a dominant 5–1 win over Forfar Athletic. Despite their strong start to the season, Dundee would struggle badly in the league opener against Partick Thistle, scoring 2 late goals but still losing 2–3.

=== August ===
After a disappointing start to the league campaign, the Dee would recover with an away clean sheet win over Raith Rovers. They would continue their momentum with a gritty and impressive win over Arbroath to go top of the table, on an emotional night which commemorated the recently passed Dundee legend Pat Liney. Dundee could not keep up the same momentum the following week at Cappielow however, having to settle for a goalless draw against Morton. Any sense of positive momentum would end with a hapless defeat to league leaders Ayr United at Somerset Park. Dundee would bounce back with a comfortable win over Scottish League One side Falkirk to reach the quarter-finals of the Scottish League Cup for the second consecutive year.

=== September ===
Dundee would notch their second consecutive 3–0 win, dispatching Queen's Park at home with ease with a brace from Zach Robinson. Dundee's game against Cove Rangers was postponed after the death of Queen Elizabeth II. Despite controlling much of the game at home to Inverness CT, Dundee gave away slack goals and once again lost at home in frustrating fashion. The following week, Dundee would play their first competitive fixture outside of Scotland since the 2003–04 season in the UEFA Cup when they journeyed south to face Welsh champions The New Saints in the Scottish Challenge Cup, and would win comfortably in a match that would also mark Paul McGowan's 300th appearance for the Dark Blues.

=== October ===
In a visit to New Douglas Park, Dundee would emerge victorious in a testy affair with Hamilton Academical that should have been more comfortable. Being their usual inconsistent selves however, Dundee thoroughly disappointed in an embarrassing defeat away to part-time Cove Rangers just a few days later. They would again fail to defeat part-time opposition in the following match away to Arbroath, having to settle for a point instead. They would finally get back on track the next week with a home victory over high-flying Ayr United, moving up to 4th in the process. A daunting trip to Ibrox Stadium followed, and despite a battling performance they would be knocked out of the Scottish League Cup by Rangers by a tight 1–0 scoreline. A few days later, ten-man Dundee would have to settle for a scoreless point at home to Greenock Morton in a wet and dreary affair. To cap off a busy month, Dundee scraped a lucky point away to Queen's Park after going behind twice.

=== November ===
The month started off improbably for Dundee they came back from a two-goal deficit against Partick Thistle to win in dramatic fashion at Firhill Stadium. They would continue this positive momentum the following week, with Zach Robinson running the show and scoring both goals in a big home win over in-form Raith Rovers. Dundee would make it 7 league games unbeaten and 3 wins in a row next as they defeated bottom side Hamilton Academical 1–0 at Dens. The Dees were given a scare in the Scottish Cup the following week by Scottish League One side Airdrieonians, but 7 substitutes and an Airdrie red card helped Dundee dominate extra time, scoring four goals to end up with a convincing-looking 6–2 win. After a successful month in which the club won all their games, manager Gary Bowyer was named the Scottish Championship Manager of the Month, and Paul McMullan as the Championship's Player of the Month.

=== December ===
The winning and unbeaten streak continued with a landmark victory, as Dundee defeated Inverness Caledonian Thistle in the Highlands in a league game for the first time in their history via a goal from in-form Paul McMullan, marking the club's first 4-game win streak in the league since October 2013. Dundee would keep the momentum up the following Thursday with a comfortable win away to Falkirk to reach the quarter-finals of the Challenge Cup, making it 6 straight wins in all competitions. Unfortunately however, their next game against Cove Rangers would be postponed after ice and snow caused stadium and pitch damage to Dens Park. Dundee would end the year with yet more cheer, topping the league for Christmas after a double by Luke McCowan against his former club Ayr United clinched a win to pip the Honest Men to top spot despite an early straight red for Josh Mulligan, marking Dundee's seventh consecutive win in all competitions, their first such run since February 1974, as well as their fourth consecutive league clean sheet, and fifth in their last 6 games in all competitions.

=== January ===
Dundee's momentum came to a screeching halt in the new year, and despite coming back from 2 goals and a man down they would suffer defeat against part-time Arbroath, knocking them off top spot. It took a late equaliser from Jordan McGhee to snatch a point at Stark's Park four days later. Dundee would have a home stretch planned, but issues with a now waterlogged Dens Park resulted in three call-offs during the month. After a two-week period without a game, Dundee would match Scottish Premiership club St Mirren evenly in the Scottish Cup before being knocked out on penalties. They would finally play a home game the following Tuesday in the Scottish Challenge Cup quarter-finals, defeating League One leaders Dunfermline Athletic (managed by former Dundee boss James McPake) to progress to the semi-finals in a high-scoring affair. Despite being dogged by injuries and disjointed by squad changes, Dundee comfortably beat league leaders Queen's Park to end the month on a high note.

=== February ===
Dundee opened up the month in frustrating fashion, failing to capitalise on chances and having to settle for a point against bottom side (albeit in good form) Hamilton Accies. They then somehow snatched defeat from the jaws of victory in the Challenge Cup semi-final against Raith Rovers, going out on penalties after leading by multiple goals late on. The club would return to winning ways in their following match, a comfortable 3–0 victory over Cove Rangers. However, they would once again falter against bogey team Greenock Morton, losing 1–0 at Cappielow. The inconsistent form would continue the following week at home to Inverness CT, where a fluke goal conceded and doing everything but scoring the winning goal (despite having a good goal chopped off due to incompetent refereeing) led to a very disappointing draw and Dundee falling further behind in the title race. Their bottle completely crashed in their game in hand at home to Partick Thistle, being handily beaten in a dismal performance.

=== March ===
Dundee started March with a much-needed win away to Cove Rangers to close the gap at the top to two points ahead of a two-week hiatus. Dundee started their final round of fixtures flatly with a drab goalless affair away to Partick Thistle, which left them seven points behind the league leaders. In their game in hand four days later though, Dundee stepped up in a big win over promotion rivals Ayr United to close the gap back to four points whilst opening an equal-sized gap on the 3rd placed Honest Men. At the end of the month, manager Gary Bowyer was named Scottish Championship Manager of the Month.

=== April ===
The Dee started the month off with a bang, battering bottom side and new Challenge Cup champions Hamilton Academical 7–0, including a hat-trick from midfielder Lyall Cameron. This proved to be their largest margin of victory since a League Cup group stage win over Forfar Athletic on 30 July 2016, and the largest margin of victory in a league match since an 0–8 away win over Falkirk on 22 January 1977. In front of a packed Gayfield Park the following week, Dundee could only manage a point in a goalless draw with Arbroath which nevertheless put them top of the league on goal difference with a game in hand. They followed up with a massive win over Raith Rovers at Dens in said game in hand to stretch their lead at the top to three points with 4 games to go. In another tough encounter with their bogey team Greenock Morton, Dundee grabbed a last-gasp equaliser at Dens to snatch a point. They would keep their unbeaten streak going in Inverness, but left frustrated after losing a lead that would have helped their title charge massively after playing well and had to settle with a draw up in the Highlands to maintain their slender lead at the top with two games to go. They would blow an even bigger opportunity to take control of the league by failing to beat bottom side Cove Rangers, leaving the title to a final game showdown at Ochilview Park against Queen's Park where a draw or win would see them crowned as champions.

=== May ===
Prior to the title-deciding game, Dundee winger Paul McMullan was nominated for the PFA Scotland Championship Player of the Year after scoring 7 goals and providing 11 assists in the league this season. In an epic and chaotic encounter at Ochilview Park on 5 May, Dundee weathered the storm against Queen's Park and won the league with a frenetic and unforgettable 3–5 victory which secured promotion back to the Scottish Premiership on the first attempt. This would mark the first time since February 2017 that Dundee would score 5 away goals in a competitive fixture, and the last of those goals marked Dundee's 100th goal in competitive fixtures during the 2022–23 season.

Manager Gary Bowyer was announced as the SPFL Scottish Championship Manager of the Year on 10 May 2023. Later that day, Dundee announced that they would part ways with Bowyer and assistant manager Billy Barr. Bowyer would leave Dundee as the permanent manager with the highest overall win percentage in the club's history.

== Competitions ==
Win Draw Loss Postponed

All times are in British Summer Time (BST).

=== Pre-season and friendlies ===
| 2 July 2022 Friendly | Peterhead | 0–4 | Dundee | Balmoor Stadium, Peterhead |
| 14:00 | | Report | Rudden 36'; McGinn 46'; McCowan 71'; Mulligan 74' | Referee: Duncan Nicholson |

| 5 July 2022 Friendly | Montrose | 1–1 | Dundee | Links Park, Montrose |
| 19:45 | Johnston 63' | Report | Jakubiak 29' | Attendance: 808; Referee: Mike Roncone |

| 13 July 2022 Friendly | Dundee | 1–1 | Blackburn Rovers | Dens Park, Dundee |
| 19:45 | Jakubiak 36' | Report | Rowe (trialist) 33' (o.g.) | Attendance: 1,387 |

=== Scottish Championship ===
Dundee will play against Arbroath, Ayr United, Cove Rangers, Greenock Morton, Hamilton Academical, Inverness Caledonian Thistle, Partick Thistle, Queen's Park and Raith Rovers during the 2022–23 Championship campaign. They will play each team four times, twice at home and twice away.

| 30 July 2022 1 | Dundee | 2–3 | Partick Thistle | Dens Park, Dundee |
| 15:00 | Kerr 64'; French 85' | Report | Fitzpatrick 16'; Lawless 24'; McKinnon 50' | Attendance: 5,513; Referee: Alan Muir |

| 6 August 2022 2 | Raith Rovers | 0–1 | Dundee | Stark's Park, Kirkcaldy |
| 15:00 | | Report | Mulligan 13' | Attendance: 3,222; Referee: Chris Graham |

| 12 August 2022 3 | Dundee | 4–2 | Arbroath | Dens Park, Dundee |
| 19:45 | McCowan 40'; Rudden 64'; Robinson 88'; Mulligan 90+2' | Report | Low 51' (pen.); Hamilton 81' | Attendance: 5,114; Referee: Graham Grainger |

| 20 August 2022 4 | Greenock Morton | 0–0 | Dundee | Cappielow, Greenock |
| 15:00 | | Report | | Attendance: 2,091; Referee: Don Robertson |

| 26 August 2022 5 | Ayr United | 3–1 | Dundee | Somerset Park, Ayr |
| 19:45 | Akinyemi 17', 67'; Houston 62' | Report | Rudden 4'; Sweeney (red card) 90+2' | Attendance: 2,274; Referee: Greg Aitken |

| 3 September 2022 6 | Dundee | 3–0 | Queen's Park | Dens Park, Dundee |
| 15:00 | Robinson 27' (pen.), 44'; Rudden 70' | Report | | Attendance: 4,178; Referee: Grant Irvine |

| 17 September 2022 7 | Dundee | 2–3 | Inverness Caledonian Thistle | Dens Park, Dundee |
| 15:00 | Sweeney 12', (red card) 89'; Grayson 57' | Report | Harper 15', 83'; Mckay 45+2' (pen.) | Attendance: 4,396; Referee: Peter Stuart |

| 1 October 2022 8 | Hamilton Academical | 0–2 | Dundee | New Douglas Park, Hamilton |
| 15:00 | | Report | Cameron 29'; McCowan 90+5' | Attendance: 1,642; Referee: Matthew MacDermid |

| 4 October 2022 9* | Cove Rangers | 3–1 | Dundee | Balmoral Stadium, Aberdeen |
| 19:45 | Megginson 27'; Scully 50', 54' | Report | Anderson 10' | Attendance: 1,322; Referee: Nick Walsh |
Note: Initially postponed and rescheduled due to the death of Queen Elizabeth II. Original date was 8 September 2022.

| 8 October 2022 10 | Arbroath | 1–1 | Dundee | Gayfield Park, Arbroath |
| 15:00 | Linn 37' | Report | Rudden 6' | Attendance: 3,372; Referee: Colin Steven |

| 15 October 2022 11 | Dundee | 2–1 | Ayr United | Dens Park, Dundee |
| 15:00 | McMullan 38'; Robinson 49' | Report | Mullin 61' | Attendance: 4,490; Referee: Grant Irvine |

| 22 October 2022 12 | Dundee | 0–0 | Greenock Morton | Dens Park, Dundee |
| 15:00 | Mulligan (red card) 79' | Report | | Attendance: 4,214; Referee: Lloyd Wilson |

| 28 October 2022 13 | Queen's Park | 2–2 | Dundee | Ochilview Park, Stenhousemuir |
| 19:45 | Jarrett 30'; Robson 53'; Thomas (red card) 89' | Report | McMullan 52'; Osei 87' | Attendance: 1,006; Referee: Barry Cook |

| 5 November 2022 14 | Partick Thistle | 2–3 | Dundee | Firhill Stadium, Glasgow |
| 15:00 | Milne 21', 36'; Muirhead (red card) 69' | Report | Robinson 58'; Sweeney 68'; Kerr 76' | Attendance: 3,046; Referee: Craig Napier |

| 12 November 2022 15 | Dundee | 2–0 | Raith Rovers | Dens Park, Dundee |
| 15:00 | Robinson 49' (pen.), 54' | Report | | Attendance: 5,022; Referee: Grant Irvine |

| 19 November 2022 16 | Dundee | 1–0 | Hamilton Academical | Dens Park, Dundee |
| 15:00 | McMullan 57' | Report | | Attendance: 4,293; Referee: Graham Grainger |

| 3 December 2022 17 | Inverness Caledonian Thistle | 0–1 | Dundee | Caledonian Stadium, Inverness |
| 15:00 | | Report | McMullan 26' | Attendance: 2,435; Referee: Alan Muir |

| 23 December 2022 18 | Ayr United | 0–2 | Dundee | Somerset Park, Ayr |
| 19:45 | Bangala (red card) 63' | Report | Mulligan (red card) 19'; McCowan 68', 84' | Attendance: 2,704; Referee: Steven McLean |

| 2 January 2023 19 | Dundee | 2–4 | Arbroath | Dens Park, Dundee |
| 15:00 | Williamson (red card) 30'; McMullan 41'; Rudden 56' (pen.) | Report | McKenna 9'; Hamilton 13'; O'Brien 58'; Hilson 77' | Attendance: 5,930; Referee: Scott Lambie |

| 6 January 2023 20 | Raith Rovers | 1–1 | Dundee | Stark's Park, Kirkcaldy |
| 19:45 | Connolly 38' | Report | McGhee 78' | Attendance: 3,050; Referee: Craig Napier |

| 28 January 2023 21 | Dundee | 3–0 | Queen's Park | Dens Park, Dundee |
| 15:00 | Williamson 69'; Jakubiak 74'; Sweeney 83' | Report | | Attendance: 5,004; Referee: Euan Anderson |

| 4 February 2023 22 | Hamilton Academical | 1–1 | Dundee | New Douglas Park, Hamilton |
| 15:00 | C. Smith 5' | Report | McGhee 38' | Attendance: 1,649; Referee: Don Robertson |

| 12 February 2023 23* | Dundee | 3–0 | Cove Rangers | Dens Park, Dundee |
| 14:00 | Robinson 49'; Jakubiak 51'; Cameron 78' | Report | | Attendance: 4,208; Referee: Craig Napier |
Note: Initially postponed and rescheduled due to stadium damage caused by severe weather. Original date was 17 December 2022.

| 17 February 2023 24 | Greenock Morton | 1–0 | Dundee | Cappielow, Greenock |
| 19:45 | Baird 6' | Report | | Attendance: 2,188; Referee: Euan Anderson |

| 25 February 2023 25 | Dundee | 1–1 | Inverness Caledonian Thistle | Dens Park, Dundee |
| 15:00 | Robinson 13' (pen.) | Report | Harper 56' | Attendance: 4,447; Referee: Chris Graham |

| 28 February 2023 26* | Dundee | 1–3 | Partick Thistle | Dens Park, Dundee |
| 19:45 | McGhee 80' | Report | Graham 42', 75'; Milne 81' | Attendance: 4,622; Referee: Don Robertson |
Note: Initially postponed and rescheduled due to a waterlogged pitch. Original date was 14 January 2023.

| 4 March 2023 27 | Cove Rangers | 0–2 | Dundee | Balmoral Stadium, Aberdeen |
| 15:00 | | Report | Cameron 45+1'; Ashcroft 59' | Attendance: 1,561; Referee: Calum Scott |

| 18 March 2023 28 | Partick Thistle | 0–0 | Dundee | Firhill Stadium, Glasgow |
| 15:00 | | Report | | Attendance: 3,656; Referee: Alan Newlands |

| 21 March 2023 29* | Dundee | 3–1 | Ayr United | Dens Park, Dundee |
| 19:45 | Sweeney 13'; Jakubiak 59'; McCowan 80' | Report | Akinyemi 17' | Attendance: 4,007; Referee: Steven Kirkland |
Note: Initially postponed and rescheduled due to conflict with Ayr United's Scottish Cup tie. Original date was 11 March 2023.

| 1 April 2023 30 | Dundee | 7–0 | Hamilton Academical | Dens Park, Dundee |
| 15:00 | Jakubiak 7'; Sweeney 16'; Cameron 45', 72', 76'; McCowan 45+4'; Thomas 84' | Report | | Attendance: 5,019; Referee: Kevin Clancy |

| 8 April 2023 31 | Arbroath | 0–0 | Dundee | Gayfield Park, Arbroath |
| 15:00 | | Report | | Attendance: 5,563; Referee: Scott Lambie |

| 11 April 2023 32* | Dundee | 3–1 | Raith Rovers | Dens Park, Dundee |
| 19:45 | Robinson 29', 53'; Jakubiak 75' | Report | Akio 77' | Attendance: 5,009; Referee: Greg Aitken |
Note: Initially postponed and rescheduled due to conflict with Raith's Scottish Challenge Cup tie. Original date was 25 March 2023.

| 15 April 2023 33 | Dundee | 3–3 | Greenock Morton | Dens Park, Dundee |
| 15:00 | Hannant 32'; Thomas 71', 90+4' | Report | O'Connor 17'; Muirhead 60'; Baird 64' | Attendance: 5,246; Referee: Chris Graham |

| 22 April 2023 34 | Inverness Caledonian Thistle | 1–1 | Dundee | Caledonian Stadium, Inverness |
| 15:00 | Samuels 75' | Report | Cameron 60' | Attendance: 3,882; Referee: Euan Anderson |

| 28 April 2023 35 | Dundee | 0–0 | Cove Rangers | Dens Park, Dundee |
| 19:45 | | Report | | Attendance: 6,862; Referee: Greg Aitken |

| 5 May 2023 36 | Queen's Park | 3–5 | Dundee | Ochilview Park, Stenhousemuir |
| 19:45 | Fox 10', 45+1'; Shields 12' | Report | Jakubiak 4'; Ashcroft 16'; Robinson 33'; Cameron 54'; McCowan 81' | Attendance: 2,045; Referee: David Munro |

==== League table ====
| Pos | Team | Pld | W | D | L | GF | GA | GD | Pts | Promotion, qualification or relegation |
|---|---|---|---|---|---|---|---|---|---|---|
| 1 | Dundee (C, P) | 36 | 17 | 12 | 7 | 66 | 40 | +26 | 63 | Promotion to the Premiership |
| 2 | Ayr United | 36 | 16 | 10 | 10 | 61 | 43 | +18 | 58 | Qualification for the Premiership play-off semi-final |
| 3 | Queen's Park | 36 | 17 | 7 | 12 | 63 | 52 | +11 | 58 | Qualification for the Premiership play-off quarter-final |
| 4 | Partick Thistle | 36 | 16 | 9 | 11 | 65 | 45 | +20 | 57 | Qualification for the Premiership play-off quarter-final |
| 5 | Greenock Morton | 36 | 15 | 12 | 9 | 53 | 43 | +10 | 57 | |

Rules for classification: 1) Points; 2) Goal difference; 3) Goals scored; 4) Head-to-to head points; 5) Head-to-head goal difference; 6) Play-off (only for deciding promotion, play-off participation and relegation).
(C) Champions; (P) Promoted

==== Results by round ====
| Round | 1 | 2 | 3 | 4 | 5 | 6 | 7 | 8 | 9 | 10 | 11 | 12 | 13 | 14 | 15 | 16 | 17 | 18 | 19 | 20 | 21 | 22 | 23 | 24 | 25 | 26 | 27 | 28 | 29 | 30 | 31 | 32 | 33 | 34 | 35 | 36 |
|---|---|---|---|---|---|---|---|---|---|---|---|---|---|---|---|---|---|---|---|---|---|---|---|---|---|---|---|---|---|---|---|---|---|---|---|---|
| Ground | H | A | H | A | A | H | H | A | A | A | H | H | A | A | H | H | A | A | H | A | H | A | H | A | H | H | A | A | H | H | A | H | H | A | H | A |
| Result | L | W | W | D | L | W | L | W | L | D | W | D | D | W | W | W | W | W | L | D | W | D | W | L | D | L | W | D | W | W | D | W | D | D | D | W |
| Position | 9 | 5 | 1 | 3 | 5 | 3 | 5 | 5 | 5 | 5 | 4 | 5 | 6 | 4 | 3 | 3 | 2 | 1 | 2 | 3 | 3 | 3 | 2 | 2 | 2 | 2 | 2 | 2 | 2 | 2 | 1 | 1 | 1 | 1 | 1 | 1 |

Source: See results
A = Away; H = Home; W = Win; D = Draw; L = Loss

=== Scottish Cup ===
Dundee entered the competition in the 3rd round. Their 3rd round win over Airdrieonians would see six goals scored by Dundee, their highest tally in a Scottish Cup game since a 7–0 win over Nairn County in the 1985–86 season.

| 26 November 2022 Third round | Dundee | 6–2 (a.e.t.) | Airdrieonians | Dens Park, Dundee |
| 15:00 | McMullan 45'; Rudden 54'; Osei 103', 108'; Robertson 112'; McCowan 117' | Report | Gallagher 21'; Smith 66'; Ballantyne (red card) 90+5' | Attendance: 2,341; Referee: Lloyd Wilson |

| 21 January 2023 Fourth round | St Mirren | 0–0 (a.e.t.) (3–0 p) | Dundee | St Mirren Park, Paisley |
| 15:00 | | Report | | Attendance: 4,254; Referee: Colin Steven |
| | Penalties |
| | Brophy (penalty missed); O'Hara (penalty scored); Greive (penalty scored); Kiltie (penalty scored) | | Rudden (penalty missed); Thomas (penalty missed); Cameron (penalty missed) |

=== Scottish League Cup ===
Dundee were a top seed in the group stage draw that took place on 25 May 2022 at 13:00 on FreeSports and the SPFL's YouTube channel. Dundee were drawn into Group H along with Hamilton Academical, Queen's Park, Forfar Athletic and Stranraer.

==== Group stage ====
| 9 July 2022 1 | Dundee | 3–0 | Hamilton Academical | Dens Park, Dundee |
| 15:00 | McGinn 25'; Jakubiak 48' (pen.); Cameron 90+1' | Report | Easton (red card) 80' | Attendance: 1,760; Referee: Gavin Duncan |

| 16 July 2022 2 | Stranraer | 0–3 | Dundee | Stair Park, Stranraer |
| 15:00 | | Report | Kerr 43'; McGowan 73'; McCowan 83' | Attendance: 497; Referee: Greg Aitken |

| 19 July 2022 3 | Queen's Park | 1–2 | Dundee | Ochilview Park, Stenhousemuir |
| 19:45 | Longridge 52' | Report | Jakubiak 31'; Kerr 36' | Attendance: 570; Referee: Willie Collum |

| 23 July 2022 4 | Dundee | 5–1 | Forfar Athletic | Dens Park, Dundee |
| 15:00 | Jakubiak 21', 24'; McGinn 38'; French 45'; Cameron 66' | Report | McCluskey 68' | Attendance: 1,854; Referee: Graham Grainger |

==== Knockout stage ====
Dundee were seeded in the second round as one of the three best group winners. The draw took place following the final group stage game on 24 July.

| 30 August 2022 Second round | Dundee | 3–0 | Falkirk | Dens Park, Dundee |
| 19:45 | Cameron 55'; Ashcroft 80'; Robinson 90' (pen.) | Report | Oliver (red card) 89' | Attendance: 3,195; Referee: Colin Steven |

| 19 October 2022 Quarter-finals | Rangers | 1–0 | Dundee | Ibrox Stadium, Glasgow |
| 20:15 | Davis 10' | Report | | Attendance: 37,107; Referee: Willie Collum |

==== Group H table ====
| Pos | Team | Pld | W | PW | PL | L | GF | GA | GD | Pts | Qualification | DND | HAM | QPA | FOR | STR |
|---|---|---|---|---|---|---|---|---|---|---|---|---|---|---|---|---|
| 1 | Dundee | 4 | 4 | 0 | 0 | 0 | 13 | 2 | +11 | 12 | Qualification for the second round | — | 3–0 | — | 5–1 | — |
| 2 | Hamilton Academical | 4 | 2 | 1 | 0 | 1 | 9 | 6 | +3 | 8 | | — | — | p1–1 | — | 5–2 |
| 3 | Queen's Park | 4 | 2 | 0 | 1 | 1 | 11 | 6 | +5 | 7 | | 1–2 | — | — | 4–1 | — |
| 4 | Forfar Athletic | 4 | 1 | 0 | 0 | 3 | 5 | 12 | −7 | 3 | | — | 0–3 | — | — | 3–0 (Note: Forfar Athletic were awarded a technical 3−0 win over Stranraer, who fielded an ineligible player. The match had originally finished 2–2, with Forfar Athletic securing the bonus point following a 5–3 win on penalties.) |
| 5 | Stranraer | 4 | 0 | 0 | 0 | 4 | 4 | 16 | −12 | 0 | | 0–3 | — | 2–5 | — | — |

Rules for classification: 1) goal difference, 2) goals scored, 3) away goals scored, 4) matches won, 5) away matches won, 6) drawing of lots.

=== Scottish Challenge Cup ===
Dundee will compete in the Scottish Challenge Cup, and will enter the competition in the 3rd round on the weekend of 23–25 September 2022. The draw took place on 29 August 2022 at 13:00 on SPFL's YouTube channel.

| 23 September 2022 Third round | The New Saints (Wales) | 0–3 | (Scotland) Dundee | Park Hall, Oswestry, England |
| 20:00 | | Report | Sheridan 48'; Cameron 51'; Anderson 90+1' | Attendance: 508; Referee: Tom Owen (FAW) |

| 8 December 2022 Fourth round | Falkirk | 0–3 | Dundee | Falkirk Stadium, Falkirk |
| 19:45 | | Report | Rudden 5' (pen.), 14'; Robertson 77' | Attendance: 1,700; Referee: Calum Scott |

| 24 January 2023 Quarter-finals* | Dundee | 4–2 | Dunfermline Athletic | Dens Park, Dundee |
| 19:45 | McMullan 29'; Robertson 59'; McCowan 83'; Anderson 90+1' | Report | McCann 38'; Wighton 90+3' | Attendance: 2,089; Referee: Craig Napier |
Note: Initially postponed and rescheduled twice due to a waterlogged and frozen pitch respectively. Original date was 10 January 2023.

| 8 February 2023 Semi-finals | Dundee | 2–2 (a.e.t.) (3–4 p) | Raith Rovers | Dens Park, Dundee |
| 19:45 | Cameron 5', 28' | Report | Akio 77'; Stanton 82' | Attendance: 2,948; Referee: Colin Steven |
| | Penalties |
| | McGhee (penalty scored); Williamson (penalty scored); Tolaj (penalty scored); Anderson (penalty missed); Robinson (penalty missed) | | Spencer (penalty scored); Akio (penalty scored); Connolly (penalty missed); Millen (penalty scored); Easton (penalty scored) |

== Squad statistics ==
As of end of season

| No. | Pos | Nat | Player | Total | | Championship | | Scottish Cup | | League Cup | | Challenge Cup | |
| No. | Pos | Nat | Player | Apps | Goals | Apps | Goals | Apps | Goals | Apps | Goals | Apps | Goals |
|---|---|---|---|---|---|---|---|---|---|---|---|---|---|
| 1 | GK | (England) ENG | Adam Legzdins | 29 | 0 | 24 | 0 | 1+1 | 0 | 1 | 0 | 2 | 0 |
| 2 | DF | (Scotland) SCO | Cammy Kerr | 38 | 4 | 25+1 | 2 | 2 | 0 | 6 | 2 | 3+1 | 0 |
| 3 | DF | (England) ENG | Jordan Marshall | 34 | 0 | 23+3 | 0 | 1 | 0 | 5 | 0 | 2 | 0 |
| 4 | DF | (England) ENG | Tyler French | 25 | 2 | 17+1 | 1 | 1 | 0 | 5 | 1 | 1 | 0 |
| 5 | DF | (Republic of Ireland) IRL | Ryan Sweeney | 44 | 5 | 32 | 5 | 2 | 0 | 6 | 0 | 3+1 | 0 |
| 6 | MF | (Scotland) SCO | Jordan McGhee | 36 | 3 | 27+2 | 3 | 2 | 0 | 1+1 | 0 | 2+1 | 0 |
| 7 | FW | (Scotland) SCO | Alex Jakubiak | 30 | 10 | 11+9 | 6 | 1+1 | 0 | 3+2 | 4 | 2+1 | 0 |
| 8 | MF | (Scotland) SCO | Shaun Byrne | 16 | 0 | 5+6 | 0 | 1 | 0 | 4 | 0 | 0 | 0 |
| 9 | FW | (Saint Kitts and Nevis) SKN | Kwame Thomas | 15 | 3 | 4+8 | 3 | 0+1 | 0 | 0 | 0 | 2 | 0 |
| 11 | MF | (England) ENG | Luke Hannant | 14 | 1 | 11+3 | 1 | 0 | 0 | 0 | 0 | 0 | 0 |
| 14 | DF | (Scotland) SCO | Lee Ashcroft | 42 | 3 | 30+4 | 2 | 2 | 0 | 1+1 | 1 | 4 | 0 |
| 15 | MF | (Scotland) SCO | Josh Mulligan | 42 | 2 | 24+7 | 2 | 2 | 0 | 5+1 | 0 | 1+2 | 0 |
| 16 | FW | (England) ENG | Zach Robinson | 33 | 13 | 19+10 | 12 | 0 | 0 | 2 | 1 | 0+2 | 0 |
| 17 | MF | (Scotland) SCO | Luke McCowan | 40 | 10 | 20+10 | 7 | 1+1 | 1 | 1+4 | 1 | 2+1 | 1 |
| 18 | MF | (Scotland) SCO | Paul McMullan | 46 | 7 | 26+9 | 5 | 2 | 1 | 3+2 | 0 | 4 | 1 |
| 19 | MF | (Scotland) SCO | Finlay Robertson | 15 | 3 | 1+7 | 0 | 0+2 | 1 | 1+1 | 0 | 2+1 | 2 |
| 21 | GK | (Republic of Ireland) IRL | Ian Lawlor | 6 | 0 | 5 | 0 | 1 | 0 | 0 | 0 | 0 | 0 |
| 22 | MF | (Scotland) SCO | Ben Williamson | 31 | 1 | 12+12 | 1 | 1 | 0 | 1+3 | 0 | 1+1 | 0 |
| 23 | FW | (Republic of Ireland) IRL | Cillian Sheridan | 15 | 1 | 3+7 | 0 | 0+1 | 0 | 0 | 0 | 1+3 | 1 |
| 24 | MF | (Scotland) SCO | Max Anderson | 27 | 3 | 5+11 | 1 | 1+1 | 0 | 3+2 | 0 | 2+2 | 2 |
| 25 | MF | (Scotland) SCO | Lyall Cameron | 39 | 14 | 19+8 | 8 | 0+2 | 0 | 2+4 | 3 | 4 | 3 |
| 28 | DF | (Scotland) SCO | Sam Fisher | 8 | 0 | 5+1 | 0 | 0 | 0 | 1+1 | 0 | 0 | 0 |
| 30 | GK | (Scotland) SCO | Harrison Sharp | 14 | 0 | 7 | 0 | 0 | 0 | 5 | 0 | 2 | 0 |
| 31 | DF | (England) ENG | Ryan Clampin | 7 | 0 | 2+5 | 0 | 0 | 0 | 0 | 0 | 0 | 0 |
| 34 | MF | (Scotland) SCO | Barry Maguire | 12 | 0 | 10+1 | 0 | 0 | 0 | 0 | 0 | 1 | 0 |
| 37 | FW | (Switzerland) SUI | Lorent Tolaj | 3 | 0 | 0+2 | 0 | 0 | 0 | 0 | 0 | 0+1 | 0 |
| 42 | MF | (United States) USA | Pierre Reedy | 4 | 0 | 0+4 | 0 | 0 | 0 | 0 | 0 | 0 | 0 |
| 51 | GK | (Scotland) SCO | Ruaridh Lynch | 0 | 0 | 0 | 0 | 0 | 0 | 0 | 0 | 0 | 0 |
Players away from the club on loan:
| 10 | MF | (Scotland) SCO | Paul McGowan | 14 | 1 | 5+3 | 0 | 0 | 0 | 3+2 | 1 | 1 | 0 |
| 20 | FW | (Scotland) SCO | Zak Rudden | 27 | 8 | 11+8 | 5 | 1+1 | 1 | 1+2 | 0 | 1+2 | 2 |
| 27 | DF | (England) ENG | Luke Strachan | 1 | 0 | 0 | 0 | 0 | 0 | 0 | 0 | 0+1 | 0 |
| 40 | MF | (Scotland) SCO | Cammy Blacklock | 0 | 0 | 0 | 0 | 0 | 0 | 0 | 0 | 0 | 0 |
| 41 | GK | (Scotland) SCO | Thomas Welsh | 0 | 0 | 0 | 0 | 0 | 0 | 0 | 0 | 0 | 0 |
| 44 | DF | (Scotland) SCO | Jack Wilkie | 1 | 0 | 0 | 0 | 0 | 0 | 0+1 | 0 | 0 | 0 |
| 45 | DF | (Scotland) SCO | Luke Graham | 0 | 0 | 0 | 0 | 0 | 0 | 0 | 0 | 0 | 0 |
| 48 | MF | (Scotland) SCO | Callum Lamb | 0 | 0 | 0 | 0 | 0 | 0 | 0 | 0 | 0 | 0 |
Players who left the club during the season:
| 11 | MF | (Northern Ireland) NIR | Niall McGinn | 9 | 2 | 1+3 | 0 | 0 | 0 | 4+1 | 2 | 0 | 0 |
| 12 | MF | (Canada) CAN | Jay Chapman | 0 | 0 | 0 | 0 | 0 | 0 | 0 | 0 | 0 | 0 |
| 31 | FW | (France) FRA | Derick Osei | 9 | 3 | 1+5 | 1 | 0+1 | 2 | 0+1 | 0 | 0+1 | 0 |
| 38 | MF | (England) ENG | Joe Grayson | 17 | 1 | 11+2 | 1 | 0+1 | 0 | 2 | 0 | 1 | 0 |

== Transfers ==
=== Summer ===
==== Players in ====
| Date | Player | From | Fee |
|---|---|---|---|
| 1 July 2022 | (Scotland) Zak Rudden | (Scotland) Partick Thistle | Free |
| 5 July 2022 | (England) Tyler French | (Wales) Wrexham | Undisclosed |
| 15 July 2022 | (Scotland) Ben Williamson | (Scotland) Rangers | Loan |
| 30 July 2022 | (England) Zach Robinson | (England) AFC Wimbledon | Loan |
| 9 August 2022 | (England) Joe Grayson | (England) Barrow | Loan |

==== Players out ====
| Date | Player | To | Fee |
|---|---|---|---|
| 5 August 2022 | (Scotland) Tom Findlay | (Scotland) Elgin City | Loan |
| 13 August 2022 | (Scotland) Jack Wilkie | (Scotland) Peterhead | Loan |
| 13 August 2022 | (Scotland) Ewan Murray | (Scotland) Peterhead | Loan |
| 16 August 2022 | (Scotland) Sam Fisher | (Scotland) Dunfermline Athletic | Loan |

=== Winter ===
==== Players in ====
| Date | Player | From | Fee |
|---|---|---|---|
| 6 October 2022 | (France) Derick Osei | (England) AFC Wimbledon | Free |
| 19 January 2023 | (Saint Kitts and Nevis) Kwame Thomas | (England) Sutton United | Loan |
| 20 January 2023 | (Scotland) Sam Fisher | (Scotland) Dunfermline Athletic | End of loan |
| 26 January 2023 | (Scotland) Barry Maguire | (Scotland) Motherwell | Loan |
| 27 January 2023 | (England) Ryan Clampin | (England) Colchester United | Loan |
| 31 January 2023 | (England) Luke Hannant | (England) Colchester United | Loan |
| 31 January 2023 | (Switzerland) Lorent Tolaj | (England) Brighton & Hove Albion | Loan |
| 31 January 2023 | (England) Zach Robinson | (England) AFC Wimbledon | Loan |
| 8 April 2023 | (United States) Pierre Reedy | (United States) Real Monarchs | Free |

==== Players out ====
| Date | Player | To | Fee |
|---|---|---|---|
| 30 September 2022 | (Scotland) Luke Graham | (Scotland) Albion Rovers | Loan |
| 3 October 2022 | (Canada) Jay Chapman | (United States) Colorado Springs Switchbacks | Mutual consent |
| 6 January 2023 | (England) Zach Robinson | (England) AFC Wimbledon | End of loan |
| 6 January 2023 | (England) Luke Strachan | (Scotland) Alloa Athletic | End of loan |
| 9 January 2023 | (Northern Ireland) Niall McGinn | (Northern Ireland) Glentoran | Mutual consent |
| 16 January 2023 | (France) Derick Osei | Free agent | Mutual consent |
| 18 January 2023 | (England) Joe Grayson | (England) Barrow | End of loan |
| 31 January 2023 | (Scotland) Zak Rudden | (Scotland) St Johnstone | Loan |
| 18 February 2023 | (England) Euan Mutale | (Scotland) Albion Rovers | Loan |
| 21 February 2023 | (Scotland) Paul McGowan | (Scotland) Dunfermline Athletic | Loan |

=== End of season ===
==== New deals and extensions ====
| Date | Player | Until |
|---|---|---|
| 12 May 2023 | (Scotland) Lyall Cameron | May 2025 |
| 30 May 2023 | (Scotland) Cammy Kerr | May 2025 |
| 31 May 2023 | (England) Adam Legzdins | May 2025 |
| 2 June 2023 | (Scotland) Lee Ashcroft | May 2025 |
| 2 June 2023 | (Scotland) Harrison Sharp | May 2025 |
| 3 June 2023 | (Scotland) Josh Mulligan | May 2025 |
| 4 June 2023 | (Scotland) Luke McCowan | May 2025 |
| 10 June 2023 | (Scotland) Jordan McGhee | May 2025 |
| 12 June 2023 | (Scotland) Finlay Robertson | May 2025 |
| 13 June 2023 | (Scotland) Max Anderson | May 2025 |

==== Players out ====
| Date | Player | To | Fee |
|---|---|---|---|
| 22 May 2023 | (Republic of Ireland) Ian Lawlor | (England) Doncaster Rovers | End of contract |
| 31 May 2023 | (Scotland) Ben Williamson | (Scotland) Rangers | Loan ended |
| 31 May 2023 | (England) Zach Robinson | (England) AFC Wimbledon | Loan ended |
| 31 May 2023 | (Saint Kitts and Nevis) Kwame Thomas | (England) Sutton United | Loan ended |
| 31 May 2023 | (Scotland) Barry Maguire | (Scotland) Motherwell | Loan ended |
| 31 May 2023 | (England) Ryan Clampin | (England) Colchester United | Loan ended |
| 31 May 2023 | (England) Luke Hannant | (England) Colchester United | Loan ended |
| 31 May 2023 | (Switzerland) Lorent Tolaj | (England) Brighton & Hove Albion | Loan ended |
| 31 May 2023 | (England) Jordan Marshall | (Wales) The New Saints | End of contract |
| 31 May 2023 | (Scotland) Alex Jakubiak | (Scotland) Dunfermline Athletic | End of contract |
| 31 May 2023 | (Scotland) Paul McMullan | (Republic of Ireland) Derry City | End of contract |
| 31 May 2023 | (Republic of Ireland) Cillian Sheridan | (Scotland) Inverness CT | End of contract |
| 31 May 2023 | (England) Luke Strachan | (Scotland) Cove Rangers | End of contract |
| 1 June 2023 | (Scotland) Paul McGowan | (Scotland) Cove Rangers | End of contract |
| 5 June 2023 | (Republic of Ireland) Ryan Sweeney | (England) Burton Albion | End of contract |
| 20 June 2023 | (Scotland) Sam Fisher | (Scotland) Dunfermline Athletic | End of contract |
| 1 July 2023 | (United States) Pierre Reedy | (United States) Charleston Battery | End of contract |

== End of season awards ==
=== Club Player of the Year awards ===
- Andrew De Vries Player of the Year: Lyall Cameron
- Isobel Sneddon Young Player of the Year: Lyall Cameron
- Players' Player of the Year: Lyall Cameron

=== National awards ===
Scottish Professional Football League

- Scottish Championship Manager of the Year: Gary Bowyer
- Scottish Championship Team of the Year: Ryan Sweeney, Lee Ashcroft, Lyall Cameron

PFA Scotland

- Scottish Championship Player of the Year nominee: Paul McMullan
- Scottish Championship Team of the Year: Ryan Sweeney, Lee Ashcroft, Lyall Cameron

== See also ==
- List of Dundee F.C. seasons
