= Josh Mulligan =

Scottish footballer

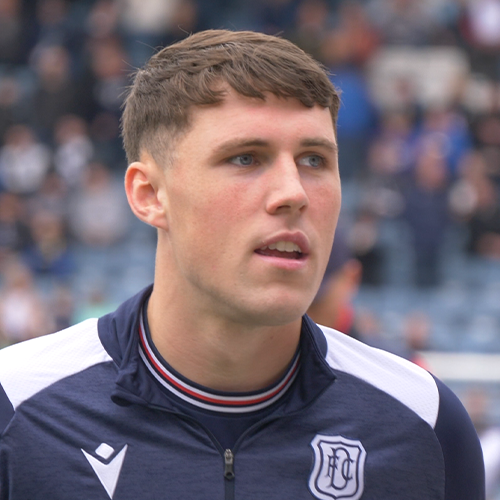
- Mulligan during a Dundee warm-up in 2024

Personal information
- Date of birth: 12 November 2002 (age 23)
- Place of birth: Dundee, Scotland
- Positions: Midfielder; defender

Team information
- Current team: Hibernian
- Number: 8

Youth career
- Dundee

Senior career*
Years	Team	Apps	(Gls)
2019–2025	Dundee	96	(5)
2020	→ Cove Rangers (loan)	8	(0)
2020–2021	→ Peterhead (loan)	0	(0)
2021–2022	→ Peterhead (loan)	19	(3)
2025–	Hibernian	28	(1)

International career^{‡}
2022–2024	Scotland U21	16	(2)
- * Club domestic league appearances and goals as of 3 September 2026 ‡ National team caps and goals as of 22:45, 17 October 2024 (UTC)

Josh Mulligan (born 12 November 2002) is a Scottish professional footballer who plays as either a midfielder or defender for Scottish Premiership club Hibernian. He has previously played for Lochee Harp Boys Club, Dundee, Cove Rangers and Peterhead.

== Club career ==
=== Dundee ===
Mulligan made his first team debut with Dundee in the final game of the 2018–19 season against St Mirren, in which he came on as a substitute. Mulligan would feature in the Scottish League Cup the following season.

In January 2020, Mulligan went on loan with Scottish League Two league leaders Cove Rangers until the end of the season. Despite the early curtailment of the season due to the COVID-19 pandemic, Cove were declared League Two champions after a resolution to finish the season from the SPFL was passed.

In October 2020, Mulligan signed a new contract with Dundee keeping him at the club until 2023, and immediately joined Scottish League One side Peterhead on a season-long loan. Mulligan suffered an ankle injury early on in his club debut against Dundee United, and in November would undergo surgery that would keep him out until the following season.

In June 2021, Mulligan would once again join Peterhead on a season-long loan. Despite this, Mulligan would represent Dundee B against Peterhead in the Scottish Challenge Cup. He would score his first senior goal with the Blue Toon in a 5–0 win against Dumbarton. During his successful 2nd stint with the club, Peterhead teammate and media personality Simon Ferry compared his work-rate to that of Gareth Bale, and described him as "powerful, strong and direct", and as a "Rolls-Royce" footballer.

After a successful first half to the season, Mulligan was recalled early by Dundee in January 2022. He would make his first start for the team in February, in an away victory over Heart of Midlothian. Mulligan would score his first goal for Dundee against his former club Peterhead in the Scottish Cup. His first league goal would come in a 3–1 victory over Hibernian.

Mulligan would score the winner for Dundee's first league win of the 2022–23 season in an away win over Raith Rovers. He followed that up a week later with a fine strike to seal a 4–2 victory over Arbroath. After injuries to teammates, Mulligan would perform well at right-back in the latter half of the season for the Dark Blues and was a key contributor in Dundee winning the Scottish Championship at season's end.

On 3 June 2023, Dundee announced that Mulligan had signed a new two-year contract, keeping him at the club until the summer of 2025. In October, it was announced Mulligan needed surgery on a hernia which would keep him out for several weeks. Mulligan would return in December and would come in and out of the team until being injured again with a hamstring tear in March 2024 which would keep him out for a month or so.

Mulligan left Dundee under freedom of contract after the 2024–25 season was completed, and the club subsequently agreed a compensation package with Hibernian.

=== Hibernian ===
Mulligan signed a four-year contract with Hibernian in June 2025. On 24 July 2025, Mulligan made his first competitive appearance for the Hibees in Denmark away to FC Midtjylland in the UEFA Europa League. On 17 August, Mulligan scored his first Hibernian goal in a Scottish League Cup victory away to Livingston.

== International ==
Mulligan was selected for the Scotland under-21 squad in May 2022. He would make his international debut as a substitute in a goalless draw against Belgium in Group I of the 2023 UEFA European Under-21 Championship qualification. Five days later, he would make his first international start away to Denmark, and played the full 90 minutes in a 1–1 draw. In September 2022, Mulligan would score his first international goal in an away friendly against Northern Ireland.

In October 2025, Mulligan received his first Scotland national football team call-up in advance of the 2026 FIFA World Cup qualifier at home to Belarus. He was an unused substitute in the 2–1 win.

== Career statistics ==
As of 3 September 2026

Club	Season	League			Scottish Cup		League Cup		Continental		Other		Total	
Club	Season	Division	Apps	Goals	Apps	Goals	Apps	Goals	Apps	Goals	Apps	Goals	Apps	Goals
Dundee	2018–19	Scottish Premiership	1	0	0	0	0	0	—		—		1	0
Dundee	2019–20	Scottish Championship	0	0	0	0	3	0	—		0	0	3	0
Dundee	2020–21	Scottish Championship	0	0	0	0	0	0	—		0	0	0	0
Dundee	2021–22	Scottish Premiership	11	2	2	1	0	0	—		—		13	3
Dundee	2022–23	Scottish Championship	31	2	2	0	6	0	—		3 (Note: Appearances in the Scottish Challenge Cup)	0	42	2
Dundee	2023–24	Scottish Premiership	19	1	1	0	4	0	—		0	0	24	1
Dundee	2024–25	Scottish Premiership	34	0	2	0	5	0	—		0	0	41	0
Dundee	Total		96	5	7	1	18	0	0	0	3	0	124	6
Dundee B (Note: Appearances in the Scottish Challenge Cup, in which teams from the SPFL Development League compete against senior clubs)	2021–22	—			—		—		—		1	0	1	0
Cove Rangers (loan)	2019–20	Scottish League Two	8	0	0	0	0	0	—		0	0	8	0
Peterhead (loan)	2020–21	Scottish League One	0	0	0	0	1	0	—		0	0	1	0
Peterhead (loan)	2021–22	Scottish League One	19	3	1	0	4	0	—		0	0	24	3
Hibernian	2025–26	Scottish Premiership	24	1	1	0	2	1	6 (Note: Two appearances in the UEFA Europa League, four appearances and one goal in the UEFA Conference League.)	1	—		33	3
Hibernian	2026–27	Scottish Premiership	4	0	0	0	1	0	6 (Note: Appearance(s) in the UEFA Europa Conference League)	0	0	0	11	0
Hibernian	Total		28	1	1	0	3	1	12	1	0	0	44	3
Career total			151	9	9	1	26	1	12	1	4	0	202	12

== Honours ==
Cove Rangers

- Scottish League Two: 2019–20

Dundee

- Scottish Championship: 2022–23
