= Cammy Kerr =

Scottish footballer (born 1995)

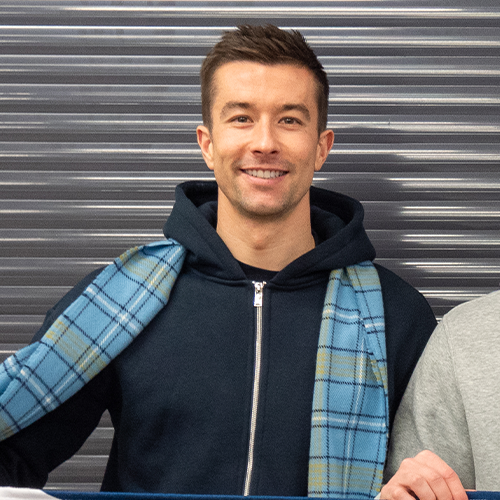
- Kerr in 2024

Personal information
- Full name: Cameron Kerr
- Date of birth: 10 September 1995 (age 31)
- Place of birth: Dundee, Scotland
- Height: 5 ft 11 in (1.80 m)
- Position: Defender

Team information
- Current team: Livingston

Youth career
- 2003–2014: Dundee

Senior career*
Years	Team	Apps	(Gls)
2012–2024	Dundee	216	(5)
2014–2015	→ Peterhead (loan)	22	(3)
2015–2016	→ Peterhead (loan)	10	(0)
2024	→ Inverness Caledonian Thistle (loan)	15	(1)
2024–2025	Queen's Park	15	(1)
2025–	Livingston	13	(0)
- * Club domestic league appearances and goals as of 22:18, 29 August 2026 (UTC)

Cameron Kerr (born 10 September 1995) is a Scottish football player and coach who plays as a defender for Scottish Championship club Livingston.

Kerr spent the majority of his early career with his hometown club Dundee, coming through the youth ranks and making 272 competitive appearances over 11 seasons, earning a testimonial for his time there. He has also had loan spells with Peterhead twice and with Inverness Caledonian Thistle. Kerr then spent a year with Queen's Park.

== Career ==
=== Dundee ===
While growing up, Kerr supported Dundee and was a season ticket holder. Kerr joined the youth ranks of the club in 2003 at the age of 8, and was given his first professional contract in 2012 by manager Barry Smith. He was included in the first team as an unused substitute on the final day of the SPL season in 2012–13 against Hibernian.

In July 2013, Kerr was included in a number of first-team pre-season matches, where he featured as a right back. The first of those appearances came in a 5–1 win over Montrose, which he described as a "dream". Having been at Dundee for a couple of years, Kerr made his breakthrough into the first team in the 2013–2014 season, on 11 January 2014, appearing as a second-half substitute against Livingston. He made his first start on 12 April 2014, as Dundee beat Cowdenbeath. Kerr said making his first start was a great experience, adding that the win made it better. He went on to make two more appearances for Dundee, both as starts, to fill in for the suspended Gary Irvine. The club went on to win the Scottish Championship earning promotion to the Scottish Premiership. At the end of the 2013–14 season, Kerr signed a new deal at Dens Park to remain at the club for a further two years.

Kerr made his Scottish Premiership debut, coming on as a substitute for Jim McAlister in the 43rd minute, in a 2–1 loss against Ross County on 27 September 2014. After making another Premiership appearance, he was loaned out to Peterhead on a one-month loan deal on 6 November 2014.

==== Loans at Peterhead ====
Kerr made his Peterhead debut on 8 November 2014, in a 1–1 draw against Dunfermline Athletic. He scored his first Peterhead goal on 6 December 2014, in a 3–2 win over Stirling Albion. On 9 January 2015, he extended his loan-spell until the end of the 2014–15 Scottish League One season. Weeks after extending his loan spell with the club, Kerr later added two more goals for the season against Stenhousemuir and Forfar Athletic. Kerr went on to make twenty appearances for the club.

Kerr was again loaned to Peterhead for a four-month spell in August 2015 and made a further 10 appearances in the 2015–16 Scottish League One season.

=== Return to Dundee ===
Kerr was recalled from Peterhead early by Dundee in December 2015. He was awarded man-of-the-match in his first Scottish Premiership starting appearance, a Dundee derby victory over Dundee United on 2 January 2016.

Kerr went on to establish himself as a regular starter in the Dundee side. At the end of the 2016–17 season he was awarded the Dundee Player of the Year award alongside picking up the Young Player of the Year trophy for the third time.

At the start of the 2017–18 season Kerr was made vice-captain by manager Neil McCann.

After finding himself in and out of the team during the 2020–21 season, Kerr would be a key figure at both full-back positions as he helped Dundee to win the Premiership play-offs and earn promotion back to the Premiership. At the end of the season, Kerr signed a new two-year deal, entitling him to a testimonial match in the 2022–23 season, having spent ten senior years with Dundee despite being just 27 at season's end.

In July 2022, Kerr scored goals in consecutive games for the first time in his career in the Scottish League Cup for Dundee, already making it his best goalscoring season for The Dark Blues. On 6 January 2023, Kerr was named as captain in his 250th appearance for Dundee. After coming back from an injury in February, Kerr wouldn't play for Dundee until coming on as a substitute in the Scottish Championship title-clinching win away to Queen's Park.

On 30 May 2023, Kerr signed a new two-year extension keeping him with Dundee until 2025. After struggling to get regular game time under new manager Tony Docherty, Kerr was informed in January 2024 that he was told he could find a new club.

==== Inverness Caledonian Thistle (loan) ====
On 25 January 2024, Kerr joined Scottish Championship club Inverness Caledonian Thistle on loan until the end of the season. He made his debut two days later, in an away league victory over Raith Rovers. Kerr scored his first goal for the Caley Jags on 17 February in a league game against Partick Thistle. Kerr would score for Caley in the Championship play-off final against Hamilton Academical, but was unable to stop his side from being relegated to Scottish League One.

On 16 July 2024, Kerr's 21 years of affiliation with Dundee came to an end after both parties agreed to mutually terminate his contract.

=== Queen's Park ===
On 16 July, the same day as leaving Dundee, Kerr signed for Scottish Championship club Queen's Park on a one-year deal with an option for an extension. Kerr made his debut for the Spiders that same day in a Scottish League Cup group stage defeat away to Hibernian. On 21 September, Kerr scored his first goal for Queen's Park in a league game against Ayr United. After a successful month, Kerr was named as the SPFL Scottish Championship Player of the Month for September 2024. After not making an appearance for the Spiders since December due to injury, Kerr departed the club at the end of the season.

=== Livingston ===
On 14 June 2025, Kerr returned to the Scottish Premiership after signing a deal with newly-promoted Livingston. Kerr made his Livingston debut in a 2-1 away defeat against Celtic on 11 February 2026 after a long spell out injured.

== Coaching career ==
In 2023, Kerr coached Scottish amateur side Monifieth Athletic while completing his SFA coaching badges.

== Career statistics ==
As of match played 29 August 2026

Appearances and goals by club, season and competition
Club	Season	League			Scottish Cup		League Cup		Other		Total	
Club	Season	Division	Apps	Goals	Apps	Goals	Apps	Goals	Apps	Goals	Apps	Goals
Dundee	2013–14	Scottish Championship	3	0	0	0	0	0	0	0	3	0
Dundee	2014–15	Scottish Premiership	2	0	0	0	0	0	—		2	0
Dundee	2015–16	Scottish Premiership	10	0	1	0	0	0	—		11	0
Dundee	2016–17	Scottish Premiership	36	1	1	0	4	0	—		41	1
Dundee	2017–18	Scottish Premiership	32	0	3	0	6	0	—		41	0
Dundee	2018–19	Scottish Premiership	28	1	2	0	4	0	—		34	1
Dundee	2019–20	Scottish Championship	22	0	1	0	5	0	1 (Note: Appearances in the Scottish Challenge Cup)	1	29	1
Dundee	2020–21	Scottish Championship	12	1	1	0	3	0	4 (Note: Appearances in the Premiership play-offs)	0	20	1
Dundee	2021–22	Scottish Premiership	35	0	3	0	3	0	0	0	41	0
Dundee	2022–23	Scottish Championship	26	2	2	0	6	2	4	0	38	4
Dundee	2023–24	Scottish Premiership	10	0	0	0	2	0	0	0	12	0
Dundee	Total		216	5	14	0	33	2	9	1	272	8
Peterhead (loan)	2014–15	Scottish League One	22	3	0	0	0	0	0	0	22	3
Peterhead (loan)	2015–16	Scottish League One	10	0	0	0	0	0	1	0	11	0
Inverness Caledonian Thistle (loan)	2023–24	Scottish Championship	15	1	1	0	0	0	4 (Note: Appearance(s) in the Scottish Championship play-offs)	1	20	2
Queen's Park	2024–25	Scottish Championship	15	1	1	0	4	0	1	0	21	1
Livingston	2025–26	Scottish Premiership	11	0	0	0	0	0	0	0	11	0
Livingston	2026–27	Scottish Championship	2	0	0	0	4	0	0	0	6	0
Livingston	Total		13	0	0	0	4	0	0	0	17	0
Career total			291	10	16	0	41	2	15	2	362	14

== Honours ==
Dundee

- Scottish Championship (2): 2013–14, 2022–23
- Scottish Premiership play-offs: 2020–21

Individual

- Scottish Championship Player of the Month: September 2024
