= Corey Panter =

English association football player

Personal information
- Full name: Corey James Rodney Panter
- Date of birth: 19 October 2000 (age 26)
- Place of birth: Hatfield, England
- Height: 1.86 m (6 ft 1 in)
- Positions: Left-back; centre-back

Team information
- Current team: Dagenham & Redbridge
- Number: 6

Youth career
- 2009–2019: Luton Town

Senior career*
Years	Team	Apps	(Gls)
2019–2022	Luton Town	0	(0)
2019	→ Hendon (loan)	4	(0)
2019–2020	→ Biggleswade Town (loan)	11	(0)
2021–2022	→ Dundee (loan)	1	(0)
2022	→ Kidderminster Harriers (loan)	1	(0)
2022–2025	Eastleigh	53	(0)
2024	→ Weymouth (loan)	13	(0)
2025–	Dagenham & Redbridge	37	(0)
- * Club domestic league appearances and goals as of 10:31, 17 April 2026 (UTC)

Corey James Rodney Panter (born 19 October 2000) is an English professional footballer who plays as a defender for National League South side Dagenham & Redbridge.

He came through Luton Town's academy, and during his development there went on loan to Hendon, Biggleswade Town (twice), Dundee and Kidderminster Harriers. After leaving Luton he joined Eastleigh for three years, including a loan spell at Weymouth.

== Career ==
A product of Luton Town's academy, Panter was loaned out to Hendon and Biggleswade Town during the 2019–20 season. However, the 2019–20 Southern Football League season was abandoned and results expunged because of the COVID-19 pandemic in the United Kingdom.

Panter signed a new development contract with Luton on 19 June 2021 and joined Dundee, who were newly promoted to the Scottish Premiership, for pre-season training with a view to a loan move. He signed for Dundee on a season-long loan on 11 July. Panter scored his first goal for the club on his debut, a 5–2 win in the Scottish League Cup against Forfar Athletic. Panter also played for Dundee B in the Scottish Challenge Cup, where he was credited with another goal against Peterhead. On Boxing Day in 2021, Panter made his first league appearance for Dundee away to Aberdeen.

On 2 January 2022, Panter was recalled by Luton. On 21 April, Panter joined National League North side Kidderminster Harriers on loan until the end of the season. Panter made his debut for the Harriers in a league game against Leamington.

On 22 July 2022, after a successful trial period, Panter signed with National League side Eastleigh.

On 15 February 2024, Panter joined National League South club Weymouth on a one-month loan, with manager Bobby Wilkinson calling Panter "a leader" and "a fantastic player". After a short but successful loan spell, Panter returned to Eastleigh in April in a league win over Wealdstone. In June 2024, Panter penned a new one-year contract with Eastleigh. He departed the club at the end of the 2024–25 season.

On 5 June 2025, Panter joined National League South side Dagenham & Redbridge on a one-year deal.

== Career statistics ==
As of match played 11 April 2026

Appearances and goals by club, season and competition
Club	Season	League			National Cup (Note: Includes FA Cup, Scottish Cup)		League Cup (Note: Includes EFL Cup, Scottish League Cup)		Other		Total	
Club	Season	Division	Apps	Goals	Apps	Goals	Apps	Goals	Apps	Goals	Apps	Goals
Luton Town	2018–19	League One	0	0	0	0	0	0	—		0	0
Luton Town	2019–20	Championship	0	0	0	0	0	0	—		0	0
Luton Town	Total		0	0	0	0	0	0	—		0	0
Hendon (loan)	2019–20	SL Premier Division South	4	0	—		—		2 (Note: One appearance and one goal in the Southern Football League Cup, one in London Senior Cup)	1	6	1
Biggleswade Town (loan)	2019–20	SL Premier Division Central	11	0	—		—		0	0	11	0
Dundee (loan)	2021–22	Scottish Premiership	1	0	0	0	1	1	—		2	1
Dundee B (loan)	2021–22	—			—		—		1 (Note: Appearances in the Scottish Challenge Cup, in which teams from the SPFL Development League compete against senior clubs)	1	1	1
Kidderminster Harriers (loan)	2021–22	National League North	1	0	—		—		—		1	0
Eastleigh	2022–23	National League	22	0	0	0	—		2 (Note: Appearances in FA Trophy)	0	24	0
Eastleigh	2023–24	National League	9	0	2	0	—		1	0	12	0
Eastleigh	2024–25	National League	22	0	0	0	—		0	0	22	0
Eastleigh	Total		53	0	2	0	—		3	0	58	0
Weymouth (loan)	2023–24	National League South	13	0	—		—		—		13	0
Dagenham & Redbridge	2025–26	National League South	37	0	1	0	—		3	0	41	0
Career total			120	0	3	0	1	1	9	2	133	3
