= Ryan Sweeney (footballer) =

Irish footballer (born 1997)

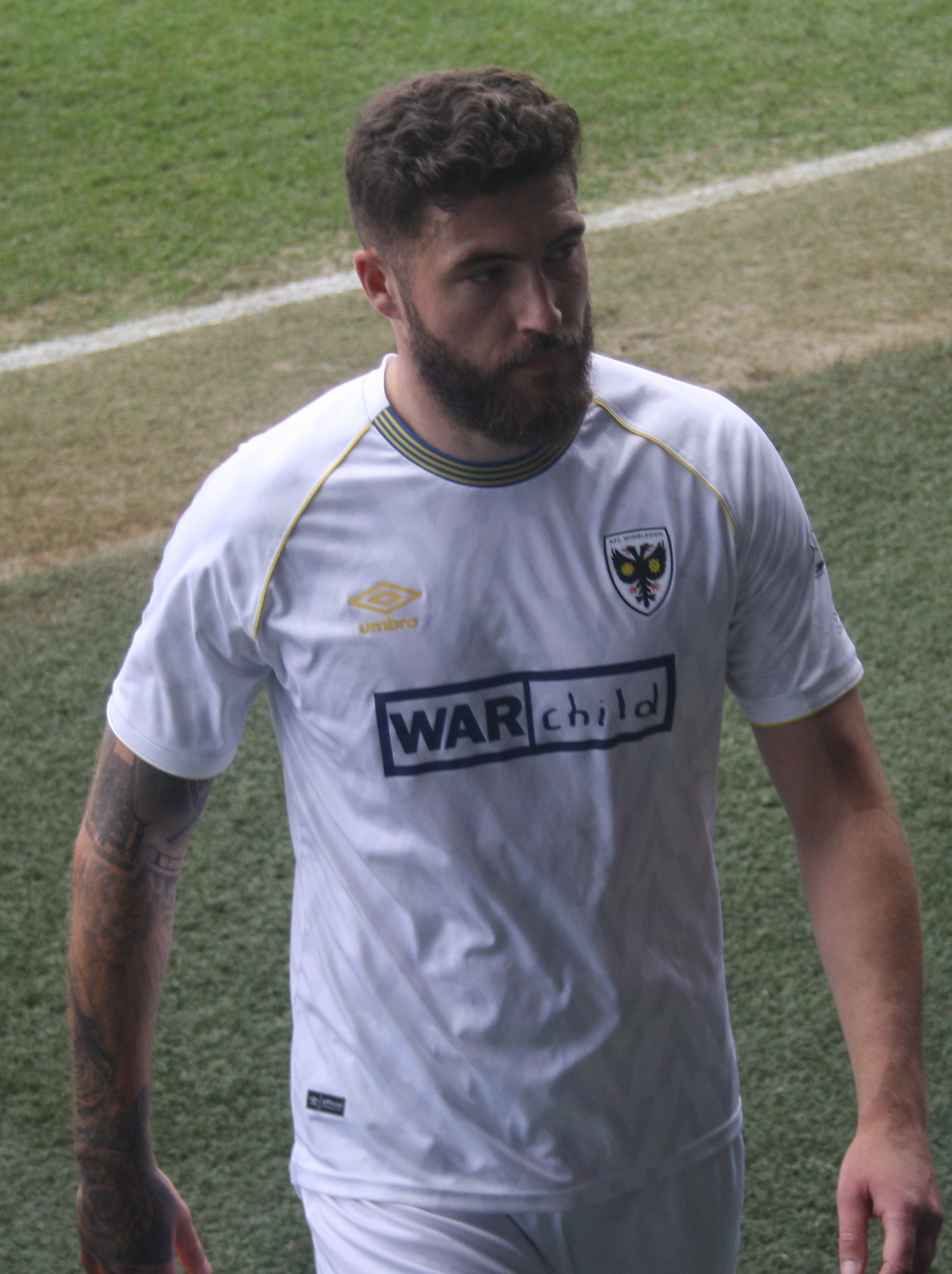
- Sweeney in 2025.

Personal information
- Full name: Ryan Joseph Sweeney
- Date of birth: 15 April 1997 (age 29)
- Place of birth: Kingston upon Thames, England, United Kingdom
- Height: 1.93 m (6 ft 4 in)
- Position: Centre-back

Team information
- Current team: Mansfield Town
- Number: 5

Youth career
- 2005–2015: AFC Wimbledon

Senior career*
Years	Team	Apps	(Gls)
2015–2016	AFC Wimbledon	13	(0)
2016–2019	Stoke City	0	(0)
2017	→ Bristol Rovers (loan)	16	(0)
2017–2018	→ Bristol Rovers (loan)	23	(3)
2018–2019	→ Mansfield Town (loan)	25	(1)
2019–2021	Mansfield Town	82	(4)
2021–2023	Dundee	67	(8)
2023–2025	Burton Albion	80	(3)
2025–	Mansfield Town	36	(2)

International career^{‡}
2015	Republic of Ireland U19	5	(0)
2017–2018	Republic of Ireland U21	10	(0)
- * Club domestic league appearances and goals as of 17:00, 5 September 2026 (UTC) ‡ National team caps and goals as of 22:00, 16 October 2018 (UTC)

Ryan Joseph Sweeney (born 15 April 1997) is a professional footballer who plays as a centre-back for EFL League One club Mansfield Town. Born in England, he has represented the Republic of Ireland internationally.

== Early life ==
Sweeney was born in Kingston upon Thames and attended Richard Challoner School in New Malden where he was captain of the school football team. Sweeney's brother Dan was also in the academy at AFC Wimbledon and currently plays for Stevenage.

== Club career ==
=== AFC Wimbledon ===
Sweeney began his career with his local club AFC Wimbledon, joining their youth academy at the age of eight in 2005. He signed his first professional contract with AFC Wimbledon in February 2015. Sweeney made his Football league début for AFC Wimbledon on 6 April 2015, coming on as an 80th-minute substitute during the 4–0 away loss against Dagenham and Redbridge. He started Wimbledon's next match on 11 April 2015, a 0–0 draw against Oxford United at Kingsmeadow, and was named man of the match.

Sweeney began the 2015–16 season with the club's under-21 side before injury to Karleigh Osborne saw Neal Ardley give Sweeney his chance in defence against Luton Town on 13 February 2016. Wimbledon won the match 4–1 and Sweeney earned praise for his performance. He kept his place in the side until he was sent-off for conceding a penalty in a 2–1 defeat at Morecambe on 12 March 2016. Sweeney signed a new contract with Wimbledon in March 2016 after attracting interest from Premier League clubs Tottenham Hotspur and West Ham United. On 4 August 2016 Wimbledon announced that they had agreed a fee with Stoke City for the transfer of Sweeney.

=== Stoke City ===
On 5 August 2016, Sweeney completed his move to Stoke City for an undisclosed fee, understood to be in the region of £250,000.

==== Bristol Rovers loan ====
On 20 January 2017 Sweeney joined Bristol Rovers on loan for the remainder of the 2016–17 season. He impressed on his debut for the club, keeping a clean sheet in a 1–0 victory over local rivals Swindon Town during which he had a header cleared off the line. He played 16 times for the Gas helping he club finish in 10th position.

Sweeney rejoined The Pirates on loan for the 2017–18 season. He scored his first goal for the Gas in a 3–1 win against Blackpool. Sweeney made 27 appearances in 2017–18 scoring four goals as Rovers finished in 13th position.

=== Mansfield Town ===
Sweeney joined Mansfield Town on loan for the 2018–19 season. After a successful six-month loan, Sweeney signed for the Stags on a permanent basis in January 2019. He helped the club reach the 2018/19 EFL League 2 play offs, where they ultimately lost to Newport County in the semi-final stage. Sweeney left the club in the summer of 2021 after rejecting a new contract in Mansfield to seek a new challenge.

=== Dundee ===
In June 2021, Sweeney signed with Scottish Premiership side Dundee on a two-year deal. He would make his debut from the bench in a 2–2 league draw against St Mirren. Sweeney scored his first goal for Dundee in a league game away to St Johnstone in October 2021. Although the club would be relegated that season, Sweeney impressed enough to be awarded Dundee's Players' Player of the Year and the Andrew De Vries Player of the Year awards.

After taking over the role of captain from the retired Charlie Adam the following season, Sweeney would have a very strong season and would lead Dundee to the Scottish Championship title, and an immediate return to the top flight. Sweeney would be named to PFA Scotland's Scottish Championship Team of the Year at the end of the season, as well as being named in the SPFL's Championship Team of the Season. On 5 June 2023, Dundee announced that Sweeney would leave the club.

=== Burton Albion ===
On 14 July 2023, Sweeney returned to England when he joined League One club Burton Albion on a two-year deal. Sweeney scored his first goal for Burton in an EFL Trophy victory away to Wrexham. At the end of the 2023–24 season, Sweeney was named as Burton's Players' Player of the Year. The following season saw Sweeney retain the award, also winning men's Player of the Season.

On 13 May 2025, the club said it had offered the player a new contract, which Sweeney ultimately rejected.

=== Mansfield Town (second stint) ===
On 20 May 2025, Sweeney returned to former club Mansfield Town on a two-year permanent deal.

== International career ==
On 18 May 2015 Sweeney was called up to the Ireland U-18s squad for the first time.

On 15 March 2017, Sweeney was called up to the Republic of Ireland national under-21 football team for the first time for the Under 21 European Championship qualifier match against Kosovo. He played the whole game as Ireland ran out as 1–0 winners thanks to a 2nd half goal from Olamide Shodipo.

== Career statistics ==
As of match played 5 September 2026

Appearances and goals by club, season and competition
Club	Season	League			National cup		League cup		Other		Total	
Club	Season	Division	Apps	Goals	Apps	Goals	Apps	Goals	Apps	Goals	Apps	Goals
AFC Wimbledon	2014–15	League Two	3	0	0	0	0	0	0	0	3	0
AFC Wimbledon	2015–16	League Two	10	0	0	0	0	0	0	0	10	0
AFC Wimbledon	Total		13	0	0	0	0	0	0	0	13	0
Stoke City	2016–17	Premier League	0	0	0	0	0	0	0	0	0	0
Bristol Rovers (loan)	2016–17	League One	16	0	0	0	0	0	0	0	16	0
Bristol Rovers (loan)	2017–18	League One	23	3	0	0	2	0	2	1	27	4
Bristol Rovers (loan)	Total		39	3	0	0	2	0	2	1	43	4
Mansfield Town	2018–19	League Two	38	1	2	0	2	0	4	0	46	1
Mansfield Town	2019–20	League Two	33	1	2	0	1	0	3	1	39	1
Mansfield Town	2020–21	League Two	36	3	2	0	1	0	3	1	42	5
Mansfield Town	Total		107	5	6	0	4	0	10	2	127	7
Dundee	2021–22	Scottish Premiership	35	3	3	0	0	0	0	0	38	3
Dundee	2022–23	Scottish Championship	32	5	2	0	6	0	4 (Note: Appearances in the Scottish Challenge Cup)	0	44	5
Dundee	Total		67	8	5	0	6	0	4	0	82	8
Burton Albion	2023–24	League One	38	1	1	0	1	0	5 (Note: Appearances in EFL Trophy)	1	45	2
Burton Albion	2024–25	League One	42	2	2	0	1	0	1	1	46	3
Burton Albion	Total		80	3	3	0	2	0	6	2	91	5
Mansfield Town	2025–26	League One	31	2	3	0	2	0	3	0	39	2
Mansfield Town	2026–27	League One	5	0	0	0	1	0	1	0	7	0
Mansfield Town	Total		36	2	3	0	3	0	4	0	46	2
Career total			342	21	17	0	17	0	26	4	402	26

== Honours ==
AFC Wimbledon

- Football League Two play-offs: 2016

Dundee

- Scottish Championship: 2022–23

Individual

- Andrew De Vries Player of the Year: 2021–22
- Players' Player of the Year: 2021–22
- PFA Scotland Scottish Championship Team of the Year: 2022–23
- SPFL Championship Team of the Season: 2022–23
- Burton Albion Players' Player of the Year: 2023–24, 2024–25
