= Zach Robinson =

English footballer (born 2002)

Personal information
- Full name: Zachary Scott Robinson
- Date of birth: 11 June 2002 (age 24)
- Place of birth: Lambeth, England
- Position: Striker

Youth career
- –2017: Lambeth Tigers
- 2017–2019: AFC Wimbledon

Senior career*
Years	Team	Apps	(Gls)
2019–2024	AFC Wimbledon	12	(1)
2019	→ Basingstoke (loan)	4	(3)
2019–2020	→ Leatherhead (loan)	11	(6)
2021	→ Woking (loan)	10	(0)
2021	→ Hemel Hempstead (loan)	2	(1)
2022	→ Hampton & Richmond (loan)	10	(3)
2022–2023	→ Dundee (loan)	29	(12)
2023–2024	→ Dundee (loan)	21	(3)
2024–2026	Motherwell	12	(1)
2026-	Greenock Morton F.C.	1	(0)
- * Club domestic league appearances and goals as of 11:49, 26 September 2026 (UTC)

Zachary Scott Robinson (born 11 June 2002) is an English professional footballer who plays as a striker, most recently for Scottish Premiership club Motherwell. He came through the academy of AFC Wimbledon and made a number of first team appearances, as well as playing on loan for a number of lower league English sides before joining Scottish side Dundee on a season-long loan during which Robinson finished as the team's top league goalscorer and won the Scottish Championship. Robinson returned to Dundee, then in the Scottish Premiership, for another season-long loan before departing AFC Wimbledon.

== Career ==
=== AFC Wimbledon ===
On 9 September 2019, whilst still a second year scholar at AFC Wimbledon, Robinson joined Basingstoke Town on loan. On 13 November 2019, Robinson made his debut for the club in a 3–1 EFL Trophy loss against Southend United. He scored his first goal for Wimbledon in an EFL Trophy tie against Brighton & Hove Albion U21s on 22 September 2020. He made his league debut on 26 December 2020 in a 2–0 defeat to Oxford United, coming off of the bench to replace Ethan Chislett in the 87th minute of the match.

On 12 April 2021, Robinson joined National League side Woking on loan until the end of the season, making his debut the following day as he played the entirety of an incredible 4–3 defeat at home to Bromley.

In August 2021, Robinson joined National League South side, Hemel Hempstead Town on a one-month loan and went onto net on his debut during a 4–2 defeat to Maidstone United, giving the Tudors an early lead in the 36th minute.

On 8 January 2022, Robinson joined National League South side Hampton & Richmond Borough on a one-month loan deal. He went onto feature ten times, scoring three goals before being recalled by Wimbledon in March 2022.

==== Loans to Dundee ====
On 30 July 2022, after signing a two-year contract extension with Wimbledon, Robinson joined Scottish Championship club Dundee on a season-long loan. He made his debut for Dundee on the same day against Partick Thistle. On 12 August, Robinson scored his first goal for Dundee, in a home win over Arbroath. After a very successful first half of the season with Dundee, scoring 8 goals in 19 appearances, Robinson was recalled early by Wimbledon in January 2023.

On 31 January 2023, Robinson returned on loan to Dundee until the end of the season. He marked his league return with the Dark Blues by scoring the opening goal in a 3–0 victory over Cove Rangers. Upon his return he formed a successful striking partnership with Alex Jakubiak. Robinson finished off his excellent loan spell with the Dark Blues in style, scoring his team-leading 12th league goal in a win over Queen's Park which clinched the Scottish Championship title for Dundee.

On 30 June 2023, Robinson re-joined Dundee, now a Scottish Premiership side, on a season-long loan from Wimbledon. He netted a brace against Dumbarton to open his scoring account in his second spell. Robinson would score his first Premiership goal on 11 November in a 4–0 win against St Mirren.

In April 2024, AFC Wimbledon confirmed that Robinson would leave the club upon the expiry of his contract.

=== Motherwell ===
On 20 June 2024, Robinson joined Scottish Premiership club Motherwell on a two-year deal. He made his competitive debut in a win over Edinburgh City in the Scottish League Cup group stage. On 20 September, Robinson scored his first goal for the Steelmen in a Scottish League Cup quarter-final victory over Dundee United which saw Motherwell return to Hampden Park. On 3 December, Motherwell confirmed that Robinson had ruptured his achilles tendon during a training session and would miss the remainder of the season as well as the full season after it.

On 20 May 2026, Motherwell confirmed that Robinson would leave the club when his contract expired that summer.

== Career statistics ==
As of match played 30 November 2024

Appearances and goals by club, season and competition
Club	Season	League			National Cup		League Cup		Other		Total	
Club	Season	Division	Apps	Goals	Apps	Goals	Apps	Goals	Apps	Goals	Apps	Goals
AFC Wimbledon	2019–20	League One	0	0	0	0	0	0	1 (Note: Appearance(s) in the Football League Trophy)	0	1	0
AFC Wimbledon	2020–21	League One	5	0	0	0	0	0	3	1	8	1
AFC Wimbledon	2021–22	League One	6	1	0	0	0	0	0	0	6	1
AFC Wimbledon	2022–23	League Two	1	0	0	0	0	0	0	0	1	0
AFC Wimbledon	Total		12	1	0	0	0	0	4	1	16	2
Basingstoke Town (loan)	2019–20	Southern League Division One South	4	3	—		—		5 (Note: Three appearances and three goals in the FA Trophy, one appearance in the Hampshire Senior Cup, and one appearance in the Southern League Cup)	3	9	6
Leatherhead (loan)	2019–20	Isthmian League Premier Division	11	6	—		—		1 (Note: Appearance(s) in the Alan Turvey Trophy)	0	12	6
Woking (loan)	2020–21	National League	10	0	—		—		—		10	0
Hemel Hempstead Town (loan)	2021–22	National League South	2	1	0	0	—		0	0	2	1
Hampton & Richmond Borough (loan)	2021–22	National League South	10	3	—		—		1	1	11	4
Dundee (loan)	2022–23	Scottish Championship	29	12	0	0	2	1	2 (Note: Appearances in the Scottish Challenge Cup)	0	33	13
Dundee (loan)	2023–24	Scottish Premiership	21	3	1	0	3	3	0	0	25	6
Dundee (loan)	Total		50	15	1	0	5	4	2	0	58	19
Motherwell	2024–25	Scottish Premiership	12	1	0	0	7	1	0	0	19	2
Motherwell	2025–26	Scottish Premiership	0	0	0	0	0	0	0	0	0	0
Motherwell	Total		12	1	0	0	7	1	0	0	19	2
Career total			111	29	1	0	12	5	12	5	137	39

== Honours ==
Dundee

- Scottish Championship: 2022–23
