= Sam Fisher (Scottish footballer) =

Scottish footballer (born 2001)

Personal information
- Date of birth: 26 July 2001 (age 25)
- Place of birth: Tillicoultry, Scotland
- Position: Centre-back

Team information
- Current team: Airdrieonians
- Number: 5

Youth career
- Alloa Athletic
- Dundee

Senior career*
Years	Team	Apps	(Gls)
2019–2023	Dundee	10	(0)
2019–2020	→ East Kilbride (loan)	3	(0)
2020–2021	→ Forfar Athletic (loan)	6	(0)
2021–2022	→ Forfar Athletic (loan)	4	(1)
2022	→ Forfar Athletic (loan)	6	(0)
2022–2023	→ Dunfermline Athletic (loan)	14	(0)
2023–2026	Dunfermline Athletic	30	(0)
2025	→ Stenhousemuir (loan)	11	(0)
2026	→ Kelty Hearts (loan)	14	(1)
2026–	Airdrieonians	6	(0)
- * Club domestic league appearances and goals as of 17:00, 5 September 2026 (UTC)

Sam Fisher (born 26 July 2001) is a Scottish professional footballer who plays as a defender and currently plays for Scottish League One club Airdrieonians. He came through the youth ranks of Dundee and has also played on loan for East Kilbride, Forfar Athletic (in three separate spells) and Dunfermline Athletic, winning the Scottish League One with the latter. Fisher then signed permanently with Dunfermline, and also had loan spells with Stenhousemuir and Kelty Hearts.

== Career ==
=== Dundee ===
==== 2019–20 season ====
Fisher joined Lowland Football League side East Kilbride on loan in September 2019. Fisher's season was cut short due to an ACL injury picked up in a reserve game, which required surgery and kept him out for six to nine months.

==== 2020–21 season ====
After making his return, Fisher signed a new deal with Dundee, keeping him at the club until 2023. He then immediately joined Scottish League One side Forfar Athletic on loan until January. Fisher made his league debut in a scoreless draw at home against Dumbarton. In January 2021, following the three-week suspension of League One by the SFA and SPFL due to the worsening COVID-19 situation in Scotland, Fisher was recalled by Dundee.

Fisher made his first start for Dundee in January 2021, in an away loss to Raith Rovers. He would come on as a substitute in a home win over Arbroath. Fisher would make four league appearances in total during the season, and would be an unused substitute when Dundee defeated Kilmarnock to win the Premiership play-offs and achieve promotion to the Premiership.

==== 2021–22 season ====
In July 2021, Fisher would return on loan to Forfar Athletic, now in the Scottish League Two. In August, Fisher would suffer an injury during training which would "rule him out for some time." After sitting on the bench for the previous few games, Fisher would make his return to the pitch against Angus rivals Arbroath in the Scottish Cup. After making a league start shortly after, Fisher would again suffer injury misfortune, taking a knock which worried manager Gary Irvine. Fortunately this time, Fisher would recover much quicker and would return on Boxing Day, scoring his first senior goal for the Loons in a home game against Stenhousemuir. On 29 January 2022, Fisher was recalled by Dundee. He returned on loan to Forfar on 3 February for the remainder of the season.

==== 2022–23 season ====
On 16 August 2022, Fisher joined Scottish League One side Dunfermline Athletic on a season-long loan. He would make his debut off the bench on 3 September, in an away league victory over Queen of the South. Fisher would be named to SPFL's Team of the Week in October after keeping a clean sheet and creating the winning goal in a league victory over F.C. Edinburgh. After impressing throughout his loan spell with the Pars and helping them top League One, Fisher was recalled by Dundee on 20 January 2023. The following week, Fisher played his first league game of the season for Dundee at right back, and helped defeat league leaders Queen's Park in a 3–0 victory. Fisher would receive two medals in two weeks at the end of the season, after receiving a league winner's medal from Dunfermline Athletic after playing a part in their Scottish League One triumph, and with Dundee after winning the Scottish Championship with them.

=== Dunfermline Athletic ===
Despite being offered a new deal, Fisher decided to leave Dundee in June 2023 and sign permanently for Dunfermline on a three-year deal. Fisher spent the first half of the season interspersed between starting for the Pars and recovering from injuries, including a bad facial injury and two concussions in two weeks in a Fife derby against Raith Rovers in January 2024, but would make his return before the end of the month. However, he suffered a calf injury in training within a week of returning, keeping him out until mid-March, when he came on in a win over Dundee United.

==== Stenhousemuir (loan) ====
On 5 February 2025, Fisher joined Scottish League One club Stenhousemuir on loan until the end of the season. On 22 February, Fisher made his debut for the Warriors in a home league win over Arbroath.

==== Kelty Hearts (loan) ====
On 7 January 2026, Fisher joined Scottish League One club Kelty Hearts on loan until the end of the season. After making 15 appearances and 1 goal for Kelty, Fisher left Dunfermline at the end of the season.

=== Airdrieonians ===
On 5 June 2026, Fisher joined Scottish League One club Airdrieonians on a permanent deal. Fisher scored in his debut on 11 July, scoring a free kick from near the half-way line against his former team Dundee in a Scottish League Cup group stage defeat at Dens Park.

== Career statistics ==
As of 5 September 2026

Appearances and goals by club, season and competition
Club	Season	League			Scottish Cup		League Cup		Other		Total	
Club	Season	Division	Apps	Goals	Apps	Goals	Apps	Goals	Apps	Goals	Apps	Goals
Dundee	2019–20	Scottish Championship	0	0	0	0	0	0	0	0	0	0
Dundee	2020–21	Scottish Championship	4	0	0	0	0	0	0	0	4	0
Dundee	2021–22	Scottish Premiership	0	0	0	0	0	0	0	0	0	0
Dundee	2022–23	Scottish Championship	6	0	—		2	0	0	0	8	0
Dundee	Total		10	0	0	0	2	0	0	0	12	0
East Kilbride (loan)	2019–20	Lowland League	3	0	1	0	0	0	2 (Note: Appearances in the South Challenge Cup.)	0	6	0
Forfar Athletic (loan)	2020–21	Scottish League One	6	0	0	0	3	0	0	0	9	0
Forfar Athletic (loan)	2021–22	Scottish League Two	4	1	1	0	1	0	0	0	6	1
Forfar Athletic (loan)	2021–22	Scottish League Two	6	0	0	0	0	0	2 (Note: Appearances in the League One play-offs)	0	8	0
Dunfermline Athletic (loan)	2022–23	Scottish League One	14	0	1	0	—		2 (Note: Appearances in the Scottish Challenge Cup)	0	17	0
Dunfermline Athletic	2023–24	Scottish Championship	24	0	1	0	4	1	0	0	29	1
Dunfermline Athletic	2024–25	Scottish Championship	5	0	0	0	4	0	2	0	11	0
Dunfermline Athletic	2025–26	Scottish Championship	1	0	0	0	0	0	0	0	1	0
Dunfermline Athletic	Total		44	0	2	0	8	1	4	0	58	1
Stenhousemuir (loan)	2024–25	Scottish League One	11	0	—		—		0	0	11	0
Kelty Hearts (loan)	2025–26	Scottish League One	14	1	1	0	—		0	0	15	1
Airdrieonians	2026–27	Scottish League One	6	0	0	0	4	1	1	0	11	1
Career total			104	2	5	0	18	2	9	0	136	4

== Honours ==
Dundee

- Scottish Championship: 2022–23

Dunfermline Athletic

- Scottish League One: 2022–23
