= 2022–23 Scottish Championship =

Scottish Championship
- Season: 2022–23
- Dates: 30 July 2022 – 5 May 2023
- Champions: Dundee
- Promoted: Dundee
- Relegated: Hamilton Academical (via play-offs); Cove Rangers
- Matches: 180
- Goals: 504 (2.8 per match)
- Top goalscorer: Dipo Akinyemi; 20 goals
- Biggest home win: Dundee 7–0 Hamilton Academical (1 April 2023)
- Biggest away win: Cove Rangers 0–6 Queen's Park (7 January 2023)
- Highest scoring: Hamilton Academical 4–4 Cove Rangers (29 October 2022); Queen's Park 3–5 Dundee (5 May 2023)
- Longest winning run: Inverness Caledonian Thistle; Queen's Park; 6 games
- Longest unbeaten run: Dundee; Greenock Morton; 10 games
- Longest winless run: Cove Rangers; 10 games
- Longest losing run: Hamilton Academical; 7 games
- Highest attendance: 6,862; Dundee 0–0 Cove Rangers (28 April 2023)
- Lowest attendance: 471; Queen's Park 2–1 Cove Rangers (27 August 2022); Queen's Park 1–2 Greenock Morton (4 October 2022)
- Total attendance: 397,031
- Average attendance: 2,205
- All statistics correct as of 5 May 2023.

The 2022–23 Scottish Championship (known as cinch Championship for sponsorship reasons) was the tenth season of the Scottish Championship, the second tier of Scottish football.

Ten teams contested the league: Arbroath, Ayr United, Cove Rangers, Dundee, Greenock Morton, Hamilton Academical, Inverness Caledonian Thistle, Partick Thistle, Queen's Park and Raith Rovers.

== Teams ==
The following teams changed division after the 2021–22 season.

=== To Championship ===
Promoted from League One

- Cove Rangers
- Queen's Park

Relegated from the Premiership

- Dundee

=== From Championship ===
Relegated to League One

- Dunfermline Athletic
- Queen of the South

Promoted to the Premiership

- Kilmarnock

=== Stadia and locations ===
Arbroath	Ayr United	Cove Rangers	Dundee
Gayfield Park	Somerset Park	Balmoral Stadium	Dens Park
Capacity: 6,600	Capacity: 10,185	Capacity: 3,023	Capacity: 11,775
Greenock Morton	Location of teams in 2022–23 Scottish Championship		Hamilton Academical
Cappielow	Location of teams in 2022–23 Scottish Championship		New Douglas Park
Capacity: 11,589	Location of teams in 2022–23 Scottish Championship		Capacity: 6,018
Inverness Caledonian Thistle	Partick Thistle	Queen's Park	Raith Rovers
Caledonian Stadium	Firhill Stadium	Ochilview Park	Stark's Park
Capacity: 7,512	Capacity: 10,102	Capacity: 3,746	Capacity: 8,867

=== Personnel and kits ===
Team	Manager	Captain	Kit manufacturer	Shirt sponsor
Arbroath	(Scotland) Dick Campbell	(Scotland) Thomas O'Brien	Macron	Megatech
Ayr United	(Scotland) Lee Bullen	(Republic of Ireland) Sean McGinty	Hummel	Jewson (Home); Lindsay Mortgage Services (Away)
Cove Rangers	(Scotland) Paul Hartley	(Scotland) Mitch Megginson	Adidas	ACE Group
Dundee	(England) Gary Bowyer	(Republic of Ireland) Ryan Sweeney	Macron	Crown Engineering Services
Greenock Morton	(Scotland) Dougie Imrie	(Scotland) Grant Gillespie	Joma	McGill's
Hamilton Academical	(Scotland) John Rankin	(Scotland) Brian Easton	Adidas	Active Access
Inverness Caledonian Thistle	(Scotland) Billy Dodds	(Scotland) Sean Welsh	Puma	ILI Group
Partick Thistle	(Scotland) Kris Doolan	(Scotland) Ross Docherty	O'Neills	Just Employment Law
Queen's Park	(Republic of Ireland) Owen Coyle	(Scotland) Lee Kilday	Macron	Scotts
Raith Rovers	(Scotland) Ian Murray	(Scotland) Scott Brown	Joma	Dean Park Hotel (Home); Fife Letting Service (Away)

=== Managerial changes ===
Team	Outgoing manager	Manner of departure	Date of vacancy	Position in table	Incoming manager	Date of appointment
Raith Rovers	(Scotland) John McGlynn	End of contract	3 May 2022	Pre-season	(Scotland) Ian Murray	24 May 2022
Dundee	(Scotland) Mark McGhee	End of contract	15 May 2022	Pre-season	(England) Gary Bowyer	8 June 2022
Queen's Park	(Scotland) John Potter	End of interim spell	15 May 2022	Pre-season	(Republic of Ireland) Owen Coyle	1 June 2022
Cove Rangers	(Scotland) Paul Hartley	Signed by Hartlepool United	3 June 2022	Pre-season	(Scotland) Jim McIntyre	15 June 2022
Hamilton Academical	(Scotland) Stuart Taylor	Mutual consent	23 June 2022	Pre-season	(Scotland) John Rankin	28 June 2022
Cove Rangers	(Scotland) Jim McIntyre	Sacked	3 January 2023	8th	(Scotland) Paul Hartley	5 January 2023
Partick Thistle	(Scotland) Ian McCall	Sacked	12 February 2023	5th	(Scotland) Kris Doolan	12 February 2023

== League table ==
Pos	Team	Pld	W	D	L	GF	GA	GD	Pts	Promotion, qualification or relegation
1	Dundee (C, P)	36	17	12	7	66	40	+26	63	Promotion to the Premiership
2	Ayr United	36	16	10	10	61	43	+18	58	Qualification for the Premiership play-off semi-final
3	Queen's Park	36	17	7	12	63	52	+11	58	Qualification for the Premiership play-off quarter-final
4	Partick Thistle	36	16	9	11	65	45	+20	57	Qualification for the Premiership play-off quarter-final
5	Greenock Morton	36	15	12	9	53	43	+10	57	
6	Inverness Caledonian Thistle	36	15	10	11	52	47	+5	55	
7	Raith Rovers	36	11	10	15	46	49	−3	43	
8	Arbroath	36	6	16	14	29	47	−18	34	
9	Hamilton Academical (R)	36	7	10	19	31	63	−32	31	Qualification for the Championship play-offs
10	Cove Rangers (R)	36	7	10	19	38	75	−37	31	Relegation to League One

Rules for classification: 1) Points; 2) Goal difference; 3) Goals scored; 4) Head-to-to head points; 5) Head-to-head goal difference; 6) Play-off (only for deciding promotion, play-off participation and relegation).
(C) Champions; (P) Promoted; (R) Relegated

== Results ==
Teams play each other four times, twice in the first half of the season (home and away) and twice in the second half of the season (home and away), making a total of 180 games, with each team playing 36.

=== First half of season (Matches 1–18) ===
Home \ Away	ARB	AYR	COV	DND	GMO	HAM	ICT	PAR	QPA	RAI
Arbroath	—	0–2	1–1	1–1	1–1	1–0	0–0	0–2	1–2	0–1
Ayr United	0–0	—	2–2	3–1	1–1	2–2	0–1	4–2	5–0	2–0
Cove Rangers	2–0	1–2	—	3–1	1–2	2–2	0–1	1–1	2–0	2–0
Dundee	4–2	2–1	3–0	—	0–0	1–0	2–3	2–3	3–0	2–0
Greenock Morton	1–2	1–2	1–0	0–0	—	5–0	4–0	2–1	3–2	1–0
Hamilton Academical	1–0	2–3	4–4	0–2	1–1	—	2–1	1–2	0–2	0–2
Inverness Caledonian Thistle	1–1	2–2	4–1	0–1	0–1	0–1	—	1–0	1–1	1–1
Partick Thistle	3–0	3–2	2–2	2–3	5–1	1–1	4–1	—	0–4	2–1
Queen's Park	1–1	2–3	2–1	2–2	1–2	4–0	2–1	3–2	—	1–0
Raith Rovers	1–1	3–2	3–0	0–1	2–1	3–1	0–2	3–0	2–5	—

Legend: Blue = home team win; Yellow = draw; Red = away team win.

=== Second half of season (Matches 19–36) ===
Home \ Away	ARB	AYR	COV	DND	GMO	HAM	ICT	PAR	QPA	RAI
Arbroath	—	2–0	0–1	0–0	1–1	0–0	1–4	0–0	1–4	1–2
Ayr United	2–2	—	3–0	0–2	1–1	1–0	1–2	0–1	0–0	1–0
Cove Rangers	1–1	0–5	—	0–2	1–2	2–0	1–2	0–5	0–6	2–2
Dundee	2–4	3–1	0–0	—	3–3	7–0	1–1	1–3	3–0	3–1
Greenock Morton	1–2	1–3	2–1	1–0	—	2–0	1–2	0–0	2–1	1–0
Hamilton Academical	0–0	0–2	1–1	1–1	1–0	—	1–2	2–2	1–4	0–1
Inverness Caledonian Thistle	2–0	1–2	6–1	1–1	2–2	0–3	—	1–0	0–0	2–0
Partick Thistle	2–0	1–1	0–1	0–0	2–1	0–1	5–1	—	4–0	3–0
Queen's Park	0–1	2–0	1–0	3–5	2–2	1–0	2–1	2–0	—	1–1
Raith Rovers	1–1	0–0	6–1	1–1	2–2	1–2	2–2	2–2	2–0	—

Legend: Blue = home team win; Yellow = draw; Red = away team win.

== Season statistics ==
=== Scoring ===
==== Top scorers ====
Rank	Player	Club	Goals
1	(England) Dipo Akinyemi	Ayr United	20
2	(Scotland) Simon Murray	Queen's Park	15
3	(Northern Ireland) Billy Mckay	Inverness CT	13
3	(Scotland) Brian Graham	Partick Thistle	13
5	(England) Zach Robinson	Dundee	12

== Awards ==
Month	Manager of the Month		Player of the Month	
Month	Manager	Club	Player	Club
August	(Scotland) Lee Bullen	Ayr United	(England) Dipo Akinyemi	Ayr United
September/October	(Scotland) Dougie Imrie	Greenock Morton	(Scotland) Robbie Muirhead	Greenock Morton
November	(England) Gary Bowyer	Dundee	(Scotland) Paul McMullan	Dundee
December	(Republic of Ireland) Owen Coyle	Queen's Park	(Scotland) Grant Savoury	Queen's Park
January	(Scotland) Billy Dodds	Inverness CT	(Northern Ireland) Billy Mckay	Inverness CT
February	(Scotland) Dougie Imrie	Greenock Morton	(Scotland) Connor Shields	Queen's Park
March	(England) Gary Bowyer	Dundee	(England) Dipo Akinyemi	Ayr United
April	(Scotland) Billy Dodds	Inverness CT	(Scotland) Kyle Turner	Partick Thistle

The SPFL Championship manager of the year was Gary Bowyer of Dundee.

The SPFL Championship player of the year was Dipo Akinyemi of Ayr United.

== Championship play-offs ==
The semi-finals were contested by the teams placed second to fourth in League One, as well as the team placed ninth in the Championship. The winners advanced to the final, with the highest-ranked team hosting the second leg.

=== Qualified teams ===
Team	Rank
Hamilton Academical	1
Falkirk	2
Airdrieonians	3
Alloa Athletic	4

=== Semi-finals ===
==== First leg ====
9 May 2023	Airdrieonians	6–2	Falkirk	Airdrie
19:45	Devenny 8'; McCabe 14', 90' (pen.); Smith 16'; Taylor-Sinclair 31'; Fordyce 41'		Donaldson 61'; Kennedy 68'	Stadium: Excelsior Stadium; Attendance: 3,272; Referee: Scott Lambie

9 May 2023	Alloa Athletic	1–0	Hamilton Academical	Alloa
19:45	Donnelly 45'			Stadium: Recreation Park; Attendance: 1,011; Referee: Greg Aitken

==== Second leg ====
13 May 2023	Falkirk	0–1 (2–7 agg.)	Airdrieonians	Falkirk
15:00			McGill 42'	Stadium: Falkirk Stadium; Attendance: 4,080; Referee: Euan Anderson

13 May 2023	Hamilton Academical	5–2 (5–3 agg.)	Alloa Athletic	Hamilton
15:00	Zanatta 37', 45'; Winter 39', 45+1', 52'		Sammon 5'; Scougall 32'	Stadium: New Douglas Park; Attendance: 1,353; Referee: Chris Graham

=== Final ===
==== First leg ====
17 May 2023	Airdrieonians	1–0	Hamilton Academical	Airdrie
19:35	Smith 56'			Stadium: Excelsior Stadium; Attendance: 3,118; Referee: Steven Kirkland

==== Second leg ====
20 May 2023	Hamilton Academical	2–1 (a.e.t.) (2–2 agg.) (5–6 p)	Airdrieonians	Hamilton
17:15	C. Smith 23'; Tiéhi 80'	Report	McGill 90+1'	Stadium: New Douglas Park; Attendance: 3,429; Referee: Craig Napier
	Penalties
	Zanatta (penalty scored); McGowan (penalty scored); Winter (penalty scored); C. Smith (penalty scored); Mimnaugh (penalty scored); O'Reilly (penalty missed)		Fordyce (penalty scored); McCabe (penalty scored); Devenny (penalty scored); Frizzell (penalty scored); Gallagher (penalty scored); Ballantyne (penalty scored)
