= 2020–21 Dundee F.C. season =

Dundee
2020–21 season
- Chairman: Tim Keyes
- Manager: James McPake
- Stadium: Dens Park
- Scottish Championship: 2nd
- Scottish Premiership play-offs: Winners (promoted)
- League Cup: Second round
- Scottish Cup: Third round
- Top goalscorer: League: Osman Sow & Jason Cummings (8); All: Osman Sow (10)
Home colours	Away colours	Third colours

The 2020–21 season was Dundee's second season in the second tier of Scottish football since their relegation at the end of the 2018–19 season.

Due to the disruption caused by the COVID-19 pandemic, the teams in the Scottish Championship agreed to shorten the season to 27 games rather than the regular 36, with a start date on 17 October 2020. Dundee will also compete in the League Cup and the Scottish Cup. The club was also set to compete in the Challenge Cup, but the tournament was cancelled due to the financial strain of the ongoing pandemic.

Dundee would earn promotion after winning the Premiership play-offs, defeating both Raith Rovers and Kilmarnock over two legs to return to the Scottish Premiership after a two-year absence.

== Season summary ==
=== Pre-season ===
In the wake of the uncertainty brought on by the COVID-19 pandemic, Dundee would furlough its players and staff, but ensure they would receive their usual salaries. The financial strain caused by the pandemic led to the club needing to cut costs, initially confirming the departure of assistant manager Jimmy Nicholl and asking the players to take wage cuts of up to 30 per cent in June 2020. After discussions lasting several weeks, 12 of the 13 players asked to take cuts agreed, with striker Kane Hemmings the only one to hold out longer. Despite initially agreeing to the wage cut as well, Hemmings decided to renege and leave the club in August. Later that month, Dundee would make cuts to their Youth Academy coaching staff, though the majority of coaches would continue their roles in a voluntary capacity. The club would also appoint former player and first-team coach Dave Mackay as assistant manager.

Dundee would bring in several new players, most notably Dundee-born and ex-Premier League player Charlie Adam, who supported the club as a boy and described signing for the club as a "dream".

=== October ===
Dundee were set to play their first competitive game of the season in the League Cup at home to Forfar Athletic, but the game was called off and Dundee were awarded a 3–0 win by the SPFL following a Forfar player testing positive for COVID-19. They would begin their competitive campaign four days later, in an away win to Highland League champions Brora Rangers. The following week, Dundee would play their first league game of the season away to the recently relegated Heart of Midlothian in a highly anticipated opening game, described by the media as a 'grudge match' after the voting fiasco which marred the end of the previous season, in which a controversial Dundee vote ended the season in March and would lead to Hearts' relegation. In a turbulent game, Dundee would be completely outmatched in a 6–2 thrashing at Tynecastle. After this evisceration, Dundee would pick themselves up and get a much-needed win the following week at home to Greenock Morton, with loanee Jonathan Afolabi scoring his first competitive goal for the club in the 1–0 win. The Dark Blues looked set to repeat this result the following week against newly-promoted Raith Rovers through Charlie Adam's strike, but a late equaliser denied them from taking another 3 points.

=== November ===
Dundee would again struggle away from home, needing inspiration from Adam to score two late goals against part-time Alloa Athletic in order to escape Recreation Park with a point in a wild 3–3 draw. Two days later, midfielder Graham Dorrans would leave the side and move to Australia to play with Western Sydney Wanderers. Returning to League Cup action, Dundee would win comfortably against Scottish League One side Cove Rangers. Despite equalling high-flying Premiership side Hibernian for most of their final group stage game, a late flurry from the Hibees would result in a heavy 4–1 defeat, though Dundee would still qualify for the following round of the cup. Dundee would coincidentally have to play Hibs away once again after drawing them in the next round. Before that, Dundee would return to league action, but would severely disappoint with an awful start in a defeat at Somerset Park against Ayr United. In their League Cup rematch against Hibs at Easter Road, Dundee would fall to their third consecutive defeat in a close 1–0 loss that would knock them out.

=== December ===
In their first home league game in over a month, Dundee would return to winning ways with another tight 1–0 victory against Arbroath through a Paul McGowan solo goal. In a back-and-forth affair at Caledonian Stadium the following week, they would earn a point through a late Jordan McGhee equaliser. Dundee looked to have swept past high-flying league rivals Dunfermline Athletic with a dominant 3–0 lead late on, but a quick collapse allowed the Pars to snatch an unlikely point at Dens Park. Despite the prior week's disappointment, the side put it aside and would record a comfortable Boxing Day win away to Queen of the South through an Osman Sow hat-trick. The Dee would record another three goals and a win three days later at home to Alloa, with Sow scoring a brace to make it 6 goals for him in 3 games and bringing them up to third place in the league.

=== January ===
Dundee would gain a measure of revenge over their opening day humiliation against Hearts with a commanding 3–1 win at Dens, scoring 3 goals in 4 consecutive games for the first time since January 1978, exactly 43 years prior. They would follow up this impressive performance with a much less impressive one, needing a last-minute equaliser and another comeback in extra time to defeat Lowland League side Bonnyrigg Rose Athletic in the Scottish Cup. After a couple of postponed games, Dundee made their return to league action at Gayfield Park against Arbroath. Despite an early lead, Dundee could not hold on or take their chances and had to settle for a point. The club's 8-game unbeaten run would end the following week away to Raith, with an early goal nullified in a 1–3 loss. The month was mired with pitch difficulties at Dens, with games being postponed twice.

=== February ===
A combination of Dens Park's pitch issues and heavy snow brought on by Storm Darcy worked to postpone several games for Dundee throughout February. In their first game in three weeks, Dundee would again suffer a bad defeat, losing at home for the first time in over a year to Queen of the South. The following week, Dundee would come back from behind twice against Morton to take a point at Cappielow.

=== March ===
Dundee would begin March by earning their first league win in 2 months at home to Inverness Caledonian Thistle. They would fall to Hearts at Tynecastle Park the following Saturday. They would fire back to life next week, getting their first clean sheet since December with a 2–0 win at home to Arbroath. Once again however, any hope of consistency was dashed in a thoroughly unimpressive 1–3 defeat at home to Ayr United. They would be able to redeem that performance after just 3 days, getting their second away league win of the season at Recreation Park with a very comfortable win over bottom side Alloa Athletic. Dundee would get consecutive wins in dramatic fashion the following week, coming back from an early 0–2 deficit to defeat play-off rivals Dunfermline Athletic.

=== April ===
The side would start the month with a defeat to St Johnstone that would knock them out of the Scottish Cup. They would quickly shake this off and get some revenge against Ayr United with a strong 0–3 win at Somerset Park. Their positive momentum stalled once again however, with a very late equaliser being needed to take a point at home against Morton. The stalling of momentum continued the following Tuesday with their first goalless draw in 13 months away at East End Park. The side could not take advantage of two Inverness CT players being sent off, with a late goal chopped off and a later one needed to scrape a draw. The Dees would however get an important victory at Dens against Raith Rovers to ensure their place in the Premiership play-offs and give them one last chance at finishing in 2nd. In the final game of the league campaign, a comfortable win over Queen of the South courtesy of a Jason Cummings brace and a defeat for Raith allowed Dundee to sneak into 2nd place.

=== May ===
In the first leg in the Premiership play-off semi-finals, Dundee enjoyed a strong victory at Stark's Park against Raith, taking a 0–3 lead into the second leg. In a nervy affair, Dundee would lose the second leg but were able to go through to the play-off final on aggregate. In the first leg of the final, Dundee would take a lead in the fixture with a 2–1 win over Kilmarnock at Dens, in front of home fans for the first time in 14 months. They would have a similarly exceptional performance at Rugby Park, relegating Kilmarnock and confirming their return to the Scottish Premiership after two years.

== Competitions ==
Win Draw Loss Postponed

All times are in British Summer Time (BST).

=== Pre-season and friendlies ===
15 September 2020	Dundee	1–0	Peterhead	Dens Park, Dundee
19:45	McGowan 40'	Report		Attendance: 0

19 September 2020	Montrose	2–2	Dundee	Links Park, Montrose
14:00	Johnston 27'; Webster 85'	Report	Dorrans 2' (pen.); Ashcroft 47'	Attendance: 0

22 September 2020	Cove Rangers	0–1	Dundee	Balmoral Stadium, Aberdeen
19:45		Report	McGowan 85'	Attendance: 0

26 September 2020	Dundee	1–1	Cove Rangers	Dens Park, Dundee
	R. Strachan 63' (o.g.)	Report	Sc. Ross 50'	Attendance: 0

29 September 2020	Dundee	4–0	Peterhead	Dens Park, Dundee
19:45	Murray 17'; Anderson 30'; Afolabi 36'; Adam 71'	Report		Attendance: 0

=== Scottish Championship ===
Dundee will compete against Alloa Athletic, Arbroath, Ayr United, Dunfermline Athletic, Greenock Morton, Heart of Midlothian, Inverness Caledonian Thistle, Queen of the South, and Raith Rovers in the 2020–21 Championship campaign. They will play each team three times, playing five teams once at home and twice away, and the other four twice at home and once away.

16 October 2020 1	Heart of Midlothian	6–2	Dundee	Tynecastle Park, Edinburgh
19:45	Smith 4'; Ginnelly 25'; Boyce 34' (pen.); Kingsley 45+2', 84'; Halliday 90'	Report	Adam 27'; Mullen 68'	Attendance: 0 Referee: David Munro

24 October 2020 2	Dundee	1–0	Greenock Morton	Dens Park, Dundee
15:00	Afolabi 5'	Report	Muirhead (red card) 73'	Attendance: 0 Referee: Gavin Ross

31 October 2020 3	Dundee	1–1	Raith Rovers	Dens Park, Dundee
15:00	Adam 41'	Report	Musonda 86'	Attendance: 0 Referee: Alan Newlands

6 November 2020 4	Alloa Athletic	3–3	Dundee	Recreation Park, Alloa
19:45	Thomson 31'; Trouten 51', 63'	Report	McDaid 47'; Kerr 76'; Adam 84' (pen.)	Attendance: 0 Referee: Alan Muir

21 November 2020 5	Ayr United	2–0	Dundee	Somerset Park, Ayr
15:00	C. Smith 3'; Moffat 16'	Report		Attendance: 0 Referee: Graham Beaton

5 December 2020 6	Dundee	1–0	Arbroath	Dens Park, Dundee
15:00	McGowan 35'	Report		Attendance: 0 Referee: Chris Graham

12 December 2020 7	Inverness Caledonian Thistle	2–2	Dundee	Caledonian Stadium, Inverness
15:00	Deas 72'; Keatings 75'	Report	Fontaine 37'; McGhee 82'	Attendance: 300; Referee: Craig Napier

19 December 2020 8	Dundee	3–3	Dunfermline Athletic	Dens Park, Dundee
15:00	Adam 35'; Sow 50'; Fontaine 70'	Report	Watson 78'; McManus 82' (pen.), 90+3'	Attendance: 0 Referee: Grant Irvine

26 December 2020 9	Queen of the South	1–3	Dundee	Palmerston Park, Dumfries
15:00	Shields 84'	Report	Sow 13', 21', 54'	Attendance: 0 Referee: Alan Newlands

29 December 2020 10	Dundee	3–1	Alloa Athletic	Dens Park, Dundee
19:45	Sow 49', 73'; Fontaine 54'	Report	Hetherington 11'	Attendance: 0 Referee: Steven Reid

2 January 2021 11	Dundee	3–1	Heart of Midlothian	Dens Park, Dundee
19:20	McGhee 14'; Mullen 36'; Afolabi 84' (pen.)	Report	Irving 56'	Attendance: 0 Referee: Don Robertson

22 January 2021 12	Arbroath	1–1	Dundee	Gayfield Park, Arbroath
19:45	Little 65'	Report	Adam 8' (pen.)	Attendance: 0 Referee: Greg Aitken

30 January 2021 13*	Raith Rovers	3–1	Dundee	Stark's Park, Kirkcaldy
15:00	Benedictus 22'; Tumilty 54'; Kennedy 60'	Report	Sow 5'	Attendance: 0 Referee: Craig Napier
Note: Rearranged due to a conflict with Raith's Scottish Cup fixture. Original date was 12 January.

20 February 2021 14	Dundee	2–3	Queen of the South	Dens Park, Dundee
15:00	Cummings 51'; Marshall 82'	Report	Obileye 2' (pen.); Hamilton 37' (o.g.); Gibson 78'	Attendance: 0 Referee: Barry Cook

27 February 2021 15	Greenock Morton	2–2	Dundee	Cappielow, Greenock
15:00	McGuffie 41'; Colville 69'	Report	Cummings 65'; Mullen 81'	Attendance: 0 Referee: Craig Napier

2 March 2021 16*	Dundee	2–1	Inverness Caledonian Thistle	Dens Park, Dundee
19:00	Anderson 10'; Cummings 45'	Report	Todorov 75'	Attendance: 0 Referee: Steven Kirkland
Note: Rearranged due to a waterlogged pitch. Original date was 5 February.

6 March 2021 17	Heart of Midlothian	2–1	Dundee	Tynecastle Park, Edinburgh
15:00	Halliday 35'; Gnanduillet 58'; Haring (red card) 90+4'	Report	Cummings 63' (pen.)	Attendance: 0 Referee: Don Robertson

13 March 2021 18	Dundee	2–0	Arbroath	Dens Park, Dundee
15:00	Mullen 55'; Anderson 82'	Report		Attendance: 0 Referee: Willie Collum

16 March 2021 19*	Dundee	1–3	Ayr United	Dens Park, Dundee
19:00	Sow 86'	Report	McKenzie 18', 84'; C. Smith 49'	Attendance: 0 Referee: Alan Newlands
Note: Previously rearranged on four separate occasions due to various factors. Original date was 16 January.

19 March 2021 20	Alloa Athletic	0–3	Dundee	Recreation Park, Alloa
19:45		Report	Ashcroft 42', 57'; Anderson 80'	Attendance: 0 Referee: Grant Irvine

27 March 2021 21	Dundee	3–2	Dunfermline Athletic	Dens Park, Dundee
19:20	Cummings 30'; Mullen 54'; Ashcroft 56'	Report	O'Hara 3'; Wighton 6'	Attendance: 0 Referee: Bobby Madden

6 April 2021 22*	Ayr United	0–3	Dundee	Somerset Park, Ayr
19:00		Report	Anderson 68'; Afolabi 74'; McGowan 87'	Attendance: 0 Referee: Steven McLean
Note: Rearranged due to conflicts with new Scottish Cup fixtures. Original date was 3 April.

10 April 2021 23	Dundee	1–1	Greenock Morton	Dens Park, Dundee
15:00	Ashcroft 88'	Report	Nesbitt 78'	Attendance: 0 Referee: Alan Newlands

13 April 2021 24*	Dunfermline Athletic	0–0	Dundee	East End Park, Dunfermline
18:00		Report		Attendance: 0 Referee: Kevin Clancy
Note: Rearranged twice, due to excess snow on the pitch and a positive COVID-19 case for a Dunfermline player respectively. Original date was 12 February.

20 April 2021 25	Inverness Caledonian Thistle	1–1	Dundee	Caledonian Stadium, Inverness
19:00	Allardice (red card) 64'; McKay (red card) 77'; D. MacKay 84'	Report	Ashcroft 86'	Attendance: 0 Referee: Mike Roncone

24 April 2021 26	Dundee	2–1	Raith Rovers	Dens Park, Dundee
15:00	Cummings 13' (pen.); Fontaine 34'	Report	Benedictus 88'; Tait (red card) 90+1'	Attendance: 0 Referee: Willie Collum

30 April 2021 27	Queen of the South	0–2	Dundee	Palmerston Park, Dumfries
19:45		Report	Cummings 17', 34'	Attendance: 0 Referee: Don Robertson

==== League Table ====
Pos	Team	Pld	W	D	L	GF	GA	GD	Pts	Promotion, qualification or relegation
1	Heart of Midlothian (C, P)	27	17	6	4	63	24	+39	57	Promotion to the Premiership
2	Dundee (O, P)	27	12	9	6	49	40	+9	45	Qualification for the Premiership play-off semi-final
3	Raith Rovers	27	12	7	8	45	36	+9	43	Qualification for the Premiership play-off quarter-final
4	Dunfermline Athletic	27	10	9	8	38	34	+4	39	Qualification for the Premiership play-off quarter-final
5	Inverness Caledonian Thistle	27	8	12	7	36	31	+5	36	

Source: SPFL
Rules for classification: 1) Points; 2) Goal difference; 3) Goals scored; 4) Head-to-to head points; 5) Head-to-head goal difference; 6) Play-off (only for deciding promotion, play-off participation and relegation).
(C) Champions; (O) Play-off winners; (P) Promoted

==== Results by round ====
Round	1	2	3	4	5	6	7	8	9	10	11	12	13	14	15	16	17	18	19	20	21	22	23	24	25	26	27
Ground	A	H	H	A	A	H	A	H	A	H	H	A	A	H	A	H	A	H	H	A	H	A	H	A	A	H	A
Result	L	W	D	D	L	W	D	D	W	W	W	D	L	L	D	W	L	W	L	W	W	W	D	D	D	W	W
Position	10	6	7	6	7	6	7	7	4	3	3	3	4	5	5	4	5	4	4	4	3	3	3	3	3	3	2

Source: See results
A = Away; H = Home; W = Win; D = Draw; L = Loss

=== Premiership play-offs ===
As they finished 2nd place in the league, Dundee would enter the Premiership play-offs in the semi-final stages.

==== Semi-final ====
12 May 2021 Play-off SF 1L	Raith Rovers	0–3	Dundee	Stark's Park, Kirkcaldy
19:45		Report	McGhee 22', 55'; Sow 84'	Attendance: 0 Referee: Nick Walsh

15 May 2021 Play-off SF 2L	Dundee	0–1 (3–1 agg.)	Raith Rovers	Dens Park, Dundee
19:45		Report	Vaughan 21'	Attendance: 0 Referee: Don Robertson

==== Final ====
20 May 2021 Play-off Final 1L	Dundee	2–1	Kilmarnock	Dens Park, Dundee
20:15	McGhee 6'; Adam 47'	Report	Haunstrup 77'	Attendance: 500; Referee: John Beaton

24 May 2021 Play-off Final 2L	Kilmarnock	1–2 (2–4 agg.)	Dundee	Rugby Park, Kilmarnock
19:45	Lafferty 69' (pen.)	Report	Mullen 7'; Ashcroft 12'	Attendance: 500; Referee: Bobby Madden

=== Scottish Cup ===
Dundee entered the competition in the 2nd round. The tournament was suspended on 11 January 2021 due to the lockdown restrictions. After being allowed to continue, updated fixture dates were announced on 3 March.

9 January 2021 Second round	Dundee	3–2 (a.e.t.)	Bonnyrigg Rose Athletic	Dens Park, Dundee
19:45	Afolabi 90+4'; Ashcroft 107'; Sow 112'	Report	Currie 25' (pen.), 105+1' (pen.)	Attendance: 0 Referee: Gavin Duncan

3 April 2021 Third round	Dundee	0–1	St Johnstone	Dens Park, Dundee
15:00		Report	Melamed 20'	Attendance: 0 Referee: Craig Napier
Note: Scottish Cup suspended due to the COVID-19 lockdown in Scotland. Original date was 30 January.

=== Scottish League Cup ===
==== Group stage ====
6 October 2020 Group B	Dundee	3–0 (awarded)	Forfar Athletic	Dens Park, Dundee
19:45		Report

10 October 2020 Group B	Brora Rangers	0–2	Dundee	Dudgeon Park, Brora
15:00		Report	Dorrans 11'; Mullen 27'	Attendance: 0 Referee: Barry Cook

10 November 2020 Group B	Dundee	3–0	Cove Rangers	Dens Park, Dundee
19:45	McGowan 6'; Mullen 84'; Adam 87' (pen.)	Report	Yule (red card) 42'; Masson (red card) 54'	Attendance: 0 Referee: Craig Napier

15 November 2020 Group B	Hibernian	4–1	Dundee	Easter Road, Edinburgh
16:30	Mallan 10'; Nisbet 76'; Gullan 80'; Hallberg 82'	Report	Elliott 71'	Attendance: 0 Referee: John Beaton

==== Knockout stage ====
28 November 2020 Second round	Hibernian	1–0	Dundee	Easter Road, Edinburgh
15:00	Murphy 44'	Report		Attendance: 0 Referee: Willie Collum

Notes

1. A: Dundee were awarded a technical 3−0 win over Forfar Athletic who were unable to raise a team after a player tested positive for COVID-19.

==== Group B table ====
Pos	Team	Pld	W	PW	PL	L	GF	GA	GD	Pts	Qualification	HIB	DUN	COV	BRO	FOR
1	Hibernian	4	4	0	0	0	10	3	+7	12	Qualification for the Second round	—	4–1	—	3–1	—
2	Dundee	4	3	0	0	1	9	4	+5	9	Qualification for the Second round	—	—	3–0	—	3–0
3	Cove Rangers	4	1	1	0	2	4	7	−3	5		1–2	—	—	—	1–0
4	Brora Rangers	4	0	0	2	2	6	10	−4	2		—	0–2	2–2p	—	—
5	Forfar Athletic	4	0	1	0	3	3	8	−5	2		0–1	—	—	p3–3	—

Rules for classification: 1) points, 2) goal difference, 3) goals scored, 4) away goals scored, 5) matches won, 6) away matches won, 7) drawing of lots.

== Squad statistics ==
As of 24 May 2021

No.	Pos	Nat	Player	Total		Championship		Scottish Cup		League Cup		Premiership play-offs	
No.	Pos	Nat	Player	Apps	Goals	Apps	Goals	Apps	Goals	Apps	Goals	Apps	Goals
1	GK	(Scotland) SCO	Jack Hamilton	18	0	13	0	1	0	4	0	0	0
2	DF	(Scotland) SCO	Cammy Kerr	20	1	10+2	1	1	0	2+1	0	4	0
3	MF	(Scotland) SCO	Jordan McGhee	22	5	15	2	0	0	3	0	4	3
4	DF	(England) ENG	Liam Fontaine	24	4	17+1	4	2	0	1	0	3	0
7	FW	(Scotland) SCO	Alex Jakubiak	5	0	2+2	0	0	0	1	0	0	0
8	MF	(Scotland) SCO	Shaun Byrne	32	0	18+4	0	2	0	3+1	0	4	0
9	FW	(Scotland) SCO	Danny Mullen	34	8	18+7	5	2	0	3	2	2+2	1
10	MF	(Scotland) SCO	Paul McGowan	35	3	23+2	2	1+1	0	4	1	4	0
11	MF	(Scotland) SCO	Declan McDaid	28	1	13+7	1	1	0	2+2	0	0+3	0
12	GK	(England) ENG	Calum Ferrie	3	0	3	0	0	0	0	0	0	0
13	GK	(England) ENG	Adam Legzdins	16	0	11	0	1	0	0	0	4	0
14	DF	(Scotland) SCO	Lee Ashcroft	33	7	25	5	2	1	2	0	4	1
16	DF	(England) ENG	Christie Elliott	32	1	22+3	0	0	0	4	1	3	0
17	FW	(Republic of Ireland) IRL	Jonathan Afolabi	22	4	4+15	3	0+2	1	1	0	0	0
18	MF	(Scotland) SCO	Paul McMullan	20	0	15	0	1	0	0	0	4	0
19	MF	(Scotland) SCO	Finlay Robertson	10	0	2+4	0	1	0	1+2	0	0	0
20	DF	(Scotland) SCO	Jack Wilkie	1	0	0	0	0	0	0+1	0	0	0
21	FW	(Sweden) SWE	Osman Sow	28	10	11+10	8	1	1	0+2	0	0+4	1
23	DF	(England) ENG	Jordan Marshall	32	1	24	1	2	0	4	0	1+1	0
24	MF	(Scotland) SCO	Max Anderson	26	4	11+8	4	1+1	0	3	0	1+1	0
25	MF	(Scotland) SCO	Lyall Cameron	1	0	0+1	0	0	0	0	0	0	0
26	MF	(Scotland) SCO	Charlie Adam	32	7	17+5	5	2	0	4	1	4	1
27	MF	(Scotland) SCO	Luke Strachan	0	0	0	0	0	0	0	0	0	0
29	DF	(Scotland) SCO	Sam Fisher	4	0	3+1	0	0	0	0	0	0	0
30	GK	(Scotland) SCO	Harrison Sharp	0	0	0	0	0	0	0	0	0	0
31	FW	(Scotland) SCO	Michael Cunningham	0	0	0	0	0	0	0	0	0	0
35	FW	(Australia) AUS	Jason Cummings	18	8	13+2	8	0+1	0	0	0	2	0
39	FW	(Jamaica) JAM	Nicholas Hamilton	1	0	0	0	0	0	0+1	0	0	0
40	MF	(Scotland) SCO	Cammy Blacklock	1	0	0	0	0	0	0+1	0	0	0
42	DF	(Scotland) SCO	Ewan Murray	0	0	0	0	0	0	0	0	0	0
Players away from the club on loan:
15	MF	(Scotland) SCO	Josh Mulligan	0	0	0	0	0	0	0	0	0	0
22	MF	(Scotland) SCO	Callum Moore	2	0	1	0	0+1	0	0	0	0	0
41	DF	(Scotland) SCO	Danny Strachan	0	0	0	0	0	0	0	0	0	0
Players who left the club during the season:
5	DF	(Scotland) SCO	Jordon Forster	5	0	1+2	0	1	0	1	0	0	0
6	MF	(Scotland) SCO	Graham Dorrans	4	1	3	0	0	0	1	1	0	0
6	DF	(England) ENG	Malachi Fagan-Walcott	2	0	2	0	0	0	0	0	0	0

== Transfers ==
=== Summer window ===
==== Players in ====
Date	Player	From	Type
23 July 2020	(Scotland) Lee Ashcroft	(Scotland) Dunfermline Athletic	Free
4 August 2020	(Scotland) Danny Mullen	(Scotland) St Mirren	Free
5 August 2020	(Scotland) Alex Jakubiak	(England) Watford	Free
15 September 2020	(Scotland) Charlie Adam	(England) Reading	Free
28 September 2020	(Jamaica) Nicholas Hamilton	(Canada) York9	Loan
29 September 2020	(Republic of Ireland) Jonathan Afolabi	(Scotland) Celtic	Loan

==== Players out ====
Date	Player	To	Type
29 June 2020	(England) Josh Meekings	Free agent	Contract expired
6 July 2020	(Republic of Ireland) Tom Field	Free agent	Contract expired
6 July 2020	(Scotland) Grant Rodger	Free agent	Contract expired
17 July 2020	(England) Andrew Nelson	(England) Torquay United	Mutual consent
5 August 2020	(England) Kane Hemmings	(England) Burton Albion	Mutual consent
24 September 2020	(Scotland) Kyle Fleming	(Scotland) Annan Athletic	Loan
5 October 2020	(Scotland) Jamie Ness	Free agent	Mutual consent
5 October 2020	(Scotland) Josh Mulligan	(Scotland) Peterhead	Loan

=== Winter window ===
==== Players in ====
Date	Player	From	Type
7 October 2020	(Sweden) Osman Sow	(Scotland) Dundee United	Free
13 November 2020	(England) Adam Legzdins	(England) Burnley	Free
20 November 2020	(England) Liam Fontaine	(Scotland) Ross County	Free
13 January 2021	(Scotland) Lyall Cameron	(Scotland) Peterhead	Return from loan
13 January 2021	(Scotland) Sam Fisher	(Scotland) Forfar Athletic	Return from loan
26 January 2021	(Scotland) Paul McMullan	(Scotland) Dundee United	Loan
28 January 2021	(England) Malachi Fagan-Walcott	(England) Tottenham Hotspur	Loan
28 January 2021	(Australia) Jason Cummings	(England) Shrewsbury Town	Free
1 February 2021	(Scotland) Harrison Sharp	(Scotland) Edinburgh City	Return from loan
1 February 2021	(Scotland) Michael Cunningham	(Scotland) Edinburgh City	Return from loan

==== Players out ====
Date	Player	To	Type
6 October 2020	(Scotland) Lyall Cameron	(Scotland) Peterhead	Loan
9 October 2020	(Scotland) Harrison Sharp	(Scotland) Edinburgh City	Loan
12 October 2020	(Scotland) Sam Fisher	(Scotland) Forfar Athletic	Loan
16 October 2020	(Scotland) Michael Cunningham	(Scotland) Edinburgh City	Loan
8 November 2020	(Scotland) Graham Dorrans	(Australia) Western Sydney Wanderers	Mutual consent
9 March 2021	(Scotland) Callum Moore	(Scotland) Forfar Athletic	Loan
18 March 2021	(England) Malachi Fagan-Walcott	(England) Tottenham Hotspur	Loan ended
19 March 2021	(Scotland) Danny Strachan	(Scotland) Peterhead	Loan
16 April 2021	(Scotland) Jordon Forster	(Scotland) Kelty Hearts	Mutual consent
31 May 2021	(Jamaica) Nicholas Hamilton	(Canada) York United	Loan ended
31 May 2021	(Sweden) Osman Sow	(Thailand) Sukhothai	End of contract
31 May 2021	(Scotland) Jack Hamilton	(Scotland) Greenock Morton	End of contract
31 May 2021	(England) Calum Ferrie	(Scotland) Queen's Park	End of contract
31 May 2021	(Scotland) Michael Cunningham	(Scotland) East Fife	End of contract

== End of season awards ==
=== Club Player of the Year awards ===
- Andrew De Vries Player of the Year: Lee Ashcroft
- Isobel Sneddon Young Player of the Year: Max Anderson
- Players' Player of the Year: Lee Ashcroft

=== National awards ===
Scottish Professional Football League

- Scottish Championship Player of the Month (December 2020): Charlie Adam
- Scottish Championship Manager of the Month (March 2021): James McPake
- Scottish Championship Player of the Year: Charlie Adam
- Scottish Championship Manager of the Year: James McPake
- Scottish Championship Team of the Year: Lee Ashcroft, Paul McMullan, Charlie Adam

PFA Scotland

- Scottish Championship Team of the Year: Lee Ashcroft, Charlie Adam

== See also ==
- List of Dundee F.C. seasons
