= List of Scottish football transfers winter 2018–19 =

This is a list of Scottish football transfers featuring at least one 2018–19 Scottish Premiership club or one 2018–19 Scottish Championship club which were completed after the summer 2018 transfer window closed and before the end of the 2018–19 season.

== List ==
| Date | Name | Moving from | Moving to | Fee |
|---|---|---|---|---|
| 1 September 2018 | Danny Swanson | Hibernian | St Johnstone | Free |
| 2 September 2018 | Clevid Dikamona | Bnei Sakhnin | Heart of Midlothian | Free |
| 3 September 2018 | Gareth McAuley | West Bromwich Albion | Rangers | Free |
| 13 September 2018 | Jim O'Brien | Ross County | Bradford City | Free |
| 14 September 2018 | Ryan Dow | Ross County | Peterhead | Loan |
| 14 September 2018 | Anton Ferdinand | Southend United | St Mirren | Free |
| 15 September 2018 | Ross Cunningham | Hamilton Academical | Forfar Athletic | Loan |
| 16 September 2018 | Sean Clare | Sheffield Wednesday | Heart of Midlothian | Compensation |
| 20 September 2018 | Miquel Nelom | Feyenoord | Hibernian | Free |
| 27 September 2018 | Dean Lyness | Nuneaton Town | St Mirren | Free |
| 28 September 2018 | Simeon Jackson | Walsall | St Mirren | Free |
| 28 September 2018 | Mark Hill | Celtic | Forfar Athletic | Loan |
| 28 September 2018 | Regan Hendry | Celtic | Raith Rovers | Loan |
| 28 September 2018 | PJ Crossan | Celtic | Stranraer | Loan |
| 29 September 2018 | Nicky Maynard | Aberdeen | Bury | Free |
| 1 October 2018 | Prince Buaben | Heart of Midlothian | Falkirk | Free |
| 2 October 2018 | Adam Hammill | Barnsley | St Mirren | Free |
| 17 October 2018 | Charalampos Mavrias | Rijeka | Hibernian | Free |
| 2 November 2018 | Martin Woods | Partick Thistle | Dundee | Free |
| 19 November 2018 | Mustapha Dumbuya | Partick Thistle | Falkirk | Free |
| 23 November 2018 | Ján Mucha | Bruk-Bet Termalica Nieciecza | Hamilton Academical | Free |
| 27 December 2018 | Paul Dixon | Grimsby Town | Falkirk | Free |
| 27 December 2018 | Gary Harkins | Queen of the South | Partick Thistle | Free |
| 30 December 2018 | Adil Nabi | Dundee | OFI Crete | Free |
| 31 December 2018 | Charalampos Mavrias | Hibernian | Omonia | Free |
| 1 January 2019 | Andy Rose | Motherwell | Vancouver Whitecaps FC | Free |
| 1 January 2019 | Josh Campbell | Hibernian | Airdrieonians | Loan |
| 1 January 2019 | Matthew Knox | Livingston | Berwick Rangers | Loan |
| 2 January 2019 | Ryan Bowman | Motherwell | Exeter City | Undisclosed |
| 2 January 2019 | Abdul Osman | Lamia | Falkirk | Free |
| 3 January 2019 | Ross MacLean | Motherwell | Falkirk | Free |
| 3 January 2019 | Ian McShane | St Mirren | Falkirk | Free |
| 3 January 2019 | Jordan Kirkpatrick | St Mirren | Alloa Athletic | Free |
| 3 January 2019 | Adam Hammill | St Mirren | Scunthorpe United | Free |
| 3 January 2019 | Steven Saunders | Livingston | Partick Thistle | Free |
| 3 January 2019 | Conor Hazard | Celtic | Partick Thistle | Loan |
| 3 January 2019 | Ryan Dow | Ross County | Peterhead | Free |
| 4 January 2019 | Josh Heaton | St Mirren | Kidderminster Harriers | Loan |
| 4 January 2019 | Aidan Nesbitt | Milton Keynes Dons | Dundee United | Free |
| 4 January 2019 | Mark Waddington | Stoke City | Falkirk | Loan |
| 4 January 2019 | Shayne Lavery | Everton | Falkirk | Loan |
| 4 January 2019 | Ciaran McKenna | Duke University | Falkirk | Free |
| 4 January 2019 | Kevin McHattie | Derry City | Inverness Caledonian Thistle | Free |
| 4 January 2019 | Joe Cardle | AFC Fylde | Partick Thistle | Free |
| 4 January 2019 | Ally Roy | Derry City | Partick Thistle | Free |
| 4 January 2019 | Nicky Low | Derry City | Queen of the South | Free |
| 4 January 2019 | Barry Maguire | Motherwell | Queen of the South | Loan |
| 5 January 2019 | Oliver Burke | West Bromwich Albion | Celtic | Loan |
| 5 January 2019 | Ross McCormack | Aston Villa | Motherwell | Loan |
| 5 January 2019 | Craig Curran | Dundee United | Dundee | Free |
| 6 January 2019 | Jermain Defoe | Bournemouth | Rangers | Loan |
| 6 January 2019 | Steven Davis | Southampton | Rangers | Loan |
| 7 January 2019 | Gboly Ariyibi | Nottingham Forest | Motherwell | Loan |
| 7 January 2019 | David Vaněček | Teplice | Heart of Midlothian | Free |
| 7 January 2019 | Conor Shaughnessy | Leeds United | Heart of Midlothian | Loan |
| 7 January 2019 | Timothy Weah | Paris Saint-Germain | Celtic | Loan |
| 8 January 2019 | Vakoun Issouf Bayo | Dunajska Streda | Celtic | Undisclosed |
| 8 January 2019 | Greg Tansey | Aberdeen | St Mirren | Free |
| 8 January 2019 | Shaun Rodgers | Greenock Morton | Albion Rovers | Loan |
| 8 January 2019 | Aidan McAdams | Rangers | Annan Athletic | Loan |
| 8 January 2019 | Matthew Henvey | Dundee | Cowdenbeath | Loan |
| 8 January 2019 | Russell Dingwall | Ross County | Stenhousemuir | Loan |
| 9 January 2019 | Marcus Haber | Dundee | Pacific FC | Free |
| 9 January 2019 | Eduardo Herrera | Rangers | Necaxa | Loan |
| 9 January 2019 | Gregg Wylde | Plymouth Argyle | Livingston | Free |
| 9 January 2019 | Jeff King | St Mirren | FC Halifax Town | Free |
| 10 January 2019 | Danny Amankwaa | Heart of Midlothian | SonderjyskE | Free |
| 10 January 2019 | Andrew Davies | Hartlepool United | Dundee | Free |
| 10 January 2019 | Seny Dieng | Queens Park Rangers | Dundee | Loan |
| 10 January 2019 | Mustapha Dumbuya | Falkirk | Phoenix Rising | Free |
| 10 January 2019 | Adam Eckersley | St Mirren | Forfar Athletic | Loan |
| 10 January 2019 | Daniel Hoban | Inverness Caledonian Thistle | Forfar Athletic | Loan |
| 10 January 2019 | Davis Keillor-Dunn | Ross County | Falkirk | Loan |
| 10 January 2019 | Mihai Popescu | Dinamo Bucharest | St Mirren | Loan |
| 10 January 2019 | Cammy Smith | St Mirren | Dundee United | Undisclosed |
| 10 January 2019 | Lewis Spence | Dundee | Ross County | Free |
| 10 January 2019 | Kenny van der Weg | Roeselare | Ross County | Free |
| 11 January 2019 | Dylan Dykes | Ross County | Greenock Morton | Free |
| 11 January 2019 | Morgaro Gomis | Sur | Dundee United | Free |
| 11 January 2019 | Jason Krones | Motherwell | Albion Rovers | Free |
| 11 January 2019 | Ben Armour | Greenock Morton | Dumbarton | Loan |
| 11 January 2019 | Tony Dingwall | Ross County | Raith Rovers | Free |
| 11 January 2019 | Jordan McGregor | Aberdeen | Stirling Albion | Free |
| 11 January 2019 | Conor O'Keefe | St Mirren | Stranraer | Free |
| 11 January 2019 | Ryan Gauld | Sporting Lisbon | Hibernian | Loan |
| 11 January 2019 | Vaclav Hladky | Slovan Liberec | St Mirren | Free |
| 15 January 2019 | Steven Caulker | Dundee | Alanyaspor | Free |
| 15 January 2019 | Brad Lyons | Blackburn Rovers | St Mirren | Loan |
| 15 January 2019 | Andy Dales | Scunthorpe United | Dundee | Loan |
| 15 January 2019 | Chris Erskine | Partick Thistle | Livingston | Undisclosed |
| 15 January 2019 | Steve Davies | Blackpool | Hamilton Academical | Free |
| 15 January 2019 | Ian Harkes | D.C. United | Dundee United | Free |
| 17 January 2019 | Andrew Nelson | Sunderland | Dundee | Undisclosed |
| 17 January 2019 | Dean Lyness | St Mirren | Raith Rovers | Free |
| 17 January 2019 | Lewis Mansell | Blackburn Rovers | Partick Thistle | Loan |
| 17 January 2019 | Max Lowe | Derby County | Aberdeen | Loan |
| 18 January 2019 | Ryan Hardie | Rangers | Livingston | Loan |
| 18 January 2019 | Tony Andreu | Coventry City | Hamilton Academical | Loan |
| 18 January 2019 | Greig Spence | Alloa Athletic | Arbroath | Free |
| 18 January 2019 | Kyle McAllister | Derby County | St Mirren | Loan |
| 18 January 2019 | Jordan Holmes | Bournemouth | St Mirren | Loan |
| 18 January 2019 | Michael O'Halloran | Melbourne City | St Johnstone | Free |
| 18 January 2019 | Greg Stewart | Birmingham City | Aberdeen | Loan |
| 18 January 2019 | Declan Glass | Dundee United | Airdrieonians | Loan |
| 18 January 2019 | Archie Thomas | Dundee United | Stirling Albion | Loan |
| 18 January 2019 | Jack Aitchison | Celtic | Alloa Athletic | Loan |
| 18 January 2019 | Jack Breen | Hamilton Academical | Edinburgh City | Loan |
| 21 January 2019 | Stéphane Oméonga | Genoa | Hibernian | Loan |
| 21 January 2019 | Harry Burgoyne | Wolverhampton Wanderers | Falkirk | Loan |
| 22 January 2019 | Chris Forrester | Aberdeen | St Patrick's Athletic | Free |
| 22 January 2019 | Callum Semple | Sheffield United | Ross County | Free |
| 22 January 2019 | Daniel Armstrong | Raith Rovers | Ross County | Free |
| 23 January 2019 | Andreas Hadenius | Halmstads BK | Dundee | Loan |
| 23 January 2019 | Jack McMillan | Livingston | Partick Thistle | Loan |
| 23 January 2019 | Ross Laidlaw | Hibernian | Dundee United | Loan |
| 23 January 2019 | Matej Rakovan | Dundee United | Fastav Zlín | Free |
| 23 January 2019 | Ciaron Brown | Cardiff City | Livingston | Loan |
| 24 January 2019 | James Horsfield | Scunthorpe United | Dundee | Loan |
| 24 January 2019 | Charlie Seaman | Bournemouth | Dundee United | Loan |
| 24 January 2019 | Darren McCauley | Coleraine | Inverness Caledonian Thistle | Free |
| 24 January 2019 | Aaron Muirhead | Falkirk | Ayr United | Free |
| 24 January 2019 | David Ferguson | Ayr United | Dumbarton | Loan |
| 24 January 2019 | Henk van Schaik | Livingston | Dumbarton | Loan |
| 25 January 2019 | Lewis Toshney | Dundee United | Brechin City | Loan |
| 25 January 2019 | Jack Hamilton | Livingston | Alloa Athletic | Loan |
| 25 January 2019 | Ryan Scully | Greenock Morton | Dunfermline Athletic | Free |
| 25 January 2019 | Andrew Dallas | Rangers | Greenock Morton | Loan |
| 25 January 2019 | Robby McCrorie | Rangers | Greenock Morton | Loan |
| 25 January 2019 | Andy Firth | Barrow | Rangers | Undisclosed |
| 25 January 2019 | Craig McGuffie | Ayr United | Raith Rovers | Loan |
| 25 January 2019 | Anthony McDonald | Heart of Midlothian | Inverness Caledonian Thistle | Loan |
| 26 January 2019 | Anders Dreyer | Brighton & Hove Albion | St Mirren | Loan |
| 26 January 2019 | Mateo Mužek | Shakhter Karagandy | St Mirren | Free |
| 28 January 2019 | Conor McAleny | Fleetwood Town | Kilmarnock | Loan |
| 29 January 2019 | Scott Allardice | Dundee United | Bohemians | Free |
| 29 January 2019 | Niall Keown | Partick Thistle | St Johnstone | Loan |
| 29 January 2019 | Steven Anderson | St Johnstone | Partick Thistle | Loan |
| 29 January 2019 | Andrea Mbuyi-Mutombo | Partick Thistle | Stade Lausanne Ouchy | Free |
| 29 January 2019 | William Edjenguele | Dundee United | Falkirk | Loan |
| 29 January 2019 | Andy Boyle | Preston North End | Ross County | Loan |
| 29 January 2019 | Greg Hurst | St Johnstone | Stenhousemuir | Free |
| 29 January 2019 | Alex Bruce | Wigan Athletic | Kilmarnock | Free |
| 29 January 2019 | Iain Wilson | Kilmarnock | Queen of the South | Loan |
| 30 January 2019 | Jamie Barjonas | Rangers | Raith Rovers | Loan |
| 30 January 2019 | Matt Polster | Chicago Fire | Rangers | Undisclosed |
| 30 January 2019 | Aaron Taylor-Sinclair | Motherwell | Crewe Alexandra | Loan |
| 30 January 2019 | Hakeem Odoffin | Northampton Town | Livingston | Free |
| 30 January 2019 | Lyndon Dykes | Queen of the South | Livingston | Undisclosed |
| 30 January 2019 | Lyndon Dykes | Livingston | Queen of the South | Loan |
| 30 January 2019 | Ahmed Aloulou | Alloa Athletic | Berwick Rangers | Loan |
| 30 January 2019 | Greg Kiltie | Kilmarnock | Greenock Morton | Loan |
| 30 January 2019 | Keelan O'Connell | Bournemouth | Greenock Morton | Loan |
| 30 January 2019 | Sam Kelly | Hamilton Academical | Braintree Town | Free |
| 31 January 2019 | Rakish Bingham | Hamilton Academical | Cheltenham Town | Free |
| 31 January 2019 | Peter Pawlett | Milton Keynes Dons | Dundee United | Undisclosed |
| 31 January 2019 | Mark Connolly | Crawley Town | Dundee United | Undisclosed |
| 31 January 2019 | Calum Butcher | Mansfield Town | Dundee United | Free |
| 31 January 2019 | Mark Reynolds | Aberdeen | Dundee United | Loan |
| 31 January 2019 | Osman Sow | Milton Keynes Dons | Dundee United | Undisclosed |
| 31 January 2019 | Fraser Aird | Dundee United | Queen of the South | Loan |
| 31 January 2019 | Adam Barton | Dundee United | Connah's Quay Nomads | Loan |
| 31 January 2019 | Lewis Morgan | Celtic | Sunderland | Loan |
| 31 January 2019 | Aaron Lennox | Partick Thistle | Cowdenbeath | Loan |
| 31 January 2019 | Cammy Bell | Partick Thistle | St Johnstone | Loan |
| 31 January 2019 | Sean Goss | Queens Park Rangers | St Johnstone | Loan |
| 31 January 2019 | Ethan Robson | Sunderland | Dundee | Loan |
| 31 January 2019 | Ryan McGowan | Bradford City | Dundee | Loan |
| 31 January 2019 | Scott Wright | Aberdeen | Dundee | Loan |
| 31 January 2019 | John O'Sullivan | Blackpool | Dundee | Loan |
| 31 January 2019 | Liam Millar | Liverpool | Kilmarnock | Loan |
| 31 January 2019 | Jordan Rossiter | Rangers | Bury | Loan |
| 31 January 2019 | George Newell | Motherwell | Albion Rovers | Loan |
| 31 January 2019 | Broque Watson | Motherwell | East Fife | Loan |
| 31 January 2019 | David McMillan | St Johnstone | Hamilton Academical | Loan |
| 31 January 2019 | George Oakley | Inverness Caledonian Thistle | Hamilton Academical | Undisclosed |
| 31 January 2019 | Maryan Shved | Karpaty Lviv | Celtic | Undisclosed |
| 31 January 2019 | Maryan Shved | Celtic | Karpaty Lviv | Loan |
| 31 January 2019 | Andrew Gutman | Indiana Hoosiers | Celtic | Free |
| 31 January 2019 | Manny Perez | North Carolina State Wolfpack | Celtic | Free |
| 31 January 2019 | Dom Thomas | Kilmarnock | Dumbarton | Loan |
| 31 January 2019 | Aaron Jarvis | Luton Town | Falkirk | Loan |
| 31 January 2019 | Nikolay Todorov | Rieti | Falkirk | Free |
| 31 January 2019 | Marc McNulty | Reading | Hibernian | Loan |
| 31 January 2019 | Darnell Johnson | Leicester City | Hibernian | Loan |
| 31 January 2019 | Gael Bigirimana | Motherwell | Hibernian | Free |
| 31 January 2019 | Youssouf Mulumbu | Celtic | Kilmarnock | Loan |
| 31 January 2019 | Duckens Nazon | Sint-Truiden | St Mirren | Loan |
| 31 January 2019 | Laurențiu Corbu | Dinamo Bucharest | St Mirren | Loan |
| 31 January 2019 | Jeremy Toljan | Borussia Dortmund | Celtic | Loan |
| 31 January 2019 | Nicky Cadden | Livingston | Ayr United | Loan |
| 31 January 2019 | Calvin Miller | Celtic | Ayr United | Loan |
| 31 January 2019 | Bruce Anderson | Aberdeen | Dunfermline Athletic | Loan |
| 31 January 2019 | Glen Kamara | Dundee | Rangers | Undisclosed |
| 31 January 2019 | Sofien Moussa | Dundee | Concordia Chiajna | Free |
| 31 January 2019 | Kharl Madianga | Dundee | Ekenäs IF | Free |
| 31 January 2019 | Jean Alassane Mendy | Dundee | HamKam | Free |
| 31 January 2019 | Elton Ngwatala | Dundee | AFC Fylde | Free |
| 31 January 2019 | Stefan Scougall | St Johnstone | Carlisle United | Free |
| 31 January 2019 | Billy King | Dundee United | Gillingham | Loan |
| 2 February 2019 | Gary Irvine | St Mirren | Forfar Athletic | Free |
| 5 February 2019 | Carlos Peña | Rangers | GKS Tychy | Free |
| 8 February 2019 | Roarie Deacon | Dundee | Sutton United | Free |
| 15 February 2019 | Efe Ambrose | Hibernian | Derby County | Free |
| 15 February 2019 | Scott McDonald | Dundee United | Partick Thistle | Free |
| 26 February 2019 | Kundai Benyu | Celtic | Helsingborgs IF | Loan |
| 26 February 2019 | Greg Halford | Cardiff City | Aberdeen | Free |
| 28 February 2019 | Jamie Gullan | Hibernian | Raith Rovers | Loan |
| 8 March 2019 | Aidy White | Barnsley | Heart of Midlothian | Free |
| 15 March 2019 | Jonathan Spector | Orlando City SC | Hibernian | Free |
| 29 March 2019 | Deniz Mehmet | Dundee United | Queen of the South | Free |
| 5 April 2019 | Angus Beith | Inverness Caledonian Thistle | Retired | Free |

== See also ==
- List of Scottish football transfers summer 2018
- List of Scottish football transfers summer 2019
