= List of Scottish football transfers winter 2017–18 =

This is a list of Scottish football transfers featuring at least one 2017–18 Scottish Premiership club or one 2017–18 Scottish Championship club which were completed after the summer 2017 transfer window closed and before the end of the 2017–18 season.

== List ==
Date	Name	Moving from	Moving to	Fee
8 September 2017	James McFadden	Motherwell	Queen of the South	Free
8 September 2017	Lawrence Shankland	Aberdeen	Ayr United	Free
11 September 2017	Luke Donnelly	Celtic	Queen's Park	Free
21 September 2017	Jesús García Tena	Hamilton Academical	Edinburgh City	Free
21 September 2017	Clint Hill	Rangers	Carlisle United	Free
22 September 2017	Jamie McCart	Celtic	St Mirren	Loan
27 October 2017	Martin Woods	Ross County	Partick Thistle	Free
27 October 2017	Conner Duthie	Dunfermline Athletic	Forfar Athletic	Loan
31 October 2017	Louis Longridge	Hamilton Academical	Falkirk	Loan
2 November 2017	Scott Shepherd	Falkirk	Edinburgh City	Loan
2 November 2017	Scott Martin	Hibernian	Arbroath	Loan
3 November 2017	Scott Lochhead	Dunfermline Athletic	Forfar Athletic	Loan
9 November 2017	Tony Dingwall	Ross County	Elgin City	Loan
14 November 2017	Luca Gasparotto	Falkirk	Greenock Morton	Loan
16 November 2017	Kelby Mason	Heart of Midlothian	Airdrieonians	Loan
22 November 2017	Youssouf Mulumbu	Norwich City	Kilmarnock	Free
23 November 2017	Reghan Tumilty	Ross County	Falkirk	Loan
23 November 2017	Chris Eagles	Port Vale	Ross County	Free
28 November 2017	David Hopkirk	Dunfermline Athletic	Derry City	Free
30 November 2017	Angus Beith	Heart of Midlothian	Stranraer	Loan
1 December 2017	Oscar Gobern	Ross County	Yeovil Town	Free
1 December 2017	Kevin McNaughton	Inverness Caledonian Thistle	Forfar Athletic	Free
12 December 2017	Danny Mullen	Livingston	St Mirren	Loan
12 December 2017	Steven Boyd	Hamilton Academical	Livingston	Loan
13 December 2017	David McMillan	Dundalk	St Johnstone	Free
16 December 2017	Gennadios Xenodochof	AEL	Motherwell	Free
20 December 2017	Patrick N'Koyi	Dundee United	TOP Oss	Free
22 December 2017	Declan John	Cardiff City	Rangers	Undisclosed
22 December 2017	Ross C. Stewart	St Mirren	Alloa Athletic	Loan
28 December 2017	Niall McGinn	Gwangju	Aberdeen	Free
29 December 2017	Joe Thomson	Celtic	Queen of the South	Loan
30 December 2017	Graham Cummins	St Johnstone	Cork City	Free
1 January 2018	Nathan Austin	Falkirk	Inverness Caledonian Thistle	Free
1 January 2018	Louis Moult	Motherwell	Preston North End	£500,000
1 January 2018	Marvin Compper	RB Leipzig	Celtic	Undisclosed
1 January 2018	Thomas Robson	Sunderland	Falkirk	Free
1 January 2018	Liam Dick	Stranraer	Dumbarton	Free
1 January 2018	Dale Hilson	St Mirren	Forfar Athletic	Free
1 January 2018	Ally Love	Brechin City	Clyde	Free
1 January 2018	Scott Bain	Dundee	Hibernian	Loan
1 January 2018	Craig Henderson	Livingston	Cowdenbeath	Loan
2 January 2018	Sean Welsh	Partick Thistle	Falkirk	Free
2 January 2018	Andrew Nelson	Sunderland	Falkirk	Loan
2 January 2018	Lee Robinson	Queen of the South	Dunfermline Athletic	Free
2 January 2018	Regan Hendry	Celtic	Raith Rovers	Loan
3 January 2018	Sean Goss	Queens Park Rangers	Rangers	Loan
3 January 2018	Craig Slater	Colchester United	Dundee United	Loan
3 January 2018	Curtis Main	Portsmouth	Motherwell	Free
4 January 2018	Ally Gilchrist	St Johnstone	Shamrock Rovers	Free
4 January 2018	Myles Beerman	Rangers	Queen of the South	Loan
4 January 2018	Callum Tapping	Queen of the South	Brechin City	Free
5 January 2018	Brandon Mason	Watford	Dundee United	Loan
5 January 2018	Jordan McGregor	Hamilton Academical	Airdrieonians	Free
5 January 2018	Luca Gasparotto	Falkirk	Greenock Morton	Free
5 January 2018	Lewis Morgan	St Mirren	Celtic	£300,000
5 January 2018	Lewis Morgan	Celtic	St Mirren	Loan
5 January 2018	Louis Longridge	Hamilton Academical	Falkirk	Free
5 January 2018	Liam Henderson	Falkirk	Edinburgh City	Free
5 January 2018	Cameron Blues	Falkirk	Edinburgh City	Loan
5 January 2018	Emil Lyng	KA	Dundee United	Free
5 January 2018	Jordan Thompson	Rangers	Livingston	Loan
5 January 2018	Andrew McDonald	St Mirren	Elgin City	Loan
6 January 2018	Ross Lyon	Rangers	Stranraer	Loan
6 January 2018	Kundai Benyu	Celtic	Oldham Athletic	Loan
7 January 2018	Jamie Murphy	Brighton & Hove Albion	Rangers	Loan
8 January 2018	Jamie Maclaren	Darmstadt 98	Hibernian	Loan
8 January 2018	Jamie Walker	Heart of Midlothian	Wigan Athletic	Undisclosed
9 January 2018	Carlos Peña	Rangers	Cruz Azul	Loan
9 January 2018	Greg Tansey	Aberdeen	Ross County	Loan
9 January 2018	Jérémy Malherbe	Dynamo Brest	Dundee	Free
9 January 2018	Nadir Çiftçi	Celtic	Motherwell	Loan
10 January 2018	Conrad Balatoni	Falkirk	Torquay United	Free
10 January 2018	Chidiebere Nwakali	Manchester City	Aberdeen	Loan
10 January 2018	Chrysovalantis Kozoronis	PAS Giannina	Hamilton Academical	Free
10 January 2018	Darryl Duffy	St Mirren	Airdrieonians	Loan
11 January 2018	Ryan Blair	Swansea City	Falkirk	Loan
11 January 2018	Gregor Buchanan	St Mirren	Livingston	Free
11 January 2018	Danny Mullen	Livingston	St Mirren	Undisclosed
11 January 2018	Demetri Mitchell	Manchester United	Heart of Midlothian	Loan
11 January 2018	Alex Jakubiak	Watford	Falkirk	Loan
11 January 2018	Dale Carrick	Livingston	Airdrieonians	Free
12 January 2018	Danny Williams	Dundee	Accrington Stanley	Free
12 January 2018	Iain Russell	Airdrieonians	Dumbarton	Free
13 January 2018	Jordan Hornby	Dundee United	Cowdenbeath	Free
15 January 2018	Gennadios Xenodochof	Motherwell	AEL	Free
15 January 2018	Ryan Flynn	Oldham Athletic	St Mirren	Free
15 January 2018	Jason Cummings	Nottingham Forest	Rangers	Loan
16 January 2018	Erik Sviatchenko	Celtic	Midtjylland	Loan
16 January 2018	Tom Aldred	Bury	Motherwell	Loan
16 January 2018	Russell Martin	Norwich City	Rangers	Loan
16 January 2018	Mark Hill	Celtic	St Mirren	Loan
17 January 2018	Liam Henderson	Celtic	Bari	Undisclosed
17 January 2018	Paul Allan	Dunfermline Athletic	Hill of Beath Hawthorn	Loan
18 January 2018	Conor Brennan	Ballymena United	Greenock Morton	Free
18 January 2018	Frank Ross	Aberdeen	Greenock Morton	Loan
18 January 2018	Kyle Cameron	Newcastle United	Queen of the South	Loan
18 January 2018	Steven Naismith	Norwich City	Heart of Midlothian	Loan
19 January 2018	Dean Ebbe	Inverness Caledonian Thistle	The New Saints	Free
19 January 2018	Jamie McCart	Celtic	Alloa Athletic	Loan
19 January 2018	James Craigen	Falkirk	Dunfermline Athletic	Free
19 January 2018	Sam Stanton	Hibernian	Dundee United	Free
19 January 2018	Thomas Mikkelsen	Ross County	Dundee United	Loan
19 January 2018	Lee Miller	Falkirk	Livingston	Free
19 January 2018	Jack McMillan	Motherwell	Livingston	Free
19 January 2018	Ryan Hardie	Rangers	Livingston	Loan
19 January 2018	Inih Effiong	Woking	Ross County	Undisclosed
20 January 2018	Faycal Rherras	KV Mechelen	Hibernian	Loan
22 January 2018	Kevin Nisbet	Partick Thistle	Dumbarton	Loan
22 January 2018	Kenny McLean	Aberdeen	Norwich City	Undisclosed
22 January 2018	Kenny McLean	Norwich City	Aberdeen	Loan
23 January 2018	David Ngog	Panionios	Ross County	Free
23 January 2018	Baily Cargill	Bournemouth	Partick Thistle	Loan
24 January 2018	Peter Hartley	Blackpool	Motherwell	Free
24 January 2018	Marios Ogkmpoe	OFI Crete	Hamilton Academical	Free
24 January 2018	Harry Souttar	Stoke City	Ross County	Loan
25 January 2018	Tony Gallacher	Falkirk	Liverpool	£200,000
25 January 2018	Mark Kerr	Falkirk	Ayr United	Free
25 January 2018	Conor Hazard	Celtic	Falkirk	Loan
25 January 2018	Danny Amankwaa	Copenhagen	Heart of Midlothian	Free
25 January 2018	Greg Docherty	Hamilton Academical	Rangers	Undisclosed
26 January 2018	Callumn Morrison	Heart of Midlothian	Brechin City	Loan
26 January 2018	Michael Devlin	Hamilton Academical	Aberdeen	Undisclosed
26 January 2018	Alex Fisher	Motherwell	Yeovil Town	Free
26 January 2018	Cole Stockton	Heart of Midlothian	Carlisle United	Free
26 January 2018	Russell Dingwall	Ross County	Forfar Athletic	Loan
27 January 2018	David Raven	Inverness Caledonian Thistle	Wrexham	Free
28 January 2018	Esmaël Gonçalves	Heart of Midlothian	Pakhtakor Tashkent	£350,000
29 January 2018	James Vincent	Dundee	Dunfermline Athletic	Loan
29 January 2018	Aaron Tshibola	Aston Villa	Kilmarnock	Loan
29 January 2018	Charly Musonda	Chelsea	Celtic	Loan
29 January 2018	Danny Wilson	Rangers	Colorado Rapids	Undisclosed
30 January 2018	Mickel Miller	Carshalton Athletic	Hamilton Academical	Undisclosed
30 January 2018	James McPake	Dundee	Retired	Free
30 January 2018	Tom Beadling	Sunderland	Dunfermline Athletic	Loan
30 January 2018	Krystian Nowak	Heart of Midlothian	Panionios	Free
30 January 2018	Dario Zanatta	Heart of Midlothian	Raith Rovers	Loan
30 January 2018	Harry Paton	Heart of Midlothian	Stenhousemuir	Loan
30 January 2018	Dom Thomas	Kilmarnock	Queen of the South	Loan
30 January 2018	Dylan Mackin	Livingston	Brechin City	Loan
31 January 2018	Deivydas Matulevičius	Hibernian	KuPS	Free
31 January 2018	Florian Kamberi	Grasshopper Club Zürich	Hibernian	Loan
31 January 2018	Glenn Middleton	Norwich City	Rangers	Undisclosed
31 January 2018	Stephen Hendrie	Southend United	Motherwell	Loan
31 January 2018	Daniel Armstrong	Wolverhampton Wanderers	Dunfermline Athletic	Loan
31 January 2018	George Williams	Fulham	St Johnstone	Loan
31 January 2018	Matty Willock	Manchester United	St Johnstone	Loan
31 January 2018	Myles Hippolyte	Falkirk	St Mirren	Free
31 January 2018	Liam Fontaine	Hibernian	Ross County	Free
31 January 2018	Cammy Bell	Kilmarnock	Hibernian	Free
31 January 2018	Aaron Simpson	Wolverhampton Wanderers	Kilmarnock	Loan
31 January 2018	Jasko Keranovic	West Bromwich Albion	Kilmarnock	Loan
31 January 2018	Charlie Scott	Manchester United	Hamilton Academical	Loan
31 January 2018	Grant Gillespie	Hamilton Academical	Dundee United	Free
31 January 2018	Mamason Ledole	Brest	Hamilton Academical	Free
31 January 2018	Sam Cosgrove	Carlisle United	Aberdeen	Undisclosed
31 January 2018	Freddie Woodman	Newcastle United	Aberdeen	Loan
31 January 2018	Joaquim Adão	Sion	Heart of Midlothian	Loan
31 January 2018	Daniel Higgins	Kilmarnock	Airdrieonians	Loan
31 January 2018	Dean Hawkshaw	Kilmarnock	Stranraer	Loan
31 January 2018	Greg Hurst	St Johnstone	Forfar Athletic	Loan
31 January 2018	Matthew Knox	Livingston	East Fife	Loan
31 January 2018	Cammy MacPherson	St Mirren	Stranraer	Loan
31 January 2018	Adam Livingstone	Motherwell	East Fife	Loan
31 January 2018	Daniel Jefferies	Colchester United	Dundee	Loan
31 January 2018	Nicky Low	Dundee	Derry City	Loan
31 January 2018	Max Melbourne	West Bromwich Albion	Ross County	Loan
31 January 2018	Cedwyn Scott	Huddersfield Town	Dundee	Free
31 January 2018	Simon Murray	Hibernian	Dundee	Loan
31 January 2018	Scott Allan	Celtic	Hibernian	Loan
31 January 2018	Scott Bain	Dundee	Celtic	Loan
31 January 2018	Jack Hendry	Dundee	Celtic	Undisclosed
31 January 2018	Harlain Mbayo	Aberdeen	Albion Rovers	Loan
31 January 2018	Kieran Wright	Rangers	Albion Rovers	Loan
31 January 2018	Nikolay Todorov	Heart of Midlothian	Queen of the South	Loan
31 January 2018	Milan Nitrianský	Partick Thistle	Dynamo České Budějovice	Free
31 January 2018	Owain Fôn Williams	Inverness Caledonian Thistle	Indy Eleven	Loan
31 January 2018	Mattias Käit	Fulham	Ross County	Loan
31 January 2018	Darren Barr	Greenock Morton	Stirling Albion	Free
31 January 2018	Callum Smith	Dunfermline Athletic	Alloa Athletic	Loan
1 February 2018	Steven Hammell	Motherwell	Retired	Free
1 February 2018	Leo Fasan	Bury	Kilmarnock	Free
2 February 2018	Genséric Kusunga	União da Madeira	Dundee	Free
5 February 2018	Nick Ross	Dundee	Sepsi OSK	Free
8 February 2018	Steven Caulker	Queens Park Rangers	Dundee	Free
9 February 2018	Anthony Stokes	Hibernian	Apollon Smyrnis	Free
9 February 2018	Aidan Wilson	Rangers	Dumbarton	Loan
9 February 2018	Ally Roy	Heart of Midlothian	Sligo Rovers	Loan
12 February 2018	Kenny van der Weg	Ross County	Hamilton Academical	Free
12 February 2018	Ross Jenkins	Viking FK	Hamilton Academical	Free
15 February 2018	Scott Allardice	Dundee United	East Fife	Loan
16 February 2018	Liam Burt	Rangers	Dumbarton	Loan
20 February 2018	Massimo Donati	Hamilton Academical	St Mirren	Free
21 February 2018	Calum Waters	Kilmarnock	Sligo Rovers	Loan
22 February 2018	Craig Storie	Aberdeen	Brechin City	Free
23 February 2018	Kostadin Gadzhalov	Dundee	Brechin City	Loan
26 February 2018	John Baird	Inverness Caledonian Thistle	Greenock Morton	Loan
5 March 2018	Viktor Noring	Heart of Midlothian	Landskrona BoIS	Free
13 March 2018	Paul Paton	St Johnstone	Plymouth Argyle	Free
13 March 2018	Gary Fraser	Partick Thistle	Greenock Morton	Loan
16 March 2018	Anthony Ralston	Celtic	Dundee United	Loan
20 March 2018	Josh Todd	St Mirren	Queen of the South	Loan
21 March 2018	Bilel Mohsni	ESS	Dundee United	Free
23 March 2018	Niko Kranjcar	Rangers	Retired	Free
30 March 2018	Ioannis Skondras	Hamilton Academical	Lamia	Free
30 March 2018	Chrysovalantis Kozoronis	Hamilton Academical	Ergotelis	Free
30 March 2018	Adam Frizzell	Kilmarnock	Livingston	Loan
4 April 2018	Chris Eagles	Ross County	Oldham Athletic	Free

== See also ==
- List of Scottish football transfers summer 2017
- List of Scottish football transfers summer 2018
