= Michael Cunningham (footballer, born 2001) =

Scottish footballer

Personal information
- Date of birth: 10 March 2001 (age 25)
- Place of birth: Buckhaven, Fife, Scotland
- Position: Forward

Team information
- Current team: Sauchie Juniors
- Number: 18

Youth career
- 2007–2011: East Fife
- 2011–2018: Celtic
- 2018–2021: Dundee

Senior career*
Years	Team	Apps	(Gls)
2019–2021	Dundee	1	(0)
2020	→ Cumbernauld Colts (loan)	5	(3)
2020–2021	→ Edinburgh City (loan)	3	(0)
2021–2024	East Fife	9	(0)
2022–2023	→ Cowdenbeath (loan)	17	(5)
2023	→ Cowdenbeath (loan)	12	(0)
2024–	Sauchie Juniors	2	(0)
- * Club domestic league appearances and goals as of 17:00, 24 February 2024 (UTC)

Michael Cunningham (born 10 March 2001) is a Scottish footballer who plays as a forward for Sauchie Juniors.

== Career ==
=== Dundee ===
Cunningham made his debut for Dundee in the Scottish League Cup, coming off the bench in a game against Peterhead. He made his league debut in January 2020 against Inverness Caledonian Thistle.

At the end of January, Cunningham joined Lowland Football League side Cumbernauld Colts on loan. In his shortened time there due to the COVID-19 pandemic, Cunningham impressed, scoring 3 goals in 5 games, before returning to his parent club.

In October 2020, Cunningham joined Edinburgh City on loan. He made his debut for The Citizens in a 1–5 win against Brechin City.

Cunningham would leave Dundee at the conclusion of his contract in 2021.

=== East Fife and Cowdenbeath loans ===
In July 2021, after a successful trial period, Cunningham signed for local Scottish League One side East Fife. On 9 February 2022, Michael was awarded a contract extension at East Fife until summer 2023. Cunningham scored his first goal for the club in August 2022, in a Scottish Challenge Cup victory over St Johnstone B.

In November 2022, Cunningham signed a one-year extension with East Fife and joined Lowland League club Cowdenbeath on loan for the rest of the season.

On 11 August 2023, Cunningham returned to Cowdenbeath on a loan until January 2024. He would return to East Fife in January for their game against Clyde. He left East Fife by mutual consent on 16 February 2024.

=== Sauchie Juniors ===
On 16 February 2024, the same day as he left East Fife, Cunningham joined East of Scotland Football League Premier Division club Sauchie Juniors on a permanent deal.

== Career statistics ==
As of 24 February 2024

Appearances and goals by club, season and competition
Club	Season	League			Scottish Cup		League Cup		Other		Total	
Club	Season	Division	Apps	Goals	Apps	Goals	Apps	Goals	Apps	Goals	Apps	Goals
Dundee U20	2018–19	—	—		—		—		1 (Note: Appearance in the Scottish Challenge Cup for Dundee under-20/under-21s in which age-restricted sides from the Scottish Premiership clubs compete against senior clubs)	0	1	0
Dundee	2019–20	Scottish Championship	1	0	0	0	1	0	0	0	2	0
Dundee	2020–21	Scottish Championship	0	0	0	0	0	0	0	0	0	0
Dundee	Total		1	0	0	0	1	0	0	0	2	0
Cumbernauld Colts (loan)	2019–20	Lowland League	5	3	0	0	0	0	—		5	3
Edinburgh City (loan)	2020–21	Scottish League Two	3	0	0	0	1	0	0	0	4	0
East Fife	2021–22	Scottish League One	7	0	0	0	3	0	1 (Note: Appearances in the Scottish Challenge Cup)	0	11	0
East Fife	2022–23	Scottish League Two	2	0	1	0	3	0	2	1	8	1
East Fife	2023–24	Scottish League Two	0	0	0	0	0	0	0	0	0	0
East Fife	Total		9	0	1	0	6	0	3	1	19	1
Cowdenbeath (loan)	2022–23	Lowland League	17	5	—		—		0	0	17	5
Cowdenbeath (loan)	2023–24	Lowland League	12	0	2	1	—		3 (Note: Appearance(s) in the South Challenge Cup)	2	17	3
Sauchie Juniors	2023–24	East of Scotland Football League Premier Division	2	0	—		—		0	0	2	0
Career total			49	8	3	1	7	0	7	3	67	12
