= Danny Strachan =

Scottish footballer

Personal information
- Date of birth: 17 July 2002 (age 24)
- Place of birth: Peterhead, Scotland
- Position: Right back

Team information
- Current team: Peterhead
- Number: 2

Youth career
- Aberdeen
- 2019–2020: Dundee
- 2020: → Tayport (loan)

Senior career*
| Years | Team | Apps | (Gls) |
| 2020–2022 | Dundee | 0 | (0) |
| 2020–2021 | → Peterhead (loan) | 7 | (1) |
| 2021–2022 | → Peterhead (loan) | 10 | (0) |
| 2022– | Peterhead | 124 | (1) |
- * Club domestic league appearances and goals as of 17:00, 5 September 2026 (UTC)

Danny Strachan (born 17 July 2002) is a Scottish professional footballer who plays as a defender for Scottish League One side Peterhead.

== Career ==
In September 2019, Strachan moved from Aberdeen's academy to Dundee. After a brief loan to Junior side Tayport that was cut short due to the COVID-19 pandemic, Strachan was named as a member of the first team for the 2020–21 season. In March 2021, Strachan returned to his hometown through joining Scottish League One side Peterhead on loan until the end of the season. Strachan would score his first senior goal with the Blue Toon in an away win over East Fife.

In July 2021, Dundee announced that Strachan had signed a one-year contract extension, and would rejoin Peterhead on loan. Despite this, Strachan would represent Dundee B against Peterhead in the Scottish Challenge Cup.

Strachan would leave Dundee following the ending of his contract in June 2022, and received offers from Peterhead and others following his departure. On 24 June, Strachan would officially return to Peterhead on a one-year deal.

Despite a disappointing season which resulted in relegation, Strachan signed a new three-year contract with Peterhead in May 2023.

On 22 March 2025, Strachan scored his first goal in his permanent deal with Peterhead, scoring a late goal to beat Stirling Albion and move to the top of the Scottish League Two. Strachan won the league with the Blue Toon and earned promotion back to Scottish League One.

== Career Statistics ==
As of 5 September 2026

| Club | Season | League | | | Scottish Cup | | League Cup | | Other | | Total | |
| Club | Season | Division | Apps | Goals | Apps | Goals | Apps | Goals | Apps | Goals | Apps | Goals |
|---|---|---|---|---|---|---|---|---|---|---|---|---|
| Dundee | 2020–21 | Scottish Championship | 0 | 0 | 0 | 0 | 0 | 0 | 0 | 0 | 0 | 0 |
| Dundee | 2021–22 | Scottish Premiership | 0 | 0 | 0 | 0 | 0 | 0 | 0 | 0 | 0 | 0 |
| Dundee | Total | | 0 | 0 | 0 | 0 | 0 | 0 | 0 | 0 | 0 | 0 |
| Dundee B | 2021–22 | — | | | — | | — | | 1 (Note: Appearances in the Scottish Challenge Cup) | 0 | 1 | 0 |
| Peterhead (loan) | 2020–21 | Scottish League One | 7 | 1 | 1 | 0 | 0 | 0 | 0 | 0 | 8 | 1 |
| Peterhead (loan) | 2021–22 | Scottish League One | 10 | 0 | 0 | 0 | 4 | 0 | 0 | 0 | 14 | 0 |
| Peterhead | 2022–23 | Scottish League One | 29 | 0 | 1 | 0 | 4 | 0 | 1 | 0 | 35 | 0 |
| Peterhead | 2023–24 | Scottish League Two | 31 | 0 | 2 | 0 | 4 | 0 | 4 (Note: Two appearances in the Scottish Challenge Cup, two appearances and one goal in the Scottish League One play-offs) | 1 | 41 | 1 |
| Peterhead | 2024–25 | Scottish League Two | 29 | 1 | 1 | 0 | 3 | 0 | 1 | 0 | 34 | 1 |
| Peterhead | 2025–26 | Scottish League One | 29 | 0 | 1 | 0 | 4 | 0 | 4 | 0 | 38 | 0 |
| Peterhead | 2026–27 | Scottish League One | 6 | 0 | 0 | 0 | 4 | 0 | 2 | 0 | 12 | 0 |
| Peterhead | Total | | 124 | 1 | 5 | 0 | 19 | 0 | 12 | 1 | 160 | 2 |
| Career total | | | 141 | 2 | 6 | 0 | 23 | 0 | 13 | 1 | 183 | 3 |

== Honours ==
Peterhead

- Scottish League Two: 2024–25
