= Max Anderson (footballer) =

Scottish footballer (born 2001)

- Anderson playing for the Wellington Phoenix in 2026.

Personal information
- Full name: Max Willocks Anderson
- Date of birth: 17 May 2001 (age 25)
- Place of birth: Dundee, Scotland
- Height: 6 ft 1 in (1.85 m)
- Position: Defensive midfielder

Team information
- Current team: Wellington Phoenix
- Number: 8

Youth career
- –2019: Dundee

Senior career*
Years	Team	Apps	(Gls)
2019–2024	Dundee	68	(6)
2023–2024	→ Inverness Caledonian Thistle (loan)	31	(2)
2024–2026	Crawley Town	59	(5)
2026–	Wellington Phoenix	1	(0)

International career^{‡}
2021	Scotland U21	1	(0)
- * Club domestic league appearances and goals as of 18 October 2026 ‡ National team caps and goals as of 18:28, 7 September 2021 (UTC)

Max Willocks Anderson (born 17 May 2001) is a Scottish professional footballer who plays as a defensive midfielder for A-League Men club Wellington Phoenix. He came through the youth academy of Dundee, and has played for their senior side, as well as Inverness Caledonian Thistle and Crawley Town.

== Career ==
=== Dundee ===
After spending his youth career with Dundee, Anderson signed his first professional contract with the club in April 2019. Anderson would make his professional debut with Dundee in the Scottish Challenge Cup in September 2019, coming off the bench in a loss to Elgin City.

In October 2020, Anderson signed a new contract with Dundee to keep him at the club until 2023. After impressing in friendlies and the Scottish League Cup, Anderson made his league debut for The Dark Blues in an away loss to Heart of Midlothian, and would compete for regular starts after impressing in his games. In March 2021, Anderson would score his first goal for Dundee in a 2–1 home win against Inverness Caledonian Thistle. At the end of the league season, Anderson was awarded Dundee's Isobel Sneddon Young Player of the Year award. Anderson would be a part of the Dundee team which won the Premiership play-offs and gained promotion to the Scottish Premiership.

Anderson notched his first Premiership goal for the club in a 0–1 away win against St Mirren, and would win Man of the Match for his performance. Despite Dundee being relegated, Anderson's consistent and impressive play resulted in him being awarded the Isobel Sneddon Young Player of the Year award for the second successive season.

He scored his first goal of the 2022–23 season against The New Saints in the Scottish Challenge Cup, adding further goals against Cove Rangers and Dunfermline. On 5 November 2022, Anderson came off the bench to play a big part in helping Dundee overturn a 2-goal deficit against Partick Thistle, assisting the winning goal in a 3–2 victory. Anderson would win the Scottish Championship title with Dundee at the end of the season. On 13 June 2023, Dundee announced that Anderson had signed a new two-year deal, keeping him at the club until the summer of 2025.

After falling down the pecking order, Anderson joined Scottish Championship club Inverness Caledonian Thistle on a season-long loan on 28 August 2023. He made his debut on 2 September in a league game against Dunfermline Athletic. Anderson scored his first goal for the Caley Jags on 9 December in an away win over Queen's Park. The season would end negatively, with Inverness being relegated by Hamilton Academical in the Scottish Championship play-off final.

=== Crawley Town ===
On 24 July 2024, Anderson joined EFL League One club Crawley Town for an undisclosed fee on an initial two-year deal. He made his debut in a league-opening win against Blackpool. On 9 November, Anderson scored his first goal for the Red Devils in a league draw at home to Huddersfield Town. On 3 December, Anderson netted the late winner for Crawley away to Charlton Athletic.

On 3 May 2025, Anderson scored the 600,000th goal in The Football League, with a shot into the bottom corner from the edge of the box, to lead Crawley to a 2–1 away victory over Shrewsbury Town.

Following the conclusion of the 2025/26 season Anderson was released at the end of his contract.

=== Wellington Phoenix ===
Anderson playing for the Wellington Phoenix in October 2026.

On 14 September 2026, Anderson moved to New Zealand, joining A-League Men side Wellington Phoenix on a two-year deal. Anderson made his Phoenix debut in a 2–1 win against Melbourne Victory on 18 October 2026 at Hnry Stadium, Wellington.

== International career ==
In August 2021, Anderson received a call-up for the Scotland national under-21 football team for the UEFA European Under-21 Championship qualifier against Turkey. He would make his international debut in this fixture as a substitute.

== Career statistics ==
As of 2 May 2026

Appearances and goals by club, season and competition
Club	Season	League			National cup		League cup		Other		Total	
Club	Season	Division	Apps	Goals	Apps	Goals	Apps	Goals	Apps	Goals	Apps	Goals
Dundee U20	2017–18	—	—		—		—		1 (Note: Appearances in the Scottish Challenge Cup for Dundee under-20/under-21s in which age-restricted sides from the Scottish Premiership clubs compete against senior clubs)	0	1	0
Dundee U20	2018–19	—	—		—		—		1	0	1	0
Dundee U20	2021–22	—	—		—		—		1	0	1	0
Dundee U20	2023–24	—	—		—		—		1	1	1	1
Dundee U20	Total		—		—		—		4	1	4	1
Dundee	2019–20	Scottish Championship	0	0	0	0	0	0	1 (Note: Appearance(s) in the Scottish Challenge Cup)	0	1	0
Dundee	2020–21	Scottish Championship	19	4	2	0	3	0	2 (Note: Appearances in the Scottish Premiership play-offs)	0	26	4
Dundee	2021–22	Scottish Premiership	33	1	3	0	4	0	—		40	1
Dundee	2022–23	Scottish Championship	16	1	2	0	5	0	4	2	27	3
Dundee	2023–24	Scottish Premiership	0	0	0	0	1	0	0	0	1	0
Dundee	Total		68	6	7	0	13	0	7	2	95	8
Inverness Caledonian Thistle (loan)	2023–24	Scottish Championship	31	2	2	0	—		4 (Note: Appearance(s) in the Scottish Championship play-offs)	0	37	2
Crawley Town	2024–25	EFL League One	39	3	2	0	2	0	2 (Note: Appearance(s) in EFL Trophy)	0	45	3
Crawley Town	2025–26	EFL League Two	20	2	1	0	1	0	2	0	24	2
Crawley Town	Total		59	5	3	0	3	0	4	0	69	5
Wellington Phoenix	2026–27	A-League Men	0	0	0	0	—		0	0	0	0
Career total			158	13	12	0	16	0	19	3	205	16

== Honours ==
=== Club ===
Dundee

- Scottish Championship: 2022–23

=== Individual ===
Dundee

- Isobel Sneddon Young Player of the Year: 2020–21, 2021–22
