= List of Scottish football transfers summer 2018 =

This is a list of Scottish football transfers, featuring at least one 2018–19 Scottish Premiership club or one 2018–19 Scottish Championship club, which were completed during the summer 2018 transfer window. The Scottish leagues continued with the standard deadline of 31 August, while other leagues such as those in England and Italy brought forward their deadlines to the start of their league seasons.

== List ==
Date	Name	Moving from	Moving to	Fee
3 May 2018	John Baird	Inverness Caledonian Thistle	Forfar Athletic	Free
8 May 2018	Josh Todd	St Mirren	Queen of the South	Free
9 May 2018	Gary Harkins	Greenock Morton	Queen of the South	Free
9 May 2018	Alan Trouten	Albion Rovers	Alloa Athletic	Free
15 May 2018	Jake Mulraney	Inverness Caledonian Thistle	Heart of Midlothian	Swap
15 May 2018	Angus Beith	Heart of Midlothian	Inverness Caledonian Thistle	Swap
15 May 2018	Tom Walsh	Dumbarton	Inverness Caledonian Thistle	Free
15 May 2018	Iain Vigurs	Inverness Caledonian Thistle	Ross County	Free
15 May 2018	Kari Arnason	Aberdeen	Víkingur	Free
16 May 2018	Allan McGregor	Hull City	Rangers	Free
17 May 2018	Elton Ngwatala	Kidderminster Harriers	Dundee	Free
18 May 2018	Jamie Murphy	Brighton & Hove Albion	Rangers	Undisclosed
18 May 2018	Karl Madianga	Lokomotiv Gorna Oryahovitsa	Dundee	Free
21 May 2018	Darryl Duffy	St Mirren	Airdrieonians	Free
22 May 2018	Darren Jamieson	Hamilton Academical	Arbroath	Free
22 May 2018	James Kellerman	Aldershot Town	St Mirren	Free
23 May 2018	Nicky Clark	Dunfermline Athletic	Dundee United	Free
24 May 2018	Daniel Redmond	Hamilton Academical	The New Saints	Free
24 May 2018	Kris Renton	Alloa Athletic	Cowdenbeath	Free
25 May 2018	Alan Cook	Alloa Athletic	Stenhousemuir	Free
25 May 2018	Mark O'Hara	Dundee	Peterborough United	Compensation
25 May 2018	Paul McGinn	Partick Thistle	St Mirren	Free
27 May 2018	Erik Sviatchenko	Celtic	Midtjylland	£1,000,000
28 May 2018	Jack Hamilton	Heart of Midlothian	Dundee	Undisclosed
28 May 2018	Josh Mullin	Livingston	Ross County	Free
30 May 2018	Zdenek Zlamal	Fastav Zlin	Heart of Midlothian	Free
30 May 2018	Callum Booth	Partick Thistle	Dundee United	Free
30 May 2018	Craig Sibbald	Falkirk	Livingston	Free
31 May 2018	Steven Saunders	The New Saints	Livingston	Free
31 May 2018	Sam Wardrop	Celtic	Dundee United	Free
31 May 2018	Nathan Ralph	Woking	Dundee	Free
31 May 2018	Craig Malcolm	Alloa Athletic	East Kilbride	Free
31 May 2018	Frank McKeown	Alloa Athletic	Free agent	Free
31 May 2018	Adam Martin	Alloa Athletic	Queen's Park	Free
31 May 2018	Ryan Hoggan	Alloa Athletic	Free agent	Free
31 May 2018	Patrick Boyle	Ayr United	Peterhead	Free
31 May 2018	Craig Reid	Ayr United	East Kilbride	Free
31 May 2018	Lyle Avci	Ayr United	Stranraer	Free
31 May 2018	Scott Lochhead	Dunfermline Athletic	Bentleigh Greens	Free
31 May 2018	Julen Etxabeguren	Dundee	Beasain	Free
31 May 2018	Nicky Low	Dundee	Derry City	Free
31 May 2018	Jordan Piggott	Dundee	Bangor City	Free
31 May 2018	Jordie Briels	Dundee United	Oss	Free
31 May 2018	Paul Quinn	Dundee United	Free agent	Free
31 May 2018	Bilel Mohsni	Dundee United	Panachaiki	Free
31 May 2018	Emil Lyng	Dundee United	Haladás	Free
31 May 2018	Georgios Sarris	Hamilton Academical	Petrolul Ploiești	Free
31 May 2018	Xavier Tomas	Hamilton Academical	Red Star	Free
31 May 2018	Nikolay Todorov	Heart of Midlothian	Rieti	Free
31 May 2018	Steven Smith	Kilmarnock	Free agent	Free
31 May 2018	Russell Griffiths	Motherwell	AFC Fylde	Free
31 May 2018	Ellis Plummer	Motherwell	Retired	Free
31 May 2018	Luke Watt	Motherwell	Novigrad	Free
31 May 2018	Dan Carmichael	Queen of the South	Cumnock Juniors	Free
31 May 2018	Jesse Akubuine	Queen of the South	Cumbernauld Colts	Free
31 May 2018	Aaron McCarey	Ross County	Warrenpoint Town	Free
31 May 2018	John Sutton	St Mirren	Retired	Free
31 May 2018	Massimo Donati	St Mirren	Retired	Free
1 June 2018	Shaun Rooney	Queen of the South	Inverness Caledonian Thistle	Free
1 June 2018	Steven MacLean	St Johnstone	Heart of Midlothian	Free
1 June 2018	Scott Bain	Dundee	Celtic	Free
1 June 2018	Lewis Ferguson	Hamilton Academical	Aberdeen	Compensation
1 June 2018	Danny Jardine	St. Johnstone	Stirling Albion	Free
1 June 2018	Craig Curran	Ross County	Dundee United	Free
1 June 2018	Fraser Aird	Dunfermline Athletic	Dundee United	Free
1 June 2018	Jackson Longridge	Livingston	Dunfermline Athletic	Free
1 June 2018	Louis Longridge	Falkirk	Dunfermline Athletic	Free
1 June 2018	Darren Whyte	St. Mirren	Forfar Athletic	Free
2 June 2018	Thomas O'Ware	Greenock Morton	Partick Thistle	Free
4 June 2018	Jamie Lindsay	Celtic	Ross County	Free
4 June 2018	David Galt	Queen's Park	Alloa Athletic	Free
4 June 2018	Greig Spence	Raith Rovers	Alloa Athletic	Free
4 June 2018	Adam Brown	Airdrieonians	Alloa Athletic	Free
5 June 2018	Mark Gillespie	Walsall	Motherwell	Free
5 June 2018	Chris Forrester	Peterborough United	Aberdeen	Undisclosed
6 June 2018	Ryan Edwards	Partick Thistle	Heart of Midlothian	Free
6 June 2018	Declan McManus	Dunfermline Athletic	Ross County	Free
6 June 2018	Robbie Thomson	Falkirk	Raith Rovers	Free
6 June 2018	Chris Millar	St Johnstone	Greenock Morton	Free
6 June 2018	Danny Devine	Partick Thistle	Dunfermline Athletic	Free
6 June 2018	Mark Durnan	Dundee United	Dunfermline Athletic	Free
6 June 2018	Daryll Meggatt	Alloa Athletic	East Fife	Free
6 June 2018	Jordan White	Barrow	Inverness Caledonian Thistle	Free
6 June 2018	Alex Penny	Peterborough United	Hamilton Academical	Undisclosed
7 June 2018	Ovie Ejaria	Liverpool	Rangers	Loan
7 June 2018	Harry Davis	St Mirren	Grimsby Town	Free
7 June 2018	Liam Donnelly	Hartlepool United	Motherwell	Undisclosed
8 June 2018	Gregor Buchanan	Livingston	Greenock Morton	Free
8 June 2018	Conner Duthie	Dunfermline Athletic	Stenhousemuir	Free
8 June 2018	Liam Kelly	Rangers	Livingston	Undisclosed
9 June 2018	Bobby Burns	Glenavon	Heart of Midlothian	Undisclosed
9 June 2018	John Rankin	Queen of the South	Clyde	Free
9 June 2018	Kevin Holt	Dundee	Pafos FC	Free
9 June 2018	Jérémy Malherbe	Dundee	Panionios	Free
10 June 2018	Mark Lamont	Partick Thistle	Clyde	Free
10 June 2018	Ricki Lamie	Greenock Morton	Livingston	Free
11 June 2018	Leo Fasan	Kilmarnock	Falkirk	Free
11 June 2018	Ross Forbes	Greenock Morton	Dumbarton	Free
11 June 2018	Callum Crane	Hibernian	Livingston	Undisclosed
12 June 2018	Charlie Telfer	Almere City	Greenock Morton	Free
12 June 2018	Nikola Katić	Slaven Belupo	Rangers	Undisclosed
12 June 2018	Jason Naismith	Ross County	Peterborough United	Undisclosed
13 June 2018	Joe Dodoo	Rangers	Blackpool	Loan
13 June 2018	Connor Goldson	Brighton & Hove Albion	Rangers	Undisclosed
13 June 2018	Jim McAlister	Blackpool	Greenock Morton	Free
13 June 2018	Danny Johnson	Gateshead	Motherwell	Free
13 June 2018	Graham Taylor	Dundee United	Edinburgh City	Free
14 June 2018	Florian Kamberi	Grasshopper Club Zürich	Hibernian	Undisclosed
14 June 2018	Jordan Thompson	Rangers	Blackpool	Free
14 June 2018	Jamie McCart	Celtic	Inverness Caledonian Thistle	Free
14 June 2018	Anthony O'Connor	Aberdeen	Bradford City	Free
14 June 2018	Thomas Mikkelsen	Ross County	Breiðablik	Free
15 June 2018	Frederic Frans	Lierse	Dundee United	Free
15 June 2018	Scott Harrison	Hartlepool United	Falkirk	Free
15 June 2018	Odsonne Édouard	Paris Saint-Germain	Celtic	£9,000,000
15 June 2018	Joe Thomson	Celtic	Dunfermline Athletic	Free
15 June 2018	Christopher Routis	Ross County	Servette	Free
16 June 2018	Max Ashmore	Ross County	Stranraer	Free
17 June 2018	Michael O'Halloran	Rangers	Melbourne City	Undisclosed
18 June 2018	Jason Holt	Rangers	Fleetwood Town	Loan
18 June 2018	Willo Flood	Dundee United	Dunfermline Athletic	Free
18 June 2018	Gary Fraser	Partick Thistle	Forfar Athletic	Free
18 June 2018	Tom Owen-Evans	Newport County	Falkirk	Undisclosed
18 June 2018	Sean McGinty	Torquay United	Partick Thistle	Free
18 June 2018	Benjamin Siegrist	Vaduz	Dundee United	Free
18 June 2018	Matej Rakovan	Vysočina Jihlava	Dundee United	Free
19 June 2018	Stephen Gleeson	Ipswich Town	Aberdeen	Free
19 June 2018	Cameron Blues	Falkirk	Livingston	Free
19 June 2018	Ruben Sammut	Chelsea	Falkirk	Loan
19 June 2018	Deimantas Petravičius	Motherwell	Falkirk	Free
19 June 2018	Aaron Taylor-Sinclair	Plymouth Argyle	Motherwell	Free
19 June 2018	Neil Alexander	Livingston	Retired	Free
19 June 2018	Christoph Rabitsch	Wolfsberger AC	Dundee United	Free
20 June 2018	Oliver Bozanic	Melbourne City	Heart of Midlothian	Free
20 June 2018	Alex Rodriguez	Sepsi Sfântu Gheorghe	Motherwell	Free
21 June 2018	Rory Loy	Falkirk	Dumbarton	Free
21 June 2018	Dimitris Froxylias	Dumbarton	Falkirk	Free
21 June 2018	Aidan Connolly	York City	Dunfermline Athletic	Free
21 June 2018	Ross MacLean	Motherwell	Greenock Morton	Loan
21 June 2018	Ryan Scully	Partick Thistle	Greenock Morton	Free
21 June 2018	Grant Gillespie	Dundee United	Raith Rovers	Free
21 June 2018	Harry Paton	Heart of Midlothian	Ross County	Free
21 June 2018	Jon Flanagan	Liverpool	Rangers	Free
21 June 2018	Peter Haring	SV Ried	Heart of Midlothian	Free
21 June 2018	Keith Watson	St Johnstone	Ross County	Free
21 June 2018	Callum Morris	Dunfermline Athletic	Ross County	Free
21 June 2018	Josh Heaton	Darlington	St Mirren	£75,000
21 June 2018	Cody Cooke	Truro City	St Mirren	Free
22 June 2018	Jeff King	Bolton Wanderers	St Mirren	Free
23 June 2018	John Cunningham	Alloa Athletic	Albion Rovers	Free
23 June 2018	Conor Brennan	Greenock Morton	Brechin City	Free
23 June 2018	Ziggy Gordon	Pogoń Siedlce	Hamilton Academical	Free
23 June 2018	Paul Paton	Plymouth Argyle	Falkirk	Free
23 June 2018	Aaron Lennox	Raith Rovers	Partick Thistle	Free
24 June 2018	Mason Bloomfield	Norwich	Hamilton Academical	Loan
24 June 2018	Tom Taiwo	Falkirk	Hamilton Academical	Free
25 June 2018	Aaron Smith	Nottingham Forest	Hamilton Academical	Free
25 June 2018	Sam Kelly	Grimsby Town	Hamilton Academical	Free
25 June 2018	Aaron McGowan	Morecambe	Hamilton Academical	Free
25 June 2018	Stelios Demetriou	St Mirren	Ross County	Free
25 June 2018	Andrew Davies	Ross County	Hartlepool United	Free
25 June 2018	Jon McLaughlin	Heart of Midlothian	Sunderland	Free
25 June 2018	Jean Alassane Mendy	Lokeren	Dundee	Free
25 June 2018	Ryan Hardie	Rangers	Livingston	Loan
25 June 2018	Kenny van der Weg	Hamilton Academical	Roeselare	Free
26 June 2018	Stuart Armstrong	Celtic	Southampton	£7,000,000
26 June 2018	Daniel Harvie	Aberdeen	Ayr United	Free
26 June 2018	Lennard Sowah	Cracovia	Hamilton Academical	Free
26 June 2018	Denny Johnstone	Colchester United	Greenock Morton	Free
26 June 2018	Cammy Ballantyne	Dundee United	Dumbarton	Free
27 June 2018	Peter Grant	Falkirk	Plymouth Argyle	Free
27 June 2018	Willo Flood	Dunfermline Athletic	Bali United	Free
27 June 2018	Blair Malcolm	Ross County	Cowdenbeath	Free
28 June 2018	Gary Warren	Inverness Caledonian Thistle	Yeovil Town	Free
28 June 2018	Dan Turner	Port Vale	Falkirk	Loan
29 June 2018	Kyle Gourlay	Dundee	Elgin City	Loan
29 June 2018	Calum Ferrie	Dundee	Stirling Albion	Loan
29 June 2018	Derek Lyle	Queen of the South	Peterhead	Free
30 June 2018	Kenny Miller	Rangers	Livingston	Free
1 July 2018	Nadir Ciftci	Celtic	Gençlerbirliği	Free
1 July 2018	David Bates	Rangers	Hamburg	Compensation
1 July 2018	Uche Ikpeazu	Cambridge United	Heart of Midlothian	Free
1 July 2018	Olly Lee	Luton Town	Heart of Midlothian	Free
1 July 2018	Alan Mannus	St Johnstone	Shamrock Rovers	Free
1 July 2018	Drey Wright	Colchester United	St Johnstone	Free
1 July 2018	Tom Dallison	Brighton & Hove Albion	Falkirk	Free
1 July 2018	Scott Arfield	Burnley	Rangers	Free
1 July 2018	Patrick Brough	Morecambe	Falkirk	Free
1 July 2018	Dennon Lewis	Watford	Falkirk	Free
1 July 2018	Tom Beadling	Sunderland	Dunfermline Athletic	Free
1 July 2018	Ben Garuccio	Adelaide United	Heart of Midlothian	Free
1 July 2018	Dean Shiels	Dunfermline Athletic	Derry City	Free
1 July 2018	Cammy Bell	Hibernian	Partick Thistle	Free
2 July 2018	Adam Bogdan	Liverpool	Hibernian	Loan
2 July 2018	Dylan McGeouch	Hibernian	Sunderland	Free
2 July 2018	Jack Storer	Birmingham City	Partick Thistle	Free
2 July 2018	Shea Gordon	Motherwell	Partick Thistle	Loan
3 July 2018	Gavin Reilly	St. Mirren	Bristol Rovers	Free
3 July 2018	James Vincent	Dundee	Dunfermline Athletic	Loan
3 July 2018	Kerr Waddell	Dundee	Greenock Morton	Loan
3 July 2018	Jason Talbot	Dunfermline Athletic	Cowdenbeath	Free
3 July 2018	Nat Wedderburn	Dunfermline Athletic	Raith Rovers	Free
4 July 2018	Stuart Findlay	Newcastle United	Kilmarnock	Free
4 July 2018	Mikael Ndjoli	Bournemouth	Kilmarnock	Loan
4 July 2018	Craig Slater	Colchester United	Partick Thistle	Free
5 July 2018	Scott Fraser	Dundee United	Burton Albion	Free
5 July 2018	David Templeton	Hamilton Academical	Burton Albion	Free
6 July 2018	Steven Naismith	Norwich City	Heart of Midlothian	Loan
6 July 2018	Stevie Mallan	Barnsley	Hibernian	Undisclosed
6 July 2018	Seb Ross	Aberdeen	Stenhousemuir	Loan
6 July 2018	Ally Roy	Heart of Midlothian	Derry City	Free
6 July 2018	Aaron Splaine	Dunfermline Athletic	Derry City	Free
7 July 2018	Collin Seedorf	Inverness Caledonian Thistle	FC Eindhoven	Free
7 July 2018	Ronan Kearney	Alloa Athletic	Albion Rovers	Free
7 July 2018	Steven Smith	Alloa Athletic	Albion Rovers	Free
7 July 2018	Dylan Monaghan	Alloa Athletic	Albion Rovers	Free
7 July 2018	Christopher Wylie	Alloa Athletic	Albion Rovers	Free
7 July 2018	Jake Hastie	Motherwell	Alloa Athletic	Loan
9 July 2018	Tony Watt	OH Leuven	St Johnstone	Free
9 July 2018	Hayden Coulson	Middlesbrough	St Mirren	Loan
9 July 2018	Kyle Johnson	Ross County	Stenhousemuir	Free
10 July 2018	Ali Crawford	Hamilton Academical	Doncaster Rovers	Free
10 July 2018	Lassana Coulibaly	Angers	Rangers	Loan
10 July 2018	Umar Sadiq	Roma	Rangers	Loan
10 July 2018	Neil McLaughlin	Partick Thistle	Motherwell	Free
10 July 2018	Neil McLaughlin	Motherwell	Stirling Albion	Loan
10 July 2018	Dylan Mackin	Livingston	Falkirk	Undisclosed
11 July 2018	Danny Rogers	Aberdeen	St Mirren	Loan
11 July 2018	Bruno Alves	Rangers	Parma	Free
11 July 2018	Ross M. Stewart	St Mirren	Livingston	Undisclosed
11 July 2018	Kevin Nisbet	Partick Thistle	Raith Rovers	Free
11 July 2018	Nathan Flanagan	St Mirren	Raith Rovers	Free
12 July 2018	Kostadin Gadzhalov	Dundee	Botev Vratsa	Free
12 July 2018	Liam Dick	Dumbarton	Alloa Athletic	Free
12 July 2018	Chris Henry	St. Mirren	Alloa Athletic	Free
12 July 2018	Zdravko Karadachki	Edinburgh City	Alloa Athletic	Free
12 July 2018	Andy Murdoch	Greenock Morton	Ayr United	Free
12 July 2018	Ross Doohan	Celtic	Ayr United	Loan
12 July 2018	Jamie McGowan	Greenock Morton	Dumbarton	Free
12 July 2018	Faissal El Bakhtaoui	Dundee	Dunfermline Athletic	Loan
13 July 2018	Myles Hippolyte	St Mirren	Dunfermline Athletic	Free
13 July 2018	Cole Kpekawa	Colchester United	St Mirren	Free
13 July 2018	Ross Millen	Queen's Park	Kilmarnock	Free
13 July 2018	Michael Paton	Dunfermline Athletic	Dumbarton	Free
13 July 2018	Adam Phillips	Norwich City	Hamilton Academical	Loan
13 July 2018	Dean Watson	Carlisle United	Queen of the South	Free
13 July 2018	Callum Semple	Sheffield United	Queen of the South	Loan
13 July 2018	Michael Doyle	Greenock Morton	Queen of the South	Free
14 July 2018	Adam Barton	Partick Thistle	Dundee United	Free
15 July 2018	Conor Sammon	Heart of Midlothian	Motherwell	Loan
15 July 2018	Eduardo Herrera	Rangers	Santos Laguna	Loan
16 July 2018	Lewis Toshney	Dundee United	Arbroath	Loan
16 July 2018	Sean Welsh	Falkirk	Inverness Caledonian Thistle	Free
17 July 2018	Jon Aurtenetxe	Dundee	Amorebieta	Free
17 July 2018	Reghan Tumilty	Ross County	Greenock Morton	Free
18 July 2018	Dominic Ball	Rotherham United	Aberdeen	Loan
18 July 2018	Kevin Silva	Rutgers Scarlet Knights	Heart of Midlothian	Free
19 July 2018	Harry Forrester	Rangers	Tractor Sazi	Free
19 July 2018	Adam Rooney	Aberdeen	Salford City	Undisclosed
19 July 2018	Colin Doyle	Bradford City	Heart of Midlothian	Free
20 July 2018	Paul Watson	Falkirk	Dundee United	Free
20 July 2018	Egli Kaja	AFC Wimbledon	Livingston	Loan
20 July 2018	Joe Cardle	Dunfermline Athletic	AFC Fylde	Free
21 July 2018	Ross Fergusson	Queen of the South	Annan Athletic	Free
21 July 2018	Matty Kennedy	Cardiff City	St Johnstone	Free
22 July 2018	Ryan Kent	Liverpool	Rangers	Loan
23 July 2018	Garry Fleming	Alloa Athletic	Kilwinning Rangers	Free
23 July 2018	Simon Murray	Hibernian	Bidvest Wits	Undisclosed
23 July 2018	Rees Greenwood	Gateshead	Falkirk	Free
25 July 2018	Tomas Cerny	Partick Thistle	Aberdeen	Free
25 July 2018	Tommie Hoban	Watford	Aberdeen	Loan
25 July 2018	Yannick Loemba	Adana Demirspor	Dundee United	Free
26 July 2018	Max Melbourne	West Bromwich Albion	Partick Thistle	Loan
26 July 2018	Conor Mitchell	Burnley	St Johnstone	Loan
26 July 2018	Connor Bell	Inverness Caledonian Thistle	Greenock Morton	Free
27 July 2018	Matty Willock	Manchester United	St. Mirren	Loan
27 July 2018	Marcus Haber	Dundee	Falkirk	Loan
29 July 2018	Tom Bradbury	Banbury United	Dundee	Free
31 July 2018	Fabio Cardoso	Rangers	Santa Clara	Free
1 August 2018	Rory Currie	Heart of Midlothian	East Fife	Loan
1 August 2018	Andy Irving	Heart of Midlothian	Falkirk	Loan
1 August 2018	Lewis Moore	Heart of Midlothian	Forfar Athletic	Loan
1 August 2018	Euan Henderson	Heart of Midlothian	Montrose	Loan
2 August 2018	Adil Nabi	Peterborough United	Dundee	Free
2 August 2018	Brian Graham	Cheltenham Town	Ross County	Free
2 August 2018	James Brown	Millwall	Livingston	Loan
2 August 2018	Steven Lawless	Partick Thistle	Livingston	Free
2 August 2018	Kyle Thomson	Loyola Ramblers	Greenock Morton	Free
3 August 2018	Tim Chow	Ross County	Spartak Subotica	Free
3 August 2018	Jamie Maclaren	Darmstadt 98	Hibernian	Loan
3 August 2018	Cédric Kipré	Motherwell	Wigan Athletic	£1,000,000
3 August 2018	Rory McKeown	Warrington Town	Greenock Morton	Free
3 August 2018	Aidan Wilson	Rangers	Forfar Athletic	Loan
3 August 2018	Kieran Wright	Rangers	Raith Rovers	Loan
3 August 2018	Chris Antoniazzi	Aberdeen	Montrose	Loan
6 August 2018	Gordon Greer	Kilmarnock	Retired	Free
6 August 2018	Delphin Tshiembe	Horsens	Hamilton Academical	Free
6 August 2018	Jacob Marsden	Mildenhall Town	Hamilton Academical	Free
7 August 2018	Borna Barisic	Osijek	Rangers	£2,200,000
7 August 2018	Mark Russell	Greenock Morton	Falkirk	Free
8 August 2018	Thomas Agyepong	Manchester City	Hibernian	Loan
8 August 2018	Greg Docherty	Rangers	Shrewsbury Town	Loan
8 August 2018	Daniel Bachmann	Watford	Kilmarnock	Loan
8 August 2018	Emerson Hyndman	Bournemouth	Hibernian	Loan
8 August 2018	John McGinn	Hibernian	Aston Villa	£2,750,000
9 August 2018	Nicolai Brock-Madsen	Birmingham City	St Mirren	Loan
9 August 2018	Declan John	Rangers	Swansea City	Undisclosed
9 August 2018	Josh Windass	Rangers	Wigan Athletic	Undisclosed
9 August 2018	Tom Aldred	Bury	Motherwell	Loan
9 August 2018	Pavol Safranko	Aalborg	Dundee United	Loan
10 August 2018	Scott Tiffoney	Greenock Morton	Livingston	Undisclosed
10 August 2018	Scott Tiffoney	Livingston	Greenock Morton	Loan
10 August 2018	David Ngog	Ross County	Budapest Honvéd	Free
10 August 2018	Christian Mbulu	Millwall	Motherwell	Free
10 August 2018	Emilio Izaguirre	Al-Fayha	Celtic	Free
11 August 2018	Daryl Horgan	Preston North End	Hibernian	Undisclosed
12 August 2018	Andrea Mbuyi-Mutombo	RNK Split	Partick Thistle	Free
13 August 2018	James Wilson	Manchester United	Aberdeen	Loan
13 August 2018	Lee Erwin	Kilmarnock	Tractor Sazi	Free
13 August 2018	Don Cowie	Heart of Midlothian	Ross County	Free
14 August 2018	Alex Samizadeh	Kilmarnock	Curzon Ashton	Free
14 August 2018	Liam Smith	Heart of Midlothian	Ayr United	Free
15 August 2018	Alfie Jones	Southampton	St Mirren	Loan
15 August 2018	Jamie Barjonas	Rangers	Bury	Loan
16 August 2018	Dario Zanatta	Heart of Midlothian	Alloa Athletic	Loan
16 August 2018	Scott Shepherd	Falkirk	Edinburgh City	Free
17 August 2018	Abdul Osman	Partick Thistle	Lamia	Free
17 August 2018	Daniel Arzani	Manchester City	Celtic	Loan
17 August 2018	Benjamin Kallman	Inter Turku	Dundee	Loan
18 August 2018	Mark Milligan	Al-Ahli	Hibernian	Free
20 August 2018	Lee Hodson	Rangers	St Mirren	Loan
21 August 2018	Jimmy Dunne	Burnley	Heart of Midlothian	Loan
21 August 2018	Souleymane Coulibaly	Al Ahly	Partick Thistle	Free
22 August 2018	Brice Ntambwe	Lierse	Partick Thistle	Free
22 August 2018	Steve Lawson	Neuchâtel Xamax	Livingston	Free
22 August 2018	Kyle Lafferty	Heart of Midlothian	Rangers	Undisclosed
23 August 2018	Liam Burt	Rangers	Alloa Athletic	Loan
23 August 2018	Callum Smith	Dunfermline Athletic	Arbroath	Loan
23 August 2018	Greg Morrison	Ross County	Elgin City	Loan
24 August 2018	Darren Lyon	Hamilton Academical	Peterborough United	Free
24 August 2018	Ross Jenkins	Hamilton Academical	Free agent	Free
25 August 2018	Kieran Monlouis	St Albans City	Hamilton Academical	Free
27 August 2018	Dolly Menga	Blackpool	Livingston	Free
28 August 2018	Greg Stewart	Birmingham City	Kilmarnock	Loan
28 August 2018	Demetri Mitchell	Manchester United	Heart of Midlothian	Loan
28 August 2018	Bobby Burns	Heart of Midlothian	Livingston	Loan
28 August 2018	Tristan Nydam	Ipswich Town	St Johnstone	Loan
29 August 2018	Kenny Miller	Livingston	Dundee	Free
29 August 2018	Aaron Tshibola	Aston Villa	Kilmarnock	Loan
30 August 2018	Max Lowe	Derby County	Aberdeen	Loan
30 August 2018	Jak Alnwick	Rangers	Scunthorpe United	Loan
30 August 2018	Craig Wighton	Dundee	Heart of Midlothian	Undisclosed
30 August 2018	Sam Roscoe	Aberdeen	Alloa Athletic	Loan
30 August 2018	Callum Hendry	St Johnstone	Brechin City	Loan
31 August 2018	Ross Callachan	Heart of Midlothian	St Johnstone	Free
31 August 2018	Youssouf Mulumbu	Kilmarnock	Celtic	Free
31 August 2018	Filip Benkovic	Leicester City	Celtic	Loan
31 August 2018	Jack Aitchison	Celtic	Dumbarton	Loan
31 August 2018	Ryan Edwards	Heart of Midlothian	St Mirren	Loan
31 August 2018	Joe Worrall	Nottingham Forest	Rangers	Loan
31 August 2018	Eros Grezda	Osijek	Rangers	Undisclosed
31 August 2018	Bright Enobakhare	Wolverhampton Wanderers	Kilmarnock	Loan
31 August 2018	Adam Frizzell	Kilmarnock	Queen of the South	Loan
31 August 2018	Jack Byrne	Oldham Athletic	Kilmarnock	Free
31 August 2018	Aidan Keena	Heart of Midlothian	Dunfermline Athletic	Loan
31 August 2018	Malaury Martin	Heart of Midlothian	Dunfermline Athletic	Loan
31 August 2018	Robbie Muirhead	Milton Keynes Dons	Dunfermline Athletic	Undisclosed
31 August 2018	Scott Martin	Hibernian	Hamilton Academical	Free
31 August 2018	Fredrik Brustad	Molde	Hamilton Academical	Loan
31 August 2018	James Keatings	Dundee United	Hamilton Academical	Undisclosed
31 August 2018	Matt Kilgallon	Bradford City	Hamilton Academical	Free
31 August 2018	Jai Quitongo	Greenock Morton	Partick Thistle	Compensation
31 August 2018	Calvin Miller	Celtic	Dundee	Loan
31 August 2018	Andy Boyle	Preston North End	Dundee	Loan
31 August 2018	Ryan Inniss	Crystal Palace	Dundee	Loan
31 August 2018	Jordan McGregor	Airdrieonians	Aberdeen	Free
31 August 2018	Moussa Dembélé	Celtic	Lyon	£19,700,000

== See also ==
- List of Scottish football transfers winter 2017–18
- List of Scottish football transfers winter 2018–19
