= 2019–20 Dundee F.C. season =

Dundee
2019–20 season
- Chairman: Tim Keyes
- Manager: James McPake
- Stadium: Dens Park
- Scottish Championship: 3rd place
- League Cup: Second round
- Scottish Cup: Fourth round
- Challenge Cup: Third round
- Top goalscorer: League: Kane Hemmings (10); All: Kane Hemmings (10)
- Highest home attendance: 11,233 vs Dundee United, 8 November 2019 (Cham.)
- Lowest home attendance: 1,619 vs Elgin City, 8 September 2019 (CC)
- Average home league attendance: 5,277
Home colours	Away colours	Third colours

The 2019–20 season was Dundee's first season back in the second flight of Scottish football since their relegation at the end of the 2018–19 season. Dundee also competed in the League Cup, the Scottish Cup and the Challenge Cup.

On 13 March 2020 the Scottish football season was suspended with immediate effect due to the COVID-19 pandemic. On 15 April a resolution by the SPFL passed, cancelling the Championship season early and cancelling the play-offs.

== Season summary ==
=== Pre-season ===
Dundee hired former U18s and reserve manager James McPake as manager for the 2019–20 season, and also hired former Raith Rovers manager and current Northern Ireland national team assistant manager Jimmy Nicholl as assistant manager. On 18 July, it was announced that Gordon Strachan would become Technical Director of the club, with a large focus of his role being in the development of the club's Youth Academy.

=== July ===
Their opening competitive games in the League Cup gave reason both for optimism and concern. Coming out of their first match away to Raith Rovers, Dundee left with an impressive 0–3 victory behind them. However, this strong win was followed by two consecutive frustrating goalless draws against lower league opposition, though both results were masked somewhat through the Dees winning both penalty shootouts to gain extra points in both matches. Dundee closed out their League Cup group campaign with a 1–0 home win over fellow Championship side Inverness CT, cementing the side as group winners.

=== August ===
The league campaign got underway away to Dunfermline. After a dismal first half display where the Pars went up by 2 and were unlucky to not score more, Dundee came out with a draw after Danny Johnson netted two penalties and the side improved in the second half to leave with a point. Dundee followed up with a more impressive showing at Dens, defeating Ayr United 1–0 via an Andrew Nelson header. In their League Cup second round match, Dundee would provide tough opposition to Premiership side Aberdeen and would lead for the majority for the game, before the Dons netted a late equaliser and then a winner in extra time. Upon returning to league action, Dundee would play out a 0–0 draw at home against Inverness, before taking on rivals Dundee United in the first Dundee derby in 2 years, and the first league derby since the Dees relegated their rivals from the Premiership three years prior. In front of over 14,000 fans at Tannadice, a bizarre and controversial game swung the way of the Terrors, who ran out 6–2 winners in what was a rough night for the Dark Blues.

=== September ===
Any hope of a quick bounce-back after the derby humiliation was lost when Dundee once again underperformed against lower league opposition and went out in embarrassing fashion at home to Elgin City in the Challenge Cup. In their return to league action, Dundee mustered an important 2–1 home win against Alloa to end their winless run, but could not keep the momentum up and lost their next game on the road to Morton. The away struggles continued for the Dee, as they had to settle for a point against Queen of the South the following week.

=== October ===
Upon their return to Dens, Dundee had a more confident and encouraging showing against Arbroath, running out 2–0 winners with relative comfort. The struggle to maintain a positive streak continued however, as a late collapse led to a defeat to Partick Thistle. Under pressure to improve performance in a tight league, the Dee would win their first away league game of the season in a hard-fought contest against Ayr United, and followed that up with their first consecutive league wins since May 2018 with a comfortable 0–3 away to Alloa.

=== November ===
Dundee's positive momentum continued with their third consecutive victory, in a home game against Morton. This was the first time in exactly 5 years since Dundee last won three league games in a row, as well as the first team they defeated not starting with 'A' in the league. This positive momentum did not carry into the Dundee derby, as Dundee United battled their way to another victory over their rivals in a sold out Dens Park. After a two-week break, Dundee turned in another unimpressive display, losing away to Inverness. The Dark Blues' woes continued the following week, and despite scoring a late equaliser, they immediately gave away a losing goal to Queen of the South.

=== December ===
Dundee managed to take a point from Arbroath at Gayfield Park to end their three-game losing streak. Desperate for an end to their winless run, Dundee put on a terrific first-half performance against on-form Dunfermline, making it 4–1 just after the second half began. Despite playing against 10 men for the majority of the second half, Dundee once again collapsed defensively, letting their opponents claw back. The Dee however managed to hang on and survive with a 4–3 victory. The positive momentum continued with an away clean sheet win against Partick Thistle. Dundee closed out the year with a very respectable performance and draw away to league leaders and rivals Dundee United, being the first team to take points off of them at Tannadice, and moved up to third place for the new year.

=== January ===
Despite having a great opportunity to gain further ground in the league in a home game against 2nd-placed Inverness CT, Dundee once again capitulated in a big game, losing 0–2 in a poor performance. After their game against Ayr United was called off due to a waterlogged pitch, Dundee played their next game against Motherwell in the Scottish Cup. The Dark Blues yet again fell at the first hurdle in the cup and were soundly beaten by their Premiership counterparts. The following week only continued the dismal play, as Dundee were completely dominated once again and failed to score for the third consecutive game in a 2–0 loss to Dunfermline that would have been far worse if not from some good saves by keeper Jack Hamilton.

=== February ===
After bringing in new faces in January, Dundee headed to Cappielow to face Morton. Despite taking an early lead and Morton going down to 10 men, Dundee again couldn't capitalise and could only take home a point, that along with other results dropped them down to 6th place. Dundee finally found some positive form the following week, with a comfortable 2–0 win at home against bottom side Partick Thistle, with Kane Hemmings scoring a brace. Dundee were able to continue their positive swing in momentum with their first win at Palmerston Park in just over 6 years and a second consecutive clean sheet, with Jordon Forster's strike providing Dundee the win and pulling them equal on points with 2nd-placed Inverness CT. The weather however proved too big of a match-up the following week for Dens, leading to Dundee's game with Arbroath to be postponed.

=== March ===
Despite another impressive performance at home to Alloa which saw Dundee's third consecutive clean sheet, missed chances led to a goalless draw. Dundee would extend their run to four straight clean sheets with help from a Conor Hazard penalty save, but yet again would not find the net themselves in another 0–0 draw away to Ayr United. In the reverse fixture 3 days later, the Dark Blues made their chances count, combining a fifth straight clean sheet with 2 goals to again best their play-off rivals.

==== Season suspension due to COVID-19 and voting controversy ====
Unfortunately, Dundee's season and Scottish football's season as a whole were brought to a screeching halt on 13 March, when it was announced by the SPFL that due to the global coronavirus pandemic, all future games for the season would be postponed indefinitely. The initial suspension for all Scottish football was to last until 30 April, until a further update on 9 April postponed all games until 10 June at the earliest. On 8 April the SPFL proposed a vote to end the 2019–20 SPFL season (excluding the Scottish Premiership due to complications with UEFA), with all 42 SPFL member clubs voting on behalf of their current league.

The vote was mired in controversy however, as it was revealed that one Championship club's vote, later discovered to be Dundee's, was one of only a few not received by the SPFL's requested deadline on 10 April. The SPFL released the received votes at 17:00, indicating that one more vote from a Championship club either for or against the proposal would decide the result, incidentally making Dundee's vote the deciding one. Despite initial outcry regarding meeting the requested deadline, league rules indicated Dundee had 28 days to give their vote. Prior to the vote, Dundee were expected to vote against the proposal, and earlier on the day of the vote had released a statement that, while not directly stating what they intended to vote, indicated displeasure with the proposal.

The day following the vote, Inverness CT chief executive and former Dundee CEO Scot Gardiner claimed that Dundee, Inverness and Partick Thistle had all been in agreement prior to the vote that all three clubs would all go against the proposal. Gardiner said all three clubs circulated their votes, and that Dundee supposedly sent their vote in before the 17:00 deadline on 10 April, and shared an image of a filled in voting slip signed by Dundee's Managing Director, John Nelms. When news spread that Dundee's vote had not yet been received by the SPFL, Dundee's club secretary Eric Drysdale informed the others that he had been instructed not to resubmit Dundee's vote, as it was now the casting vote and therefore held more power. The SPFL meanwhile claimed that it had not yet received a vote from Dundee. After a few days of uncertainty regarding the club's intentions, Dundee released a statement on 15 April which made clear their request for serious consideration for league reconstruction was required in order for the club to agree to the proposal. Later that day, the SPFL announced that the proposal had officially been accepted, indicating Dundee had in fact approved it, thus terminating their season effective immediately. Their statement also included a commitment to consult on potential league reconstruction via an expanded Premiership.

On 24 April, an SPFL-commissioned investigation concluded that there was 'no evidence of impropriety'.

== Competitions ==
Win Draw Loss Postponed

All times are in British Summer Time (BST).

=== Pre-season and friendlies ===
29 June 2019 Friendly	Brechin City (Scotland)	1–2	(Scotland) Dundee	Glebe Park, Brechin
13:00	Ngoy 58'	Report	McDaid 42'; Cameron 67'	Attendance: 1,025; Referee: Graham Beaton

2 July 2019 Friendly	Dundee (Scotland)	0–0	(England) Nottingham Forest	Pinatar Arena, San Pedro del Pinatar
17:30		Report

5 July 2019 Friendly	Scunthorpe United (England)	2–1	(Scotland) Dundee	La Manga Club Football Stadium, Spain
11:00	Olomola 11'; Lund 31'		McGowan 13'	Attendance: Behind closed doors

9 July 2019 Friendly	Dundee (Scotland)	1–0	(England) Blackpool	Dens Park, Dundee
19:45	Nelson 41'	Report		Attendance: 2,405

=== Scottish Championship ===
Dundee will play against Alloa Athletic, Arbroath, Ayr United, Dundee United, Dunfermline Athletic, Greenock Morton, Inverness Caledonian Thistle, Partick Thistle and Queen of the South in the 2019–20 Championship campaign, playing each team four times, twice at home and twice away.

2 August 2019 1	Dunfermline Athletic	2–2	Dundee	East End Park, Dunfermline
19:05	Dow 13'; Nisbet 35'	Report	Johnson 45' (pen.), 75' (pen.)	Attendance: 5,227; Referee: Greg Aitken

10 August 2019 2	Dundee	1–0	Ayr United	Dens Park, Dundee
15:00	Nelson 74'	Report		Attendance: 5,520; Referee: Alan Newlands

24 August 2019 3	Dundee	0–0	Inverness Caledonian Thistle	Dens Park, Dundee
15:00		Report		Attendance: 5,016; Referee: David Munro

30 August 2019 4	Dundee United	6–2	Dundee	Tannadice Park, Dundee
19:45	Butcher 14', 40'; Appéré 33'; Shankland 36' (pen.); Harkes 46'; C. Smith 83'	Report	Hemmings 22'; Nelson 70'	Attendance: 14,108; Referee: Kevin Clancy

14 September 2019 5	Dundee	2–1	Alloa Athletic	Dens Park, Dundee
15:00	Johnson 2'; McGhee 39'	Report	Dick 10'	Attendance: 4,453; Referee: Alan Newlands

21 September 2019 6	Greenock Morton	1–0	Dundee	Cappielow, Greenock
15:00	Grant 45+1'	Report		Attendance: 1,901; Referee: John McKendrick

27 September 2019 7	Queen of the South	1–1	Dundee	Palmerston Park, Dumfries
19:05	Hamilton 6'	Report	McGhee 11'	Attendance: 1,249; Referee: Willie Collum

5 October 2019 8	Dundee	2–0	Arbroath	Dens Park, Dundee
15:00	McDaid 38', 59'	Report		Attendance: 5,045; Referee: Alan Newlands

19 October 2019 9	Dundee	1–3	Partick Thistle	Dens Park, Dundee
15:00	McGowan 25'	Report	Miller 85'; Gordon 88'; Mansell 90+1'	Attendance: 5,010; Referee: David Munro

25 October 2019 10	Ayr United	1–2	Dundee	Somerset Park, Ayr
19:05	McCowan 38'	Report	McDaid 16'; McGowan 32'	Attendance: 1,627; Referee: Bobby Madden

29 October 2019 11	Alloa Athletic	0–3	Dundee	Recreation Park, Alloa
19:45		Report	Hemmings 15', 39'; Mackie 75'	Attendance: 1,218; Referee: Barry Cook

1 November 2019 12	Dundee	2–1	Greenock Morton	Dens Park, Dundee
19:05	Hemmings 63'; Ness 80'	Report	Salkeld 64'	Attendance: 4,228; Referee: Greg Aitken

8 November 2019 13	Dundee	0–2	Dundee United	Dens Park, Dundee
19:45		Report	Clark 56' (pen.); Shankland 64'	Attendance: 11,233; Referee: Steven McLean

23 November 2019 14	Inverness Caledonian Thistle	1–0	Dundee	Caledonian Stadium, Inverness
15:00	Doran 16'	Report		Attendance: 2,184; Referee: David Munro

30 November 2019 15	Dundee	1–2	Queen of the South	Dens Park, Dundee
15:00	Johnson 90+2'	Report	Dobbie 29', 90+3'	Attendance: 4,517; Referee: Alan Muir

7 December 2019 16	Arbroath	1–1	Dundee	Gayfield Park, Arbroath
15:00	Linn 37'	Report	Hemmings 61'	Attendance: 2,170; Referee: Alan Newlands

14 December 2019 17	Dundee	4–3	Dunfermline Athletic	Dens Park, Dundee
15:00	Devine 15' (o.g.); Hemmings 25'; McGowan 34'; Johnson 46'	Report	Dow 16'; Kiltie (red card) 62'; Nisbet 69'; Martin 72'	Attendance: 4,699; Referee: Kevin Clancy

21 December 2019 18	Partick Thistle	0–1	Dundee	Firhill Stadium, Glasgow
15:00		Report	McGowan 31'	Attendance: 2,957; Referee: Bobby Madden

27 December 2019 19	Dundee United	1–1	Dundee	Tannadice Park. Dundee
19:45	Clark 5'	Report	Dorrans 50'	Attendance: 14,007; Referee: Alan Muir

4 January 2020 20	Dundee	0–2	Inverness Caledonian Thistle	Dens Park, Dundee
15:00		Report	Doran 17'; Keatings 24'	Attendance: 5,040; Referee: Don Robertson

24 January 2020 21	Dunfermline Athletic	2–0	Dundee	East End Park, Dunfermline
19:05	Dow 28'; Nisbet 40'	Report		Attendance: 3,722; Referee: David Munro

1 February 2020 22	Greenock Morton	1–1	Dundee	Cappielow, Greenock
15:00	McAlister 26'; Jacobs (red card) 58'	Report	Hemmings 12'	Attendance: 1,643; Referee: Bobby Madden

8 February 2020 23*	Dundee	2–0	Partick Thistle	Dens Park, Dundee
15:00	Hemmings 23', 34'	Report		Attendance: 4,816; Referee: Colin Steven
Note: Rescheduled due to Partick's progress in the Challenge Cup. Original game date was 15 February.

22 February 2020 24	Queen of the South	0–1	Dundee	Palmerston Park, Dumfries
15:00		Report	Forster 72'	Attendance: 1,126; Referee: Don Robertson

3 March 2020 25	Dundee	0–0	Alloa Athletic	Dens Park, Dundee
19:45		Report		Attendance: 4,356; Referee: Mike Roncone

7 March 2020 26	Ayr United	0–0	Dundee	Somerset Park, Ayr
15:00		Report		Attendance: 1,758; Referee: Steven McLean

10 March 2020 27*	Dundee	2–0	Ayr United	Dens Park, Dundee
19:45	Hemmings 11'; Crankshaw 90+2'	Report		Attendance: 4,670; Referee: John Beaton
Note: Rescheduled due to a waterlogged pitch. Original game date was 11 January.

Season was prematurely ended due to the COVID-19 pandemic, leaving 9 games unplayed.

=== Scottish Cup ===
As a Premiership side the season prior, Dundee will enter the Scottish Cup in the Fourth Round.

18 January 2020 Fourth round	Dundee	0–3	Motherwell	Dens Park, Dundee
19:20		Report	Long 22', 30', 75'	Attendance: 2,407; Referee: Steven McLean

=== Scottish League Cup ===
Dundee will be top seeded in the draw for the Scottish League Cup group stage, and will face off against Inverness Caledonian Thistle, Raith Rovers, Peterhead and Cove Rangers in Group D of the tournament.

==== Group stage ====
13 July 2019 Group D	Raith Rovers	0–3	Dundee	Stark's Park, Kirkcaldy
15:00		Report	Nelson 14', 29' (pen.); Curran 75'	Attendance: 2,584; Referee: Lloyd Wilson

17 July 2019 Group D	Cove Rangers	0–0 (2–3 p)	Dundee	Balmoral Stadium, Aberdeen
19:45		Report		Attendance: 1,410; Referee: Scott Lambie
	Penalties
	Scott (penalty scored); Masson (penalty missed); H. Milne (penalty missed); Park (penalty scored); Higgins (penalty missed)		McGhee (penalty scored); Forster (penalty missed); Nelson (penalty missed); McDaid (penalty scored); McGowan (penalty scored)

20 July 2019 Group D	Dundee	0–0 (4–2 p)	Peterhead	Dens Park, Dundee
15:00		Report		Attendance: 2,322; Referee: Greg Aitken
	Penalties
	McDaid (penalty missed); Curran (penalty scored); Cunningham (penalty scored); Nelson (penalty scored); McGowan (penalty scored)		Gibson (penalty scored); Leitch (penalty missed); Smith (penalty scored); Stevenson (penalty missed)

28 July 2019 Group D	Dundee	1–0	Inverness Caledonian Thistle	Dens Park, Dundee
15:00	Johnson 33'	Report		Attendance: 2,066; Referee: Nick Walsh

==== Knockout stage ====
18 August 2019 Second round	Dundee	1–2 (a.e.t.)	Aberdeen	Dens Park, Dundee
15:00	Johnson 43' (pen.)	Report	Considine 90+1'; Cosgrove 103'	Attendance: 5,740; Referee: Willie Collum

=== Scottish Challenge Cup ===
Dundee will enter the Scottish Challenge Cup in the Third Round.

8 September 2019 Third round	Dundee	1–2	Elgin City	Dens Park, Dundee
15:00	Kerr 18'; Ferrie (red card) 59'	Report	Omar 56'; Sutherland 58'	Attendance: 1,619; Referee: Grant Irvine

== Team statistics ==
=== League table ===
Pos	Team	Pld	W	D	L	GF	GA	GD	Pts	PPG	Promotion, qualification or relegation (Note: All play-off matches were cancelled, as clubs voted to curtail the season due to the COVID-19 pandemic in Scotland.)
1	Dundee United (C, P)	28	18	5	5	52	22	+30	59	2.11	Promotion to the Premiership
2	Inverness Caledonian Thistle	27	14	3	10	39	32	+7	45	1.67	
3	Dundee	27	11	8	8	32	31	+1	41	1.52	
4	Ayr United	27	12	4	11	38	35	+3	40	1.48	
5	Arbroath	26	10	6	10	24	26	−2	36	1.38	

Source: SPFL
Rules for classification: 1) Points per game.
(C) Champions; (P) Promoted

=== Results by round ===
Round	1	2	3	4	5	6	7	8	9	10	11	12	13	14	15	16	17	18	19	20	21	22	23	24	25	26	27
Ground	A	H	H	A	H	A	A	H	H	A	A	H	H	A	H	A	H	A	A	H	A	A	H	A	H	A	H
Result	D	W	D	L	W	L	D	W	L	W	W	W	L	L	L	D	W	W	D	L	L	D	W	W	D	D	W
Position	3	2	4	6	5	6	4	4	5	4	4	3	3	4	4	5	5	4	3	4	4	6	4	3	4	4	3

Source: See results
A = Away; H = Home; W = Win; D = Draw; L = Loss

=== League Cup table ===
Pos	Team	Pld	W	PW	PL	L	GF	GA	GD	Pts	Qualification	DND	ICT	PET	COV	RAI
1	Dundee	4	2	2	0	0	4	0	+4	10	Qualification for the Second Round	—	1–0	p0–0	—	—
2	Inverness CT	4	2	0	1	1	7	4	+3	7		—	—	—	3–2	4–1
3	Peterhead	4	1	1	1	1	3	4	−1	6		—	p0–0	—	2–1	—
4	Cove Rangers	4	1	0	1	2	6	5	+1	4		0–0p	—	—	—	3–0
5	Raith Rovers	4	1	0	0	3	4	11	−7	3		0–3	—	3–1	—	—

Rules for classification: 1) goal difference, 2) goals scored, 3) away goals scored, 4) matches won, 5) away matches won, 6) drawing of lots.

== Squad statistics ==
As of May 30, 2020 (UTC)

No.	Pos	Nat	Player	Total		Championship		Scottish Cup		League Cup		Challenge Cup	
No.	Pos	Nat	Player	Apps	Goals	Apps	Goals	Apps	Goals	Apps	Goals	Apps	Goals
1	GK	(Scotland) SCO	Jack Hamilton	22	0	16	0	1	0	5	0	0	0
2	DF	(Scotland) SCO	Cammy Kerr	29	1	20+2	0	1	0	5	0	1	1
3	DF	(Scotland) SCO	Jordan McGhee	30	2	24	2	1	0	4	0	1	0
4	MF	(Scotland) SCO	Jamie Ness	13	1	4+4	1	1	0	3	0	1	0
5	DF	(Scotland) SCO	Jordon Forster	27	1	23	1	0	0	4	0	0	0
6	DF	(England) ENG	Josh Meekings	21	0	13+2	0	1	0	3+1	0	1	0
7	DF	(Scotland) SCO	Christophe Berra	6	0	6	0	0	0	0	0	0	0
8	MF	(Scotland) SCO	Shaun Byrne	29	0	19+3	0	1	0	5	0	1	0
9	FW	(England) ENG	Andrew Nelson	25	4	9+10	2	0	0	4+1	2	0+1	0
10	MF	(Scotland) SCO	Paul McGowan	31	4	22+2	4	1	0	4+1	0	1	0
11	MF	(Scotland) SCO	Declan McDaid	31	3	23+1	3	1	0	3+2	0	1	0
14	MF	(Scotland) SCO	Graham Dorrans	23	1	21+1	1	1	0	0	0	0	0
15	DF	(Republic of Ireland) IRL	Tom Field	1	0	0+1	0	0	0	0	0	0	0
16	DF	(England) ENG	Christie Elliott	6	0	4+2	0	0	0	0	0	0	0
17	MF	(England) ENG	Ollie Crankshaw	6	1	1+5	1	0	0	0	0	0	0
19	MF	(Scotland) SCO	Finlay Robertson	21	0	11+5	0	0	0	4+1	0	0	0
20	MF	(Scotland) SCO	Ross Callachan	4	0	3	0	0+1	0	0	0	0	0
23	DF	(England) ENG	Jordan Marshall	23	0	17	0	1	0	5	0	0	0
24	MF	(Scotland) SCO	Max Anderson	1	0	0	0	0	0	0	0	0+1	0
25	MF	(Scotland) SCO	Lyall Cameron	3	0	1	0	0+1	0	0+1	0	0	0
28	FW	(England) ENG	Kane Hemmings	27	10	23+2	10	1	0	0	0	1	0
30	GK	(Scotland) SCO	Harrison Sharp	1	0	0	0	0	0	0	0	0+1	0
36	GK	(Northern Ireland) NIR	Conor Hazard	11	0	11	0	0	0	0	0	0	0
40	DF	(Scotland) SCO	Grant Rodger	0	0	0	0	0	0	0	0	0	0
Players away from the club on loan:
12	GK	(England) ENG	Calum Ferrie	1	0	0	0	0	0	0	0	1	0
22	MF	(Scotland) SCO	Callum Moore	2	0	0+1	0	0	0	0+1	0	0	0
26	MF	(Scotland) SCO	Josh Mulligan	3	0	0	0	0	0	1+2	0	0	0
27	MF	(Scotland) SCO	Luke Strachan	0	0	0	0	0	0	0	0	0	0
29	DF	(Scotland) SCO	Sam Fisher	0	0	0	0	0	0	0	0	0	0
31	FW	(Scotland) SCO	Michael Cunningham	2	0	0+1	0	0	0	0+1	0	0	0
Players who left the club during the season:
7	MF	(England) ENG	Josh Todd	18	0	3+10	0	0	0	2+2	0	1	0
14	DF	(England) ENG	Andrew Davies	0	0	0	0	0	0	0	0	0	0
15	FW	(England) ENG	Craig Curran	3	1	0	0	0	0	1+2	1	0	0
17	MF	(Scotland) SCO	Josh McPake	7	0	3+4	0	0	0	0	0	0	0
18	FW	(England) ENG	Danny Johnson	22	7	11+8	5	0+1	0	2	2	0	0
21	DF	(Scotland) SCO	Sean Mackie	13	1	9+3	1	0	0	0	0	1	0

== Transfers ==
=== Summer ===
==== Players in ====
Date	Player	From	Fee
6 June 2019	(Scotland) Declan McDaid	(Scotland) Ayr United	Free
17 June 2019	(Scotland) Jordan McGhee	(Scotland) Falkirk	Free
18 June 2019	(England) Jordan Marshall	(Scotland) Queen of the South	Free
18 June 2019	(Scotland) Shaun Byrne	(Scotland) Livingston	Undisclosed
28 June 2019	(Scotland) Jamie Ness	(England) Plymouth Argyle	Free
29 June 2019	(Scotland) Jordon Forster	(England) Cheltenham Town	Free
26 July 2019	(England) Danny Johnson	(Scotland) Motherwell	Free
8 August 2019	(England) Kane Hemmings	(England) Notts County	Free
20 August 2019	(Scotland) Josh McPake	(Scotland) Rangers	Loan
2 September 2019	(Scotland) Sean Mackie	(Scotland) Hibernian	Loan

==== Players out ====
Date	Player	To	Fee
21 June 2019	(Australia) Jesse Curran	Free agent	Contract expired
26 June 2019	(Scotland) Kenny Miller	(Scotland) Partick Thistle	Free
17 July 2019	(Scotland) Kerr Waddell	(Scotland) Montrose	Contract expired
2 September 2019	(England) Andrew Davies	Free agent	Free
2 September 2019	(England) Craig Curran	Free agent	Free

=== Winter ===
==== Players in ====
Date	Player	From	Fee
20 September 2019	(Scotland) Graham Dorrans	(Scotland) Rangers	Free
24 October 2019	(Northern Ireland) Conor Hazard	(Scotland) Celtic	Emergency Loan
6 January 2020	(Scotland) Sam Fisher	(Scotland) East Kilbride	Return from loan
16 January 2020	(Scotland) Ross Callachan	(Scotland) St Johnstone	Loan
23 January 2020	(England) Ollie Crankshaw	(England) Wigan Athletic	Loan
27 January 2020	(Northern Ireland) Conor Hazard	(Scotland) Celtic	Loan
31 January 2020	(England) Christie Elliott	(England) Carlisle United	Free
31 January 2020	(Scotland) Christophe Berra	(Scotland) Heart of Midlothian	Loan
31 January 2020	(Republic of Ireland) Tom Field	(England) Brentford	Free

==== Players out ====
Date	Player	To	Fee
5 September 2019	(Scotland) Sam Fisher	(Scotland) East Kilbride	Loan
29 November 2019	(Northern Ireland) Conor Hazard	(Scotland) Celtic	End of loan
2 January 2020	(Scotland) Josh Mulligan	(Scotland) Cove Rangers	Loan
13 January 2020	(Scotland) Josh McPake	(Scotland) Rangers	End of loan
17 January 2020	(Scotland) Callum Moore	(Scotland) Stenhousemuir	Loan
17 January 2020	(England) Josh Todd	(Scotland) Falkirk	Free
22 January 2020	(Scotland) Sean Mackie	(Scotland) Hibernian	End of loan
27 January 2020	(England) Danny Johnson	(England) Leyton Orient	Undisclosed
31 January 2020	(England) Calum Ferrie	(Scotland) Falkirk	Loan
31 January 2020	(Scotland) Michael Cunningham	(Scotland) Cumbernauld Colts	Loan
29 February 2020	(Scotland) Luke Strachan	(Scotland) Brechin City	Loan

=== End of season ===
==== Players in ====
Date	Player	From	Fee
30 April 2020	(England) Calum Ferrie	(Scotland) Falkirk	Return from loan
31 May 2020	(Scotland) Josh Mulligan	(Scotland) Cove Rangers	Return from loan
31 May 2020	(Scotland) Callum Moore	(Scotland) Stenhousemuir	Return from loan
31 May 2020	(Scotland) Michael Cunningham	(Scotland) Cumbernauld Colts	Return from loan
31 May 2020	(Scotland) Luke Strachan	(Scotland) Brechin City	Return from loan

==== Players out ====
Date	Player	To	Fee
30 April 2020	(Scotland) Christophe Berra	(Scotland) Heart of Midlothian	End of loan
30 April 2020	(Scotland) Ross Callachan	(Scotland) St Johnstone	End of loan
30 April 2020	(Northern Ireland) Conor Hazard	(Scotland) Celtic	End of loan
31 May 2020	(England) Ollie Crankshaw	(England) Wigan Athletic	End of loan

== End of season awards ==
=== Club Player of the Year awards ===
- Andrew De Vries Player of the Year: Paul McGowan
- Isobel Sneddon Young Player of the Year: Finlay Robertson
- Players' Player of the Year: Jordan McGhee

== See also ==
- List of Dundee F.C. seasons
