= Andrew Nelson (footballer) =

English footballer (born 1997)

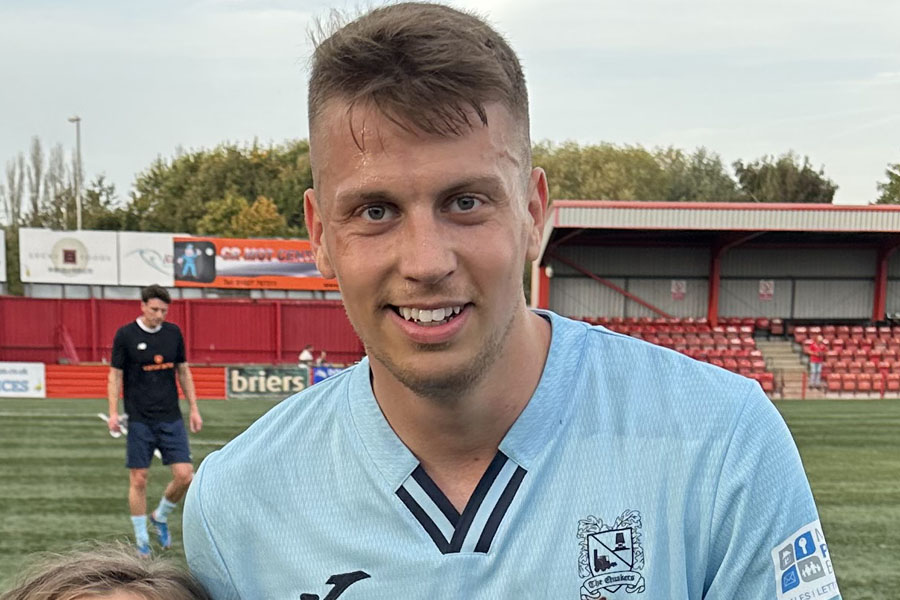
- Nelson in October 2023

Personal information
- Full name: Andrew George Robert Nelson
- Date of birth: 16 September 1997 (age 29)
- Place of birth: Stockton-on-Tees, England
- Position: Striker

Team information
- Current team: Newton Aycliffe

Youth career
- –2016: Sunderland

Senior career*
Years	Team	Apps	(Gls)
2016–2019	Sunderland	0	(0)
2017	→ Hartlepool United (loan)	4	(0)
2017	→ Harrogate Town (loan)	4	(1)
2018	→ Falkirk (loan)	12	(4)
2018–2019	→ Darlington (loan)	5	(6)
2019–2020	Dundee	31	(6)
2020–2021	Torquay United	0	(0)
2021–2022	Darlington	6	(1)
2023–2025	Darlington	67	(12)
2025–	Newton Aycliffe	24	(3)
- * Club domestic league appearances and goals as of 16:49, 24 May 2026 (UTC)

Andrew George Robert Nelson (born 16 September 1997) is an English professional footballer who plays as a striker.

He began his career with Sunderland, spending time on loan at Hartlepool United, for whom he made his Football League debut, Harrogate Town, Falkirk and Darlington. After 18 months with Dundee, he spent a season with Torquay United during which injury prevented him from playing at all, returned to Darlington in 2021 until injury again put a stop to his career, and rejoined the club in 2023 where he remained for just over two seasons.

== Early and personal life ==
Nelson was born in Stockton-on-Tees, County Durham, and attended King James I Academy in Bishop Auckland.

== Career ==
=== Sunderland ===
He joined Sunderland's academy – in preference to those of Newcastle United and Middlesbrough – at the age of seven and took up a two-year scholarship with the club in July 2014. In 2016, he signed a two-year professional contract which was later extended for a further year.

Nelson made two substitute appearances for Sunderland's U23 team in the 2016–17 EFL Trophy, a competition involving senior teams from third- and fourth-tier clubs together with under-age teams from the higher divisions. He moved on loan to Hartlepool United on 31 January 2017, and made his club and Football League debut in the starting eleven at home to Yeovil Town four days later. He made the cross from which Hartlepool opened the scoring, and then conceded the penalty from which Yeovil secured a 1–1 draw. He kept his starting place for the next two matches, without scoring, but in the next he injured his medial knee ligaments shortly after coming on as a substitute. He returned to his parent club for treatment and rehabilitation, and played no more football that season.

In October 2017, he joined Harrogate Town of the National League North on loan for a month. According to Harrogate manager Simon Weaver, during his debut Nelson "showed a good aggressive edge to his play, he was brave and his hold-up play was good." During his loan spell he played in four National League North matches and scored once, with a close-range header in a 3–1 defeat away to Spennymoor Town.

At the start of January 2018, Nelson moved on loan to Scottish Championship club Falkirk until the end of the season. He was a fixture in the starting eleven, scoring four goals and making three assists in twelve Championship appearances, until his loan spell was cut short by injury. A fractured cheekbone forced him to miss the last month of the season.

After surgery in September on a foot injured in pre-season, Nelson eventually resumed training in November 2018. In order to regain match fitness, he signed on a month's loan for another National League North club, Darlington, in December 2018. He scored twice on debut away to Chorley, albeit in a losing cause, and finished his loan spell with six goals from five league appearances. Darlington's manager Tommy Wright praised Nelson, saying that it "[doesn't] get much better than what he did with us – six goals and two assists".

=== Dundee ===
Nelson signed a two-and-a-half-year contract with Scottish Premiership club Dundee in January 2019; the fee was undisclosed. He scored a game-winning goal on his league debut, away to Heart of Midlothian on 23 January. Dundee entered a long losing streak and were relegated to the Championship on 4 May 2019.

The 2019–20 season was prematurely ended due to the COVID-19 pandemic.

In July 2020, Nelson left Dundee by mutual agreement.

=== Torquay United ===
Later that month he signed for Torquay United. He injured a knee in a pre-season friendly, eventually had surgery once the exact problem had been established, missed the entire season, and was released at its end.

=== Darlington ===
Nelson trained with Darlington ahead of the 2021–22 season, and – still not completely fit – rejoined the club on 11 August 2021. After nearly 18 months out of competitive football, he made his debut on 30 August, and scored his first goal two weeks later to secure Darlington's first point of the season with the equaliser away to Blyth Spartans. He made eight appearances before the knee problem recurred, and eventually decided to have surgery that would keep him out of the game for 15 months. On 11 May 2022, Darlington announced that Nelson had been released by the club but would later be invited back for pre-season training to help with his rehabilitation from injury.

On 3 March 2023, ten months after his release, a fully fit Nelson again signed for Darlington. He made his third debut for the Quakers the following day as a substitute. The following week, against AFC Fylde, Nelson twice gave Darlington a lead but Fylde won the match. He finished the season with three goals from 12 appearances. On 24 May 2023, Nelson signed a new two-year contract with Darlington. Nelson managed a full season in his first year of the new deal, and after the second year Darlington confirmed that he would depart the club in the summer of 2025.

== Career statistics ==
As of end of 2025–26 season

Appearances and goals by club, season and competition
Club	Season	League			National cup (Note: Includes FA Cup, Scottish Cup)		League cup (Note: Includes EFL Cup, Scottish League Cup)		Other		Total	
Club	Season	Division	Apps	Goals	Apps	Goals	Apps	Goals	Apps	Goals	Apps	Goals
Sunderland U23/U21	2016–17	—			—		—		2 (Note: Appearance(s) in the EFL Trophy)	0	2	0
Sunderland U23/U21	2017–18	—			—		—		1	0	1	0
Sunderland U23/U21	Total		—		—		—		3	0	3	0
Sunderland	2016–17	Premier League	0	0	0	0	0	0	—		0	0
Sunderland	2017–18	Championship	0	0	—		0	0	—		0	0
Sunderland	2018–19	League One	0	0	0	0	0	0	0	0	0	0
Sunderland	Total		0	0	0	0	0	0	0	0	0	0
Hartlepool United (loan)	2016–17	League Two	4	0	—		—		—		4	0
Harrogate Town (loan)	2017–18	National League North	4	1	—		—		—		4	1
Falkirk (loan)	2017–18	Scottish Championship	12	4	3	0	—		—		15	4
Darlington (loan)	2018–19	National League North	5	6	—		—		—		5	6
Dundee	2018–19	Scottish Premiership	12	4	2	0	—		—		14	4
Dundee	2019–20	Scottish Championship	19	2	0	0	5	2	1 (Note: Appearance(s) in the Scottish Challenge Cup)	0	25	4
Dundee	Total		31	6	2	0	5	2	1	0	39	8
Torquay United	2020–21	National League	0	0	0	0	—		0	0	0	0
Darlington	2021–22	National League North	6	1	2	0	—		0	0	8	1
Darlington	2022–23	National League North	12	3	—		—		—		12	3
Darlington	2023–24	National League North	34	5	2	0	—		1 (Note: Appearance(s) in FA Trophy)	0	37	5
Darlington	2024–25	National League North	21	4	2	1	—		0	0	23	5
Darlington	Total		67	12	4	1	—		1	0	72	13
Newton Aycliffe	2025–26	NPL Division One East	24	3	0	0	—		3	2	27	5
Career total			153	33	11	1	5	2	8	2	177	38
