= 2015–16 Dundee F.C. season =

Dundee
2015–16 season
- Chairman: Bill Colvin
- Manager: Paul Hartley
- Ground: Dens Park
- Scottish Premiership: 8th
- Scottish League Cup: Second round, lost to Dunfermline
- Scottish Cup: Quarter-final, lost to Rangers
- Top goalscorer: League: Kane Hemmings (21); All: Kane Hemmings (25)
- Highest home attendance: 11,025 vs. Dundee United, 2 January 2016
- Lowest home attendance: 3,532 vs. Dumbarton, Scottish Cup, 23 February 2016
- Average home league attendance: 6,122
Home colours	Away colours	Third colours

The 2015–16 season was Dundee's second season in the Scottish Premiership, having been promoted from the Scottish Championship at the end of the 2013/14 season. Dundee also competed in the League Cup and the Scottish Cup.

== Results and fixtures ==
Win Draw Loss Postponed

=== Scottish Premiership ===
1 August 2015 Premiership	Kilmarnock	0–4	Dundee	Rugby Park
15:00		BBC Report	Stewart 34', 78'; Loy 45', 47'	Attendance: 5,207; Referee: Madden

8 August 2015 Premiership	Dundee	1–2	Heart of Midlothian	Dens Park
15:00	Hemmings 5'	BBC Report	Juanma 56' (pen.), 63'	Attendance: 8,222; Referee: Thomson

11 August 2015 Premiership	Dundee United	2–2	Dundee	Tannadice Park
19:45	Spittal 64', 67'	BBC Report	Stewart 81'; McPake 90+4'	Attendance: 11,835; Referee: Beaton

15 August 2015 Premiership	Dundee	2–1	St Johnstone	Dens Park
15:00	McPake 16'; Hemmings 39'	BBC Report	MacLean 54'	Attendance: 6,176; Referee: Clancy

22 August 2015 Premiership	Aberdeen	2–0	Dundee	Pittodrie Stadium
15:00	Rooney 66', 90+4'	BBC Report	Harkins (yellow card) 90+4' (red card)	Attendance: 13,621; Referee: Madden

29 August 2015 Premiership	Dundee	1–1	Inverness CT	Dens Park
15:00	Hemmings 90+1'	BBC Report	Raven 60'; Mbuyi-Mutombo (red card) 90+3'	Attendance: 4,767; Referee: Dallas

12 September 2015 Premiership	Partick Thistle	0–1	Dundee	Firhill Stadium
15:00		BBC Report	Stewart 77'	Attendance: 2,946; Referee: Collum

20 September 2015 Premiership	Celtic	6–0	Dundee	Celtic Park
	Rogic 14'; Griffiths 16'; Izaguirre 54', 61'; Brown 87'; Ciftci 87'	BBC Report		Attendance: 48,558; Referee: McLean

26 September 2015 Premiership	Dundee	3–3	Ross County	Dens Park
15:00	Stewart 20'; Loy 54' (pen.), 69'	BBC Report	Boyce 19'; McPake 37' (o.g.); Gardyne 43'; Davies (yellow card) 53' (yellow-red card)	Attendance: 5,128; Referee: Thomson

3 October 2015 Premiership	Dundee	2–1	Motherwell	Dens Park
15:00	Loy 58'; Holt 70'	BBC Report	Pearson 83'	Attendance: 5,152; Referee: Robertson

17 October 2015 Premiership	Hamilton Academical	1–1	Dundee	New Douglas Park
15:00	MacKinnon (red card) 61'; Imrie 87' (yellow card) 87'	Report	Etxabeguren (yellow card) 16'; Holt 47'; Harkins (yellow card) 82'	Attendance: 2,862; Referee: Collum

24 October 2015 Premiership	Dundee	1–2	Kilmarnock	Dens Park
15:00	Meggatt (yellow card) 8'; Holt (yellow card) 24'; Ross (yellow card) 50'; Stewart (yellow card) 57'; Healey 76'	Report	Magennis 9' (yellow card) 20'; Smith 48' (yellow card) 63'; Higginbotham (yellow card) 56'	Attendance: 4,970; Referee: Dallas

31 October 2015 Premiership	Inverness CT	1–1	Dundee	Caledonian Stadium
15:00	Raven (red card) 50'; Tansey 64' (pen.)	BBC Report	Loy 50' (pen.)	Attendance: 2,940; Referee: Colvin

7 November 2015 Premiership	Dundee	1–1	Partick Thistle	Dens Park
15:00	Hemmings 85'	BBC Report	Lindsay 5'	Attendance: 5,067; Referee: Collum

21 November 2015 Premiership	Heart of Midlothian	1–1	Dundee	Tynecastle Park
15:00	Djoum 24'	BBC Report	Loy 67'	Attendance: 16,736; Referee: Clancy

27 November 2015 Premiership	St Johnstone	1–1	Dundee	McDiarmid Park
15:00	Wotherspoon 13'	BBC Report	Hemmings 3'	Attendance: 4,598; Referee: Muir

5 December 2015 Premiership	Dundee	0–2	Aberdeen	Dens Park
12:30	McGinn (yellow card) 47'	Report	McGinn 9'; Rooney 25'; Logan (yellow card) 44'	Attendance: 6,327; Referee: (Scotland) Bobby Madden

12 December 2015 Premiership	Motherwell	3–1	Dundee	Fir Park
15:00	McDonald 6' (yellow card) 60'; Moult 32'; Pearson 90+1'	Summary	Irvine (yellow card) 57'; McGowan (yellow card) 67'; Harkins 68'	Attendance: 3,512; Referee: (Scotland) Euan Anderson

19 December 2015 Premiership	Dundee	4–0	Hamilton Academical	Dens Park
15:00	Hemmings 5', 21', 26'; Stewart 19' (yellow card) 52'	Report	Gillespie (yellow card) 70'	Attendance: 4,568; Referee: (Scotland) Don Robertson

26 December 2015 Premiership	Ross County	5–2	Dundee	Victoria Park
15:00	Boyce 29', 69', 85'; Gardyne 55'; Irvine 60'; Foster (yellow card) 80'	Report	Hemmings 5', 53'; Konrad (yellow card) 39'; Irvine (yellow card) 45'	Attendance: 3,687; Referee: Allan

2 January 2016 Premiership	Dundee	2–1	Dundee United	Dens Park
	Hemmings 41'; Ross 62'	BBC Report	Spittal 15'; Demel (yellow card) 82' (yellow-red card)	Attendance: 11,025; Referee: Clancy

16 January 2016 Premiership	Partick Thistle	2–4	Dundee	Firhill Stadium
15:00	Amoo 23'; Lindsay (yellow card) 77' (yellow-red card); Doolan 90'	BBC Report	Hemmings 7' (pen.); Harkins 10', 37'; Stewart 15'	Attendance: 3,222; Referee: Anderson

22 January 2016 Premiership	Aberdeen	1–0	Dundee	Pittodrie Stadium
19:45	Rooney 14'	BBC Report		Attendance: 11,805; Referee: Muir

30 January 2016 Premiership	Dundee	2–2	Motherwell	Dens Park
15:00	McGowan 6'; Hemmings 88' (pen.)	BBC Report	Cadden 4'; Pearson 23'	Attendance: 4,960; Referee: Beaton

12 February 2016 Premiership	Dundee	2–0	St Johnstone	Dens Park
19:45	Hemmings 21', 51'; O'Dea (yellow card) 66'; Stewart (yellow card) 90'	Report	Fisher (yellow card) 58'; Cummins (yellow card) 66'; Davidson (yellow card) 76'; Swanson (yellow card) 85'	Attendance: 4,876; Referee: (Scotland) Thomson

20 February 2016 Premiership	Kilmarnock	0–0	Dundee	Rugby Park
15:00	McHattie (yellow card) 90'	Report	Loy (yellow card) 86'	Attendance: 3,688; Referee: (Scotland) Euan Anderson

27 February 2016 Premiership	Dundee	1–1	Inverness CT	Dens Park
15:00	Stewart (yellow card) 26'; Ross (yellow card) 61'; Hemmings 86'	Report	Draper 13'; Tremarco (yellow card) 26'; Vigurs (yellow card) 31'; Devine (yellow card) 36'; Fôn Williams (yellow card) 43'	Attendance: 5,048; Referee: (Scotland) Andrew Dallas

2 March 2016 Premiership	Celtic	0–0	Dundee	Celtic Park
19:45	Sviatchenko (yellow card) 86'	Report	Kerr (yellow card) 90'	Attendance: 41,451; Referee: (Scotland) John Beaton

12 March 2016 Premiership	Dundee	0–1	Heart of Midlothian	Dens Park
15:00	Harkins (yellow card) 69'	Report	Öztürk (yellow card) 35'; Walker 52'; Smith (yellow card) 56'	Attendance: 6,195; Referee: (Scotland) Willie Collum

20 March 2016 Premiership	Dundee United	2–2	Dundee	Tannadice Park
12:30	Dixon (yellow card) 44'; Mckay 53' (pen.), 90+1'; Ofere (yellow card) 87'	Report	Hemmings 34', 45'; Bain (red card) 51'; Holt (yellow card) 87'	Attendance: 11,603; Referee: (Scotland) Steven McLean (referee)

2 April 2016 Premiership	Dundee	5–2	Ross County	Dens Park
15:00	Stewart 7', 90+2'; Hemmings 9'; Loy 38'; Wighton 85'	Report	Davies 15'; Schalk 45'	Attendance: 5,095; Referee: Andrew Dallas

5 April 2016 Premiership	Dundee	0–0	Celtic	Dens Park
19:45		Report		Attendance: 9,566; Referee: Kevin Clancy

9 April 2016 Premiership	Hamilton Academical	2–1	Dundee	New Douglas Park
15:00	Crawford 30'; Tena 41' (pen.)	Report	Harkins 63'	Attendance: 2,764; Referee: John Beaton

23 April 2016 Premiership	Partick Thistle	1–2	Dundee	Firhill Stadium
15:00	Doolan 70'	Report	Hemmings 34', 81'	Attendance: 2,769; Referee: Nick Walsh

2 May 2016 Premiership	Dundee	2–1	Dundee United	Dens Park
19:45	Gadzhalov 77'; Wighton 90+3'	Report	Ofere 54'	Attendance: 10,088; Referee: Willie Collum

7 May 2016 Premiership	Dundee	0–1	Hamilton Academical	Dens Park
15:00		Report	Morris 8'	Attendance: 4,757; Referee: Steven McLean

11 May 2016 Premiership	Dundee	1–1	Kilmarnock	Rugby Park
19:45	Loy 18'	Report	Balatoni 55'	Attendance: 4,335; Referee: Don Robertson

14 May 2016 Premiership	Inverness CT	4–0	Dundee	Caledonian Stadium
12:30	Storey 61'; Devine 69'; Draper 71'; Foran 84' (pen.)	Report		Attendance: 3,794; Referee: Barry Cook

=== Scottish League Cup ===
25 August 2015 Second round	Dunfermline Athletic	3–1	Dundee	East End Park
19:45	El Bakhtaoui 11', 90+4'; Cardle 86'	BBC Report	Hemmings 48'	Attendance: 3,806; Referee: Finnie

=== Scottish Cup ===
26 January 2016 Fourth round	Dundee	3–1	Falkirk	Dens Park
19:45	Hemmings 39', 60'; Harkins 74'	BBC Sport	Watson 41'	Attendance: 4,279; Referee: Collum

6 February 2016 Fifth round	Dumbarton	0–0	Dundee	Dumbarton Football Stadium
15:00		BBC Report		Attendance: 1,410; Referee: Finnie

23 February 2016 Fifth round replay	Dundee	5–0	Dumbarton	Dens Park
19:45	McGinn 16'; Harkins (yellow card) 25'; Hemmings 29' (yellow card) 45'; Stewart 51', 90'; Loy (yellow card) 76'; Holt 79'	Summary	Nadé (yellow card) 39'; Routledge (yellow card) 90'	Attendance: 3,532; Referee: (Scotland) Stephen Finnie

5 March 2016 Quarter-finals	Rangers	4–0	Dundee	Ibrox Stadium
12:30	Forrester 1' (yellow card) 1'; Holt 47'; Halliday 54'; Wallace 84'	Report	Konrad (yellow card) 19' o'Dea (yellow card) 64'	Attendance: 30,944; Referee: (Scotland) Alan Muir

== Squad statistics ==
During the 2015–16 season, Dundee have used twenty-six different players in competitive games.

As of 14 May 2016 (UTC)

No.	Pos	Nat	Player	Total		Premiership		League Cup		Scottish Cup	
No.	Pos	Nat	Player	Apps	Goals	Apps	Goals	Apps	Goals	Apps	Goals
1	GK	(Scotland) SCO	Scott Bain	42	0	37+0	0	1+0	0	4+0	0
2	DF	(Scotland) SCO	Gary Irvine	7	0	6+1	0	0+0	0	0+0	0
3	DF	(Scotland) SCO	Kevin Holt	39	3	34+0	2	1+0	0	4+0	1
4	DF	(Germany) GER	Thomas Konrad	32	0	20+7	0	1+0	0	4+0	0
5	DF	(Northern Ireland) NIR	James McPake	17	2	16+0	2	1+0	0	0+0	0
6	DF	(Scotland) SCO	Daryll Meggatt	6	0	2+4	0	0+0	0	0+0	0
7	FW	(Scotland) SCO	Greg Stewart	42	11	36+1	9	1+0	0	4+0	2
8	MF	(Scotland) SCO	Nicky Low	23	0	15+6	0	0+0	0	1+1	0
9	FW	(Scotland) SCO	Rory Loy	33	9	21+8	9	0+0	0	3+1	0
10	FW	(Scotland) SCO	Kevin Thomson	12	0	11+1	0	0+0	0	0+0	0
11	MF	(Scotland) SCO	Simon Ferry	1	0	0+1	0	0+0	0	0+0	0
12	GK	(Scotland) SCO	David Mitchell	2	0	1+1	0	0+0	0	0+0	0
15	FW	(England) ENG	Kane Hemmings	42	25	34+3	21	1+0	1	4+0	3
16	DF	(Spain) ESP	Julen Etxabeguren	26	0	20+3	0	1+0	0	0+2	0
17	MF	(Scotland) SCO	Nick Ross	42	1	36+1	1	1+0	0	4+0	0
18	MF	(Scotland) SCO	Paul Mcgowan	35	1	27+3	1	1+0	0	4+0	0
19	DF	(Scotland) SCO	Paul McGinn	39	1	33+1	0	1+0	0	4+0	1
20	DF	(England) ENG	Riccardo Calder	11	0	3+8	0	0+0	0	0+0	0
21	FW	(Germany) GER	Luka Tankulić	1	0	0+1	0	0+0	0	0+0	0
21	DF	(Republic of Ireland) IRL	Darren O'Dea	19	0	16+0	0	0+0	0	3+0	0
22	FW	(Spain) ESP	Arturo Rodriguez	5	0	0+3	0	0+0	0	0+2	0
23	FW	(England) ENG	Rhys Healey	7	1	4+3	1	0+0	0	0+0	0
24	MF	(Scotland) SCO	Andrew Black	1	0	0+1	0	0+0	0	0+0	0
26	DF	(Bulgaria) BUL	Kostadin Gadzhalov	15	1	8+6	1	0+0	0	1+0	0
27	MF	(Australia) AUS	Jesse Curran	3	0	0+3	0	0+0	0	0+0	0
28	MF	(Canada) CAN	Dylan Carreiro	3	0	0+2	0	0+1	0	0+0	0
29	MF	(Scotland) SCO	Gary Harkins	35	5	22+8	4	1+0	0	4+0	1
30	DF	(Scotland) SCO	Cammy Kerr	11	0	7+3	0	0+0	0	0+1	0
33	FW	(Scotland) SCO	Craig Wighton	15	2	7+6	2	0+0	0	0+2	0
35	FW	(Scotland) SCO	Calvin Colquhoun	3	0	2+1	0	0+0	0	0+0	0

=== Disciplinary record ===
As of 14 May 2016 (UTC)

Position	Nation	Number	Name	Premiership		League Cup		Scottish Cup		Total	
Position	Nation	Number	Name	Yellow card	Red card	Yellow card	Red card	Yellow card	Red card	Yellow card	Red card
1	(Scotland)	GK	Scott Bain	2	1	0	0	0	0	2	1
2	(Scotland)	DF	Gary Irvine	3	0	0	0	0	0	3	0
3	(Scotland)	DF	Kevin Holt	5	0	0	0	0	0	5	0
4	(Germany)	DF	Thomas Konrad	4	0	0	0	1	0	5	0
5	(Northern Ireland)	DF	James McPake	2	0	0	0	0	0	2	0
6	(Scotland)	DF	Daryll Meggatt	3	0	0	0	0	0	3	0
7	(Scotland)	FW	Greg Stewart	10	0	0	0	0	0	10	0
8	(Scotland)	MF	Nicky Low	1	0	0	0	0	0	1	0
9	(Scotland)	FW	Rory Loy	1	0	0	0	1	0	2	0
10	(Scotland)	FW	Kevin Thomson	2	0	0	0	0	0	2	0
15	(England)	FW	Kane Hemmings	1	0	0	0	1	0	2	0
16	(Spain)	DF	Julen Etxabeguren	5	0	0	0	0	0	5	0
17	(Scotland)	MF	Nick Ross	4	0	0	0	0	0	4	0
18	(Scotland)	MF	Paul McGowan	4	0	0	0	0	0	4	0
19	(Scotland)	DF	Paul McGinn	5	0	1	0	0	0	6	0
21	(Republic of Ireland)	DF	Darren O'Dea	3	0	0	0	2	0	5	0
24	(Scotland)	MF	Andrew Black	1	0	0	0	0	0	1	0
26	(Bulgaria)	DF	Kostadin Gadzhalov	1	0	0	0	0	0	1	0
29	(Scotland)	MF	Gary Harkins	6	1	1	0	1	0	8	1
30	(Scotland)	DF	Cammy Kerr	1	0	0	0	0	0	1	0
35	(Scotland)	MF	Calvin Colquhoun	1	0	0	0	0	0	1	0
Total				66	2	2	0	6	0	73	2

== Team statistics ==
=== League table ===
Pos	Team	Pld	W	D	L	GF	GA	GD	Pts	Qualification or relegation (Note: Teams play each other three times (33 matches), before the league is split into two groups (the top six and the bottom six).)
6	Ross County	38	14	6	18	55	61	−6	48	
7	Inverness Caledonian Thistle	38	14	10	14	54	48	+6	52	
8	Dundee	38	11	15	12	53	57	−4	48	
9	Partick Thistle	38	12	10	16	41	50	−9	46	
10	Hamilton Academical	38	11	10	17	42	63	−21	43	

Source: Scottish Premiership, Soccerway (first phase), Soccerway (second phase)
Rules for classification: 1) Points; 2) Goal difference; 3) Goals scored; 4) Play-off (only if deciding champion, UEFA competitions qualification and second stage group allocation).

=== Division summary ===
Round	1	2	3	4	5	6	7	8	9	10	11	12	13	14	15	16	17	18	19	20	21	22	23	24	25	26	27	28	29	30	31	32	33	34	35	36	37	38
Ground	A	H	A	H	A	H	A	A	H	H	A	H	A	H	A	A	H	A	H	A	H	A	A	H	H	A	H	A	H	A	H	H	A	A	H	H	H	A
Result	W	L	D	W	L	D	W	L	D	W	D	L	D	D	D	D	L	L	W	L	W	W	L	D	W	D	D	D	L	D	W	D	L	W	W	L	D	L
Position	1	4	4	4	6	6	5	6	6	6	6	7	7	7	6	6	7	7	6	7	7	6	6	6	5	6	6	5	6	8	7	6	7	7	7	7	8	8

Updated to match(es) played on 14 May 2016. Source:
A = Away; H = Home; W = Win; D = Draw; L = Loss

=== Management statistics ===
Last updated on 14 May 2016

Name	From	To	P	W	D	L	Win% (Note: Win% is the percentage of matches won rounded to two decimal places.)
Paul Hartley	1 August 2015	Present	38	11	15	12	28.95

== Transfers ==
=== Players in ===
Player	From	Fee
(England) Kane Hemmings	(England) Barnsley	Free
(Australia) Jesse Curran	(Australia) Central Coast Mariners	Free
(Scotland) Nick Ross	(Scotland) Inverness Caledonian Thistle	Free
(Scotland) Rory Loy	(Scotland) Falkirk	Free
(Scotland) Kevin Holt	(Scotland) Queen of the South	Undisclosed
(Scotland) Nicky Low	(Scotland) Aberdeen	Free
(Scotland) Daryll Meggatt	(Scotland) Alloa Athletic	Free
(Scotland) David Mitchell	(Scotland) Stranraer	Free
(Spain) Julen Etxabeguren	(Scotland) East Fife	Free
(England) Riccardo Calder	(England) Aston Villa	Loan
(England) Rhys Healey	(Wales) Cardiff City	Loan
(Republic of Ireland) Darren O'Dea	(India) Mumbai City	Free
(Spain) Arturo Rodriguez	(Spain) Córdoba	Loan

=== Players out ===
Player	To	Fee
(Scotland) David Clarkson	(Scotland) Motherwell	Free
(Scotland) Martin Boyle	(Scotland) Hibernian	Free
(Scotland) Kyle Benedictus	(Scotland) Raith Rovers	Free
(Wales) Kyle Letheren	(England) Blackpool	Free
(Scotland) Jamie Reid	(Scotland) Arbroath	Free
(Scotland) Calum Brodie	(Scotland) Arbroath	Free
(Scotland) Jim McAlister	(England) Blackpool	Free
(Republic of Ireland) Paul Heffernan	(Scotland) Queen of the South	Free
(Scotland) Iain Davidson	(Scotland) Raith Rovers	Free
(Scotland) Kevin McBride	(Scotland) Airdrieonians	Free
(Scotland) Craig Wighton	(Scotland) Raith Rovers	Loan
(Germany) Luka Tankulić	(Germany) Sportfreunde Lotte	Free
(Republic of Ireland) Philip Roberts	(Republic of Ireland) Sligo Rovers	Free
(Scotland) Simon Ferry	(Scotland) Peterhead	Free
(Scotland) Kevin Thomson	(Scotland) Hibernian	Free

== See also ==
- List of Dundee F.C. seasons
