= 2014–15 Dundee F.C. season =

Dundee
2014–15 season
- Chairman: Bill Colvin
- Manager: Paul Hartley
- Stadium: Dens Park; Dundee, Scotland
- Premiership: 6th
- League Cup: Third round, lost to Dundee United
- Scottish Cup: Fifth round, lost to Celtic
- Top goalscorer: League: Greg Stewart (13 goals); All: Greg Stewart (15 goals)
- Highest home attendance: 11,447 vs. Dundee United, Premiership, 21 September 2014
- Lowest home attendance: 5,017 vs. Ross County, Premiership, 4 January 2015
- Average home league attendance: 6,966
Home colours	Away colours

The 2014–15 season was Dundee's first season back in the top tier of Scottish football and their first season in the Scottish Premiership, having been promoted from the Scottish Championship at the end of the previous season. Dundee also competed in the League Cup and the Scottish Cup.

== Season ==
=== Summary ===
Dundee finished sixth in the Scottish Premiership with 45 points. They also reached the third round of the League Cup and fifth round of the Scottish Cup.

== Results and fixtures ==
Win Draw Loss Postponed

=== Friendlies ===
13 July 2014	Dundee	2–0	Manchester City	Dundee, Scotland
16:00	Harkins 26'; Tankulić 38'	Report		Stadium: Dens Park; Attendance: 6,859

26 May 2015 Julian Speroni Testimonial	Crystal Palace	4–3	Dundee	London
19:45 BST	Bolasie 6'; Lee 23'; Gayle 30', 38'	Report	Carreiro 34'; Adam 85'; Kerr 86'	Stadium: Selhurst Park; Attendance: 11,509 (1,750 Dundee fans); Referee: Dermot Gallagher

=== Scottish Premiership ===
9 August 2014 1	Dundee	1–1	Kilmarnock	Dens Park
15:00	Harkins 17' (pen.)	BBC Report	Slater 24'	Attendance: 7,588; Referee: McLean

13 August 2014 2	Inverness Caledonian Thistle	0–0	Dundee	Caledonian Stadium
19:45		BBC Report		Attendance: 3,082; Referee: Finnie

16 August 2014 3	Dundee	1–1	Partick Thistle	Dens Park
15:00	Wighton 54'	BBC Report	Fraser 4'; Fox (red card) 61'	Attendance: 6,453; Referee: Charleston

23 August 2014 4	St Mirren	0–1	Dundee	St Mirren Park
15:00		BBC Report	MacDonald 80'	Attendance: 4,517; Referee: Beaton

31 August 2014 5	Dundee	1–1	Celtic	Dens Park
13:30	McPake 1'	BBC Report	Griffiths 55'	Attendance: 9,276; Referee: Craig Thomson

13 September 2014 6	St Johnstone	0–1	Dundee	McDiarmid Park
16:00		Report	Harkins 28'	Attendance: 6,562; Referee: Willie Collum

21 September 2014 7	Dundee	1–4	Dundee United	Dens Park
13:15	Konrad (yellow card) 24' (yellow-red card) 90'; Erskine (yellow card) 40'; Stewart (yellow card) 71' (goal) 90+3'	Report	Bilate 25' (pen.); Paton (yellow card) 45'; Dow 54' (yellow card) 54'; Morris 59'; Watson (yellow card) 73' (goal) 79'	Attendance: 11,447; Referee: Steven McLean

27 September 2014 8	Ross County	2–1	Dundee	Global Energy Stadium
16:00	Gardyne 27'; Maatsen 90'	Report	Clarkson 69'	Attendance: 3,118; Referee: Craig Charleston

4 October 2014 9	Dundee	2–3	Aberdeen	Dens Park
16:00	Harkins 6'; Clarkson 55' (pen.)	Report	Considine 5'; McPake 28' (o.g.); Goodwillie 64'	Attendance: 8,784; Referee: William Collum

18 October 2014 10	Motherwell	1–3	Dundee	Fir Park
16:00	Ojamaa 62'	Report	Clarkson 3'; Harkins 30'; Stewart 59'	Attendance: 4,061; Referee: Brian Colvin

25 October 2014 11	Dundee	2–0	Hamilton Academical	Dens Park
16:00	Clarkson 69'; Stewart 73'	Report		Attendance: 6,035; Referee: Beaton

1 November 2014 12	Kilmarnock	1–3	Dundee	Rugby Park
16:00	Eremenko 76'	Report	Stewart 44', 90'; Clarkson 51'	Attendance: 4,481; Referee: Greg Aitken

8 November 2014 13	Dundee	1–1	St Johnstone	Dens Park
16:00	Clarkson 41'	Report	Graham 53' (pen.)	Attendance: 6,931; Referee: Bobby Madden

22 November 2014 14	Celtic	2–1	Dundee	Celtic Park
16:00	Stokes 45'; Guidetti 54'	Report	Clarkson 58'	Attendance: 43,787; Referee: Kevin Clancy

6 December 2014 15	Dundee	1–2	Inverness CT	Dens Park
16:00	Stewart 21'	Report	McKay 55'; Christie 88'	Attendance: 5,400; Referee: William Collum

13 December 2014 16	Hamilton Academical	2–1	Dundee	New Douglas Park
16:00	Andreu 3'; Antoine-Curier 14'	Report	Stewart 61'	Attendance: 2,636; Referee: Alan Muir

20 December 2014 17	Partick Thistle	1–1	Dundee	Firhill Stadium
16:00	Craigen 58'	Report	Balatoni 90' (o.g.)	Attendance: 3,203; Referee: Craig Thomson

27 December 2014 18	Dundee	1–3	St Mirren	Dens Park
16:00	Irvine 84'	Report	McLean 2', 79'; Mallan 68'	Attendance: 6,447; Referee: Don Robertson

1 January 2015 19	Dundee United	6–2	Dundee	Tannadice Park
13:15	Armstrong 1'; Mackay-Steven 27', 42'; Erskine 31'; Fojut 64'; Telfer 83'	Report	Stewart 24'; Tankulić 90'	Attendance: 12,964; Referee: Kevin Clancy

4 January 2015 20	Dundee	1–1	Ross County	Dens Park
	McAlister 52'	Report	Curran 65'	Attendance: 5,017; Referee: Craig Thomson

10 January 2015 21	Dundee	4–1	Motherwell	Dens Park
16:00	Harris 1'; Stewart 8'; Irvine 34'; O'Brien 70'	Report	Sutton 19'	Attendance: 5,105; Referee: Stephen Finnie

17 January 2015 22	Aberdeen	3–3	Dundee	Pittodrie Stadium
16:00	Goodwillie 7'; Hayes 87' (pen.); Jack 90'	Report	Irvine 38'; Stewart 40'; Harkins 48'	Attendance: 16,796; Referee: Alan Muir

21 January 2015 23	Dundee	1–0	Kilmarnock	Dens Park
20:45	Stewart 40' (pen.)	Report		Attendance: 5,141; Referee: James Christie

24 January 2015 24	St Mirren	1–2	Dundee	St Mirren Park
16:00	McLean 40'	Report	Irvine 53'; Davidson 69'	Attendance: 4,010; Referee: McLean

31 January 2015 25	Dundee	1–1	Hamilton Academical	Dens Park
16:00	Stewart 88'	Report	Canning 88'	Attendance: 5,618; Referee: Crawford Allan

14 February 2015 26	Dundee	1–0	Partick Thistle	Dens Park
16:00	McGowan 88'	Report		Attendance: 5,560; Referee: Craig Thomson

21 February 2015 27	Motherwell	0–1	Dundee	Fir Park
16:00		Report	McGinn 12'	Attendance: 4,282; Referee: Don Robertson

28 February 2015 28	Ross County	1–0	Dundee	Global Energy Stadium
16:00	Reckord 66'	Report		Attendance: 3,413; Referee: Andrew Dallas

21 March 2015 29	Dundee	1–1	Aberdeen	Dens Park
12:15	McGinn 69'	Report	Rooney 36'	Attendance: 7,014; Referee: Craig Thomson

4 April 2015 30	Inverness CT	1–1	Dundee	Caledonian Stadium
16:00	Shinnie 55'	Report	Clarkson 53'	Attendance: 3,362; Referee: William Collum

8 April 2015 31	Dundee	3–1	Dundee Utd	Dens Park
20:45	Stewart 14'; McPake 23'; Heffernan 68'	Report	Çiftçi 16' (pen.)	Attendance: 10,510; Referee: John Beaton

11 April 2015 32	St Johnstone	1–0	Dundee	McDiarmid Park
16:00	Graham 26'	Report		Attendance: 6,386; Referee: Steven McLean

22 April 2015 33	Dundee	1–2	Celtic	Dens Park
20:45	McAlister 87'	Report	Mackay-Steven 32' van Dijk 63'	Attendance: 8,908; Referee: Calum Murray

25 April 2015 34	Dundee	0–2	St Johnstone	Dens Park
16:00		Report	Swanson 53'; Wotherspoon 67'	Attendance: 6,530; Referee: Craig Thomson

1 May 2015 35	Celtic	5–0	Dundee	Celtic Park
20:45	Griffiths 30'; Brown 37'; Commons 71' (pen.); Forrest 77'; Bitton 88'	Report		Attendance: 44,299; Referee: Bobby Madden

9 May 2015 36	Dundee	0–1	Inverness CT	Dens Park
16:00		Report	Ofere 8'	Attendance: 5,123; Referee: Don Robertson

16 May 2015 37	Dundee	1–1	Aberdeen	Dens Park
16:00	Tankulić 43'	Report	Rooney 90'	Attendance: 6,434; Referee: Euan Anderson

24 May 2015 38	Dundee United	3–0	Dundee	Tannadice Park
13:30	Çiftçi 8', 31' (pen.); Spittal 50'	Report		Attendance: 10,812; Referee: Bobby Madden

=== League Cup ===
2 August 2014 First round	Dundee	4–0	Peterhead	Dens Park
16:00	Ferry 22'; Stewart 45'; MacDonald 78'; Tankulic 82'	BBC Report		Attendance: 3,079; Referee: Collum

26 August 2014 Second round	Dundee	4–0	Raith Rovers	Dens Park
20:45	Stewart 3'; McGinn 43'; MacDonald 59'; Boyle 70'	BBC Report		Attendance: 2,645; Referee: Clancy

24 September 2014 Third round	Dundee United	1–0	Dundee	Tannadice Park
19:45	Fojut 90+2'	Report		Attendance: 13,041; Referee: Craig Thomson

=== Scottish Cup ===
29 November 2014 Fourth round	Dundee	2–1	Aberdeen	Dens Park
15:00	Konrad 4'; Clarkson 90'	Report	Konrad 17' (o.g.)	Attendance: 5,956; Referee: McLean

7 February 2015 Fifth round	Dundee	0–2	Celtic	Dens Park
12:30		Report	Griffiths 7'; Johansen 47'	Attendance: 7,525; Referee: John Beaton

== Player statistics ==
During the 2014–15 season, Dundee have used twenty three different players in competitive games. The table below shows the number of appearances and goals scored by each player.

As of 25 May 2015.

No.	Pos	Nat	Player	Total		Premiership		League Cup		Scottish Cup	
No.	Pos	Nat	Player	Apps	Goals	Apps	Goals	Apps	Goals	Apps	Goals
1	GK	(Wales) WAL	Kyle Letheren	17	0	15+0	0	2+0	0	0+0	0
2	DF	(Scotland) SCO	Gary Irvine	30	4	25+1	4	2+0	0	2+0	0
3	DF	(Scotland) SCO	Willie Dyer	24	0	18+3	0	1+0	0	1+1	0
4	DF	(Germany) GER	Thomas Konrad	37	1	30+3	0	3+0	0	1+0	1
5	DF	(Northern Ireland) NIR	James McPake	38	2	34+0	2	2+0	0	2+0	0
6	MF	(Scotland) SCO	Iain Davidson	13	1	8+4	1	1+0	0	0+0	0
8	MF	(Scotland) SCO	Kevin McBride	7	0	4+2	0	0+1	0	0+0	0
10	MF	(Scotland) SCO	Kevin Thomson	27	0	22+3	0	1+0	0	1+0	0
11	MF	(Scotland) SCO	Simon Ferry	22	1	14+5	0	2+0	1	0+1	0
12	GK	(Scotland) SCO	Scott Bain	25	0	22+0	0	1+0	0	2+0	0
14	FW	(Republic of Ireland) IRL	Philip Roberts	9	0	4+3	0	1+1	0	0+0	0
15	FW	(Scotland) SCO	Greg Stewart	40	15	32+3	13	3+0	2	2+0	0
16	FW	(Scotland) SCO	David Clarkson	26	9	18+6	8	0+0	0	1+1	1
18	FW	(Scotland) SCO	Paul McGowan	35	1	30+0	1	2+1	0	2+0	0
19	DF	(Scotland) SCO	Paul McGinn	40	2	34+1	1	3+0	1	1+1	0
20	MF	(Scotland) SCO	Jim McAlister	41	2	34+3	2	2+0	0	2+0	0
21	FW	(Germany) GER	Luka Tankulić	31	3	12+14	2	2+1	1	1+1	0
24	MF	(Scotland) SCO	Andrew Black	2	0	0+1	0	0+0	0	0+1	0
26	DF	(Bulgaria) BUL	Kostadin Gadzhalov	9	0	6+2	0	0+0	0	1+0	0
29	MF	(Scotland) SCO	Gary Harkins	31	5	21+7	5	1+1	0	1+0	0
33	FW	(Scotland) SCO	Craig Wighton	17	1	1+15	1	0+0	0	1+0	0
35	MF	(Scotland) SCO	Calvin Colquhoun	2	0	1+1	0	0+0	0	0+0	0
47	MF	(Scotland) SCO	Alex Harris	16	1	11+5	1	0+0	0	0+0	0
48	MF	(Scotland) SCO	Stephen McGinn	13	1	11+1	1	0+0	0	1+0	0
49	FW	(Republic of Ireland) IRL	Paul Heffernan	7	1	4+3	1	0+0	0	0+0	0
Players who left the club during the 2014–15 season
7	MF	(Scotland) SCO	Nicky Riley	0	0	0+0	0	0+0	0	0+0	0
9	FW	(Scotland) SCO	Peter MacDonald	9	3	2+5	1	1+1	2	0+0	0
14	FW	(Republic of Ireland) IRL	Philip Roberts	9	0	4+3	0	1+1	0	0+0	0
17	DF	(Scotland) SCO	Kyle Benedictus	1	0	0+0	0	1+0	0	0+0	0
23	FW	(Scotland) SCO	Martin Boyle	21	1	6+11	0	2+1	1	1+0	0
25	GK	(Germany) GER	Arvid Schenk	1	0	1+0	0	0+0	0	0+0	0
28	MF	(Canada) CAN	Dylan Carreiro	1	0	0+1	0	0+0	0	0+0	0
30	DF	(Scotland) SCO	Cammy Kerr	2	0	0+2	0	0+0	0	0+0	0
33	FW	(Scotland) SCO	Craig Wighton	7	1	1+6	1	0+0	0	0+0	0

== Team statistics ==
=== League table ===
Pos	Team	Pld	W	D	L	GF	GA	GD	Pts	Qualification or relegation
4	St Johnstone	38	16	9	13	34	34	0	57	Qualification for the Europa League first qualifying round
5	Dundee United	38	17	5	16	58	56	+2	56	
6	Dundee (Note: Teams in the bottom six at the time of the split (33 games) cannot pass teams in the top six)	38	11	12	15	46	57	−11	45	
7	Hamilton Academical	38	15	8	15	50	53	−3	53	
8	Partick Thistle	38	12	10	16	48	44	+4	46	

Source: SPFL
Rules for classification: 1) points; 2) goal difference; 3) number of goals scored

== Transfers ==
=== Players in ===
Player	From	Fee
(Germany) Thomas Konrad	(Germany) SV Eintracht Trier	Free
(Northern Ireland) James McPake	(Scotland) Hibernian	Free
(Scotland) Kevin Thomson	(Scotland) Hibernian	Free
(Scotland) Simon Ferry	(England) Portsmouth	Free
(Scotland) Scott Bain	(Scotland) Alloa Athletic	Free
(Republic of Ireland) Philip Roberts	(Scotland) Falkirk	Free
(Scotland) Greg Stewart	(Scotland) Cowdenbeath	Free
(Scotland) David Clarkson	(England) Bristol Rovers	Free
(Scotland) Paul McGowan	(Scotland) St Mirren	Free
(Scotland) Paul McGinn	(Scotland) Dumbarton	Free
(Germany) Luka Tankulić	(Germany) VfL Wolfsburg II	Free
(Bulgaria) Kostadin Gadzhalov	(Bulgaria) Dobrudzha Dobrich	Free
(Scotland) Grant Adam	(Scotland) Airdrieonians	Free
(Scotland) Gary Harkins	(Scotland) St Mirren	Free
(Scotland) Alex Harris	(Scotland) Hibernian	Loan
(Scotland) Stephen McGinn	(England) Sheffield United	Free
(Republic of Ireland) Paul Heffernan	(Scotland) Hibernian	Free
(Canada) Dylan Carreiro	(England) Queens Park Rangers	Free

=== Players out ===
Player	To	Fee
(Germany) Dan Twardzik	(Scotland) Motherwell	Free
(Scotland) Declan Gallagher	(Scotland) Livingston	Free
(Scotland) Ryan Conroy	(Scotland) Raith Rovers	Free
(Scotland) Martin Boyle	(Scotland) Hibernian	Loan
(France) Christian Nadé	(Scotland) Raith Rovers	Free
(Scotland) Cammy Kerr	(Scotland) Peterhead	Loan
(Scotland) Leighton McIntosh	(Scotland) Montrose	Free
(Scotland) Gavin Rae	(Australia) Hakoah Sydney City East	Free
(Scotland) Stephen Hughes	Retired	
(Scotland) Stephen O'Donnell	(Scotland) Clyde	Free
(England) Matt Lockwood	(England) Sutton United	Free
(Scotland) Craig Beattie	(Malta) Żebbuġ Rangers	Free
(Scotland) Steven Doris	(Scotland) Stirling Albion	Free
(Scotland) John Gibson	(Scotland) Alloa Athletic	Free
(Scotland) Grant Adam	(Scotland) Greenock Morton	Free
(Scotland) Jamie Reid	(Scotland) Stenhousemuir	Loan
(Scotland) Kyle Benedictus	(Scotland) Arbroath	Loan
(Canada) Dylan Carreiro	(Scotland) Arbroath	Loan
(Scotland) Nicky Riley	(Scotland) Peterhead	Loan
(Scotland) Craig Wighton	(Scotland) Brechin City	Loan
(Scotland) Peter MacDonald	(Scotland) Greenock Morton	Free
(Germany) Arvid Schenk	(Germany) Altonaer FC	Free
(Scotland) Nicky Riley	(Scotland) Peterhead	Free
(Scotland) Jamie Reid	(Scotland) Elgin City	Loan
(Republic of Ireland) Philip Roberts	(Scotland) Alloa Athletic	Loan

== Notes ==
- 1.Kickoff time in Western European Time/Western European Summer Time.
- 2.Dundee F.C.'s goals first.
