= Simon Ferry =

Scottish footballer

Si Ferry
Personal information
- Full name: Simon William Ferry
- Date of birth: 11 January 1988 (age 38)
- Place of birth: Dundee, Scotland
- Position: Midfielder

Team information
- Current team: East Kilbride (manager)

Youth career
- 2000–2006: Celtic

Senior career*
Years	Team	Apps	(Gls)
2006–2010	Celtic	0	(0)
2009–2010	→ Swindon Town (loan)	42	(2)
2010–2013	Swindon Town	107	(6)
2013–2014	Portsmouth	30	(1)
2014–2015	Dundee	20	(0)
2015–2022	Peterhead	156	(0)
2022–2023	Broomhill	5	(0)
Total		360	(11)

International career
2006	Scotland U19	9	(0)

Managerial career
- 2022–2023: Broomhill
- 2026–: East Kilbride
- * Club domestic league appearances and goals

Simon William Ferry (born 11 January 1988) is a Scottish football coach and former player who is manager for Scottish League One club East Kilbride.

Ferry started his career with Scottish Premier League club Celtic but did not play a competitive match for the first team. He spent the 2009–10 season on loan at Swindon Town, who then signed him permanently at the end of the season. Ferry then moved to Portsmouth. In June 2014, he joined Dundee and spent just over one year at the club before joining Peterhead and Broomhill. Ferry has played for the Scotland national under-19 football team and featured for them at the 2006 European Under-19 Championship.

== Club career ==
=== Celtic ===
Born in Dundee, Scotland, Ferry grew up in Menzieshill and first began his football career when he joined Dundee as a schoolboy. Ferry said that he "was hopeless at school" and "football was only ever going for him". Ferry joined Celtic when he was eleven and progressed through the club’s youth teams despite facing injury setbacks. While progressing the youth system, Ferry showed his potential at Celtic and was dubbed Neil Lennon’s clone. In January 2006, he signed a four-and-a-half-year professional contract with the club. He was part of the team that won the Under-19 League and Cup double in 2006 and was among a number of players named, by coach Willie McStay, as likely to progress to the first team.

In Celtic’s pre–season tour of 2006, Ferry made his first-team debut on a pre-season tour of Poland, playing against Legia Warsaw and Wisła Kraków. However, he was curtailed by injury problems sustained in the 2006–07 season, affecting his professional development and resulted in him missing almost three years of club football. Ferry later told BBC Wiltshire that he feared the ongoing ankle injury would end his career.

Ferry returned to the Celtic first-team squad in February 2009, having caught Gordon Strachan’s eye while training with the first team, alongside Ryan Conroy. He appeared four times in the club’s first-team squad as an unused substitute for the rest of the 2008–09 season. While playing for Celtic’s reserve squad, Ferry scored a volley in a 1–0 win against Rangers’ reserve squad to win the SPL reserve league title for the eighth consecutive time. He was featured in a Wembley Cup match against Tottenham Hotspur on 26 July 2009.

==== Swindon Town (loan) ====
It was reported on 26 August 2009 by the Swindon Advertiser that Swindon Town agreed to sign both Ferry and Celtic teammate Ben Hutchinson on loan until January 2010. The move was confirmed on 27 August 2009.

Two days later on 29 August 2009, he made his debut for the club, started the whole game, in a 2–1 victory against Southend United and was named Man of the Match award. Since joining Swindon Town, Ferry quickly established himself in the first team, playing in the midfield position. On 31 October 2009, he scored his first goal for the club, in a 4–1 win over Tranmere Rovers. He was also a fan favourite among Swindon Town’s supporters, who called him "a great acquisition". Ferry stated he would like to stay at the club on three occasions, revealing that he had adapted easily to life on and off the pitch at Swindon Town. Ferry then set up a goal for Charlie Austin in two separate matches in January against Gillingham and Leeds United on 16 January 2010 and 26 January 2010 respectively.

It was announced on 25 January 2010 that a deal had been agreed with parent club Celtic to extend his loan spell until the end of the 2009–10 season. On 23 February 2010, he scored in a 4–1 win over Stockport County. After the match, Ferry said he 'blacked out' when he scored and didn't remember the goal. However, during the season, Ferry faced injuries along the way, but he continued to remain in the squad. In a match against Southampton on 16 March 2010, Ferry received a red card in the 86th-minute for a second bookable offence, in a 1–0 win. After serving a one match suspension, he returned to the starting line–up against Hartlepool United on 27 March 2010 and set up a goal for Charlie Austin to score the only goal of the game. In the second leg of Swindon's play-off semi-final against Charlton Athletic on 17 May 2010, Ferry scored an own goal, as the game went into penalties following a 3–3 draw and the club won 5–4 in the shootout to reach the play-off final. He started in the play-off final, as Swindon would lose to Millwall 1–0, missing out on promotion to the Championship (Ferry started in the final). Despite the loss, Ferry stated playing at Wembley was a good stage in his career, describing as "need to jump one way or the other".

At the end of the 2009–10 season, he made forty–six appearances and scoring two times in all competitions. Following this, Ferry was recalled by parent club Celtic, according to Swindon Town's chairman Andrew Fitton. Swindon Advertiser praised Ferry’s time, saying: "Best loan signing made at the club since James Milner, getting him back for next season is essential."

=== Swindon Town (permanent transfer) ===
On 2 August 2010, Ferry signed a permanent deal with Swindon Town, along with Celtic teammate, defender Paul Caddis. He previously stated his wanted his move to the club turned to a permanent deal and was no longer interested in playing for Celtic’s reserve team anymore next season. Once the permanent move happened, Ferry stated that moving to Swindon Town permanently was a relief after the move was described as "deed (dead) in the water".

==== 2010–11 season ====
Ferry's first game after signing for Swindon Town on a permanent basis came in the opening game of the season, coming on as a 69th-minute substitute for David Prutton, in a 2–1 loss against Brighton & Hove Albion. However, at the start of the 2010–11 season, he found himself in and out of the starting eleven, due to competitions from the midfield position, such as, Jonathan Douglas, David Prutton, Michael Timlin and Will Evans. But Ferry suffered ankle injury in training, resulting in him being out for two matches. On 28 September 2010, he returned from injury, coming on as a 78th-minute substitute for Thomas Dossevi, in a 3–2 loss against Plymouth Argyle. On 11 October 2010, Ferry set up a goal for Vincent Péricard, in a 2–1 win against Bristol Rovers. He started in the next five matches following his return from injury before suffering another a leg injury after being tackled by Nathan Jones and was substituted at half-time, in a 3–3 draw against Yeovil Town on 30 October 2010. After the match, manager Danny Wilson said that Ferry was fortunate to avoid having a broken leg. He was soon out for weeks with a leg injury. Ferry didn’t make his first team return until on 26 November 2010, coming on as a late substitute, in a 1–1 draw against Crawley Town in the second round of the FA Cup.

Since returning from injury, Ferry acknowledged about his playing time, saying: "You want to play all the time every week. Obviously I know it’s not always going to happen like it did last year and in your career your not going to play all the time, so I just need to get on with it really." Initially, he started for four matches for the club between 28 December 2010 and 8 January 2011. But as the 2010–11 season progressed, Ferry found himself in and out of the starting eleven for Swindon Town, as he found his playing time coming from the substitute bench.

Ferry’s lack of playing of time led to criticism by the club’s supporter, who regularly wrote on Swindon Advertiser, believing that starting him would have a make a big difference to the match. There was a rumours of a fallen out between him and manager Paul Hart, who put him on the substitute bench. After spending a month on the substitute bench, he made his return to the starting eleven, playing the whole game, against Sheffield Wednesday on 25 April 2011, as Swindon Town loss 3–1, resulting in their relegation to League Two next season. The follow–up match against Oldham Athletic saw Ferry start once again, as he put in a man-of-the-match performance, in a 2–0 loss. At the end of the 2010–11 season, Ferry made twenty–five appearances in all competitions. He reflected on Swindon Town’s relegation, describing it "as the most frustrating season of his life".

==== 2011–12 season ====
Ahead of the 2011–12 season, Ferry believed he could look forward to life at Swindon Town following the appointment of Paolo Di Canio as their new manager. Ferry, however, was featured little in the club’s pre–season tour and only scored once against Norcia XI on 10 July 2011. However, the arrival of Oliver Risser, Jonathan Smith and Alan McCormack led to him being behind in the pecking order for a place in the centre of midfield as the 2011–12 season about to start. According to Di Canio, he was considering leaving the club, saying: "I was not happy with the way Ferry behaved, not that he was lazy because he always trained well but he did not show me the real desire to do something more and try to put the opponent under pressure. But Ferry has shown to me in the last 10 days though that he has improved and I told him that he deserves to play on occasion."

In the first month of the 2011–12 season, Ferry made three starts for Swindon Town out of the five matches. As a result, manager Di Canio insists Ferry will stay at the club and plan to include him in the first team regularly. His promise was fulfilled, as he began to feature more in the midfield position, partnering with Smith and McCormack. Having featured in eight out of nine games for Swindon Town, Ferry overly praised Di Canio's squad selection that saw him dropped from the starting eleven for one match against Crawley Town on 13 September 2011. He scored his first goal on his return and first since moving to Swindon Town permanently, in a 3–3 draw against Hereford United on 8 October 2011. Di Canio praised Ferry on his home form, describing him as the club’s main player that pressed everywhere and challenged every ball. On 12 November 2011, he scored his first FA Cup goal, in a 4–1 win against Huddersfield Town of League One in the first round of the FA Cup and was named Man of the Match. In early–December, Ferry missed one match due to an illness. But he returned to the starting line–up, in a 1–1 draw against Bristol Rovers on 10 December 2011.

Ferry’s performances at Swindon Town saw him linked a move away from the club, he ruled out leaving, stating that he’s happy to be playing every week. Ferry started the whole game against Wigan Athletic in the third round of the FA Cup and helped the club win 2–1 to advance to the next round. After the match, he and the rest of the team were awarded the Ronnie Radford Award. However, in a match against Crawley Town on 14 February 2012, Ferry was substituted in the 36th-minute and missed one match due to a chest infection. On 21 February 2012, he returned from his illness, coming on as a 56th-minute substitute, in a 2–1 win against Shrewsbury Town. Following his return, Ferry regained his first team place, playing in the midfield position, for the rest of the season. He started in the Football League Trophy final, as Swindon Town loss 2-0 against Chestefield.

In mid-April, with Swindon Town in the brink of promotion, however, Ferry was among several players on a wild night out after a match against Aldershot Town and was later forced to apologise by releasing a statement on the club website saying they had "let their standards massively slip". Despite the incident, Di Canio forgave the players, including Ferry after giving a warning to the players involved to never let him down again. Shortly after, it expected that Ferry were among four players to be left out of the squad but he started the whole game, in a 3–1 loss against Gillingham on 21 April 2012, which saw Swindon Town secure promotion. In a follow–up match against Port Vale, Ferry set up one of the goals, in a 5–0 win to help the club finish first place in the league. At the end of the 2011–12 season, he made the most appearances with the club, making fifty–three appearances in all competitions.

After Swindon Town's promotion return to League One, Ferry was once again praised by Di Canio for his determination to force his into the club’s first team. Reflecting on the 2011–12 season, he said: "I have never really had a normal season here, one season has been brilliant, then the next has been bad and I would just like a normal season now. This is what you work all year for, and to round it off with a performance like we did is very special. I am just pleased for all the boys because we deserve it as there has been a lot of hard work over the course of the season. When you are relegated you owe the fans and people who work at the club something, so we always wanted to go back up, but to do it as champions is great and cancels out everything that happened last season. I think when you’re doing well that goes hand in hand. When you’re not doing so well fans start to get on your back and I think it’s highlighted more when you’re not doing well. It’s been a good season and the fans have been brilliant, they’ve been unbelievable. The crowds we’ve been getting have been a credit to them."

==== 2012–13 season ====
Ahead of the 2012–13 season, with Swindon Town’s promotion return to League One, Ferry was captaincy role for the club’s friendly match against Verona Select XI. Since the start of the season, he continued to maintain his first team place at Swindon Town, playing in the midfield position. After missing one match, Ferry returned to the first team, coming on as a 66th-minute substitute, in a 4–0 win against AFC Bournemouth on 24 September 2012. in a follow–up match against Shrewsbury Town, he scored his first goal in two years, in a 1–0 win. After the match, Ferry said that his aim was to score more goals for the club. He also was named in League One Team of the Week for the first time.

Following his return from a one match absence, Ferry continued to regain his first team place, playing in the midfield position. On 5 November 2012, he captained Swindon Town for the first time against Macclesfield Town in the first round of the FA Cup, but the club loss 2–0. On 10 November 2012, Ferry scored his second goal of the season in a 2–0 win over Walsall. In a follow–up match against Yeovil Town, he set up a goal for Andy Williams and Darren Ward, in a 4–1 win. In December 2012, Ferry suffered a minor knocks on two occasions but he quickly recovered and resumed his place in the first team. Ferry then set up a goal for Andy Williams, who went on to score twice in a match, winning 5–0 against Tranmere Rovers on 21 December 2012.

Ferry played out of his position for the first time this season when he played in the right–back position, in a 1–1 draw against Crawley Town on 2 February 2013. A week later on 9 February 2013, Ferry scored his third goal of the season, in a 1–1 draw against Hartlepool United. He captained Swindon Town once again and helped the club win 3–1 against Tranmere Rovers on 19 February 2013. In a follow–up match against Preston North End, Ferry suffered ankle injury and was substituted in the 70th-minute, as Swindon Town won 3–1. After missing one match due to an injury, he returned to the starting line–up, in a 1–1 draw against Coventry City on 2 March 2013. Following his return from injury, Ferry briefly played on the right midfield position, under newly manager Kevin MacDonald, mainly due to lack of options in that position. He also scored on 9 March 2013 and 12 March 2013 against Walsall and Brentford respectively. Ferry was, once again, named in League One Team of the Week for the second time on. In a follow–up match against Yeovil Town, he suffered a hamstring injury that saw him substituted in the 70th minute, in a 2–0 win. But Ferry quickly recovered and returned to the starting line–up, in a 0–0 draw against Notts County on 23 March 2013. However, he suffered another hamstring injury and was substituted in the 52th minute, in a 4–1 win against Crewe Alexandra on 16 April 2013. After the match, Ferry was out for the last two league matches of the season. But he returned to the starting line–up against Brentford in the League One play–offs first leg and set up the opening goal, in a 1–1 draw. In the return leg, Ferry set up a goal, which saw the match went on penalty shootout following a 4–4 draw on aggregate and the club lose 5–4 as a result. At the end of the 2012–13 season, he went on to make fifty appearances and scoring five times in all competitions.

With his contract expiring at the end of the 2012–13 season, it was reported by Swindon Advertiser that Ferry was guaranteed to be offered a new contract with Swindon Town. Following the club’s unsuccessful play–offs campaign, however, he was released by the club, due to their playing budget was being halved. Shortly being released by the club, Ferry had an unsuccessful trial at Yeovil Town after featuring in the friendly match against Poole Town.

=== Portsmouth ===
On 25 July 2013, Ferry signed a two-year contract with League Two side Portsmouth, on a free transfer. Upon joining the club, manager Guy Whittingham described Ferry as someone he needs, due to being "extremely fit and his work-rate is fantastic, something our fans demand. He's also somebody who can link play, be defending our box one minute and the next attacking the opposition. I think his all-round game is very good. Simon is a big part of what we want to achieve."

He made his debut for Portsmouth, starting the whole game, in a 4–1 home defeat to Oxford United on 3 August 2013 in the opening game of the season. In the first two months to the season, Ferry became a first team regular, playing in the midfield position. He scored his first Pompey goal, in a 2–1 away victory over Burton Albion on 14 September 2013. After the match, Ferry believes the club need to perform well if they were to become a serious contender in League Two. Ferry, at the time, started every league game for Portsmouth until he sustained a hamstring injury and was substituted in the 15th minute, in a 4–2 loss against York City on 28 September 2013. After missing out three games, Ferry returned to the starting line–up and played 83 minutes before being substituted, in a 1–1 draw against Torquay United on 26 October 2013. After the draw with Torquay United, he was happy to make his return after being on the sidelines. In a follow–up match against Exeter City on 2 November 2013, Ferry captained the club for the first time and helped the side win 3–2. However, his return was short–lived when he suffered a hamstring injury and missed three matches.

On 14 December 2013, Ferry made his return from injury, coming on as an 80th-minute substitute, in a 2–0 loss against Newport County. In a match against Dagenham & Redbridge on 26 December 2013, he suffered another hamstring injury and was substituted in the 55th minute, as Portsmouth won 1–0. On 11 January 2014, Ferry returned to the starting line–up as captain, in a 0–0 draw against Oxford United. In a follow–up match against Mansfield Town, however, he played 50 minutes before suffering a hamstring injury, in a 1–1 draw. After the match, Ferry would be out for three months with a hamstring injury. On 5 April 2014, he returned to the starting line–up as captain and played 69 minutes before being substituted, in a 1–0 win against Hartlepool United. In a follow–up match against Dagenham & Redbridge, however, Ferry forced to come off in the 38th-minute and was substituted, in a 4–1 win. After the match, it announced that he missed the rest of the season because of his back injury.

At the end of the 2013–14 season, Ferry made twenty–two appearances and scoring once in all competitions. After one season with Portsmouth, he left the club by mutual consent despite having one-year contract left and was rumoured to leave for Scotland.

=== Dundee ===
On 7 June 2014, Ferry moved back to Scotland, where he signed for Dundee, becoming the sixth signing of the season, ahead of their Scottish Premiership campaign, following their promotion. Upon the move to the Dees, Manager Paul Hartley said that signing Ferry would boost the club's attack saying: "Simon played the last year as a sitting midfielder but I see his strengths in attacking and going forward with the ball. He is young and dynamic and has proved himself in England at a very decent level." Ferry said he wanted to return to Scotland, due to his place in England being burgled twice.

Ferry scored on his debut for Dundee, a 4–0 win against Peterhead in the first round of the Scottish League Cup. In a follow–up match, he made his league debut for the club, in a 1–1 draw against Kilmarnock in the opening game of the season. Initially, Ferry became a first team regular in the first two months at Dundee, playing in the midfield position. After missing one match due to a knock, he returned to the first team, coming on as a 58th-minute substitute, in a 1–1 draw against Celtic on 31 August 2014. However, he suffered a knee injury that saw him out for five matches. On 22 November 2014, Ferry returned to the first team from injury, coming on as a 73rd-minute substitute, in a 2–1 loss against Celtic. However, his return was short–lived when he suffered a knee injury against Partick Thistle on 20 December 2014, as the match ended in a 1–1 draw. After the match, Ferry was out for weeks with ankle injury. On 16 January 2015, Ferry made his return from injury, coming on as a 74th-minute substitute, in a 3–3 draw against Aberdeen. However, his return was short–lived when he suffered a knee injury that saw him out for three matches. On 28 February 2015, Ferry made his return from injury, coming on as a 61st-minute substitute, in a 1–0 loss against Ross County. After missing one match, he returned to the first team from injury, starting a match and played 70 minutes before being substituted, in a 5–0 loss against Celtic on 1 May 2015. At the end of the 2014–15 season, Ferry made twenty-two appearances and scored once in all competitions.

Ahead of the 2015–16 season, manager Hartley challenged Ferry to fight for his place in the first team. He made his only appearance of the season, coming on as a 76th-minute substitute, in a 4–0 win against Kilmarnock. Shortly after, Ferry suffered an injury that kept him for the rest of August. On 31 August 2015, Ferry was released from his contract by mutual consent.

=== Peterhead ===
Following his release from Dundee, Ferry signed for Peterhead on 14 September 2015.

He made his debut for the club, starting a match and played 80 minutes before being substituted, in a 3–2 loss against Brechin City on 19 September 2015. Since joining Peterhead, Ferry became a first team regular, playing in the midfield position despite facing his own injury concerns along the way. In a match against Cowdenbeath on 26 March 2016, he suffered a knee injury and was substituted in the 41st minute, as the club loss 1–0. After missing two matches, Ferry returned to the starting line–up in the Scottish Challenge Cup final and played the whole game, in a 4–0 loss against Rangers on 10 April 2016. He played in both legs of the Scottish Championship play-offs, as Peterhead loss 6–2 on aggregate. At the end of the 2015–16 season, Ferry made twenty–eight appearances in all competitions.

At the start of the 2016–17 season, Ferry played in the first two matches of the season, both in the Scottish League Cup matches against Forfar Athletic (which he captained the side) and East Fife. After serving a three match suspension, Ferry returned to the starting line–up, in a 5–0 loss against Rangers in the last 16 of the Scottish League Cup on 9 August 2016. However, his return was short–lived when he suffered a back injury and was out for one match. On 17 September 2016, Ferry returned from injury, coming on as a 77th-minute substitute, in a 2–2 draw against Stenhousemuir. Following his return, he regained his first team place, playing in the midfield position, as well as, captain, having been appointed by Peterhead. Shortly after recovering from a groin injury, Ferry was sent–off in the 86th minute for a foul on John Carter, in a 0–0 draw against Queen’s Park on 13 November 2016. After serving a one match suspension, he returned to the starting line–up and played 61 minutes before being substituted, in a 4–2 loss against Airdrieonians on 3 December 2016. By February, Ferry suffered a back injury that saw him out for two matches. But he returned from injury, starting the whole game, in a 1–1 draw against East Fife on 25 February 2017. However, his return was short–lived due to the recurrence of his back injury. On 25 March 2017, Ferry made his return from injury, coming on as a 31st-minute substitute, in a 2–2 draw against Stranraer. He expressed his optimism of helping the club avoid relegation and stay in Scottish League One next season. However, Ferry suffered an injury and was substituted at half-time, in a 4–1 loss against Livingston on 29 April 2017. In the Scottish League One play-offs, he played two times, as Peterhead were relegated to Scottish League Two. At the end of the 2016–17 season, Ferry made thirty–four appearances in all competitions.

Ahead of the 2017–18 season, Ferry relinquished his captaincy role at Peterhead, revealing that he was uncomfortable with taking on the leadership and manager Jim McInally asked him to do it. Despite this, Ferry continued to regain his first team place, playing in the midfield position. However, he found himself placed on the substitute bench in a number of matches due to being risk from playing on the artificial pitch. During a match against Stenhousemuir on 11 November 2017, Ferry suffered a sickness on the pitch and was substituted in the 56th minute, in a 3–2 loss. But he recovered and returned to the starting line–up against Raith Rovers in the third round of the Scottish FA Cup, only for to be substituted in the 31st minute, due to injury, as the club loss 3–0. On 2 December 2017, Ferry recovered from his injury, returning to the starting line–up and played 71 minutes before being substituted, in a 3–0 win against Edinburgh City. Due to Peterhead’s good form as the 2017–18 season, he expressed optimism that the club has a good chance of earning a league title promotion to Scottish League Cup. After missing two matches, Ferry returned to the starting line–up, in a 2–1 win against Clyde on 27 February 2018. In the Scottish League One play-offs, he played three times, as Peterhead failed to get promoted to Scottish League One following a 2–1 loss on aggregate against Stenhousemuir. At the end of the 2017–18 season, Ferry made thirty–nine appearances in all competitions. Following this, he signed a contract extension with the club.

At the start of the 2018–19 season, Ferry continued to remain as a first team regular, playing in the midfield position. However, he continuously placed on the substitute bench in several matches due to being risk from playing on the artificial pitch, as well as, continuously facing his own injury concern. In a match against Berwick Rangers on 19 January 2019, Ferry suffered a knee injury and was substituted in the 79th minute, as Peterhead won 2–0. After the match, he was out for three matches. On 23 February 2019, Ferry made his return from injury, starting the whole game, in a 3–0 win against Stirling Albion. However, his return was short–lived when he suffered a back injury and was substituted at half-time, as the club loss 2–0 against Berwick Rangers on 19 March 2019. But Ferry made his return from injury, coming on as a 74th-minute substitute, in a 3–3 draw against Clyde on 6 April 2019. In the last game of the 2018–19 season against Queen's Park, he started the whole game and helped Peterhead win 2–0, resulting in the club promoted to the Scottish League One. At the end of the 2018–19 season, Ferry made thirty–six appearances in all competitions.

At the start of the 2019–20 season, Ferry continued to remain as a first team regular, playing in the midfield position. On three occasions, he remained on the substitute bench, due to his continuous risk from playing on the artificial pitch. However, Ferry continued to struggle with his injuries, including one with a groin injury sustained in a match against Montrose on 28 September 2019 and was out for a month. On 2 November 2019, he returned to the starting line–up, playing the whole game, in a 2–0 win against Raith Rovers. In a match against Clyde on 28 December 2019, he received a straight red card in the 90th minute following a heated exchange between players from both teams. After the match, Peterhead unsuccessfully appealed for his red card and didn’t play for five matches. While on the sidelines, he signed a new contract with the club for another season. On 22 February 2020, Ferry returned to the starting line–up, in a 2–0 loss against Airdrieonians. The season was soon curtailed because of the COVID-19 pandemic, with the club only received 29 points. At the end of the 2019–20 season, he went on to make twenty–one appearances in all competitions. Following this, Ferry contributed to Peterhead’s group to discuss the necessary reductions with the club’s owner Rodger Morrison over the wages.

Despite suffering a knock in Peterhead’s pre–season tour ahead of the 2020–21 season, Ferry recovered and played in the centre–back position, in a 1–0 win against Dundee United in the group stage of the Scottish League Cup. In a match against Airdrieonians on 17 October 2020, he suffered a hamstring injury and was substituted in the 32nd minute, in a 2–0 loss. After the match, Ferry was out for two matches. On 10 November 2020, he returned from injury, coming on as a 63rd-minute substitute, against Kelty Hearts in the group stage of the Scottish League Cup and helped the club win 5–4 on penalties following a 1–1 draw. However, Ferry’s return was short–lived when he suffered another hamstring injury and was substituted in the 13th minute, in a 1–0 win against Dumbarton on 21 November 2020. After the match, Ferry was out for three matches. On 19 December 2020, he returned to the starting line–up, playing the whole game, in a 1–0 win against Partick Thistle. In a match against Cove Rangers on 2 January 2021, Ferry played in the centre–back position, only for him to receive a straight red card for a foul on Mitch Megginson in the 22nd minute, in a 1–0 loss. After serving a two match suspension following an unsuccessful appeal, he returned to the starting line–up and played 76 minutes before being substituted, in a 1–0 win against Dumbarton on 27 March 2021. Following his return from suspension, Ferry regained his first team place for the rest of the season. At the end of the 2020–21 season, he made seventeen appearances in all competitions. Following this, Ferry signed a contract extension with Peterhead, keeping him until 2022.

In the first match of the 2021–22 season saw Ferry suffered a broken rib, but he started in a match against Hearts in the Scottish League Cup, losing 2–0. In a match against Falkirk on 7 August 2021, however, Ferry suffered an Achilles injury and was substituted in the 52nd minute, in a 2–0 loss. After missing one match, he returned to the first team from injury, starting a match and played 71 minutes before being substituted, in a 3–2 loss against Airdrieonians on 21 August 2021. Following his return from injury, Ferry started in the next seven matches for Peterhead. However, in a match against Falkirk on 23 October 2021, he suffered a hamstring injury and was substituted in the 15th minute, in a 0–0 draw. After missing two matches, Ferry returned to the first team from injury, starting a match, only for him to be substituted in the 3rd minute of the match, due to an ankle injury, in 3–0 loss against Cove Rangers on 13 November 2021. On 11 December 2021, he returned to the first team from injury, starting a match, only for him to be substituted in the 27th minute once again, due to a back injury, in a 1–1 draw against East Fife. After missing three matches, Ferry returned to the first team from injury, starting a match, only for him to be substituted in the 34th minute, due to a back injury, in a 1–1 draw against Clyde on 15 January 2022. But he quickly recovered and returned to the starting line–up, playing 120 minutes against East Kilbride in the fourth round of the Scottish Cup, as the match ended up in a 2–2 draw and the club won 5–4 in a shootout to advance to the next round. However, his return was short–lived once again when Ferry suffered a back injury that saw him out for a month. On 26 March 2022, he returned to the starting line–up and played 83 minutes before being substituted, in a 1–0 win against Falkirk. After missing one match due to a calf injury, Ferry returned to the starting line–up, in a 2–1 win against Queens Park on 16 April 2022. He also scored an own goal for Airdrieonians in his final game for Peterhead, leading to a 1–1 draw in the last game of the season. At the end of the 2021–22 season, Ferry made twenty–three appearances in all competitions.

Throughout the 2021–22 season, Ferry continuously plagued with injuries. Despite this, he was named the Chairman’s Awards at the club’s awards ceremony. It was announced on 23 April 2022 that Ferry would be leaving Peterhead at the end of the 2021–22 season.

== International career ==
In October 2004, Ferry was called up to the Scotland U17’s squad for the first time.

Ferry played for the Scotland U19 squad and scored four times in the UEFA European Under-19 Championship’s qualifiers that saw the U19 side qualify for the tournament in Poland. He was then called up to the UEFA European Under-19 Championship squad. Ferry started all five matches in the tournament, as Scotland U19 went on to reach the UEFA European Under-19 Championship final. The Scottish team reached the final, in which he played, but they lost to Spain. Ferry went on to make nine appearances for Scotland U19.

In January 2007, Ferry was called up to the Scotland U21 for the first time. Due to injury, he missed the FIFA Under-20 World Cup in Canada. Two years later, Ferry was called up to the Scotland U21 but he did not play. Ferry acknowledged that he won’t get a call–up from the senior squad.

== Post retirement ==
During his time at Peterhead, Ferry worked as the first team coach under manager Jim McInally, as well as a youth coach for Celtic. His coaching at Peterhead expanded after he signed a contract with the club in January 2020. In June 2021, Ferry rejected an opportunity to join Kevin Thomson’s Kelty Hearts as part of his coaching staff.

In May 2022, after Ferry's entertainment brand Open Goal agreed a partnership with the club, Ferry was announced as the manager of Lowland League side Broomhill. In March 2023, it was announced that Ferry and Open Goal would split ties with Broomhill at the end of the season.

On 22 April 2023, Ferry was named as the new assistant manager of Lowland League club East Kilbride for the following season under manager Mick Kennedy. He was part of the coaching staff who contributed to the club as champions in both 2023–24 season and 2024–25 season. He became manager in October 2026 after Kennedy resigned to continue his UEFA studies, while remaining part of the support staff.

=== Media career ===
Ferry hosts an interview segment on Open Goal's YouTube channel. Titled Si Ferry Meets..., he has interviewed football players and managers such as Andy Robertson, Ally McCoist, John Hartson, Barry Ferguson, David Moyes, David Marshall, Ian Durrant, Leigh Griffiths, Kenny Miller, Jamie Carragher, Jonathan Woodgate and Gordon Strachan. Ferry also hosts Open Goal's Keeping the Ball on the Ground, discussing Scottish football with former professional footballers Kevin Kyle, Derek Ferguson, Frank McAvennie and Paul Slane, along with active player Andy Halliday, with guest appearances from other Scottish football and cultural personalities.

In September 2020, Ferry became a columnist for the Glasgow Times.

== Personal life ==
During his time at Swindon Town, both Ferry and teammate Paul Caddis took part in men’s charity Movember for the Tommy Burns's Skin Cancer Trust. He considered Burns as a hero of his "who wanted him to be a better person as much as a better footballer".

Ferry is married and has two sons. In June 2025, Ferry announced that he would be opening a New York-style Italian restaurant called Grosso Glasgow in Glasgow, which he stated was inspired by a Swindon institution. Three months later, it was officially opened.

== Career statistics ==
As of match played 30 April 2022

Appearances and goals by club, season and competition
Club	Season	League			National Cup		League Cup		Other		Total	
Club	Season	Division	Apps	Goals	Apps	Goals	Apps	Goals	Apps	Goals	Apps	Goals
Celtic	2009–10	Scottish Premier League	0	0	0	0	0	0	0	0	0	0
Swindon (loan)	2009–10	Football League One	42	2	3	0	0	0	1 (Note: Appearance in League One play-offs)	0	46	2
Swindon	2010–11	Football League One	21	0	1	0	1	0	2 (Note: Appearance in Football League Trophy)	0	25	0
Swindon	2011–12	Football League Two	44	1	3	1	2	0	5	0	54	2
Swindon	2012–13	Football League One	42	5	1	0	4	0	3 (Note: One appearance in Football League Trophy and two in League One play-offs)	0	50	5
Swindon	Total		149	8	8	1	7	0	11	0	175	9
Portsmouth	2013–14	Football League Two	20	1	0	0	1	0	1	0	22	1
Dundee	2014–15	Scottish Premiership	19	0	1	0	2	1	0	0	22	1
Dundee	2015–16	Scottish Premiership	1	0	0	0	0	0	0	0	1	0
Dundee	Total		20	0	1	0	2	1	0	0	23	1
Peterhead	2015–16	Scottish League One	24	0	1	0	0	0	3 (Note: One appearance in Scottish Challenge Cup and two in Scottish Championship play-offs)	0	28	0
Peterhead	2016–17	Scottish League One	28	0	1	0	3	0	2 (Note: Appearances in Scottish League One play-offs)	0	34	0
Peterhead	2017–18	Scottish League Two	27	0	1	0	4	0	5 (Note: Three appearances in Scottish League One play-offs & two in Scottish Challenge Cup)	0	37	0
Peterhead	2018–19	Scottish League Two	28	0	3	0	4	0	1 (Note: Appearances in Scottish Challenge Cup)	0	36	0
Peterhead	2019–20	Scottish League One	17	0	1	0	3	0	0	0	21	0
Peterhead	2020–21	Scottish League One	13	0	0	0	4	0	0	0	17	0
Peterhead	2021–22	Scottish League One	19	0	1	0	3	0	0	0	23	0
Peterhead	Total		156	0	8	0	21	0	11	0	196	0
Career total			345	9	17	1	27	1	23	0	416	11

== Managerial statistics ==
As of match played

Managerial record by team and tenure
Team	Nat	From	To	Record					Ref.
Team	Nat	From	To	G	W	D	L	Win %	Ref.
Broomhill	(Scotland)	May 2022	April 2023	36	15	6	15	41.67	
East Kilbride	(Scotland)	29 October 2026	present	3	2	0	1	66.67	

== Honours ==
Swindon Town

- Football League Two: 2011–12
- Football League Trophy runner-up: 2011–12

Peterhead

- Scottish League Two: 2018–19
