= Kostadin Gadzhalov =

Bulgarian footballer

Personal information
- Full name: Kostadin Veselinov Gadzhalov
- Date of birth: 20 June 1989 (age 37)
- Place of birth: Rudozem, Bulgaria
- Height: 1.86 m (6 ft 1 in)
- Position: Centre-back

Youth career
- Botev Plovdiv

Senior career*
Years	Team	Apps	(Gls)
2007–2009	Botev Plovdiv	20	(1)
2010	Lokomotiv Plovdiv	14	(0)
2010	Borac Čačak	0	(0)
2011	Botev Plovdiv	14	(0)
2012	Bdin	10	(0)
2012	Etar 1924	9	(0)
2013–2014	Dobrudzha Dobrich	38	(0)
2015–2018	Dundee	40	(3)
2018	→ Brechin City (loan)	2	(0)
2018–2019	Botev Vratsa	6	(0)
2019–2020	Montana	12	(0)
2020–2023	Yantra Gabrovo	62	(0)
2023	Levski Karlovo		
Total		227	(4)

International career
2007–2008	Bulgaria U19	4	(0)
2008–2009	Bulgaria U21		
- * Club domestic league appearances and goals

Kostadin Gadzhalov (Bulgarian: Костадин Гаджалов; born 20 June 1989) is a Bulgarian former professional footballer who played as a centre-back. He was raised in Botev Plovdiv's youth teams. After a 16-year pro career spent largely in his native Bulgaria, Gadzhalov is perhaps most notable for his stint in Scotland with Dundee.

== Career ==
Gadzhalov joined Botev Plovdiv at an early age and progressed through the club's youth system. He made his first-team debut on 11 November. 2007, when he came on as a substitute to replace Todor Timonov in a 2–0 away league loss against CSKA Sofia. Gadzhalov scored his first goal on 31 May 2009, in a 3–1 home win over Vihren Sandanski. In July 2009, he left the club due to financial reasons.

On 15 January 2010, after six months without playing, Gadzhalov signed with Lokomotiv Plovdiv on a two-and-a-half-year deal. However, he ended up released in the following summer. He joined the Serbian side FK Borac Čačak in summer 2010 but failed to make an official appearance. Shortly afterwards, he left the club and returned to Bulgaria.

On 3 January 2015, following a successful short trial period, Gadzhalov signed for the Scottish side Dundee as a free agent. He made his debut for Dundee in the Scottish Premiership, playing the full 90 minutes in the 4–1 home win over Motherwell on 10 January. Gadzhalov scored the first goal for Dundee in the "Get Doon Derby" against rivals Dundee United on 2 May 2016, an absolute thundertwat of a header into the top bins following a corner kick. Dundee went on to win the Derby 2–1 at Dens Park, relegating Dundee United to the Scottish Championship.

Gadzhalov joined Brechin City on a one-month emergency loan deal in February 2018. He was released by Dundee at the end of the 2017/18 season.

In July 2018, Gadzhalov signed with Botev Vratsa.

After signing with Yantra Gabrovo in 2020, Gadzhalov would play 2 1/2 seasons with them and would captain the side. He left the team on 16 January 2023 in order to spend more time with his young family in Plovdiv. He would join Levski Karlovo soon after before shortly retiring.

== International career ==
Gadzhalov represented the Bulgarian team at the 2008 UEFA European Under-19 Championship, where he played full games in the group stage against Hungary and Spain.

In October 2008, the Bulgarian national under-21 coach Ivan Kolev called Gadzhalov up for Bulgaria national under-21 football team for a friendly matches with Greece U21 and Macedonia U21.

== Career statistics ==
As of match played 4 November 2017

Appearances and goals by club, season and competition
Club	Season	League			Cup		League Cup		Continental		Total	
Club	Season	Division	Apps	Goals	Apps	Goals	Apps	Goals	Apps	Goals	Apps	Goals
Botev Plovdiv	2007–08	A Group	8	0	1	0	–		–		9	0
Botev Plovdiv	2008–09	A Group	12	1	0	0	–		–		12	1
Botev Plovdiv	Total		20	1	1	0	0	0	0	0	21	1
Lokomotiv Plovdiv	2009–10	A Group	5	0	0	0	–		–		5	0
Lokomotiv Plovdiv	2010–11	A Group	9	0	0	0	–		–		9	0
Lokomotiv Plovdiv	Total		14	0	0	0	0	0	0	0	14	0
Borac Čačak	2010–11	SuperLiga	0	0	0	0	–		–		0	0
Borac Čačak	Total		0	0	0	0	0	0	0	0	0	0
Botev Plovdiv	2011–12	B Group	14	0	2	0	–		–		16	0
Bdin Vidin	2011–12	B Group	10	0	0	0	–		–		10	0
Etar 1924	2012–13	А Group	9	0	2	0	–		–		11	0
Dobrudzha Dobrich	2013–14	B Group	24	0	5	0	–		–		29	0
Dobrudzha Dobrich	2014–15	B Group	14	0	1	0	–		–		15	0
Dobrudzha Dobrich	Total		38	0	6	0	0	0	0	0	44	0
Dundee	2014–15	Scottish Premiership	8	0	1	0	0	0	–		9	0
Dundee	2015–16	Scottish Premiership	14	1	2	0	0	0	–		16	1
Dundee	2016–17	Scottish Premiership	18	2	1	0	0	0	–		19	2
Dundee	2017–18	Scottish Premiership	0	0	0	0	0	0	–		0	0
Dundee	Total		40	3	4	0	0	0	0	0	44	3
Career total			145	4	15	0	0	0	0	0	160	4
