= Philip Roberts =

Irish footballer (born 1994)

Personal information
- Full name: Philip Anthony Roberts
- Date of birth: 7 April 1994 (age 32)
- Place of birth: Newham, London, England
- Height: 1.80 m (5 ft 11 in)
- Position: Striker

Youth career
- –2010: Norwich City
- 2010–2012: Arsenal

Senior career*
Years	Team	Apps	(Gls)
2012–2013	Arsenal	0	(0)
2012–2013	→ Inverness Caledonian Thistle (loan)	17	(1)
2013–2014	Falkirk	26	(5)
2014–2015	Dundee	8	(0)
2015	→ Alloa Athletic (loan)	7	(0)
2016	Sligo Rovers	19	(2)
2017	Chelmsford City	0	(0)
2017	→ Chesham United (loan)	11	(1)
2017–2018	Braintree Town	30	(17)
2018	Chelmsford City	6	(1)
2018	Hemel Hempstead Town	11	(5)
2018–2019	Dartford	17	(8)
2019	Wealdstone	6	(0)
2019	Hayes & Yeading United	3	(0)
2019	Romford	2	(1)
2020	Welling United	9	(0)
2020	Brentwood Town	1	(0)
2020–2021	Chelmsford City	9	(0)
2021–2022	Tilbury	6	(2)
2023	Margate	25	(5)

International career
2009–2011	Republic of Ireland U17	5	(4)
2011	Republic of Ireland U19	2	(0)
- * Club domestic league appearances and goals as of 16:03, 5 December 2023 (UTC)

Philip James Roberts (born 7 April 1994) is an Irish footballer who last played for Margate. He began his career at Arsenal, although he never made an appearance for the club. He spent time on loan at Inverness Caledonian Thistle, then signed for Falkirk. He signed for Dundee in the summer of 2014 and spent the second half of the 2014–15 season on loan at Alloa Athletic.

== Early life ==
Born in the London Borough of Newham, Roberts attended Ilford County High School in Barkingside, Ilford from the years of 11–16. He has a sister called Lauren – attending Woodford County, and a younger brother called Chris. His cousin, Sean Roberts is a semi-professional footballer who has played for North Greenford Utd, Thamesmead Town, VCD Athletic A.F.C. Hornchurch, and is who plays for Cray Wanderers, Philip played at youth levels for Charlton before being released, having been on trial at Liverpool he eventually ended up playing for Norwich featuring for their U18 team at the age of 16.

== Club career ==
=== Arsenal ===
Roberts joined Arsenal on 3 June 2010, from Norwich City on scholarship terms. Robert's first season at the club went well as he scored four goals in 15 appearances at the under-18s level for Arsenal. He then followed that up during the 2011–12 season scoring nine goals in only 23 matches for the under-18s and becoming the top scorer among the Arsenal under-18s and he made four appearances for the reserves, scoring 1 goal in the process against Wolverhampton Wanderers. At the start of the 2012–13 season he joined Inverness on loan. Phillips was released by Arsenal at the end of the 2012–13 season.

==== Inverness CT (loan) ====
On 30 August 2012, Roberts signed a loan deal with Scottish Premier League side Inverness Caledonian Thistle until January 2013. On 22 September, he made his professional debut for Inverness in the Scottish Premier League against Hibernian coming on as a 71st-minute substitute for Conor Pepper as Inverness drew 2–2. Seven days later, he scored his first professional goal and provided assist for Richie Foran in a 4–0 win over Dundee United. After the match, Roberts says he couldn't ask for more after his performance. On 24 November 2012, Roberts set up a goal for Billy McKay -who scored the only goal in the game – as Inverness beat Celtic 1–0. On 7 December 2012, Roberts loan spell was extended until the end of the season. In the semi-final of Scottish League Cup against Hearts, which was 1–1 draw and led to penalties shoot-out, Roberts missed the vital penalty when he shot and blazed over the bar in front of Inverness fans, allowing Hearts to go to the final. Opposition goalkeeper Jamie MacDonald claims he spooked Roberts, causing him miss the penalty.

=== Falkirk ===
Following his release from Arsenal, Roberts went on trial with League Two side, Wycombe Wanderers, scoring two goals in a pre-season friendly at Farnborough before the match was abandoned after the pitch was dangerous to play.

On 26 July 2013, Roberts return to Scotland, again, by joining Scottish Championship side Falkirk after playing as a trialist. Roberts joined Manager Gary Holt, who knew him from his time at Norwich City and signed a two-year contract, subjected to international clearance. The next day, on 27 July 2013, Roberts made his Falkirk's debut, in the first round of the Ramsdens Cup, in a 2–1 win over Clyde. Roberts continued to make an impressive display with the club, including scoring a hat-trick in a 3–0 win over Livingston on 24 August 2013. Since then, Roberts struggled to make a goal-scoring form, having been overshadowed by his striking partner, Rory Loy.

On 23 March 2014, Roberts was sent off in a game against Alloa Athletic, a game in which Falkirk lost 3–0. Roberts was involved in an incident with Alloa's Michael Doyle, which led to Roberts' sending off. As a result of his sending off, Roberts was given a six match ban and this would lead the club making an "investigation the manner in line with its disciplinary procedures". This was to be his last appearance in a Falkirk shirt, and his contract was cancelled by mutual consent.

As a result of the incident, Roberts and Holt had a falling out, with Holt making criticism towards Roberts by describing his behavior as "cowardly". Roberts responded his comment as "harsh".

=== Dundee ===
Dundee, who had been promoted to the Scottish Premiership, signed Roberts on 8 May 2014. After the move, Roberts says joining the club was an easy decision to make following discussions with manager Paul Hartley. He made his debut on 26 August 2014, as Dundee beat Raith Rovers 4–0 in the Scottish League Cup. Having served four league matches at the start of the season, Roberts made his Dundee debut, where he provided an assist for James McPake, in a 1–1 draw against Celtic on 31 August 2014.

On 2 February 2015, Roberts moved on loan to Scottish Championship side Alloa Athletic until the end of the 2014–15 season. Roberts made his Alloa Athletic debut on 14 February 2015, where he made his first start, in a 1–0 loss against Queen of the South. After making seven appearances for the club, his loan spell at Alloa Athletic came to an end in early-May.

On 28 August 2015, Roberts was informed by Paul Hartley that he was no longer part of the club's plans, with his contract being terminated by mutual consent the same day.

=== Sligo Rovers ===
On 22 February 2016, Roberts signed for Sligo Rovers in the League of Ireland Premier Division.

=== Return to England ===
On 11 January 2017, Roberts returned to England, signing for non-league club Chelmsford City. On 22 February 2017, after failing to break through into Chelmsford's first team, Roberts was loaned to Chesham United. Roberts signed for rivals Braintree Town ahead of the 2017–18 season. In February 2018, after scoring 17 league goals for Braintree, Roberts returned to Chelmsford, scoring one goal in six league appearances in his second spell at the club.

The following season, Roberts signed for Hemel Hempstead Town, before signing for Dartford. In April 2019, Dartford confirmed the departure of Roberts, after eight goals in 17 appearances, after failing to turn up for Dartford's eventual 3–1 defeat to Weston-super-Mare. In August 2019, Roberts signed for Wealdstone. On 12 January 2020, following short spells with Hayes & Yeading United and Romford, Roberts signed for Welling United.

On 2 October 2020, after a short spell with Brentwood Town, Roberts returned to Chelmsford for a third spell at the club. On 12 February 2021, Chelmsford manager Robbie Simpson confirmed Roberts' departure from the club.

In August 2021, Roberts signed for Isthmian League North Division side Tilbury. Between January 2023 and December 2023, Roberts featured for Margate, becoming a player-coach ahead of the 2023–24 season.

== International career ==
Roberts is eligible to play for the Republic of Ireland through his parents as well as England and Jamaica. Roberts made his Republic of Ireland U17 debut against the Czech Republic U17s in 2009, coming on with the score 1–1 before giving the Republic of Ireland the lead.

== Career statistics ==
As of match played 2 December 2023

Appearances and goals by club, season and competition
Club	Season	League			National Cup		League Cup		Other		Total	
Club	Season	Division	Apps	Goals	Apps	Goals	Apps	Goals	Apps	Goals	Apps	Goals
Arsenal	2012–13	Premier League	0	0	0	0	0	0	0	0	0	0
Inverness Caledonian Thistle (loan)	2012–13	Scottish Premier League	17	1	3	0	3	0	—		23	1
Falkirk	2013–14	Scottish Championship	26	5	1	0	3	1	2 (Note: Appearances in the Scottish Challenge Cup)	0	32	6
Dundee	2014–15	Scottish Premiership	8	0	0	0	2	0	—		10	0
Dundee	2015–16	Scottish Premiership	0	0	0	0	0	0	—		0	0
Dundee	Total		8	0	0	0	2	0	—		10	0
Alloa Athletic (loan)	2014–15	Scottish Championship	7	0	0	0	0	0	0	0	7	0
Sligo Rovers	2016	League of Ireland Premier Division	19	2	0	0	1	0	—		20	2
Chelmsford City	2016–17	National League South	0	0	0	0	—		2 (Note: Appearances in the FA Trophy)	0	2	0
Chesham United (dual reg.)	2016–17	Southern League Premier Division	11	1	0	0	—		0	0	11	1
Braintree Town	2017–18	National League South	30	17	2	1	—		2	0	34	18
Chelmsford City	2017–18	National League South	6	1	—		—		1 (Note: Appearances in the National League South play-offs)	0	7	1
Hemel Hempstead Town	2018–19	National League South	11	5	0	0	—		0	0	11	5
Dartford	2018–19	National League South	17	8	0	0	—		0	0	17	8
Wealdstone	2019–20	National League South	6	0	0	0	—		0	0	6	0
Hayes & Yeading United	2019–20	Southern League Premier Division South	3	0	2	0	—		0	0	5	0
Romford	2019–20	Isthmian League North Division	2	1	0	0	—		0	0	2	1
Welling United	2019–20	National League South	9	0	0	0	—		0	0	9	0
Brentwood Town	2020–21	Isthmian League North Division	1	0	1	0	—		0	0	2	0
Chelmsford City	2020–21	National League South	9	0	—		—		1	0	10	0
Tilbury	2021–22	Isthmian League North Division	6	2	1	1	—		1	0	8	3
Margate	2022–23	Isthmian League Premier Division	14	2	—		—		0	0	14	2
Margate	2023–24	Isthmian League Premier Division	11	3	3	0	—		0	0	14	3
Margate	Total		25	5	3	0	0	0	0	0	28	5
Career total			213	48	13	2	9	1	9	0	245	51
