= Andrew Black (footballer, born 1995) =

Scottish footballer

Personal information
- Full name: Andrew Scott Black
- Date of birth: 20 September 1995 (age 31)
- Place of birth: Livingston, Scotland
- Height: 1.78 m (5 ft 10 in)
- Position: Midfielder

Team information
- Current team: Gartcairn Juniors

Youth career
- Hibernian

Senior career*
Years	Team	Apps	(Gls)
2014–2016	Dundee	2	(0)
2015–2016	→ Forfar Athletic (loan)	14	(0)
2016–2017	Fauldhouse United		
2017–2018	Stirling Albion	37	(0)
2018–2021	Edinburgh City	49	(0)
2021–2022	Kelty Hearts	22	(0)
2022	East Kilbride	13	(0)
2022–2023	Cowdenbeath	5	(0)
2023	Berwick Rangers	0	(0)
2023–	Gartcairn Juniors		
- * Club domestic league appearances and goals as of 5 August 2023

Andrew Scott Black (born 20 September 1995) is a Scottish footballer who used to play as a midfielder for West of Scotland League First Division club Gartcairn Juniors.

He has previously played for Dundee, Forfar Athletic, Fauldhouse United, Stirling Albion, Edinburgh City, Kelty Hearts, East Kilbride and Cowdenbeath.

== Career ==
Black was with Hibernian as a youth, then moved to Dundee. He made his first professional appearance on 7 February 2015, coming on as a substitute for Dundee in a Scottish Cup tie against Celtic.

On 26 August 2015, Black moved on loan to Forfar Athletic until January 2016. Black was released by Dundee on 31 August 2016.

After stints with Fauldhouse United and Stirling Albion, Black signed for Edinburgh City in June 2018.

Kelty Hearts announced the signing of Black on 3 June 2021.

== Career statistics ==
As of 17 July 2016

Club	Season	League		Cup		League Cup		Other		Total	
Club	Season	Apps	Goals	Apps	Goals	Apps	Goals	Apps	Goals	Apps	Goals
Dundee	2014–15	1	0	1	0	0	0	0	0	2	0
Dundee	2015–16	1	0	0	0	0	0	0	0	1	0
Dundee	2016–17	0	0	0	0	0	0	0	0	0	0
Dundee	Total	2	0	1	0	0	0	0	0	3	0
Forfar Athletic (loan)	2015–16	14	0	0	0	0	0	0	0	14	0
Career total		16	0	1	0	0	0	0	0	17	0
