= Scott Bain =

Scottish footballer (born 1991)

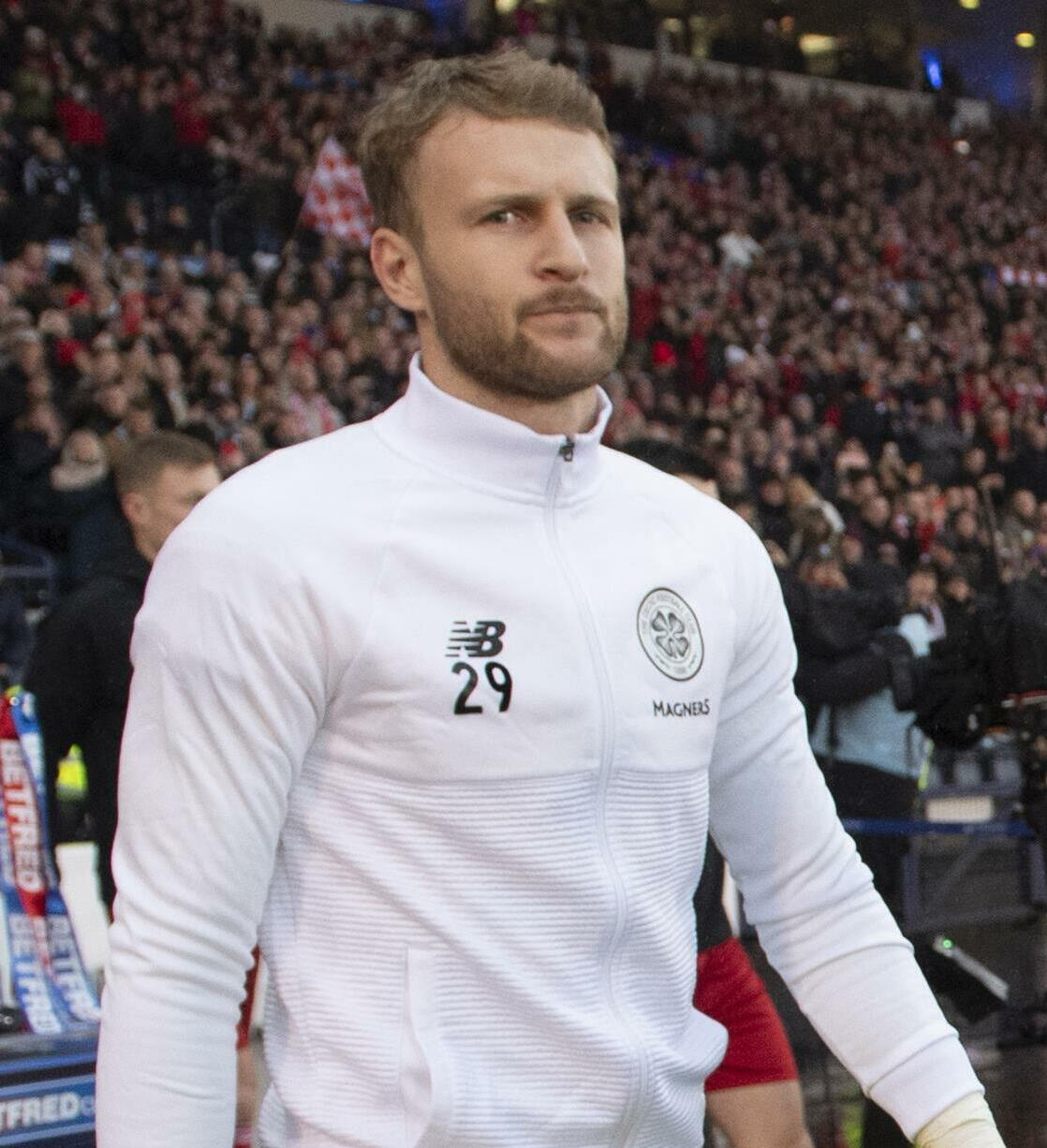
- Bain with Celtic at the 2018 Scottish League Cup Final

Personal information
- Full name: Scott Bain
- Date of birth: 22 November 1991 (age 34)
- Place of birth: Edinburgh, Scotland
- Height: 1.83 m (6 ft 0 in)
- Position: Goalkeeper

Team information
- Current team: Falkirk
- Number: 19

Youth career
- 2008–2010: Aberdeen

Senior career*
Years	Team	Apps	(Gls)
2010–2011	Aberdeen	0	(0)
2010–2011	→ Elgin City (loan)	11	(0)
2011–2014	Alloa Athletic	100	(0)
2014–2018	Dundee	108	(0)
2018	→ Hibernian (loan)	0	(0)
2018	→ Celtic (loan)	7	(0)
2018–2025	Celtic	46	(0)
2025–	Falkirk	45	(0)

International career^{‡}
2010	Scotland U-19	1	(0)
2018–	Scotland	4	(0)
- * Club domestic league appearances and goals as of 8 November 2026 ‡ National team caps and goals as of 8 November 2026

Scott Bain (born 22 November 1991) is a Scottish professional footballer who plays as a goalkeeper for Scottish Premiership club Falkirk and the Scotland national team. Bain is an Aberdeen youth product, although never played in a competitive first team Aberdeen game. After playing on loan at Elgin City, he played more than 100 games for each of Alloa Athletic and Dundee. He then played 78 games during a trophy-laden seven-year spell at Celtic, winning 14 major honours to become the most decorated goalkeeper in the club’s history.

Bain has played four times for the Scotland national team.

== Club career ==
=== Aberdeen ===
Bain began his footballing career at Aberdeen's academy. Shortly after his promotion to the first team, he was loaned to Elgin City, where he made his professional debut. In May 2011, Bain was released by Aberdeen.

=== Alloa Athletic ===
In June 2011, Bain signed a one-year contract with Scottish Third Division side Alloa Athletic. He established himself as a first-team regular, and helped the club to consecutive promotions in his first two seasons.

=== Dundee ===
On 29 May 2014, Bain signed a three-year contract with Dundee. He made his debut on 26 August 2014, in a 4–0 win against Raith Rovers in the Scottish League Cup. Bain made a first league appearance for Dundee in October 2014, when Kyle Letheren was injured during a pre-match exercise. On 6 April 2015, he signed a new contract with Dundee, extending his deal with the club until 2018. Bain was dropped from the Dundee first team squad by manager Neil McCann in November 2017, for unspecified disciplinary reasons.

==== Hibernian (loan) ====
On 1 January 2018, it was announced that Bain had joined Hibernian on loan until the end of the 2017–18 season. Hibernian cancelled the loan on 31 January, which allowed Bain to join Celtic instead.

=== Celtic ===
Bain joined Celtic on 31 January 2018, initially on loan from Dundee. Celtic needed another goalkeeper to provide competition for Dorus de Vries, following an injury to Craig Gordon. Bain made his first appearance for Celtic on 11 March, in a 3–2 win against Rangers, after de Vries suffered an injury in training.

With his contract with Dundee due to expire at the end of the 2017–18 season, Bain signed a four-year contract with Celtic in May 2018. Bain played regularly for Celtic after the January 2019 winter break.

In October 2019, he signed a one-year contract with the club.

His last game for Celtic was a 3–2 league home win against St Mirren on 18 May 2024. After failing to make a first team appearance during the 2024–25 season and just earning eight such appearances in total in the previous three seasons, Bain was released by Celtic at the end of the season.

=== Falkirk ===
On 3 June 2025, Bain signed a one-year deal with Falkirk.

On 9 January 2026, Bain signed a two-year contract extension at Falkirk, with the option of an additional year; keeping him at the Falkirk Stadium until at least June 2028.

== International career ==
Due to an injury to Allan McGregor, Scotland manager Gordon Strachan called Bain into the national squad for a friendly with Qatar and a UEFA Euro 2016 qualifying match with the Republic of Ireland in June 2015.

Bain was recalled to the squad in May 2018 for friendly matches against Peru and Mexico, after McGregor again dropped out through injury. He made his first full international appearance on 2 June 2018, in a 1–0 defeat against Mexico. His second cap came in a 3–0 defeat against Kazakhstan on 21 March 2019 in Euro 2020 qualification.

Bain was recalled to the international squad in November 2025, six years since his last call-up. He finally gained his first cap of Steve Clarke's time as Scotland boss when he came on as a half-time substitute in a friendly against the Ivory Coast at the Hill Dickinson Stadium on 31 March 2026. Bain made an impressive save from Amad Diallo as the Scots lost 1-0.

== Career statistics ==
As of 19 September 2026

Appearances and goals by club, season and competition
Club	Season	League			Scottish Cup		League Cup		Europe		Other		Total	
Club	Season	Division	Apps	Goals	Apps	Goals	Apps	Goals	Apps	Goals	Apps	Goals	Apps	Goals
Aberdeen	2010–11	Scottish Premier League	—		—		—		—		—		—	
Elgin City (loan)	2010–11	Scottish Third Division	11	0	—		—		—		—		11	0
Alloa Athletic	2011–12	Scottish Third Division	30	0	2	0	1	0	—		1 (Note: Appearances in the Scottish Challenge Cup)	0	34	0
Alloa Athletic	2012–13	Scottish Second Division	35	0	1	0	1	0	—		5 (Note: One appearance in the Scottish Challenge Cup and four in the First Division play-offs)	0	42	0
Alloa Athletic	2013–14	Scottish Championship	35	0	3	0	2	0	—		1	0	43	0
Alloa Athletic	Total		100	0	6	0	4	0	—		7	0	117	0
Dundee	2014–15	Scottish Premiership	23 (Note: Includes one appearance not recorded on Soccerway or Soccerbase, as Kyle Letheren was injured during pre-match exercises.)	0	2	0	1	0	—		—		26	0
Dundee	2015–16	Scottish Premiership	37	0	4	0	1	0	—		—		42	0
Dundee	2016–17	Scottish Premiership	36	0	1	0	2	0	—		—		39	0
Dundee	2017–18	Scottish Premiership	12	0	0	0	6	0	—		—		18	0
Dundee	Total		108	0	7	0	10	0	—		—		125	0
Hibernian (loan)	2017–18	Scottish Premiership	0	0	—		—		—		—		—	
Celtic (loan)	2017–18	Scottish Premiership	7	0	—		—		—		—		7	0
Celtic	2018–19	Scottish Premiership	20	0	5	0	4	0	2	0	—		31	0
Celtic	2019–20	Scottish Premiership	2	0	2	0	0	0	5	0	—		9	0
Celtic	2020–21	Scottish Premiership	18	0	2	0	0	0	3	0	—		23	0
Celtic	2021–22	Scottish Premiership	2	0	0	0	0	0	2	0	—		4	0
Celtic	2022–23	Scottish Premiership	1	0	0	0	0	0	0	0	—		1	0
Celtic	2023–24	Scottish Premiership	3	0	0	0	0	0	0	0	—		3	0
Celtic	2024–25	Scottish Premiership	0	0	0	0	0	0	0	0	—		0	0
Celtic	Total		53	0	9	0	4	0	12	0	—		78	0
Falkirk	2025–26	Scottish Premiership	32	0	4	0	3	0	—		0	0	39	0
Falkirk	2026–27	Scottish Premiership	7	0	0	0	0	0	—		0	0	7	0
Falkirk	Total		37	0	4	0	3	0	0	0	0	0	44	0
Career total			311	0	26	0	21	0	12	0	7	0	377	0

== Honours ==
Alloa Athletic

- Scottish Third Division (1): 2011–12

Celtic

- Scottish Premiership (7): 2017–18, 2018–19, 2019–20, 2021–22, 2022–23, 2023–24, 2024–25
- Scottish Cup (3): 2017–18, 2018–19, 2023–24
- Scottish League Cup (3): 2018–19, 2021–22, 2022–23,
