= Kyle Letheren =

Welsh footballer (born 1987)

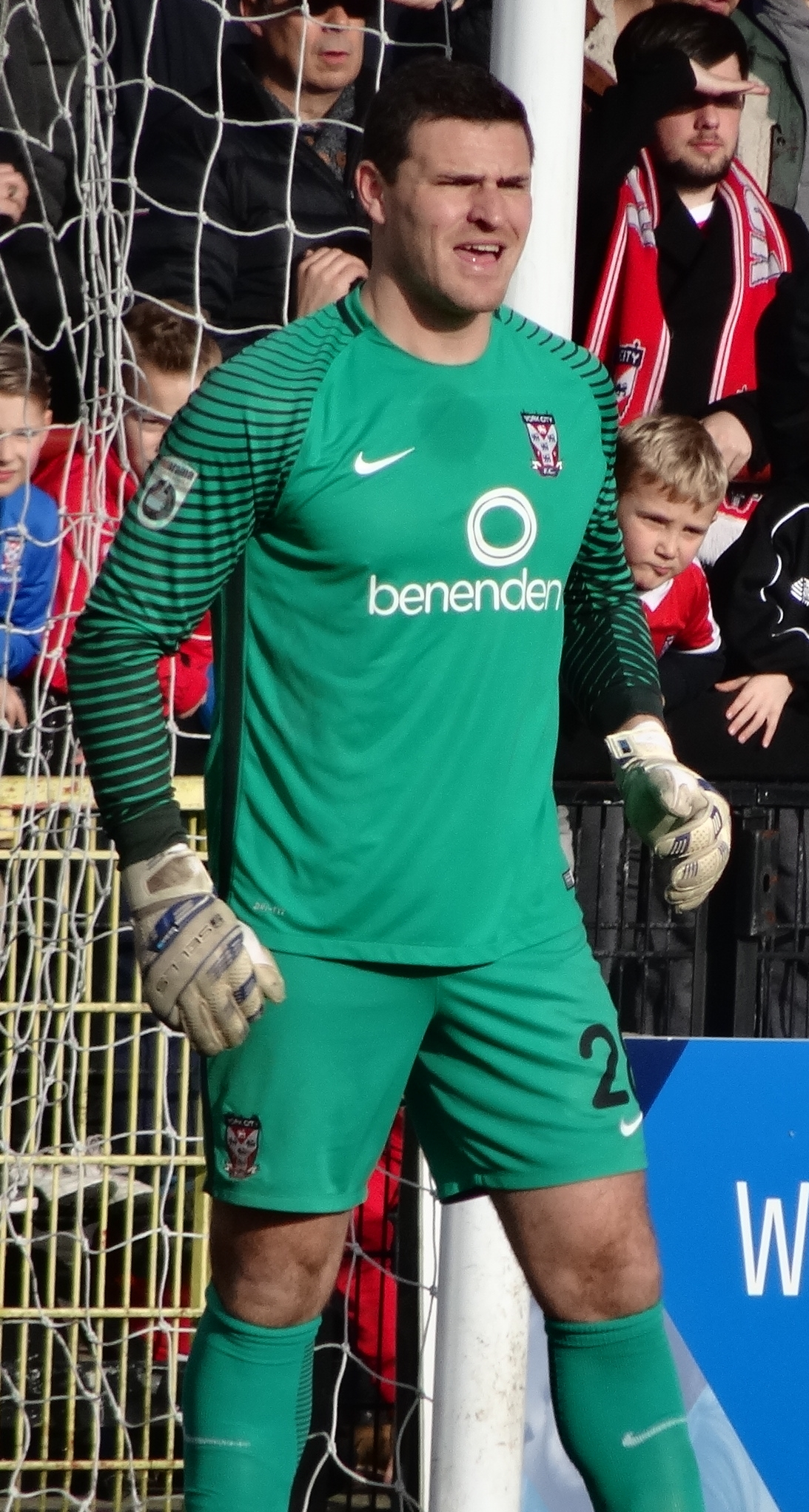
- Letheren playing for York City in 2017

Personal information
- Full name: Kyle Charles Letheren
- Date of birth: 26 December 1987 (age 38)
- Place of birth: Llanelli, Wales
- Height: 6 ft 2 in (1.88 m)
- Position: Goalkeeper

Youth career
- –2005: Swansea City

Senior career*
Years	Team	Apps	(Gls)
2005–2006	Swansea City	0	(0)
2005	→ Newport County (loan)	1	(0)
2006–2009	Barnsley	0	(0)
2009	→ Doncaster Rovers (loan)	0	(0)
2009	Plymouth Argyle	0	(0)
2010–2013	Kilmarnock	11	(0)
2013–2015	Dundee	50	(0)
2015–2016	Blackpool	5	(0)
2016–2017	York City	28	(0)
2017–2019	Plymouth Argyle	20	(0)
2019–2020	Salford City	19	(0)
2020–2021	Chesterfield	13	(0)
2021–2022	Morecambe	33	(0)
2022–2023	Hartlepool United	0	(0)
Total		180	(0)

International career
2007	Wales U21	1	(0)
- * Club domestic league appearances and goals

Kyle Charles Letheren (born 26 December 1987) is a Welsh former professional footballer who is a goalkeeper coach at Doncaster Rovers.

A goalkeeper, he played in the Scottish Premier League for Kilmarnock, in the Scottish Premiership for Dundee, and in the English Football League for Blackpool, Plymouth Argyle, Salford City and Morecambe.

== Club career ==
=== Early career ===
Letheren was born in Llanelli, Carmarthenshire. He began his career as a trainee at Swansea City, spending time on loan at Newport County in 2005. He did not make an appearance for the first-team before being released in the summer of 2006.

He subsequently joined Barnsley. Having arrived at Barnsley on a short-term deal, Letheren then signed a new deal to keep him at Oakwell until 2008 Two years after joining the club, he made his debut in the third round of the FA Cup against Blackpool on 5 January 2008, as a half-time substitute, replacing the injured Heinz Müller. At 1–0 down 'the Tykes' went on to win the game 2–1.

He was loaned to Doncaster Rovers for the second half of the 2008–09 season as cover for veteran goalkeeper Neil Sullivan, but he did not make an appearance for them.

He was released from his contract in the summer of 2009 and then signed a short-term contract with Plymouth Argyle in the Championship to provide cover for Romain Larrieu.

On 31 December 2009, Letheren was released from Plymouth Argyle after his contract expired. In April 2010, he agreed to join Motherwell until the end of the season as an emergency goalkeeper, but the Scottish Premier League blocked the move as they were deemed to have enough goalkeepers. He remained at Fir Park to train with the squad for the remainder of the season.

=== Kilmarnock ===
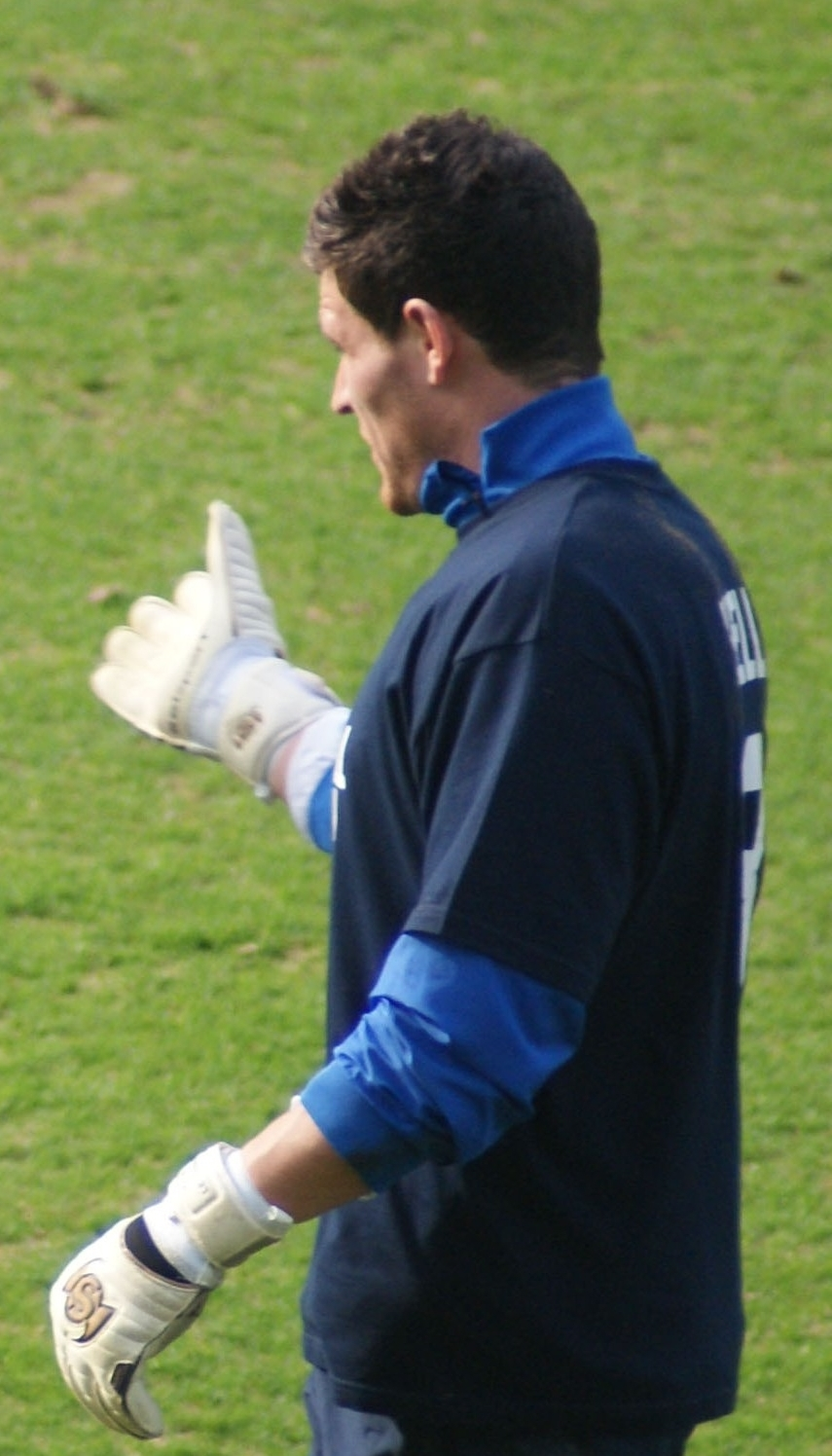
Letheren warming up for Kilmarnock in 2012

Letheren signed for Kilmarnock in August 2010, to provide backup to Cammy Bell. Letheren failed to make an appearance for Kilmarnock in his first season, mostly down to the form of Bell. In 2011–12, he was handed his Scottish Premier League debut as a half time substitute for the injured Bell, ironically against Motherwell, at 0–0 and Kilmarnock went on to win the game 2–0. Later that year he was handed his full SPL debut away to Dunfermline Athletic, in a 2–1 win.

During the 2012–13 season, Cammy Bell suffered an injury leading to Letheren having a run in the first team. That run lasted until mid-October, when Bell returned. His second run in the first team came in early-February, when he played twice, he was involved in a 2–0 win over motherwell & in what was his last appearance for the club, a 1–1 draw against Inverness Caledonian Thistle.

With his contract due to expire at the end of the season, he left Kilmarnock by mutual consent in April 2013.

=== Dundee ===
After leaving Kilmarnock, Letheren was linked with a move to South African side Ajax Cape Town. Letheren went on trial with Dundee, with Manager John Brown saying he had done well. After making an appearance in a pre-season friendly, as a trialist, during which he suffered a thigh injury, it was then announced on 9 July 2013, that Letheren had signed a contract with Dundee.

Letheren played as first-choice goalkeeper for Dundee throughout all of the 2013–14 season. He was voted supporter's association Player of the Year after pulling off a match-winning save in the dying moment of the final game of the season to secure Dundee the Scottish Championship title. Letheren played the first ten matches at the start of the 2014–15 season before injuring his knee in a warm up against Motherwell. It was later announced that he would be out until December. After making his return against Partick Thistle and St Mirren, Letheren was once again sidelined after suffering an injury in the warm-up ahead of the Dundee derby against Dundee United, which allowed Arvid Schenk to take his place, although Schenk went on to concede six goals, in a 6–2 loss. Though he recovered from his injury, Letheren lost his first choice goalkeeper status to Scott Bain throughout the season. However, Letheren was given a chance to play the last three matches at the end of the season following Bain's injury.

At the end of the 2014–15 season, it was announced that Letheren was being released by the club upon the expiry of his contract. Following his release, Letheren was linked with a move to Championship club Bristol City. Letheren explained the reason for his release, saying he wanted regular first team football in the hope of securing a place in the national team.

=== Blackpool and York City ===
Letheren returned to England, agreeing a deal to join League One club Blackpool on 1 July 2015, signing a two-year contract, with an option for a further year.

Letheren's contract with Blackpool was terminated by mutual consent on 25 August 2016 in order for him to join National League club York City. He was signed shortly after York suspended goalkeeper Scott Flinders. On 21 May 2017, Letheren started as York beat Macclesfield Town 3–2 at Wembley Stadium in the 2017 FA Trophy final. He was released at the end of 2016–17.

=== Plymouth Argyle and Salford City ===
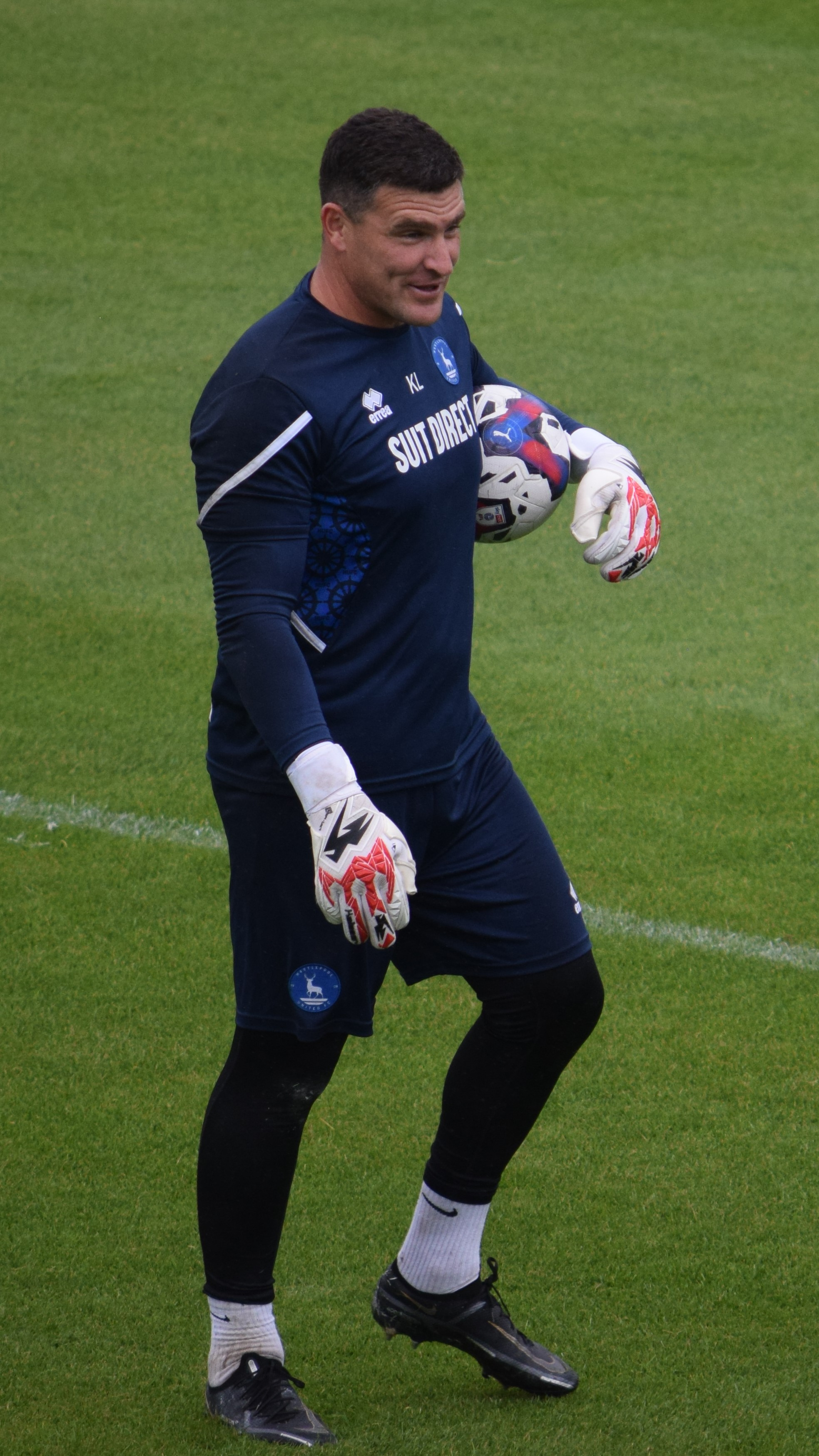
Letheren warming up for Hartlepool United in 2022

Letheren re-signed for League One club Plymouth Argyle on 5 September 2017 on a free transfer. He made his first appearance for Argyle on 26 September, over eight years after he first signed for the club. He was offered a new contract by Plymouth at the end of the 2017–18 season.

He was again offered a new contract by Argyle at the end of the 2018–19 season, but turned it down after new manager Ryan Lowe stated he wanted to bring in a new goalkeeper whether Letheren stayed or not.

Letheren signed for newly promoted League Two club Salford City on 16 July 2019 on a one-year contract. He was released at the end of the 2019–20 season.

=== Chesterfield ===
On 28 August 2020, Letheren signed for National League side Chesterfield. On 24 January 2021, Letheren left the club by mutual consent.

=== Morecambe ===
On 26 January 2021, Letheren signed for League Two side Morecambe. In June 2021, following Morecambe's promotion to League One, Letheren signed a one-year deal with the club. On 8 February 2022, Letheren left the Shrimps by mutual consent.

=== Hartlepool United ===
On 16 June 2022, Letheren signed as player and goalkeeper coach for League Two side Hartlepool United. He made his Hartlepool debut in a 6–0 home defeat to Everton U21s in the EFL Trophy. In June 2023, he left the club by mutual consent.

== International career ==
Letheren represented Wales at schoolboy level and at under-21 level.

On 27 August 2014, Wales manager Chris Coleman announced his first UEFA Euro 2016 qualifying squad and Letheren was called up to the Wales senior squad for their first qualifying match in Andorra after an impressive start to the 2014–15 season with Dundee in which he conceded just two goals in four league matches.

== Coaching career ==
After leaving Hartlepool at the end of the 2022–23 season, he announced his retirement from playing on 9 June 2023. Letheren was then appointed as the new goalkeeper coach for Doncaster Rovers.

== Personal life ==
He is the son of former Leeds United goalkeeper Glan Letheren.

== Career statistics ==
Appearances and goals by club, season and competition
Club	Season	League			National cup (Note: Includes FA Cup, Scottish Cup)		League cup (Note: Includes Scottish League Cup, Football League Cup)		Other		Total	
Club	Season	Division	Apps	Goals	Apps	Goals	Apps	Goals	Apps	Goals	Apps	Goals
Swansea City	2005–06	League One	0	0	0	0	0	0	0	0	0	0
Newport County (loan)	2005–06	Conference South	1	0	—		—		—		1	0
Barnsley	2006–07	Championship	0	0	0	0	0	0	—		0	0
Barnsley	2007–08	Championship	0	0	1	0	0	0	—		1	0
Barnsley	2008–09	Championship	0	0	0	0	0	0	—		0	0
Barnsley	Total		0	0	1	0	0	0	—		1	0
Doncaster Rovers (loan)	2008–09	Championship	0	0	—		—		—		0	0
Plymouth Argyle	2009–10	Championship	0	0	—		0	0	—		0	0
Kilmarnock	2010–11	Scottish Premier League	0	0	0	0	0	0	—		0	0
Kilmarnock	2011–12	Scottish Premier League	2	0	0	0	0	0	—		2	0
Kilmarnock	2012–13	Scottish Premier League	9	0	0	0	1	0	—		10	0
Kilmarnock	Total		11	0	0	0	1	0	—		12	0
Dundee	2013–14	Scottish Championship	35	0	1	0	2	0	1 (Note: Appearance in Scottish Challenge Cup)	0	39	0
Dundee	2014–15	Scottish Premiership	15	0	0	0	2	0	—		17	0
Dundee	Total		50	0	1	0	4	0	1	0	56	0
Blackpool	2015–16	League One	5	0	1	0	1	0	1 (Note: Appearance in Football League Trophy)	0	8	0
Blackpool	2016–17	League Two	0	0	—		0	0	—		0	0
Blackpool	Total		5	0	1	0	1	0	1	0	8	0
York City	2016–17	National League	28	0	1	0	—		7 (Note: Appearances in FA Trophy)	0	36	0
Plymouth Argyle	2017–18	League One	7	0	0	0	—		1 (Note: Appearance(s) in EFL Trophy)	0	8	0
Plymouth Argyle	2018–19	League One	13	0	0	0	0	0	2	0	15	0
Plymouth Argyle	Total		20	0	0	0	0	0	3	0	23	0
Salford City	2019–20	League Two	19	0	0	0	0	0	3	0	22	0
Chesterfield	2020–21	National League	13	0	1	0	0	0	1	0	15	0
Morecambe	2020–21	League Two	21	0	0	0	0	0	3 (Note: Appearances in EFL League Two play-offs)	0	24	0
Morecambe	2021–22	League One	12	0	1	0	0	0	1	0	14	0
Morecambe	Total		33	0	1	0	0	0	4	0	38	0
Hartlepool United	2022–23	League Two	0	0	0	0	0	0	1	0	1	0
Career total			153	0	3	0	6	0	17	0	182	0

== Honours ==
Kilmarnock

- Scottish League Cup: 2011–12

Dundee

- Scottish Championship: 2013–14

York City

- FA Trophy: 2016–17

Morecambe

- EFL League Two play-offs: 2021
