= Kevin Thomson =

Scottish footballer (born 1984)

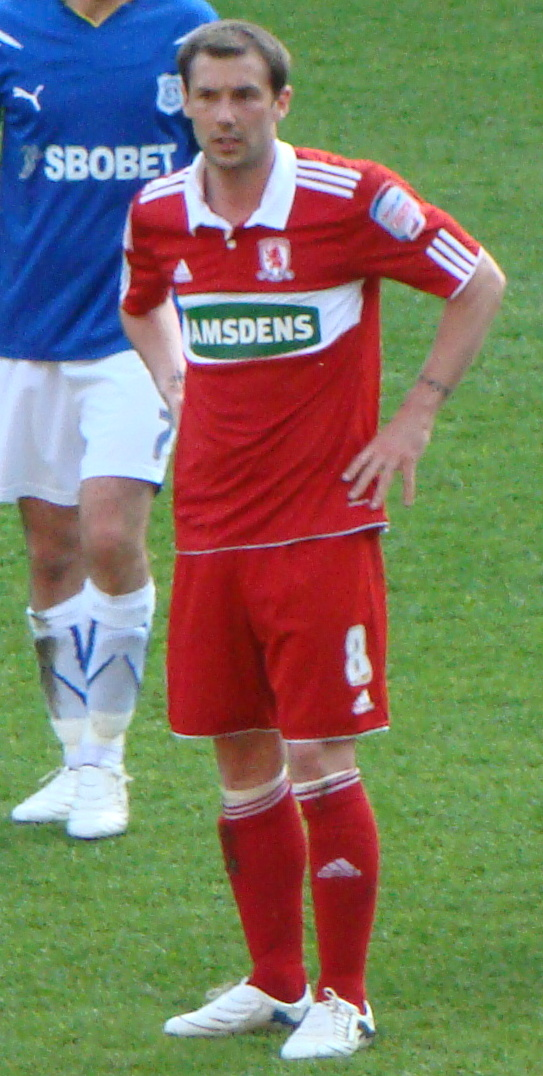
- Thomson playing for Middlesbrough in 2011

Personal information
- Full name: Kevin Thomson
- Date of birth: 14 October 1984 (age 42)
- Place of birth: Edinburgh, Scotland
- Position: Midfielder

Youth career
- 2000–2001: Peebles Rovers
- –2000: Hutchison Vale
- 2000–2001: Coventry City
- 2001–2003: Hibernian

Senior career*
Years	Team	Apps	(Gls)
2003–2007	Hibernian	80	(2)
2007–2010	Rangers	71	(2)
2010–2013	Middlesbrough	50	(0)
2013–2014	Hibernian	24	(0)
2014–2016	Dundee	36	(0)
2016	Hibernian	5	(0)
2016	Tranent Juniors	3	(1)
Total		266	(4)

International career
2005–2006	Scotland U21	6	(0)
2007	Scotland B	2	(0)
2008–2010	Scotland	3	(0)

Managerial career
- 2021–2022: Kelty Hearts
- * Club domestic league appearances and goals

Kevin Thomson (born 14 October 1984) is a Scottish professional football coach and former player.

Thomson played as a midfielder for Hibernian (three spells), Rangers, Middlesbrough and Dundee and represented Scotland.

Thomson began his career with Hibernian, before joining Rangers in 2007 for a £2m transfer fee. Thomson won five major trophies with Rangers, including consecutive Scottish Premier League championships in 2009 and 2010. Thomson was also part of the Rangers side which reached the 2008 UEFA Cup Final. Middlesbrough signed Thomson for a fee of £2m in July 2010, but released him in January 2013 after an injury-hit spell. Thomson then rejoined Hibernian in March 2013, but was released in May 2014 after the club was relegated. He then signed for Dundee, before joining Hibernian for a third time.

Thomson retired from playing in 2016. After a stint coaching Rangers youth teams, he managed Kelty Hearts for one season.

== Early life ==
Thomson grew up in Peebles, in the Scottish Borders. His first club was Peebles Rovers, who play in the Eastern Region Youth League. He then moved on to play for Edinburgh youth side Hutchison Vale before being signed by Coventry City on a four-year contract, but suffered from homesickness and returned to Scotland with Hibernian.

== Club career ==
=== Hibernian ===
Thomson joined Hibernian on 10 August 2001. He was one of a group of young players who came through their youth team during the early 2000s, also including Steven Whittaker, Derek Riordan, Scott Brown and Garry O'Connor. Thomson established himself as a regular in the Hibernian first team during the 2003–04 season and played in that season's Scottish League Cup final defeat by Livingston, but he suffered a serious cruciate ligament injury during a game against Partick Thistle near the end of that season. The injury meant that he was out of football for almost a year, and he consequently made only four league appearances in the 2004–05 season.

In the 2005–06 season Thomson made his comeback from his injury, establishing himself as one of Hibernian's most important players. He signed a long-term contract (until 2010) in March 2006. Thomson was appointed as club captain by Tony Mowbray after the previous captain Gary Caldwell left the club to join Celtic. Despite signing a long-term contract with Hibernian, it was still speculated that Thomson would soon leave Hibs. On 31 August 2006, Premier League club Bolton Wanderers made an offer that was rejected by Hibernian.

Speculation about Thomson's future increased after he (and Scott Brown) appointed Willie McKay as his agent. McKay demanded that Hibernian offer Brown and Thomson wages commensurate with the transfer fees Hibernian were demanding for the players. Hibernian would have needed to significantly break their pay scale to offer such wages. Hibernian refused to meet with McKay to discuss improved contracts, which resulted in Brown submitting a written transfer request.

On 20 December 2006, Charlton Athletic made a joint offer for Brown and Thomson, which was rejected by Hibernian. This sparked a further round of speculation, as Brown and Thomson demanded to know why they had not been informed of the offer before it was rejected. Thomson was stripped of the captaincy on 2 January 2007 and was replaced by Rob Jones. Thomson was told by manager John Collins to concentrate on his game because he believed that Thomson's performance levels had dropped since the transfer speculation began.

=== Rangers ===
Thomson signed for Walter Smith's Rangers for a fee of £2 million on 30 January 2007. Less than two months earlier, Smith had been critical of Thomson's behaviour, calling on him to show more "responsibility", although this was a month before Smith had been appointed as Rangers manager. Thomson made his Rangers debut on 11 February in a 3–1 victory over Kilmarnock, although he was substituted at half-time after suffering a hamstring injury.

Thomson established himself as a regular in the Rangers first team. He scored his first goal for Rangers in a victory against Celtic on 29 March 2008 and he played in the club's run to the 2008 UEFA Cup Final and winning the League Cup and Scottish Cup in his first full season.

Thomson scored his second goal of the 2008–09 season when he scored an equalising goal in injury time against Dundee United at Ibrox Stadium, on 4 November 2008. In the following league match against Kilmarnock at Rugby Park, a 4–0 victory for Rangers was overshadowed by Thomson suffering a serious knee injury. This injury ruled him out for the rest of the 2008–09 season. Thomson had surgery to save his career on 31 December 2008. The surgery was a success and Thomson hoped to be fit for the following season. On his return to the Rangers first team, Thomson was sent off in the 13th minute of a 2–1 win against Hearts.

Thomson was sent off in the 2010 League Cup Final in the second half for a poorly timed challenge, although Rangers won the match 1–0 despite Danny Wilson also being shown a red card. Thomson helped Rangers win their second title in a row in 2010.

=== Middlesbrough ===
Rangers accepted a £2m offer from Middlesbrough for Thomson in July 2010. Middlesbrough then confirmed that Thomson had passed a medical, despite the player having suffered two serious knee injuries earlier in his career, and completed his transfer. In his second league match for Middlesbrough, Thomson suffered a fractured fibula against Leicester City, which prevented him from playing for two months. Further injury problems meant that Thomson only played in 44 games during his first two seasons with Middlesbrough. His contract with Middlesbrough was cancelled on 31 January 2013 by mutual consent.

=== Later career ===
Thomson trained with Hibernian, one of his former clubs, in February 2013. A move appeared unlikely because Hibs had no spare budget to pay Thomson with, but he decided in March to forego any salary and signed with the club until the end of the 2012–13 season. Thomson made his second debut appearance for Hibs in a goalless draw against Hearts on 10 March. He agreed a new one-year contract with Hibs in July 2013. Thomson dropped out of the Hibs team after manager Pat Fenlon was replaced with Terry Butcher, and was made available for transfer in January 2014. Thomson was released by Hibs following their relegation to the Scottish Championship.

Thomson signed for newly promoted Scottish Premiership club Dundee in May 2014. Shortly after his arrival he was appointed club captain by manager Paul Hartley. On 15 January 2016, Thomson left the club by mutual consent having made 38 appearances over 18 months for The Dee.

On 22 January 2016, Thomson joined Hibernian for a third time, on a deal until the end of the 2015–16 season. He combined his playing duties with coaching the development squads under Eddie May and started the Scottish League Cup Final, which Hibs lost 2–1 to Ross County.

After just six months back at Easter Road, Thomson signed for Tranent Juniors in June 2016, agreeing a two-year deal with the SJFA East Premier League side. In August 2016, he left Tranent with the club saying he couldn't combine playing for them with his media commitments.

== International career ==
Thomson made his debut for Scotland in a goalless draw versus Northern Ireland on 20 August 2008. After a three-year absence, Thomson was recalled to the national squad in September 2013.

== Coaching ==
Thomson worked with former club Rangers as a youth coach before being appointed as manager of Kelty Hearts on 28 May 2021, replacing former team-mate Barry Ferguson, who left Kelty to become manager of Alloa Athletic. Thomson guided Kelty to the 2021–22 Scottish League Two championship, before he resigned on 31 May 2022.

He also runs a football academy, named The Kevin Thomson Academy, which he opened in 2016.

== Career statistics ==
As of 19:02, 23 May 2016 (UTC)

Club	Season	League			Cup		League Cup		Other^{[A]}		Total	
Club	Season	Division	Apps	Goals	Apps	Goals	Apps	Goals	Apps	Goals	Apps	Goals
Hibernian	2003–04 (Note: Includes match against Rangers on 30 November 2003 which was not recorded for Kevin Thomson due to a Soccerbase error)	Scottish Premier League	23	1	0	0	3	1	0	0	26	2
Hibernian	2004–05	Scottish Premier League	3	0	1	0	0	0	0	0	4	0
Hibernian	2005–06	Scottish Premier League	31	0	3	0	1	0	2	0	37	0
Hibernian	2006–07	Scottish Premier League	23	1	1	0	3	0	4	0	31	1
Hibernian	Total		80	2	5	0	7	1	6	0	98	3
Rangers	2006–07	Scottish Premier League	9	0	0	0	0	0	3	0	12	0
Rangers	2007–08	Scottish Premier League	26	1	5	0	1	0	12	0	44	1
Rangers	2008–09 (Note: Total includes both matches versus FBK Kaunas. Thomson started both legs per the BBC match reports (1st leg); (2nd leg), but it is not recorded by Soccerbase (1st leg); (2nd leg))	Scottish Premier League	11	1	0	0	1	0	2	1	14	2
Rangers	2009–10	Scottish Premier League	25	0	4	0	4	0	6	0	39	0
Rangers	Total		71	2	9	0	6	0	23	1	109	3
Middlesbrough	2010–11	English Championship	19	0	0	0	0	0	0	0	19	0
Middlesbrough	2011–12	English Championship	22	0	2	0	1	0	0	0	25	0
Middlesbrough	2012–13	English Championship	9	0	1	0	2	0	0	0	12	0
Middlesbrough	Total		50	0	3	0	3	0	0	0	56	0
Hibernian	2012–13	Scottish Premier League	6	0	2	0	0	0	0	0	8	0
Hibernian	2013–14	Scottish Premiership	18	0	0	0	1	0	3	0	22	0
Hibernian	Total		24	0	2	0	1	0	3	0	30	0
Dundee	2014–15	Scottish Premiership	24	0	1	0	1	0	0	0	26	0
Dundee	2015–16	Scottish Premiership	12	0	0	0	0	0	0	0	12	0
Dundee	Total		36	0	1	0	1	0	0	0	38	0
Hibernian	2015–16	Scottish Championship	5	0	3	0	1	0	0	0	9	0
Career total			266	4	23	0	19	1	32	1	340	6

A. Includes UEFA Intertoto Cup, UEFA Cup, Champions League, Europa League and Scottish Premiership play-offs.

== Managerial statistics ==
As of match played 30 April 2022

Managerial record by team and tenure
Team	Nat	From	To	Record					Ref.
Team	Nat	From	To	G	W	D	L	Win %	Ref.
Kelty Hearts	(Scotland)	28 May 2021	31 May 2022	46	28	12	6	60.87	

== Honours ==
=== Player ===
Rangers

- Scottish Premier League: 2008–09, 2009–10
- Scottish Cup: 2007–08
- Scottish League Cup: 2007–08, 2009–10

Individual

- SPL Young Player of the Month: September 2005

=== Manager ===
Kelty Hearts

- Scottish League Two: 2021–22

Individual

- SPFL League Two Manager of the Month: August 2021; November 2021; March 2022
