= Arvid Schenk =

German footballer

Personal information
- Full name: Arvid Christian Schenk
- Date of birth: 28 July 1989 (age 37)
- Place of birth: Rostock, East Germany
- Height: 1.96 m (6 ft 5 in)
- Position: Goalkeeper

Team information
- Current team: Hamburger SV II (goalkeeping coach)

Youth career
- 2004–2008: Hansa Rostock

Senior career*
| Years | Team | Apps | (Gls) |
| 2008–2009 | Hansa Rostock II | 8 | (0) |
| 2009–2012 | FC St. Pauli II | 46 | (0) |
| 2012–2014 | VfL Wolfsburg II | 4 | (0) |
| 2014–2015 | Dundee | 1 | (0) |
| 2015–2016 | Altona 93 | 7 | (0) |
| 2016–2017 | SV Eichede | 10 | (0) |
| Total | | 76 | (0) |
- * Club domestic league appearances and goals

Arvid Schenk (born 28 July 1989) is a German former professional footballer who played as a goalkeeper. He is the goalkeeping coach for Hamburger SV II.

== Career ==
Schenk was signed by Dundee in October 2014, to provide goalkeeping cover after Kyle Letheren was injured. He made his first and only appearance for Dundee in a Dundee derby on 1 January 2015, but experienced a "nightmare debut" as Dundee lost 6–2 to Dundee United. It was the first time that Dundee had conceded six goals in a Dundee derby match. He was released by Dundee on 28 January 2015. After a couple of years back in the regional leagues of Germany, Schenk retired from football in 2017.

Since 2017, Schenk has been a youth goalkeeping coach for Hamburger SV, and for the majority of that time has been the goalkeeping coach for Hamburger SV II.
