= Calvin Colquhoun =

Scottish footballer

Personal information
- Full name: Calvin Colquhoun
- Date of birth: 25 July 1996 (age 30)
- Place of birth: Scotland
- Position: Midfielder

Team information
- Current team: Lochee United

Youth career
- 2013–2015: Dundee

Senior career*
Years	Team	Apps	(Gls)
2015–2017	Dundee	5	(0)
2016–2017	→ Stirling Albion (loan)	14	(0)
2017–2021	Downfield Juniors		
2021–	Lochee United		
- * Club domestic league appearances and goals as of 01:25, 7 June 2021 (UTC)

Calvin Colquhoun (born 25 July 1996) is a Scottish professional footballer who plays for Lochee United.

He made his first team debut for Dundee in May 2015, appearing in a 5–0 defeat against Celtic. On 25 November 2016, Colquhoun signed for Scottish League Two side Stirling Albion on loan, initially until January 2017, however, his loan was subsequently extended until the end of the season. At the end of his contract in May 2017, Colquhoun was released by Dundee. After leaving Dundee, Colquhoun joined Downfield Juniors and worked as a plumber with the Penman Group. In June 2021, Colquhoun signed with Lochee United.
