= Luka Tankulic =

German footballer (born 1991)

Personal information
- Date of birth: 21 June 1991 (age 35)
- Place of birth: Ahlen, Germany
- Height: 1.82 m (6 ft 0 in)
- Position: Forward

Team information
- Current team: Rot-Weiss Ahlen (director)

Youth career
- –2002: Ahlener SG
- 2002–2005: LR Ahlen
- 2005–2007: Borussia Dortmund
- 2007–2009: Rot-Weiss Ahlen

Senior career*
Years	Team	Apps	(Gls)
2009–2011	Rot-Weiss Ahlen	23	(1)
2011	→ Fortuna Düsseldorf II (loan)	13	(1)
2011–2012	Mainz 05 II	26	(3)
2012–2014	VfL Wolfsburg II	57	(10)
2014–2015	Dundee	27	(2)
2016–2018	Sportfreunde Lotte	48	(2)
2018–2023	SV Meppen	135	(31)
2023–2025	Rot-Weiss Ahlen	43	(4)

Managerial career
- 2025: Rot-Weiss Ahlen
- * Club domestic league appearances and goals as of 16 May 2024

Luka Tankulic (born 21 June 1991) is a former German professional footballer who is the director of football of German club Rot-Weiss Ahlen.

== Career ==
Tankulic began his career with Ahlener SG and was later scouted by city rival LR Ahlen. After three years with the club he signed with Borussia Dortmund in summer 2005. After two years with Borussia he signed with Rot-Weiss Ahlen, where he played his debut match in the DFB Cup on 22 September 2009 leading to a contract with the club, signed on 6 October 2009, which runs through 30 June 2012.

On 15 July 2014, after Tankulic appeared as a trialist for Dundee F.C. in their pre-season fixture against Manchester City and scored in a 2–0 win, manager Paul Hartley expressed a desire to offer the player a contract. Tankulic and his compatriot Thomas Konrad subsequently signed two-year contracts with Dundee in July 2014. He scored on his debut as Dundee won 4–0 against Peterhead on 2 August 2014, in the Scottish League Cup. On 28 August 2015, Tankulic left Dundee, with his contract being terminated by mutual consent.

In February 2016, Tankulic signed for Regionalliga West club Sportfreunde Lotte.

Tankulic would play for SV Meppen for 5 years, helping get the club promoted to and stay in the 3. Liga and becoming club captain. In 2023, Tankulic would leave Meppen and return to his hometown and to former club Rot-Weiss Ahlen.
