= Thomas Konrad =

German footballer (born 1989)

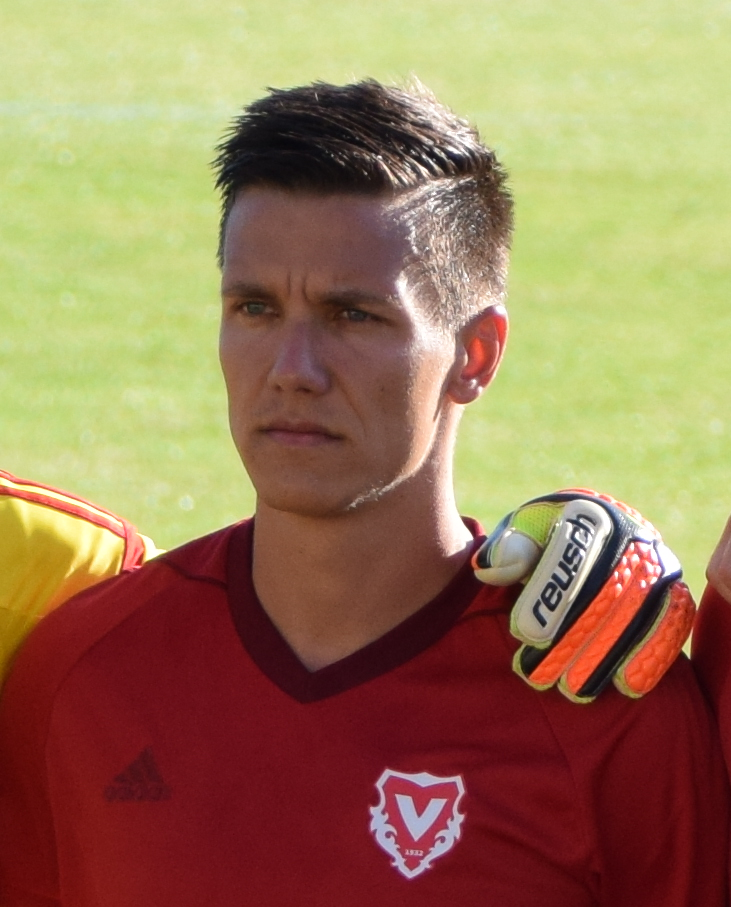
- Konrad with Vaduz in 2017

Personal information
- Date of birth: 5 November 1989 (age 37)
- Place of birth: Bruchsal, West Germany
- Height: 1.83 m (6 ft 0 in)
- Position: Centre-back

Team information
- Current team: 1899 Hoffenheim (youth coach)

Youth career
- Germania Untergrombach
- FV Neuthard
- 2005–2008: Karlsruher SC

Senior career*
Years	Team	Apps	(Gls)
2008–2012	Karlsruher SC II	56	(0)
2010–2012	Karlsruher SC	4	(0)
2012–2014	Eintracht Trier	37	(0)
2014–2016	Dundee	60	(1)
2016–2018	Vaduz	42	(2)
2018–2019	Viktoria Berlin	2	(0)
2019–2020	VfL Osnabrück	7	(0)
2021–2022	FSV Frankfurt	18	(0)

Managerial career
- 2022–: 1899 Hoffenheim (youth coach)
- * Club domestic league appearances and goals

Thomas Konrad (born 5 November 1989) is a German former professional footballer who played as a centre-back.

== Career ==
On 13 July 2014, Konrad appeared as a trialist for Dundee in their pre-season fixture against Manchester City, doing enough to impress manager Paul Hartley who expressed a desire to offer the player a contract. He and his compatriot Luka Tankulić subsequently signed two-year contracts with Dundee in July 2014. Konrad left Dens Park at the end of the 2015–16 season.

After playing for FC Vaduz and several German teams, Konrad signed with Regionalliga Südwest side FSV Frankfurt in June 2021. At the end of the season, Konrad officially announced his retirement from professional football. In May 2022, 1899 Hoffenheim confirmed that Konrad had joined the club as an youth coach and youth scout.

== Honours ==
Vaduz

- Liechtenstein Football Cup: 2016-17
