= 2018–19 Dundee F.C. season =

Dundee
2018–19 season
- Chairman: Tim Keyes
- Manager: Neil McCann (until 16 Oct); Jim McIntyre (from 17 Oct – 12 May); James McPake (Interim) (from 12 May)
- Stadium: Dens Park
- Scottish Premiership: 12th (relegated)
- League Cup: Second Round, lost to Ayr United
- Scottish Cup: Fourth Round, lost to Queen of the South
- Top goalscorer: League: Kenny Miller (8); All: Kenny Miller (8)
- Highest home attendance: 8,578 vs Rangers (Prem)
- Lowest home attendance: 2,058 vs Brechin City (LC)
- Average home league attendance: 6,025
Home colours	Away colours	Third colours

The 2018–19 season was Dundee's fifth consecutive season in the top flight of Scottish football since their promotion at the end of the 2013–14 season. Dundee also competed in the League Cup and the Scottish Cup. On 4 May, Dundee were automatically relegated to the Championship.

== Season summary ==
Dundee player Paul McGowan admitted in court to spitting on a bouncer after leaving a nightclub after the previous seasons awards. Dens manager Neil McCann admitted there was "No positives" to take from the defeat in their second League Cup group match to Dunfermline Athletic in which they lost 1–0. Dundee were knocked out of the Second Round of the League Cup by Ayr United with manager Neil McCann saying the "3-0 scoreline probably flattered us." Neil McCann said it was a "sore one to take" after Dundee's loss against Hibernian, their sixth straight league loss leaving them pointless at the bottom of the league. On 16 October, McCann was sacked from his role, taking assistant manager Graham Gartland with him and leaving the club bottom of league with 7 defeats in 8 league matches. On 17 October, the club announced Jim McIntyre as their new manager. Jim would have a poor start to his stint as Dundee manager, where the team lost 4 games in a row, conceding 13 goals and scoring none in that space. Starting with a home draw against relegation rivals St Mirren, Dundee would go on an unbeaten streak, coming back from 2 goals down to draw at Easter Road and earning a decisive 4–0 victory over Hamilton Accies. However, they failed to win another match until after the winter break at Hearts. Dundee also crashed out of the Scottish Cup with a 3–0 defeat in a replay away to Queen of the South. Dundee ended the pre-split fixtures by losing 7 matches, the joint worst run throughout the League season. This losing run continued after the split, and the club were relegated on 4 May in a 1–0 loss to Hamilton Academical with ex-Dundee United player Tony Andreu scoring the winner in the 83rd minute after a penalty was conceded by Ryan McGowan. This loss marked their tenth in a row, the worst run of defeats in the Premiership in 15 years. On 12 May, Jim McIntyre and assistant manager Jimmy Boyle were sacked by the club. Ex-player and reserve team coach James McPake was named as interim manager for the final game against St Mirren. Darren O'Dea would also play his final professional game against St Mirren, but would be sent off just 22 minutes into the game, in what would finish as a 2–3 defeat.

== Competitions ==
=== Premiership ===
4 August 2018 1	St Mirren	2–1	Dundee	St Mirren Park, Paisley
15:00	Mullen 8', 83'	Report	Ngwatala 12'	Attendance: 5,470; Referee: Alan Muir

11 August 2018 2	Dundee	0–1	Aberdeen	Dens Park, Dundee
15:00		Report	Mackay-Steven 74' (pen.)	Attendance: 7,581; Referee: Bobby Madden

25 August 2018 3	St Johnstone	1–0	Dundee	McDiarmid Park, Perth
15:00	Watt 51'	Report		Attendance: 4,259; Referee: Steven McLean

1 September 2018 4	Dundee	1–3	Motherwell	Dens Park, Dundee
15:00	Källman 71'	Report	Johnson 56'; Bigirimana 68'; Campbell 86'	Attendance: 5,137; Referee: Gavin Duncan

15 September 2018 5	Rangers	4–0	Dundee	Ibrox Stadium, Glasgow
15:00	Coulibaly 4'; Kent 14'; Tavernier 45+3' (pen.); Middleton 83'	Report	K. Miller (red card) 79'	Attendance: 50,130; Referee: Kevin Clancy

22 September 2018 6	Dundee	0–3	Hibernian	Dens Park, Dundee
15:00		Report	Kamberi 51'; Boyle 54'; Agyepong 88'	Attendance: 6,076; Referee: Andrew Dallas

29 September 2018 7	Hamilton Academical	0–2	Dundee	New Douglas Park, Hamilton
15:00		Report	Boyle 38'; Madianga 90+3'	Attendance: 1,788; Referee: Willie Collum

6 October 2018 8	Dundee	1–2	Kilmarnock	Dens Park, Dundee
15:00	Nabi 10'	Report	Boyle 17' (o.g.); Brophy 54' (pen.)	Attendance: 5,158; Referee: Steven McLean

20 October 2018 9	Livingston	4–0	Dundee	Almondvale Stadium, Livingston
15:00	Gallagher 18'; Halkett 43'; Lawless 76'; Lithgow 89'	Report		Attendance: 2,137; Referee: Nick Walsh

23 October 2018 10	Dundee	0–3	Heart of Midlothian	Dens Park, Dundee
19:45		BBC Report	Bozanic 2'; Naismith 14'; MacLean 46'	Attendance: 6,112; Referee: Craig Thomson

31 October 2018 11	Dundee	0–5	Celtic	Dens Park, Dundee
19:45		Report	Rogic 20'; Sinclair 33' (pen.); Forrest 38'; Édouard 45+2'; Christie 48'	Attendance: 7,960; Referee: Alan Muir

3 November 2018 12	Motherwell	1–0	Dundee	Fir Park, Motherwell
15:00	Turnbull 69'	Report		Attendance: 4,129; Referee: Alan Muir

10 November 2018 13	Dundee	1–1	St Mirren	Dens Park, Dundee
15:00	K. Miller 33'	Report	Jackson 21' (pen.)	Attendance: 5,552; Referee: Bobby Madden

24 November 2018 14	Hibernian	2–2	Dundee	Easter Road, Edinburgh
15:00	Kusunga 1' (o.g.); Porteous 30'	Report	K. Miller 45+1'; McGowan 47'	Attendance: 16,190; Referee: Greg Aitken

5 December 2018 15	Dundee	4–0	Hamilton Academical	Dens Park, Dundee
19:45	K. Miller 27', 51', 81'; J. Curran 69'	Report		Attendance: 4,426; Referee: John Beaton

9 December 2018 16	Dundee	1–1	Rangers	Dens Park, Dundee
13:30	K. Miller 9'; Ralph (red card) 20'	Report	Halliday 21'	Attendance: 8,578; Referee: Alan Muir

15 December 2018 17	Kilmarnock	3–1	Dundee	Rugby Park, Kilmarnock
15:00	Broadfoot 54'; Kusunga 66' (o.g.); Stewart 79'	Report	K. Miller 90+1'	Attendance: 4,668; Referee: Kevin Clancy

18 December 2018 18	Aberdeen	5–1	Dundee	Pittodrie Stadium, Aberdeen
19:45	Cosgrove 16', 44'; Considine 50', 73'; McLennan 56'	Report	C. Miller 68'	Attendance: 13,142; Referee: Nick Walsh

22 December 2018 19	Celtic	3–0	Dundee	Celtic Park, Glasgow
15:00	Johnston 43', 50'; Benković 69'	Report		Attendance: 57,234; Referee: Euan Anderson

26 December 2018 20	Dundee	0–0	Livingston	Dens Park, Dundee
15:00		Report	Hamilton (red card) 84'	Attendance: 4,905; Referee: Bobby Madden

29 December 2018 21	Dundee	0–2	St Johnstone	Dens Park, Dundee
15:00		Report	Tanser 1'; Craig 58'	Attendance: 6,868; Referee: Don Robertson

23 January 2019 22	Heart of Midlothian	1–2	Dundee	Tynecastle Park, Edinburgh
19:45	Lee 40'	Report	Kusunga 24'; Nelson 62'	Attendance: 15,518; Referee: John Beaton

26 January 2019 23	Dundee	0–1	Motherwell	Dens Park, Dundee
15:00		Report	Turnbull 60' (pen.)	Attendance: 4,887; Referee: Willie Collum

2 February 2019 24	Hamilton Academical	1–1	Dundee	New Douglas Park, Hamilton
15:00	MacKinnon 90+1'	Report	Wright 66'	Attendance: 2,297; Referee: Euan Anderson

6 February 2019 25	Dundee	2–2	Kilmarnock	Dens Park, Dundee
19:45	Nelson 8', 20'	Report	McAleny 18'; Burke 54'	Attendance: 4,694; Referee: Kevin Clancy

16 February 2019 26	Livingston	1–2	Dundee	Almondvale Stadium, Livingston
15:00	Byrne (red card) 14'; Halkett 18'	Report	Nelson 54'; Wright 82'	Attendance: 2,321; Referee: Greg Aitken

23 February 2019 27	Dundee	2–4	Hibernian	Dens Park, Dundee
15:00	McGowan 35'; Woods 79'	Report	Kamberi 26'; McNulty 39', 63'; Mallan 66'	Attendance: 6,450; Referee: John Beaton

27 February 2019 28	Rangers	4–0	Dundee	Ibrox Stadium, Glasgow
19:45	Kamara 4'; Tavernier 8'; Morelos 23'; Defoe 89'	Report		Attendance: 48,859; Referee: Don Robertson

9 March 2019 29	Dundee	0–1	Heart of Midlothian	Dens Park, Dundee
15:00		Report	Clare 15'	Attendance: 5,667; Referee: Nick Walsh

16 March 2019 30	Dundee	0–1	Celtic	Dens Park, Dundee
15:00		Report	Édouard 90+6'	Attendance: 7,608; Referee: Bobby Madden

30 March 2019 31	St Mirren	2–1	Dundee	St Mirren Park, Paisley
15:00	Mullen 12'; Lyons 57'	Report	Robson 1'	Attendance: 6,733; Referee: Willie Collum

3 April 2019 32	St Johnstone	2–0	Dundee	McDiarmid Park, Perth
19:45	Hendry 16'; Kennedy 60'	Report		Attendance: 3,767; Referee: Greg Aitken

6 April 2019 33	Dundee	0–2	Aberdeen	Dens Park, Dundee
15:00		Report	Cosgrove 59' (pen.), 77'	Attendance: 6,593; Referee: Andrew Dallas

20 April 2019 34	St Johnstone	2–0	Dundee	McDiarmid Park, Perth
15:00	Tanser 54'; Hendry 68'	Report		Attendance: 3,946; Referee: Alan Muir

27 April 2019 35	Motherwell	4–3	Dundee	Fir Park, Motherwell
15:00	Turnbull 12', 90+5'; Scott 24'; Ariyibi 50'; Gorrin (red card) 58'	Report	Woods 11' (pen.); Robson 22'; Ralph 52'	Attendance: 3,662; Referee: Kevin Clancy

4 May 2019 36	Dundee	0–1	Hamilton Academical	Dens Park, Dundee
15:00		Report	Andreu 83' (pen.)	Attendance: 4,622; Referee: Nick Walsh

11 May 2019 37	Livingston	0–1	Dundee	Almondvale Stadium, Livingston
15:00		Report	K. Miller 11'	Attendance: 1,374; Referee: Alan Newlands

18 May 2019 38	Dundee	2–3	St Mirren	Dens Park, Dundee
12:30	Kerr 14'; O'Dea (red card) 22'; Wright 74'	Report	Cooke 51', 58', 76'	Attendance: 5,595; Referee: Alan Muir

=== Scottish Cup ===
19 January 2019 Fourth Round	Dundee	1–1	Queen of the South	Dens Park, Dundee
15:00	J. Curran 45'	Report	Dobbie 28'	Attendance: 2,728; Referee: Kevin Clancy

29 January 2019 Fourth Round Replay	Queen of the South	3–0	Dundee	Palmerston Park, Dumfries
19:45	Dobbie 12', 27', 74'			Attendance: 1,421; Referee: Steven McLean

=== League Cup ===
==== Group stage ====
14 July 2018 Group D	Stirling Albion	0–4	Dundee	Forthbank Stadium, Stirling
15:00		Report	Moussa 39', 57'; Mendy 63'; Wighton 69'	Attendance: 1,400; Referee: Gavin Ross

22 July 2018 Group D	Dundee	0–1	Dunfermline Athletic	Dens Park, Dundee
15:00		Report	Longridge 2'	Attendance: 2,870; Referee: Bobby Madden

25 July 2018 Group D	Peterhead	0–2	Dundee	Balmoor Stadium, Peterhead
		Report	Madianga 49'; Mendy 90+3'	Attendance: 934; Referee: Euan Anderson

28 July 2018 Group D	Dundee	2–0	Brechin City	Dens Park, Dundee
	Spence 11'; McGowan 59'	Report	Tapping (red card) 90+4'	Attendance: 2,058; Referee: Kevin Clancy

==== Knockout stage ====
18 August 2018 Second round	Dundee	0–3	Ayr United	Dens Park, Dundee
	Moussa (yellow card) 62' (yellow-red card) 77'; Kusunga (red card) 90'	Report	Shankland 51', 86'; Moffat 89'	Attendance: 3,151; Referee: John Beaton

== Squad statistics ==
=== Appearances ===
As of 18 May 2019

No.	Pos	Nat	Player	Total		Premiership		Scottish Cup		League Cup	
No.	Pos	Nat	Player	Apps	Goals	Apps	Goals	Apps	Goals	Apps	Goals
1	GK	(Scotland) SCO	Jack Hamilton	20	0	17	0	0	0	3	0
2	DF	(Scotland) SCO	Cammy Kerr	34	1	27+1	1	2	0	4	0
3	DF	(England) ENG	Nathan Ralph	32	1	25	1	3	0	3+1	0
4	MF	(Scotland) SCO	Martin Woods	25	2	22+2	2	1	0	0	0
5	DF	(Angola) ANG	Genseric Kusunga	29	1	22+2	1	2	0	3	0
6	DF	(Republic of Ireland) IRL	Darren O'Dea	23	0	21+1	0	1	0	0	0
7	MF	(Republic of Ireland) IRL	John O'Sullivan	11	0	6+5	0	0	0	0	0
10	FW	(Scotland) SCO	Scott Wright	13	3	11+2	3	0	0	0	0
12	GK	(England) ENG	Elliot Parish	7	0	5	0	0	0	2	0
15	DF	(Australia) AUS	Ryan McGowan	14	0	14	0	0	0	0	0
16	MF	(England) ENG	Ethan Robson	13	2	12+1	2	0	0	0	0
17	FW	(England) ENG	Andy Dales	12	0	8+2	0	1+1	0	0	0
18	MF	(Scotland) SCO	Paul McGowan	36	3	23+7	2	2	0	4	1
19	MF	(Finland) FIN	Benjamin Källman	19	1	11+7	1	0	0	0+1	0
20	FW	(Scotland) SCO	Kenny Miller	34	8	21+11	8	2	0	0	0
21	FW	(England) ENG	Andrew Nelson	14	4	9+3	4	1+1	0	0	0
23	FW	(England) ENG	Craig Curran	16	0	11+3	0	2	0	0	0
24	DF	(England) ENG	Josh Meekings	9	0	4	0	0	0	5	0
27	MF	(Philippines) PHI	Jesse Curran	40	2	24+10	1	1	1	3+2	0
28	MF	(Sweden) SWE	Andreas Hadenius	3	0	3	0	0	0	0	0
29	MF	(England) ENG	James Horsfield	11	0	10+1	0	0	0	0	0
31	GK	(Senegal) SEN	Seny Dieng	18	0	16	0	2	0	0	0
42	MF	(Scotland) SCO	Max Anderson	0	0	0	0	0	0	0	0
43	DF	(Scotland) SCO	Brian Rice	0	0	0	0	0	0	0	0
45	MF	(Scotland) SCO	Callum Moore	4	0	1+2	0	0+1	0	0	0
46	FW	(Scotland) SCO	Matthew Henvey	3	0	0+1	0	0	0	0+2	0
47	MF	(England) ENG	Jack Lambert	5	0	0+4	0	0+1	0	0	0
52	MF	(Scotland) SCO	Finlay Robertson	1	0	1	0	0	0	0	0
53	MF	(Scotland) SCO	Lyall Cameron	0	0	0	0	0	0	0	0
54	MF	(Scotland) SCO	Josh Mulligan	1	0	0+1	0	0	0	0	0
55	MF	(Scotland) SCO	Cameron Dow	0	0	0	0	0	0	0	0
Players away from the club on loan:
21	MF	(England) ENG	James Vincent	0	0	0	0	0	0	0	0
25	DF	(Wales) WAL	Daniel Jefferies	0	0	0	0	0	0	0	0
29	FW	(Canada) CAN	Marcus Haber	0	0	0	0	0	0	0	0
34	DF	(Scotland) SCO	Kerr Waddell	0	0	0	0	0	0	0	0
35	MF	(England) ENG	Cedwyn Scott	0	0	0	0	0	0	0	0
36	GK	(Scotland) SCO	Kyle Gourlay	0	0	0	0	0	0	0	0
38	GK	(England) ENG	Calum Ferrie	0	0	0	0	0	0	0	0
Players who left the club during the season:
4	DF	(England) ENG	Steven Caulker	5	0	2	0	0	0	2+1	0
7	MF	(England) ENG	Roarie Deacon	7	0	1+4	0	2	0	0	0
8	MF	(Finland) FIN	Glen Kamara	19	0	16+1	0	0	0	1+1	0
9	FW	(Tunisia) TUN	Sofien Moussa	13	2	4+5	0	0	0	3+1	2
10	MF	(France) FRA	Elton Ngwatala	14	1	7+2	1	0	0	5	0
11	FW	(Senegal) SEN	Jean Alassane Mendy	11	2	3+3	0	0	0	5	2
14	FW	(England) ENG	Adil Nabi	14	1	6+7	1	0	0	1	0
15	DF	(England) ENG	Ryan Inniss	13	0	9+2	0	2	0	0	0
17	DF	(Scotland) SCO	Calvin Miller	16	1	15+1	1	0	0	0	0
20	FW	(Morocco) MAR	Faissal El Bakhtaoui	0	0	0	0	0	0	0	0
22	MF	(France) FRA	Karl Madianga	15	2	9+1	1	0	0	4+1	1
23	DF	(Republic of Ireland) IRL	Andy Boyle	13	1	11+2	1	0	0	0	0
28	FW	(Scotland) SCO	Lewis Spence	17	1	10+3	0	0	0	4	1
33	FW	(Scotland) SCO	Craig Wighton	8	1	0+3	0	0	0	4+1	1

=== Goal scorers ===
As of match played 18 May 2019

Ranking	Nation	Position	Number	Name	Scottish Premiership	Scottish Cup	Scottish League Cup	Total
1	FW	(Scotland)	9	Kenny Miller	8	0	0	8
2	FW	(England)	21	Andrew Nelson	4	0	0	4
3	FW	(Scotland)	10	Scott Wright	3	0	0	3
3	MF	(Scotland)	18	Paul McGowan	2	0	1	3
4	MF	(Scotland)	4	Martin Woods	2	0	0	2
4	FW	(Tunisia)	9	Sofien Moussa	0	0	2	2
4	FW	(Senegal)	11	Jean Alassane Mendy	0	0	2	2
4	MF	(England)	16	Ethan Robson	2	0	0	2
4	MF	(France)	22	Karl Madianga	1	0	1	2
4	MF	(Philippines)	27	Jesse Curran	1	1	0	2
5	MF	(Scotland)	2	Cammy Kerr	1	0	0	1
5	DF	(England)	3	Nathan Ralph	1	0	0	1
5	DF	(Angola)	5	Genseric Kusunga	1	0	0	1
5	MF	(France)	10	Elton Ngwatala	1	0	0	1
5	FW	(Finland)	14	Adil Nabi	1	0	0	1
5	DF	(Scotland)	17	Calvin Miller	1	0	0	1
5	MF	(Finland)	19	Benjamin Källman	1	0	0	1
5	DF	(Republic of Ireland)	23	Andy Boyle	1	0	0	1
5	FW	(Scotland)	28	Lewis Spence	0	0	1	1
5	FW	(Scotland)	33	Craig Wighton	0	0	1	1
TOTALS					31	1	8	40

== Club statistics ==
=== League table ===
Pos	Team	Pld	W	D	L	GF	GA	GD	Pts	Qualification or relegation (Note: Teams play each other three times (33 matches), before the league is split into two groups (the top six and the bottom six).)
8	Motherwell	38	15	6	17	46	56	−10	51	
9	Livingston	38	11	11	16	42	44	−2	44	
10	Hamilton Academical	38	9	6	23	28	75	−47	33	
11	St Mirren (O)	38	8	8	22	34	66	−32	32	Qualification for the Premiership play-off final
12	Dundee (R)	38	5	6	27	31	78	−47	21	Relegation to the Championship

Source: Soccerway BBC
Rules for classification: 1) Points; 2) Goal difference; 3) Goals scored; 4) Play-off (only if deciding champion, UEFA competitions qualification and second stage group allocation).
(O) Play-off winners; (R) Relegated

=== Group D table ===
Pos	Team	Pld	W	PW	PL	L	GF	GA	GD	Pts	Qualification	DNF	DND	BRE	STI	PET
1	Dunfermline Athletic (Q)	4	4	0	0	0	14	2	+12	12	Qualification for the Second round	—	—	—	3–1	3–0
2	Dundee (Q)	4	3	0	0	1	8	1	+7	9	Qualification for the Second round	0–1	—	2–0	—	—
3	Brechin City	4	1	0	1	2	3	10	−7	4		1–7	—	—	—	0–0p
4	Stirling Albion	4	1	0	0	3	4	9	−5	3		—	0–4	1–2	—	—
5	Peterhead	4	0	1	0	3	0	7	−7	2		—	0–2	—	0–2	—

Rules for classification: 1) goal difference, 2) goals scored, 3) away goals scored, 4) matches won, 5) away matches won, 6) drawing of lots.
(Q) Qualified to the phase indicated

=== Results by round ===
Round	1	2	3	4	5	6	7	8	9	10	11	12	13	14	15	16	17	18	19	20	21	22	23	24	25	26	27	28	29	30	31	32	33	34	35	36	37	38
Ground	A	H	A	H	A	H	A	H	A	H	H	A	H	A	H	H	A	A	A	H	H	A	H	A	H	A	H	A	H	H	A	A	H	A	A	H	A	H
Result	L	L	L	L	L	L	W	L	L	L	L	L	D	D	W	D	L	L	L	D	L	W	L	D	D	W	L	L	L	L	L	L	L	L	L	L	W	L
Position	8	11	12	12	12	12	12	12	12	12	12	12	12	12	11	12	12	12	12	12	12	11	11	11	11	10	10	11	11	11	12	12	12	12	12	12	12	12

Source: See results
A = Away; H = Home; W = Win; D = Draw; L = Loss

== Transfers ==
=== Players in ===
Player	From	Fee
(France) Elton Ngwatala	(England) Kidderminster Harriers	Free
(France) Karl Madianga	(Bulgaria) Lokomotiv GO	Free
(Scotland) Jack Hamilton	(Scotland) Hearts	Undisclosed
(England) Nathan Ralph	(England) Woking	Free
(Senegal) Jean Alassane Mendy	(Belgium) Sporting Lokeren	Free
(England) Adil Nabi	(England) Peterborough United	Free
(Scotland) Kenny Miller	(Scotland) Livingston	Free
(England) Craig Curran	(Scotland) Dundee United	Free
(England) Andrew Davies	(England) Hartlepool United	Free
(England) Andrew Nelson	(England) Sunderland	Undisclosed

=== Players out ===
Player	To	Fee
(Spain) Jon Aurtenetxe	(Spain) Amorebieta	Free
(Spain) Julen Etxabeguren	(Spain) Real Unión	Free
(Scotland) Kevin Holt	(Greece) Pafos	Free
(Scotland) Nicky Low	(Northern Ireland) Derry City	Free
(France) Jérémy Malherbe	(Greece) Panionios	Free
(Scotland) Mark O'Hara	(England) Peterborough United	Compensation
(Netherlands) Randy Wolters	(Netherlands) NEC Nijmegen	Free
(Bulgaria) Kostadin Gadzhalov	(Bulgaria) Botev Vratsa	Free
(France) Faissal El Bakhtaoui	(Scotland) Dunfermline Athletic	Free
(Scotland) Craig Wighton	(Scotland) Hearts	Undisclosed
(England) Steven Caulker	Unattached	Free
(England) Jordan Piggott	(Wales) Bangor City	Free
(England) Adil Nabi	(Greece) OFI	Free
(Scotland) Lewis Spence	(Scotland) Ross County	Free
(England) Roarie Deacon	(England) Sutton United	Free
(Finland) Glen Kamara	(Scotland) Rangers	£50,000
(France) Karl Madianga	Unattached	Free
(Senegal) Jean Alassane Mendy	Unattached	Free
(Tunisia) Sofien Moussa	(Romania) Concordia Chiajna	Free
(France) Elton Ngwatala	Unattached	Free
(Canada) Marcus Haber	(Canada) Pacific FC	Free

=== Loans in ===
Player	From	Fee
(Finland) Benjamin Kallman	(Finland) Inter Turku	Loan
(Republic of Ireland) Andy Boyle	(England) Preston North End	Loan
(England) Ryan Inniss	(England) Crystal Palace	Loan
(Scotland) Calvin Miller	(Scotland) Celtic	Loan
(Senegal) Seny Dieng	(England) Queen's Park Rangers	Loan
(England) Andy Dales	(England) Scunthorpe United	Loan
(Sweden) Andreas Hadenius	(Sweden) Halmstad	Loan
(England) James Horsfield	(England) Scunthorpe United	Loan
(Scotland) Scott Wright	(Scotland) Aberdeen	Loan
(Australia) Ryan McGowan	(England) Bradford City	Loan
(Republic of Ireland) John O'Sullivan	(England) Blackpool	Loan
(England) Ethan Robson	(England) Sunderland	Loan

=== Loans out ===
Player	From	Fee
(England) Calum Ferrie	(Scotland) Stirling Albion	Loan
(England) James Vincent	(Scotland) Dunfermline Athletic	Loan
(Scotland) Kerr Waddell	(Scotland) Greenock Morton	Loan
(Canada) Marcus Haber	(Scotland) Falkirk	Loan
(Wales) Daniel Jefferies	(Scotland) Partick Thistle	Loan
(England) Cedwyn Scott	(Scotland) Berwick Rangers	Loan
(Scotland) Matthew Henvey	(Scotland) Cowdenbeath	Loan
(England) Cedwyn Scott	(Scotland) Forfar Athletic	Loan

== End of season awards ==
=== Club Player of the Year awards ===
- Andrew De Vries Player of the Year: Nathan Ralph
- Isobel Sneddon Young Player of the Year: Callum Moore
- Players' Player of the Year: Nathan Ralph

== See also ==
- List of Dundee F.C. seasons
