= List of foreign Scottish Premiership players =

This is a list of foreign players in the Scottish Premiership, which commenced play in 2013. The following players meet both of the following criteria:

1. Have played at least one Scottish Premiership game. Players who were signed by Scottish Premiership clubs, but only played in lower league, cup and/or European games, or did not play in any competitive games at all, are not included.
2. Signed and played for a club following the dissolution of the SPL into the Scottish Premiership at the end of the 2012–2013 Scottish Premier League season. Players with careers overlapping both eras can be included, but only clubs played for during the Premiership era can be listed.
3. Are foreign, i.e., outside Great Britain and Ireland, determined by the following:

A player is considered foreign if his allegiance is not to play for the national teams of Scotland, England, Wales, Northern Ireland or the Republic of Ireland. (Note: More specifically, If a player has been capped on international level, the national team is used; if he has been capped by more than one country, the highest level (or the most recent) team is used. These include British/Irish players with dual citizenship.; If a player has not been capped on international level, his country of birth is used, except those who were born abroad from British/Irish parents or moved to Great Britain/Ireland at a young age, and those who clearly indicated to have switched his nationality to another nation.; Clubs listed are those which the player has played at least one Scottish Premiership game for.)

In bold: players who have played at least one Scottish Premiership game in the current season (2026–27), and are still at a club for which they have played. This does not include current players of a Scottish Premiership club who have not played a Scottish Premiership game in the current season.

As of 25 September 2026

== Albania ==
- Nedim Bajrami – Rangers – 2024–2026
- Flo Bojaj – Kilmarnock – 2016–17
- Eros Grezda – Rangers – 2018–20
- Egli Kaja – Livingston – 2018
- **Sabah Kerjota** – **Heart of Midlothian** – 2025–
- Ylber Ramadani – Aberdeen – 2022–2023

== Algeria ==
- **Badredine Bouanani** – **Rangers** – 2026–
- Ismaël Bouzid – Kilmarnock – 2013–14
- **Mehdi Merghem** – **Dundee United** – 2026–

== Angola ==
- Joaquim Adão – Heart of Midlothian – 2018
- Genséric Kusunga – Dundee – 2018–19
- Dolly Menga – Livingston – 2018–20

== Antigua and Barbuda ==
- Zaine Francis–Angol – Motherwell – 2013–15
- Josh Parker – Aberdeen – 2015–16

== Argentina ==
- Alexandro Bernabei – Celtic – 2022–2024
- Antonio Rojano – Hamilton Academical – 2017–18
- Adrián Spörle – Dundee United – 2020–22

== Australia ==
- Daniel Arzani – Celtic – 2018–2020
- Nathaniel Atkinson – Heart of Midlothian – 2021–24
- **Keanu Baccus** – **St Mirren** – 2022–24, 2025–
- Aziz Behich – Dundee United – 2022–2023
- **Daniel Bennie** – **Dundee United** – 2026–
- Mark Birighitti – Dundee United – 2022–2023
- **Martin Boyle** – Dundee, **Hibernian** – 2013–22, 2022–
- Oliver Bozanic – Heart of Midlothian – 2018–20
- Phillip Cancar – Livingston – 2022–2023
- **Jacob Chapman** – **St Mirren** – 2026–
- Jesse Curran – Dundee – 2015–19
- **Cameron Devlin** – Heart of Midlothian**, Rangers F.C.** – 2021–
- Ryan Edwards – Heart of Midlothian, Partick Thistle, St Mirren – 2015–19
- Ben Garuccio – Heart of Midlothian – 2018–20
- **Jake Girdwood-Reich** – **Motherwell** – 2026–
- Curtis Good – Dundee United – 2014
- **Jack Iredale** – **Hibernian** – 2024–
- Jackson Irvine – Celtic, Kilmarnock, Ross County – 2013–16
- James Jeggo – Hibernian – 2023–24
- Garang Kuol – Heart of Midlothian – 2023
- Aaron Lennox – Aberdeen – 2016–17
- Jamie Maclaren – Hibernian – 2018–19
- Ashley Maynard–Brewer – Ross County – 2021
- Scott McDonald – Motherwell, Dundee United – 2015–17, 2017–18
- Dylan McGowan – Heart of Midlothian – 2013–14
- **Ryan McGowan** – Dundee, Dundee United, St Johnstone, Livingston – 2015–16, 2019, 2022–2024, 2025–
- Nicolas Milanovic – Aberdeen – 2025–26
- Matthew Millar – St Mirren – 2021–22
- Lewis Miller – Hibernian – 2022–25
- Mark Milligan – Hibernian – 2018–2019
- Aaron Mooy – Celtic – 2022–2023
- Josh Nisbet – Ross County – 2024–25
- **Joshua Rawlins** – **Dundee United** – 2026–
- Tom Rogic – Celtic – 2013–22
- **Calem Nieuwenhof** – **Heart of Midlothian** – 2023
- Andy Rose – Motherwell – 2017–18
- **Lachlan Rose** – **Dundee United** – 2026–
- Kye Rowles – Heart of Midlothian – 2022–25
- **Zac Sapsford** – **Dundee United** – 2025–
- Harry Souttar – Dundee United and Ross County – 2015–16, 2018
- **Apostolos Stamatelopoulos** – **Motherwell** – 2024–
- **Ryan Strain** – **St Mirren, Dundee United** – 2022–
- **Ante Šuto** – **Hibernian** – 2025–
- Adam Taggart – Dundee United – 2015–16
- Nectarios Triantis – Hibernian – 2024–25
- **Kusini Yengi** – **Aberdeen** – 2025–
- Tete Yengi – Livingston – 2024, 2025–26

== Austria ==
- Oluwaseun Adewumi – Dundee – 2024–2025
- Daniel Bachmann – Ross County and Kilmarnock – 2015, 2018–19
- Moritz Bauer – Celtic – 2019–20
- Darko Bodul – Dundee United – 2015–16
- **Alexander Briedl** – **Aberdeen** – 2026–
- David Cancola – Ross County – 2021–2023
- **Lukas Fadinger** – **Motherwell** – 2025–
- Peter Haring – Heart of Midlothian – 2018–2024
- **Martin Moormann** – **Motherwell** – 2026–
- **Raphael Sallinger** – **Hibernian** – 2025–
- Sven Sprangler – St Johnstone – 2023–2025

== Belgium ==
- Logan Bailly – Celtic – 2015–17
- Boli Bolingoli–Mbombo – Celtic – 2019–20
- Dedryck Boyata – Celtic – 2015–19
- Allan Delferrière – Hibernian – 2022–24
- Jason Denayer – Celtic – 2014–15
- Lars Dendoncker – St Johnstone – 2021–22
- Tim Dreesen – Ross County – 2014
- Arne Engels – Celtic – 2024–2026
- Frédéric Frans – Partick Thistle – 2014–16
- **Elton Kabangu** – **Heart of Midlothian** – 2024–
- Charly Musonda – Celtic – 2018
- **Mitchy Ntelo** – **Aberdeen** – 2026–
- Funso Ojo – Aberdeen – 2019–21
- Kazeem Olaigbe – Ross County – 2022–2023
- Stéphane Oméonga – Hibernian, Livingston – 2019–2023
- **Nicolas Raskin** – **Rangers** – 2023–
- **Tuur Rommens** – **Rangers** – 2026–

== Bonaire ==
- Jort van der Sande – Dundee United – 2024–2025

== Bosnia and Herzegovina ==
- **Enes Alić** – **St Johnstone** – 2026–
- Bahrudin Atajić – Celtic – 2013–14
- Sanel Jahić – St Johnstone – 2013–14
- Nikola Katić – Rangers – 2018–20

== Brazil ==
- **Eduardo Ageu** – **Heart of Midlothian** – 2025–
- Alexandre D'Acol – Hamilton Academical – 2015–17
- Danilo – Rangers – 2023–2026
- Lucas – Hamilton Academical – 2015–16
- Igor Rossi – Heart of Midlothian – 2015–17

== Bulgaria ==
- Kostadin Gadzhalov – Dundee – 2015–18
- Viktor Genev – St Mirren – 2015
- Plamen Krachunov – St Johnstone – 2016
- **Dimitar Mitov** – St Johnstone – 2023–24, **Aberdeen** – 2024–
- Aleksandar Tonev – Celtic – 2014–15

== Burkina Faso ==
- **Pierre Landry Kabore** – **Heart of Midlothian** – 2025–

== Burundi ==
- Gaël Bigirimana – Motherwell, Hibernian – 2017–19

== Cameroon ==
- Stéphane Bahoken – St Mirren – 2013–14
- Eric Djemba–Djemba – St Mirren – 2014
- Arnaud Djoum – Heart of Midlothian, Dundee United – 2015–19, 2022–2023
- Jeando Fuchs – Dundee United – 2020–22
- Yann Songo'o – Ross County – 2014

== Canada ==
- Scott Arfield – Rangers – 2018–23
- Theo Bair – St Johnstone, Motherwell – 2022–24
- **Ethan Brown – Kilmarnock** – 2025–
- Dylan Carreiro – Dundee – 2014–15
- Jay Chapman – Dundee – 2022
- Terry Dunfield – Ross County – 2014–15
- Calum Ferguson – Inverness Caledonian Thistle – 2015–16
- Marcus Godinho – Heart of Midlothian – 2018–19
- **Owen Goodman** – **Dundee** – 2026–
- Marcus Haber – Dundee – 2016–19
- Junior Hoilett – Aberdeen – 2023–24
- **Jamie Knight-Lebel** – **Motherwell** – 2026–
- Victor Loturi – Ross County – 2022–25
- **Alistair Johnston** – **Celtic** – 2023–
- Liam Millar – Kilmarnock – 2019–20
- Harry Paton – Ross County, Motherwell – 2018–22, 2023–25
- Ben Paton – Ross County – 2021–24
- Charlie Trafford – Hamilton Academical – 2020–21
- David Wotherspoon – St Johnstone – 2013–23
- Dario Zanatta – Heart of Midlothian – 2015–19

== Cape Verde ==
- **Luís 'Duk' Lopes** – **Aberdeen** – 2022–
- David Silva – Kilmarnock – 2013–14

== Chinese Taipei ==
- Tim Chow – Ross County – 2016–18

== Colombia ==
- **Óscar Cortés** – **Rangers** – 2024–
- **Camilo Durán** – **Celtic** – 2026–
- Cristian Montaño – Livingston – 2021–24, 2025–26
- Alfredo Morelos – Rangers – 2017–2023
- Andrés Salazar – Heart of Midlothian – 2024–2025

== Comoros ==
- Myziane Maolida – Hibernian – 2024

== Congo ==
- Loick Ayina – Dundee United, Ross County – 2023, 2024
- Dylan Bahamboula – Livingston – 2022–24
- Scott Bitsindou – Livingston – 2022–24
- Clévid Dikamona – Heart of Midlothian – 2018–
- Michee Efete – Ross County – 2023–25

== Congo DR ==
- Beni Baningime – Heart of Midlothian – 2021–2026
- **Rocky Bushiri** – **Hibernian** – 2024–
- Youssouf Mulumbu – Celtic, Kilmarnock – 2017–19
- Andréa Mbuyi–Mutombo – Inverness Caledonian Thistle – 2015–16
- **Aaron Tshibola** – **Kilmarnock** – 2018–19, 2020–21, 2026–
- Delphin Tshiembe – Hamilton Academical – 2018–19
- Calvin Zola – Aberdeen – 2013–14

== Costa Rica ==
- Cristian Gamboa – Celtic – 2016–19
- Kenneth Vargas – Heart of Midlothian – 2023–25
- Gerald Taylor – Heart of Midlothian – 2024–25

== Croatia ==
- Borna Barišić – Rangers – 2018–24
- Filip Benković – Celtic – 2018–19
- Marijan Cabraja – Hibernian – 2022–2023
- Antonio Čolak – Rangers – 2022–2023
- Ivan Dolček – Dundee United – 2025
- Josip Juranović – Celtic – 2021–2023
- Christian Ilić – Motherwell – 2019–20
- Niko Kranjčar – Rangers – 2016–18
- **Božo Mikulić** – **St. Johnstone** – 2024–25, 2026–
- Vicko Ševelj – Dundee United – 2025
- Jozo Šimunović – Celtic – 2015–20

== Curaçao ==
- Kemy Agustien – Hamilton Academical – 2016
- Juninho Bacuna – Rangers – 2021–22

== Cyprus ==
- **Alex Gogić** – Hamilton Academical, **St Mirren** – 2017–

== Czech Republic ==
- Tomáš Černý – Partick Thistle, Aberdeen – 2015–21
- Vaclav Čerńy – Rangers – 2024–2025
- Václav Hladký – St Mirren – 2019–20
- Milan Nitrianský – Partick Thistle – 2017–2018
- Nicolas Šumský – Hamilton Academical – 2015–16
- Filip Twardzik – Celtic – 2013–15
- Zdeněk Zlámal – Heart of Midlothian, St Mirren, St Johnstone – 2018–21

== Denmark ==
- Oliver Abildgaard – Celtic – 2022–23
- Danny Amankwaa – Hearts – 2018–19
- Mika Biereth – Motherwell – 2023–24
- Nicolai Brock–Madsen – St Mirren – 2018
- **Tochi Chukwuani** – **Rangers** – 2025–
- **Julius Eskesen** – **Dundee United** – 2025–
- Stefan Gartenmann – Aberdeen – 2023–24
- **Kasper Høgh** – **Celtic** – 2026–
- **Alexander Jensen** – **Aberdeen** – 2024–
- Emiliano Marcondes – Hibernian – 2023–24
- Thomas Mikkelsen – Ross County – 2017–18
- Jeppe Okkels – Aberdeen – 2024–25
- Matt O'Riley – Celtic – 2022–24
- Kasper Schmeichel – Celtic – 2024–26
- Erik Sviatchenko – Celtic – 2016–18

== Dominican Republic ==
- Luiyi de Lucas – Livingston – 2023–24

== Ecuador ==
- **José Cifuentes** – **Rangers** – 2023–

== Egypt ==
- **Haissem Hassan** – **Celtic** – 2026–

== Estonia ==
- Henri Anier – Dundee United, Inverness Caledonian Thistle, Motherwell – 2013–14, 2015–16, 2017
- Mattias Käit – Ross County – 2018
- Henrik Ojamaa – Dundee, Motherwell – 2014–15, 2017
- **Michael Schjønning-Larsen** – Kilmarnock – 2025–
- Madis Vihmann – St Johnstone – 2019–20

== Faroe Islands ==
- Gunnar Nielsen – Motherwell – 2013–15

== Finland ==
- Serge Atakayi – Rangers – 2016–2019
- Alexei Eremenko – Kilmarnock – 2014–15
- Carljohan Eriksson – Dundee United – 2022–2023
- Niko Hämäläinen – Kilmarnock – 2019–2020
- Richard Jensen – Aberdeen – 2023–2025
- Glen Kamara – Dundee, Rangers – 2017–2023
- Topi Keskinen – Aberdeen – 2024–26
- Ilmari Niskanen – Dundee United – 2021–2023
- Juhani Ojala – Motherwell – 2021–
- Teemu Pukki – Celtic – 2013–14
- Riku Riski – Dundee United – 2016
- **Viljami Sinisalo** – **Celtic** – 2024–
- Eetu Vertainen – St Johnstone – 2021

== France ==
- Tony Andreu – Hamilton Academical, St Mirren, St Johnstone – 2014–15, 2019–21
- **Amadou Ba-Sy** – **Heart of Midlothian** – 2026–
- Maxime Biamou – Dundee United – 2021–22
- Dylan Bikey – Heart of Midlothian – 2017
- Loïc Damour – Heart of Midlothian – 2019–21
- Moussa Dembélé – Celtic – 2016–18
- Oumar Diaby – Hamilton Academical – 2016
- Oan Djorkaeff – St Mirren – 2019–20
- Christopher Dilo – St Mirren – 2013–14
- Odsonne Édouard – Celtic – 2017–21
- Farid El Alagui – Dundee United – 2014
- Faissal El Bakhtaoui – Dundee – 2016–19
- Kévin Gomis – Dundee – 2016–17
- William Gros – Kilmarnock – 2013–14
- Christopher Jullien – Celtic – 2019–
- Billy Koumetio – Dundee – 2024–26
- Karl Madianga – Dundee – 2018–19
- Malaury Martin – Heart of Midlothian – 2017–19
- **Laurent Mendy** – **Heart of Midlothian** – 2026–
- David Milinković – Heart of Midlothian – 2017–18
- Steven Mouyokolo – Celtic – 2013–14
- Christian Nadé – Hamilton Academical – 2015–16
- Aaron Nemane – Rangers – 2017
- David Ngog – Ross County – 2018
- Elton Ngwatala – Dundee – 2018–19
- Olivier Ntcham – Celtic – 2017–21
- Cécé Pepe – Livingston – 2019–20
- Florent Sinama Pongolle – Dundee United – 2015–16
- **Tom Renaud** – **Heart of Midlothian** – 2026–
- Christopher Routis – Ross County – 2016–18
- Mohamed Sylla – Dundee, Livingston – 2023–26
- Xavier Tomas – Hamilton Academical – 2017–18
- Julien Vetro – Dundee – 2024–25
- Élie Youan – Hibernian – 2022–26
- Abdellah Zoubir – Hibernian – 2013–14

== Gambia ==
- Momodou Bojang – Hibernian – 2022–23
- Adama Sidibeh – St Johnstone – 2024–25

== Germany ==
- **Mika Baur** – **Celtic** – 2026–
- Adrian Beck – Hamilton Academical – 2019–20
- **Ryan Naderi** – **Rangers** – 2026–
- Nicolas Kühn – Celtic – 2024–25
- Sean Goss – Rangers, St Johnstone, Motherwell – 2018, 2019, 2021–23
- Moritz Jenz – Celtic – 2022–23
- Orestis Kiomourtzoglou – Heart of Midlothian – 2022–23
- Thomas Konrad – Dundee – 2014–16
- Gramoz Kurtaj – Hamilton Academical – 2015–17
- **Jonathan Meier** – **Kilmarnock** – 2026–
- **Marius Müller** – **Aberdeen** – 2026–
- **Felix Passlack** – **Hibernian** – 2026–
- Arvid Schenk – Dundee – 2014–15
- **Danny Schmidt** – **St Johnstone** – 2026–
- **Alexander Schwolow** – **Heart of Midlothian** – 2025–
- Lennard Sowah – Hamilton Academical, Heart of Midlothian – 2016–17, 2018–19
- Luka Tankulić – Dundee – 2014–15
- Dan Twardzik – Motherwell – 2013–16
- Luis Zwick – Dundee United – 2015–16

== Ghana ==
- **Emmanuel Agyei** – **Dundee United** – 2025–
- **Jordan Amissah** – **Ross County** – 2024–
- Mathew Anim Cudjoe – Dundee United – 2021–23
- Prince Buaben – Heart of Midlothian and Partick Thistle – 2014, 2015–18
- Joe Dodoo – Rangers – 2016–19
- **Aaron Essel** – **St Johnstone** – 2024–
- Abdul Osman – Partick Thistle – 2014–18
- Isaac Pappoe – Dundee United – 2025–
- Mubarak Wakaso – Celtic – 2014–15
- Jojo Wollacott – Hibernian – 2023–24

== Greece ==
- Tasos Avlonitis – Heart of Midlothian – 2016–17
- Vasilis Barkas – Celtic – 2020–22
- Giorgos Giakoumakis – Celtic – 2021–2023
- Evangelos Ikonomou – Ross County – 2014
- Marios Ogkmpoe – Hamilton Academical – 2018–21
- Georgios Samaras – Celtic – 2013–14
- Georgios Sarris – Hamilton Academical – 2016–18
- Giannis Skondras – Hamilton Academical – 2016–18
- Alexandros Tziolis – Heart of Midlothian – 2017

== Grenada ==
- **Regan Charles–Cook** – Ross County, **Motherwell** – 2020–22, 2025–
- Anthony Straker – Motherwell – 2015

== Guadeloupe ==
- Mickaël Antoine–Curier – Hamilton Academical – 2014–15

== Guinea ==
- Lonsana Doumbouya – Inverness Caledonian Thistle – 2016–17
- Mathias Pogba – Partick Thistle – 2015–16
- Ibrahima Savane – Livingston – 2019

== Guinea–Bissau ==
- Amido Baldé– Celtic – 2013–15
- **Panutche Camará** – **Dundee United** – 2025–
- **Esmaël Gonçalves** – Heart of Midlothian, **Livingston** – 2017–18, 2022–

== Guyana ==
- Nathan Moriah–Welsh – Hibernian – 2024–25

== Honduras ==
- Emilio Izaguirre – Celtic – 2013–17, 2018–19
- Luis Palma – Celtic – 2023–25

== Hungary ==
- Ádám Bogdán – Hibernian – 2018–19
- Kriszrian Keresztes – Dundee United – 2025

== Iceland ==
- Kári Árnason – Aberdeen – 2017–18
- **Tómas Bent Magnússon** – **Heart of Midlothian** – 2025–

== Indonesia ==
- Marc Klok – Dundee, Ross County – 2013–14, 2017

== Iran ==
- Alex Samizadeh – Kilmarnock – 2017–18

== Iraq ==
- **Zidane Iqbal** – Dundee United – 2026–
- Dario Naamo – Dundee United – 2025

== Israel ==
- Liel Abada – Celtic – 2021–24
- Hatem Abd Elhamed – Celtic – 2019–21
- Nir Bitton – Celtic – 2013–22
- Or Dadia – Aberdeen – 2023–24
- Beram Kayal – Celtic – 2013–15
- David Keltjens – St. Johnstone – 2024–25
- Ofir Marciano – Hibernian – 2017–21
- Guy Melamed – St Johnstone – 2020–21
- Stav Nahmani – St Mirren – 2023–24

== Italy ==
- Raffaele De Vita – Livingston and Ross County – 2015–16, 2018–19
- Dario Del Fabro – Kilmarnock – 2019–20
- Massimo Donati – Hamilton Academical and St Mirren – 2016–18
- Manuel Pascali – Kilmarnock – 2013–15

== Ivory Coast ==
- Vakoun Issouf Bayo – Celtic – 2019–20
- Souleymane Coulibaly – Kilmarnock – 2016–17
- Guy Demel – Dundee United – 2015–16
- **Mohamed Diomande** – **Rangers** – 2024–
- Armand Gnanduillet – Heart of Midlothian – 2021–22
- Cédric Kipré – Motherwell – 2017–18
- Eboue Kouassi – Celtic – 2017–2020
- Ismaila Soro – Celtic – 2020–22
- Kolo Toure – Celtic – 2016–17
- **Abdoulaye Yoro** – **Dundee United** – 2026–

== Jamaica ==
- Rolando Aarons – Motherwell – 2020, 2022
- **Dexter Lembikisa** – **Heart of Midlothian** – 2024–
- Richard King – St Mirren – 2025
- Junior Morias – St Mirren – 2019–21
- Theo Robinson – Motherwell – 2015–16
- Kemar Roofe – Rangers – 2020–24

== Japan ==
- Kyogo Furuhashi – Celtic – 2021–25
- Reo Hatate – Celtic – 2022–26
- Yosuke Ideguchi – Celtic – 2022–24
- Tomoki Iwata – Celtic – 2023–24
- Eiji Kawashima – Dundee United – 2015–16
- Yuki Kobayashi – Celtic – 2023–24
- Daizen Maeda – Celtic – 2022–26
- Ryotaro Meshino – Heart of Midlothian – 2019–20
- Yutaro Oda – Heart of Midlothian – 2023–25
- Kyosuke Tagawa – Heart of Midlothian – 2023–24
- **Daisuke Yokota** – **Rangers** – 2026–

== Kenya ==
- **Jonah Ayunga** – **St Mirren** – 2022–
- Richard Odada – Dundee United – 2024–25

== Kosovo ==
- Florent Hoti – Dundee United – 2020–22

== Latvia ==
- Antons Kurakins – Hamilton Academical – 2015–16
- Vitālijs Maksimenko – Kilmarnock – 2014
- **Deniss Meļņiks** – **Falkirk** – 2026–
- **Kristers Tobers** – **Aberdeen** – 2024–

== Liberia ==
- Nohan Kenneh – Hibernian, Ross County – 2022–23, 2023, 2025
- Mohammed Sangare – Livingston – 2023–24

== Lithuania ==
- Deivydas Matulevičius – Hibernian – 2017–18
- Deimantas Petravičius – Motherwell – 2017–18
- Darvydas Šernas – Ross County – 2015
- Vykintas Slivka – Hibernian – 2017–20

== Malta ==
- Myles Beerman – Rangers – 2016–19
- James Brown – Livingston, St Johnstone – 2018–19, 2021–24

== Malawi ==
- Kieran Ngwenya – Aberdeen – 2020–21

== Mali ==
- Lassana Coulibaly – Rangers – 2018–19

== Martinique ==
- Yoann Arquin – Ross County, St Mirren – 2014–15
- Julien Faubert – Kilmarnock – 2016

== Mauritania ==
- **Djeidi Gassama** – Rangers – 2025–

== Mexico ==
- Gabriel – Partick Thistle – 2013–14
- Eduardo Herrera – Rangers – 2017–20
- Carlos Peña – Rangers – 2017–19
- Juan Antonio Portales – Dundee – 2023–25
- Diego Pineda – Dundee – 2023–24

== Moldova ==
- **Nicky Cleșcenco** – **Kilmarnock** – 2025–
- **Iurie Iovu** – **Dundee United** – 2025–

== Montenegro ==
- Sead Hakšabanović – Celtic – 2022–23
- Slobodan Rubežić – Aberdeen – 2023–24

== Montserrat ==
- Donervon Daniels – Aberdeen – 2015

== Morocco ==
- Moha El Ouriachi – Heart of Midlothian – 2017
- **Ayoub Mouloua** – **Aberdeen** – 2026–
- Faycal Rherras – Heart of Midlothian and Hibernian – 2016–17, 2018

== Netherlands ==
- **Nikolas Agrafiotis** – **St Mirren** – 2026–
- **Jordi Altena** – **Heart of Midlothian** – 2025–
- Jordi Balk – Ross County – 2014
- Vicente Besuijen – Aberdeen – 2022–25
- Mario Bilate – Dundee United – 2014–15
- Derk Boerrigter – Celtic – 2013–16
- Melvin de Leeuw – Ross County – 2013–14
- Dorus de Vries – Celtic – 2016–19
- Mohamed El Makrini – Kilmarnock – 2019–20
- **Bert Esselink** – **Dundee United** – 2025–
- Jeremie Frimpong – Celtic – 2019–21
- Nigel Hasselbaink – Hamilton Academical and St Johnstone – 2013–14, 2015
- Justin Johnson – Dundee United – 2015–16
- Neraysho Kasanwirjo – Rangers – 2024–25
- **Mats Knoester** – **Aberdeen** – 2024–
- Sam Lammers – Rangers – 2023–24
- Kevin Luckassen – Ross County – 2013–14
- Darren Maatsen – Ross County – 2013–15
- Victor Nirennold – Motherwell – 2021–22
- Robin Pröpper – Rangers – 2024–25
- **Beau Reus** – **Heart of Midlothian** – 2026–
- Kelle Roos – Aberdeen – 2022–24
- Alex Schalk – Ross County – 2015–18
- Sherwin Seedorf – Motherwell – 2019–21
- Rodney Sneijder – Dundee United – 2015
- Yordi Teijsse – Dundee – 2016–17
- Jeroen Tesselaar – Kilmarnock and St Mirren – 2013–15
- Kenny van der Weg – Hamilton Academical and Ross County – 2016–18, 2019
- Virgil van Dijk – Celtic – 2013–15
- Kevin van Veen – Motherwell, Kilmarnock, St Mirren – 2021–2023, 2024
- Randy Wolters – Dundee – 2017–18

== New Zealand ==
- Rory Fallon – St Johnstone – 2013–14
- Alex Greive – St Mirren – 2022–2024
- Elijah Just – Motherwell – 2025–26
- James McGarry – Aberdeen – 2023–25
- **Alex Paulsen** – **Motherwell** – 2026–
- **Jesse Randall** – **Dundee United** – 2026–
- **George Stanger** – Hamilton Academical, **Kilmarnock** – 2018–21, 2025–

== Nigeria ==
- Ola Adeyemo – Dundee United – 2014–15
- **Afeez Aremu** – **Aberdeen** – 2026–
- Efe Ambrose – Celtic and Hibernian – 2013–19
- Peter Ambrose – Aberdeen – 2024–26
- Joe Aribo – Rangers – 2019–22
- Leon Balogun – Rangers – 2020–22
- Calvin Bassey – Rangers – 2020–22
- Cyriel Dessers – Rangers – 2023–25
- **Andrew Fasanya** – **Aberdeen** – 2026–
- **Emmanuel Fernandez** – **Rangers** – 2025–
- Reuben Gabriel – Kilmarnock – 2013–14
- Rabiu Ibrahim – Kilmarnock – 2013–14
- Chidiebere Nwakali – Aberdeen – 2018
- Edward Ofere – Inverness Caledonian Thistle, Dundee United – 2015, 2016
- Juwon Oshaniwa – Heart of Midlothian – 2015–17
- Umar Sadiq – Rangers – 2018
- **Ibrahim Said** – **Motherwell** – 2025–

== North Macedonia ==
- David Babunski – Dundee United – 2024–2025
- **Bojan Miovski** – Aberdeen, **Rangers** – 2022–24, 2025–
- Davor Zdravkovski – Motherwell – 2023–25
- Kristijan Trapanovski – Dundee United – 2024–

== Norway ==
- Thelo Aasgaard – Rangers – 2025–26
- Torbjørn Agdestein – Inverness Caledonian Thistle – 2013–14
- Kristoffer Ajer – Celtic, Kilmarnock – 2017–21
- Jo Inge Berget – Celtic – 2014
- **Eythor Bjørgolfsson** – **Motherwell** – 2026–
- **Christian Borchgrevink** – **Heart of Midlothian** – 2025–
- Fredrik Brustad – Hamilton Academical – 2018–19
- Mohamed Elyounoussi – Celtic – 2019–21
- Markus Fjørtoft – Hamilton Academical – 2019–20
- Niklas Gunnarsson – Hibernian – 2016
- Runar Hauge – Hibernian – 2021–22
- Odin Thiago Holm – Celtic – 2023–25
- Sondre Solholm Johansen – Motherwell – 2021–23
- Sander Kartum – Heart of Midlothian – 2025–26
- Elias Melkersen – Hibernian – 2022–23
- Jean Alassane Mendy – Dundee – 2018–19
- Stefan Johansen – Celtic – 2014–2016
- Bjørn Johnsen – Heart of Midlothian – 2016–17
- Sivert Heltne Nilsen – Aberdeen – 2024–26

== Palestine ==
- Oday Dabbagh – Aberdeen – 2025

== Poland ==
- Błażej Augustyn – Heart of Midlothian – 2015–16
- Max Boruc – Hibernian – 2023–24
- Radosław Cierzniak – Dundee United – 2013–15
- Kevin Dąbrowski – Hibernian – 2021–22
- Jarosław Fojut – Dundee United – 2014–15
- Franciszek Franczak – St Johnstone – 2023–26
- Rafał Grzelak – Heart of Midlothian – 2017–18
- Patryk Klimala – Celtic – 2019–21
- Kacper Łopata – Ross County – 2024–25
- Maik Nawrocki – Celtic – 2023–24
- Krystian Nowak – Heart of Midlothian – 2016–17
- **Max Stryjek** – Livingston, **Kilmarnock** – 2020–22, 2025–
- Michał Szromnik – Dundee United – 2014–16
- Łukasz Załuska – Celtic – 2013–15

== Portugal ==
- Bruno Alves – Rangers – 2017–18
- Paulo Bernardo – Celtic – 2023–26
- **Claudio Braga** – **Heart of Midlothian** – 2025–
- Daniel Candeias – Rangers – 2017–19
- Fábio Cardoso – Rangers – 2017–18
- **Youssef Chermiti** – **Rangers** – 2025–
- Dálcio – Rangers – 2017
- **Jota** – **Celtic** – 2021–23, 2024–
- Joel Castro Pereira – Heart of Midlothian – 2019–20
- Fábio Silva – Rangers – 2024
- Jair Tavares – Hibernian, Motherwell – 2022–25

== Romania ==
- Laurențiu Brănescu – Kilmarnock – 2019–20
- Laurențiu Corbu – St Mirren – 2019
- **Kevin Ciubotaru** – **Dundee United** – 2026–
- Ianis Hagi – Rangers – 2020–25
- Mihai Popescu – St Mirren – 2019

== Russia ==
- Ivan Konovalov – Livingston – 2022–23

== Saint Kitts and Nevis ==
- Michael Nottingham – Livingston – 2023–25
- Harry Panayiotou – Livingston – 2021
- **Jayden Richardson** – Aberdeen, **St Mirren** – 2022–23, 2025–

== Senegal ==
- Morgaro Gomis – Dundee United, Heart of Midlothian, Motherwell – 2013–16
- Pape Habib Guèye – Aberdeen – 2023–25
- Jean Alassane Mendy – Dundee – 2018–19
- Abdallah Sima – Rangers – 2023–24
- Pape Souaré – Motherwell – 2023–24

== Serbia ==
- **Vanja Dragojević** – **Rangers** – 2026–
- **Kosta Nedeljković** – **Rangers** – 2026–
- Stefan Šćepović – Celtic – 2014–16

== Sierra Leone ==
- **Azeem Abdulai** – **Hibernian** – 2026–
- Amadou Bakayoko – Dundee – 2023–24
- Mustapha Dumbuya – Partick Thistle – 2015–18
- **MJ Kamson-Kamara** – **Kilmarnock** – 2026–

== Slovakia ==
- Erik Čikoš – Ross County – 2014, 2016–17
- Marián Kello – St Mirren – 2013–15
- Filip Kiss – Ross County – 2014–15
- Milan Lalkovič – Ross County – 2017
- Pavol Šafranko – Dundee United – 2019
- Peter Urminsky – St Mirren – 2022–23

== Slovenia ==
- Uroš Celcer – Ross County – 2014
- **Ester Sokler** – **Aberdeen** – 2023–
- Andraž Struna – Heart of Midlothian – 2017
- **Žan Bešir** – **Dundee** – 2026–

== South Africa ==
- Keaghan Jacobs – Livingston – 2018–22
- Kyle Jacobs – Kilmarnock – 2013–14
- **Olwethu Makhanya** – **Rangers** – 2026–
- Bongani Zungu – Rangers – 2020–21

== South Korea ==
- Oh Hyeon-gyu – Celtic – 2023–24
- **Yang Hyun-jun** – **Celtic** – 2023–
- Kwon Hyeok-kyu – St Mirren, Hibernian – 2024–25
- **Kim Min-su** – **Rangers** – 2026–

== South Sudan ==
- William Akio – Ross County – 2022–23

== Suriname ==
- **Djenairo Daniels** – **Kilmarnock** – 2026–
- Dylan Vente – Hibernian – 2023–24

== Spain ==
- Arturo – Dundee – 2016
- Jon Aurtenetxe – Dundee – 2017–18
- Musa Drammeh – Heart of Midlothian – 2024–25
- Julen Etxabeguren – Dundee – 2015–18
- Jesús García – Hamilton Academical – 2013–17
- Juanma – Heart of Midlothian – 2015–17
- Dani López – Inverness Caledonian Thistle – 2015–16
- Eliezer Mayenda – Hibernian – 2024
- Rubén Palazuelos – Ross County – 2015
- Miguel Pallardó – Heart of Midlothian – 2014–16
- **Samuel Ramos** – **St Mirren** – 2026–
- Antonio Reguero – Ross County – 2014–15
- Alex Rodriguez – Motherwell – 2018–19
- Jon Toral – Rangers – 2017
- Álex Valle – Celtic – 2024–25

== Sweden ==
- Amar Fatah – Dundee United – 2025–
- John Guidetti – Celtic – 2014–15
- Melker Hallberg – Hibernian, St Johnstone – 2019–2023
- Filip Helander – Rangers – 2019–23
- **Jardell Kanga** – **Motherwell** – 2026–
- David Moberg Karlsson – Kilmarnock – 2014
- Benjamin Mbunga Kimpioka – St Johnstone – 2024–25
- Gustaf Lagerbielke – Celtic – 2023–24
- Mikael Lustig – Celtic – 2013–19
- Viktor Noring – Heart of Midlothian – 2016–18
- **Benjamin Nygren** – **Celtic** – 2025–
- **Erik Ring** – **Kilmarnock** – 2026–
- Osman Sow – Heart of Midlothian, Kilmarnock – 2014–16, 2019–21
- Carl Starfelt – Celtic – 2021–2023

== Switzerland ==
- Albian Ajeti – Celtic – 2020–
- **Bradley Fink** – **Dundee** – 2026–
- Saidy Janko – Celtic – 2015–17
- Florian Kamberi – Hibernian – 2018–20
- Mihael Kovačević – Ross County – 2013–14
- Branislav Mićić – Ross County – 2013–14
- Orhan Mustafi – Ross County – 2013–14
- Philippe Senderos – Rangers – 2016–17
- Benjamin Siegrist – Dundee United, Celtic – 2018–22, 2022–24
- **Willy Vogt** – **Motherwell** – 2026–

== Togo ==
- **Thibault Klidjé** – **Hibernian** – 2025–
- Steve Lawson – Livingston – 2018–21
- **Idjessi Metsoko** – **Dundee United** – 2026–

== Trinidad and Tobago ==
- Daniel Phillips – St Johnstone – 2022–24
- Andre Raymond – St Johnstone – 2024–25
- Richard Roy – Hamilton Academical – 2016–17
- Kieran Ngwenya – Aberdeen – 2020–21
- Jason Scotland – Hamilton Academical – 2014–15

== Tunisia ==
- Sofien Moussa – Dundee – 2017–19
- Aymen Souda – Livingston – 2019–20
- **Sebastian Tounekti** – **Celtic** – 2025–

== Turkey ==
- Nadir Çiftçi – Celtic, Dundee United and Motherwell – 2013–18
- İlkay Durmuş – St Mirren – 2019–21
- Colin Kazim–Richards – Celtic – 2016
- Alim Öztürk – Heart of Midlothian – 2014–17
- **Rıdvan Yılmaz** – **Rangers** – 2022–

== Uganda ==
- Sadat Anaku – Dundee United – 2022–2023
- Elvis Bwomono – St Mirren, Aberdeen – 2023–25, 2026
- **Rogers Mato** – **Heart of Midlothian** – 2026–
- Bevis Mugabi – Motherwell – 2019–24
- **Jordan Obita** – **Hibernian** – 2023–

== Ukraine ==
- Yevhen Kucherenko – Dundee United – 2025–2026
- Max Kucheriavyi – St Johnstone – 2022–25
- Mykola Kukharevych – Hibernian – 2022–2023, 2024–25
- Marian Shved – Celtic – 2019

== United States ==
- **Matai Akinmboni** – **Dundee** – 2026–
- **Cameron Carter–Vickers** – **Celtic** – 2021–
- Joseph Efford – Motherwell – 2022–23
- **CJ Fodrey** – **Falkirk** – 2026–
- Ian Harkes – Dundee United – 2020–23
- Matthew Hoppe – Hibernian – 2023
- Emerson Hyndman – Rangers, Hibernian – 2017–18
- Perry Kitchen – Hearts – 2016–17
- Chris Mueller – Hibernian – 2022
- **Jacob Murrell** – **Falkirk** – 2026–
- Matt Polster – Rangers – 2019–20
- **Dante Polvara** – **Aberdeen** – 2022–26
- Christian Ramirez – Aberdeen – 2021–23
- James Sands – Rangers – 2022–23
- Sebastian Soto – Livingston F.C. – 2021–22
- Malik Tillman – Rangers – 2022–23
- **Auston Trusty** – **Celtic** – 2024–
- **JJ Williams** – **Heart of Midlothian** – 2026–

== Uruguay ==
- Diego Laxalt – Celtic – 2020–21

== Venezuela ==
- Ronald Hernández – Aberdeen – 2020–21
- **Kevin Kelsy** – **Rangers** – 2026–
- Miku – Celtic F.C. – 2012–13

== Zambia ==
- **Miguel Chaiwa** – **Hibernian** – 2026–
- Fashion Sakala – Rangers – 2021–2023

== Zimbabwe ==
- Kundai Benyu – Celtic – 2017
- **Tawanda Maswanhise** – **Motherwell** – 2024–
- David Moyo – Hamilton Academical – 2019–21

== See also ==
- List of foreign Scottish Premier League players

== Notes ==
1. Born in Algeria
2. Born in Angola (then Portuguese Angola)
3. Born in Argentina
4. Born in Australia
5. Born in Austria
6. Born in Burundi
7. Born in Belgium
8. Born in Bosnia and Herzegovina (then part of Yugoslavia)
9. Born in Brazil
10. Born in the Central African Republic
11. Born in Canada
12. Born in Cameroon
13. Born in Cape Verde
14. Born in Colombia
15. Born in Croatia (then part of Yugoslavia)
16. Born in Curaçao (constituent country of the Kingdom of the Netherlands [then part of the Netherlands Antilles])
17. Born in Czech Republic (then part of Czech and Slovak Federative Republic)
18. Born in Denmark
19. Born in Dominican Republic
20. Born in Egypt
21. Born in England
22. Born in France
23. Born in the French Guiana (Overseas department of the French Republic)
24. Born in West Germany (now part of Germany)
25. Born in Guinea-Bissau
26. Born in Germany
27. Born in Ghana
28. Born in Guadeloupe (Overseas department of the French Republic)
29. Born in Greenland (autonomous country within the Kingdom of Denmark)
30. Born in French Guiana (Overseas department of the French Republic)
31. Born in Italy
32. Born in the Ivory Coast
33. Born in Jamaica
34. Born in Kenya
35. Born in Kosovo (then part of Yugoslavia
36. Born in Liberia
37. Born in Morocco
38. Born in North Macedonia
39. Born in North Macedonia (then Macedonia, part of Yugoslavia)
40. Born in Mozambique (then Portuguese Mozambique)
41. Born in Martinique (Overseas department of the French Republic)
42. Born in New Caledonia (Overseas territory of the French Republic)
43. Born in the Netherlands
44. Born in Nigeria
45. Born in Northern Ireland
46. Born in Poland
47. Born in Portugal
48. Born in Réunion (Overseas department of the French Republic)
49. Born in South Africa
50. Born in Russia (then part of Soviet Union)
51. Born in São Tomé and Príncipe
52. Born in South Africa
53. Born in Scotland
54. Born in Senegal
55. Born in Slovakia
56. Born in Somalia
57. Born in Spain
58. Born in Singapore
59. Born in Serbia (then part of Yugoslavia)
60. Born in Switzerland
61. Born in Suriname
62. Born in Suriname (then part of the Kingdom of the Netherlands)
63. Born in Slovakia (then part of Czechoslovakia)
64. Born in Slovenia (then part of Yugoslavia)
65. Born in Sweden
66. Born in Turkey
67. Born in Uganda
68. Born in Ukraine (then part of the Soviet Union)
69. Born in the United States
70. Born in Uzbekistan (then part of the Soviet Union)
71. Born in the Democratic Republic of Congo (then Zaïre)
72. Bosnian Croat. Born in Bosnia and Herzegovina (then part of Yugoslavia)
73. Bosnian Serb. Born in Bosnia and Herzegovina (then part of Yugoslavia)
74. Capped for the Andalusia national football team
75. Capped for the Albania national football team
76. Capped for the Argentina national under-20 football team
77. Capped for the Austria national under-17 football team
78. Capped for the Basque Country national football team
79. Capped for the Belgium national under-17 football team
80. Capped for the Belgium national under-19 football team
81. Capped for the Belgium national under-20 football team
82. Capped for the Belgium national football team
83. Capped for the Bosnia and Herzegovina national under-21 football team
84. Capped for the Brazil national under-17 football team
85. Capped for the Brazil national under-20 football team
86. Capped for the Brazil national football team
87. Capped for the Brittany national football team
88. Capped for the Canada men's national under-20 soccer team
89. Capped for the Catalonia national football team
90. Capped for the Cayman Islands national football team
91. Capped for the Corsica national football team
92. Capped for the Croatia national football team
93. Capped for the Croatia national under-21 football team
94. Capped for the Croatia national under-19 football team
95. Capped for the Denmark national under-21 football team
96. Capped for the Dominican Republic national football team
97. Capped for the DR Congo national football team
98. Capped for the England national football B team
99. Capped for the England national football C team
100. Capped for the England national under-16 football team
101. Capped for the England national under-17 football team
102. Capped for the England national under-18 football team
103. Capped for the England national under-19 football team
104. Capped for the England national under-20 football team
105. Capped for the England national under-21 football team
106. Capped for the England national football team
107. Capped for the Spain national under-17 football team
108. Capped for the France national under-16 football team
109. Capped for the France national under-17 football team
110. Capped for the France national under-18 football team
111. Capped for the France national under-19 football team
112. Capped for the France national under-20 football team
113. Capped for the France national under-21 football team
114. Capped for the Galicia national football team
115. Capped for the Germany national under-15 football team
116. Capped for the Germany national under-18 football team
117. Capped for the Germany national under-20 football team
118. Capped for the Germany national under-21 football team
119. Capped for the Germany national football team
120. Capped for the Great Britain men's Olympic football team
121. Capped for the Guadeloupe national football team
122. Capped for the French Guiana national football team
123. Capped for the Republic of Ireland national under-19 football team
124. Capped for the Italy national under-21 football team
125. Capped for the Kosovo national under-21 football team
126. Capped for the Kosovo national under-19 football team
127. Capped for the Morocco national football team
128. Capped for the Martinique national football team
129. Capped for the Netherlands national football team
130. Capped for the Netherlands national under-19 football team
131. Capped for the Netherlands national under-21 football team
132. Capped for the Netherlands national under-20 football team
133. Capped for the Netherlands national under-17 football team
134. Capped for the Northern Ireland national football B team
135. Capped for the North Macedonia national under-17 football team (then Macedonia)
136. Capped for the Northern Ireland national under-21 football team
137. Capped for the Norway national under-21 football team
138. Capped for the Poland national under-18 football team
139. Capped for the Portugal national football team
140. Capped for the Portugal national under-17 football team
141. Capped for the Portugal national under-19 football team
142. Capped for the Portugal national under-20 football team
143. Capped for the Portugal national under-21 football team
144. Capped for the Portugal national under-21 football team
145. Capped for the Romania national under-17 football team
146. Capped for the Samoa national under-20 football team (then Western Samoa)
147. Capped for the Scotland national football B team
148. Capped for the Scotland national under-21 football team
149. Capped for the Scotland national under-19 football team
150. Capped for the Scotland national under-18 football team
151. Capped for the Scotland national under-16 football team
152. Capped for the Serbia national under-19 football team
153. Capped for the Spain national under-18 football team
154. Capped for the Spain national under-19 football team
155. Capped for the Spain national under-21 football team
156. Capped for the Sweden men's national football team
157. Capped for the Sweden men's national under-19 football team
158. Capped for the Sweden men's national under-17 football team
159. Capped for the Switzerland national under-16 football team
160. Capped for the Switzerland national under-17 football team
161. Capped for the Switzerland national under-18 football team
162. Capped for the Switzerland national under-21 football team
163. Capped for the Switzerland national football team
164. Capped for the Turkey national under-21 football team
165. Kosovo Albanian. Born in Kosovo (then part of Yugoslavia)
