= 2018–19 Greenock Morton F.C. season =

Greenock Morton
2017–18 season
- Chairman: Douglas Rae
- Manager: Ray McKinnon (until 30 August); Jonatan Johansson (from 6 September)
- Stadium: Cappielow Park
- Championship: Fifth place
- League Cup: Group stage
- Challenge Cup: First round
- Scottish Cup: Fourth round
- Top goalscorer: League: Robert McHugh & Greg Kiltie (6); All: Robert McHugh (10)
- Highest home attendance: 4,661 v St Mirren, Championship, 12 August 2017
- Lowest home attendance: 1,036 v Livingston, Challenge Cup, 15 August 2017
- Average home league attendance: 1,985
Home colours	Away colours

Season 2018–19 saw Greenock Morton compete in the Scottish Championship the second tier of Scottish football, having finished seventh in 2017–18. Morton also competed in the Challenge Cup, Scottish League Cup and the Scottish Cup.

== Fixtures and results ==
Win Draw Loss Upcoming fixture

=== Pre–Season ===
7 July 2018 Friendly	Forfar Athletic	0–0	Greenock Morton	Forfar
14:00		Report		Stadium: Station Park

=== Scottish Championship ===
4 August 2018 1	Greenock Morton	2–2	Queen of the South	Cappielow, Greenock
15:00	Tidser 47'; MacLean 63'	Report	Semple 69'; Todd 76'	Attendance: 2,019; Referee: Gavin Duncan

11 August 2018 2	Alloa Athletic	0–2	Greenock Morton	Recreation Park, Alloa
15:00		Report	Millar 15', 81'	Attendance: 836; Referee: Alan Newlands

25 August 2018 3	Greenock Morton	2–1	Ross County	Cappielow, Greenock
15:00	Tidser 60'; McHugh 77'	Report	Cowie 58'	Attendance: 1,994; Referee: Greg Aitken

1 September 2018 4	Partick Thistle	1–0	Greenock Morton	Firhill Stadium, Glasgow
15:00	Erskine 50'	Report		Attendance: 3,431; Referee: Barry Cook

15 September 2018 5	Dundee United	1–1	Greenock Morton	Tannadice Park, Dundee
15:00	Fyvie 90+3'	Report	Tidser 11'	Attendance: 4,594; Referee: Colin Steven

22 September 2018 6	Greenock Morton	1–1	Dunfermline Athletic	Cappielow, Greenock
15:00	Tiffoney 81'	Report	Ryan 68'	Attendance: 2,084; Referee: Euan Anderson

29 September 2018 7	Greenock Morton	1–5	Ayr United	Cappielow, Greenock
15:00	Telfer 35'	Report	Shankland 19', 75'; Moore 73', 81'; McDaid 89'	Attendance: 2,273; Referee: Steven McLean

6 October 2018 8	Inverness CT	1–1	Greenock Morton	Caledonian Stadium, Inverness
15:00	White 45'	Report	Telfer 10'	Attendance: 2,186; Referee: Craig Thomson

20 October 2018 9	Greenock Morton	1–0	Falkirk	Cappielow, Greenock
15:00	McHugh 76'	Report	Fasan (red card) 49'	Attendance: 2,757; Referee: John Beaton

27 October 2018 10	Ross County	5–0	Greenock Morton	Victoria Park, Dingwall
15:00	McKay 9', 42', 48'; Keillor-Dunn 57'; Graham 90+1' (pen.)	Report		Attendance: 3,481; Referee: Steven Reid

30 October 2018 11	Queen of the South	1–2	Greenock Morton	Palmerston Park, Dumfries
15:00	Dobbie 65'	Report	McHugh 76'; Lyon 84'	Attendance: 1,174; Referee: Alan Newlands

3 November 2018 12	Greenock Morton	5–1	Partick Thistle	Cappielow, Greenock
15:00	Oliver 23'; McHugh 43', 66'; Iredale 54'; Tidser 71'	Report	Ntambwe 16'	Attendance: 2,197; Referee: Steven McLean

10 November 2018 13	Greenock Morton	0–2	Alloa Athletic	Cappielow, Greenock
15:00		Report	Trouten 73'; Flannigan 85'	Attendance: 1,794; Referee: Colin Steven

17 November 2018 14	Ayr United	0–0	Greenock Morton	Somerset Park, Ayr
15:00	Moore (red card) 62'	Report		Attendance: 2,346; Referee: Willie Collum

1 December 2018 15	Dunfermline Athletic	3–0	Greenock Morton	East End Park, Dunfermline
15:00	Keena 3'; El Bakhtaoui 42' (pen.); Craigen 86'	Report		Attendance: 4,370; Referee: John Beaton

8 December 2018 16	Greenock Morton	1–1	Dundee United	Cappielow, Greenock
15:00	Buchanan 78'	Report	Frans 31'	Attendance: 1,916; Referee: David Munro

15 December 2018 17	Falkirk	0–0	Greenock Morton	Falkirk Stadium, Falkirk
15:00		Report		Attendance: 3,775; Referee: Gavin Ross

22 December 2018 18	Greenock Morton	1–2	Inverness CT	Cappielow, Greenock
15:00	Tiffoney 74'	Report	Walsh 17'; Doran 49'	Attendance: 1,608; Referee: Steven Reid

29 December 2018 19	Partick Thistle	1–2	Greenock Morton	Firhill Stadium, Glasgow
15:00	Slater 60'	Report	Tiffoney 9'; Telfer 80'	Attendance: 3,074; Referee: Euan Anderson

4 January 2019 20	Greenock Morton	1–0	Ross County	Cappielow, Greenock
19:45	Waddell 66'	Report	Fraser (red card) 90+2'	Attendance: 1,537; Referee: Willie Collum

12 January 2019 21	Alloa Athletic	1–2	Greenock Morton	Recreation Park, Alloa
15:00	Trouten 67' (pen.); Waddell 77' (o.g.)	Report	Millar 12'	Attendance: 931; Referee: David Lowe

26 January 2019 22	Greenock Morton	0–0	Dunfermline Athletic	Cappielow, Greenock
15:00		Report		Attendance: 1,907; Referee: Alan Newlands

2 February 2019 23	Dundee United	2–1	Greenock Morton	Tannadice Park, Dundee
15:00	Šafranko 8'; Pawlett 29'	Report	McHugh 73'	Attendance: 4,902; Referee: Gavin Ross

16 February 2019 24	Greenock Morton	0–0	Ayr United	Cappielow, Greenock
15:00		Report		Attendance: 2,335; Referee: Colin Steven

23 February 2019 26	Inverness CT	1–0	Greenock Morton	Caledonian Stadium, Inverness
15:00	Tremarco 11'	Report		Attendance: 2,413; Referee: Steven Reid

26 February 2019 25	Greenock Morton	1–0	Queen of the South	Cappielow, Greenock
19:45	Buchanan 85'	Report		Attendance: 1,324; Referee: David Lowe

1 March 2019 27	Greenock Morton	1–1	Falkirk	Cappielow, Greenock
19:05	Kiltie 32'	Report	Rudden 40'; Dixon (red card) 60'	Attendance: 1,838; Referee: Andrew Dallas

9 March 2019 28	Ross County	2–0	Greenock Morton	Victoria Park, Dingwall
15:00	Mullin 55'; Graham 78'	Report		Attendance: 3,110; Referee: Greg Aitken

30 March 2019 29	Greenock Morton	0–3	Partick Thistle	Cappielow, Greenock
15:00		Report	Doolan 17', 43'; Anderson 36'	Attendance: 2,329; Referee: John Beaton

2 April 2019 30	Ayr United	0–0	Greenock Morton	Somerset Park, Ayr
19:45	Shankland 21' (pen.)	Report	Kiltie 71'	Attendance: 1,802; Referee: Willie Collum

6 April 2019 31	Queen of the South	1–1	Greenock Morton	Palmerston Park, Dumfries
15:00	Jacobs 42'	Report	Telfer 64'	Attendance: 1,442; Referee: Don Robertson

9 April 2019 32	Greenock Morton	1–2	Alloa Athletic	Cappielow, Greenock
19:45	Kiltie 51' (pen.)	Report	Andy Graham 54'; Hamilton 80'	Attendance: 1,498; Referee: Steve Kirkland

16 April 2019 33	Greenock Morton	2–2	Inverness CT	Cappielow, Greenock
19:45	McDonald 18'; McCauley 88'	Report	Lyon 27'; Kiltie 42' (pen.)	Attendance: 1,315; Referee: David Lowe

20 April 2019 34	Falkirk	0–2	Greenock Morton	Falkirk Stadium, Falkirk
15:00		Report	Kiltie 47'; Telfer 54'	Attendance: 5,254; Referee: Colin Stewart

27 April 2019 35	Dunfermline Athletic	0–1	Greenock Morton	East End Park, Dunfermline
15:00	Longridge (red card) 73'	Report	Kiltie 84' (pen.)	Attendance: 4,883; Referee: David Munro

4 May 2019 36	Greenock Morton	1–0	Dundee United	Cappielow, Greenock
15:00	Tidser 19'	Report		Attendance: 2,244; Referee: Grant Irvine

=== Scottish League Cup ===
==== Group stage ====
Results

14 July 2018 Group stage	Ayr United	3–1	Greenock Morton	Somerset Park, Ayr
15:00	Shankland 48', 72', 75'	Report	Tidser 14'	Attendance: 1,586; Referee: Willie Collum

17 July 2018 Group stage	Partick Thistle	2–1	Greenock Morton	Firhill Stadium, Glasgow
15:00	Storer 17'; Penrice 29'	Report	Tumilty 74'	Attendance: 2,088; Referee: Kevin Clancy

21 July 2018 Group stage	Greenock Morton	2–0	Stenhousemuir	Cappielow, Greenock
15:00	MacLean 33'; McHugh 41'	Report		Attendance: 847; Referee: Colin Steven

28 July 2018 Group stage	Greenock Morton	5–0	Albion Rovers	Cappielow, Greenock
15:00	McHugh 36'; Bell 38'; Tidser 74' (pen.), 79'; Armour 75'	Report		Attendance: 758; Referee: Steven Reid

=== Scottish Challenge Cup ===
14 August 2018 First round	Dumbarton	2–1	Greenock Morton	Dumbarton Football Stadium, Dumbarton
19:45	Paton 12'; Russell 26'	Report	Oliver 39'	Attendance: 680; Referee: Gavin Ross

=== Scottish Cup ===
24 November 2018 Third round	Greenock Morton	1–1	Peterhead	Cappielow, Greenock
15:00	McHugh 40'	Report	Brown 26'	Attendance: 958; Referee: Mike Roncone

27 November 2018 Third round replay	Peterhead	0–3	Greenock Morton	Balmoor Stadium, Peterhead
20:00		Report	Waddell 10'; Thomson 61'; Millar 83'	Attendance: 527; Referee: Gavin Ross

19 January 2019 Fourth round	East Fife	2–1	Greenock Morton	Bayview Stadium, Methil
15:00	Dowds 9'; Watson 75'	Report	McHugh 7'	Attendance: 903; Referee: Steven Kirkland

== Player statistics ==
As of 4 May 2019 (UTC)

No.	Pos	Nat	Player	Total		Championship		League Cup		Scottish Cup		Other	
No.	Pos	Nat	Player	Apps	Goals	Apps	Goals	Apps	Goals	Apps	Goals	Apps	Goals
1	GK	(Scotland) SCO	Derek Gaston	15	0	10+0	0	1+0	0	3+0	0	1+0	0
2	DF	(Scotland) SCO	Lee Kilday	40	0	33+0	0	4+0	0	3+0	0	0+0	0
3	DF	(Scotland) SCO	Jack Iredale	36	1	23+5	1	3+1	0	3+0	0	1+0	0
4	DF	(Scotland) SCO	Gregor Buchanan	41	2	35+0	2	3+0	0	3+0	0	0+0	0
5	DF	(Scotland) SCO	Kerr Waddell	28	2	17+6	1	2+0	0	2+0	1	1+0	0
6	MF	(Scotland) SCO	Charlie Telfer	34	5	24+5	5	3+0	0	1+1	0	0+0	0
7	MF	(Scotland) SCO	Chris Millar	36	4	26+4	3	3+0	0	2+1	1	0+0	0
8	MF	(Scotland) SCO	Jim McAlister	40	0	33+0	0	4+0	0	2+1	0	0+0	0
9	FW	(Scotland) SCO	Denny Johnstone	4	0	3+1	0	0+0	0	0+0	0	0+0	0
10	FW	(Scotland) SCO	Robert Thomson	17	7	7+6	6	0+0	0	2+1	1	1+0	0
11	FW	(Scotland) SCO	Bob McHugh	36	10	22+7	6	3+1	2	3+0	2	0+0	0
12	MF	(Scotland) SCO	Michael Tidser	37	8	26+4	5	4+0	3	3+0	0	0+0	0
14	MF	(Scotland) SCO	Reghan Tumilty	40	1	31+3	0	3+0	1	3+0	0	0+0	0
15	MF	(Scotland) SCO	Dylan Dykes	9	0	4+3	0	0+0	0	1+0	0	1+0	0
17	MF	(England) ENG	Keelan O'Connell	6	0	2+4	0	0+0	0	0+0	0	0+0	0
18	FW	(Scotland) SCO	Gary Oliver	25	2	13+5	1	2+2	0	1+1	0	1+0	1
19	MF	(Scotland) SCO	Ross MacLean	21	2	9+7	1	4+0	1	0+0	0	0+1	0
20	MF	(Scotland) SCO	Greg Kiltie	14	6	13+1	6	0+0	0	0+0	0	0+0	0
21	MF	(Scotland) SCO	Ruaridh Langan	2	0	0+0	0	0+1	0	0+0	0	1+0	0
22	FW	(Scotland) SCO	Ben Armour	6	1	0+1	0	0+3	1	0+1	0	0+1	0
23	GK	(Scotland) SCO	Robby McCrorie	15	0	15+0	0	0+0	0	0+0	0	0+0	0
25	DF	(Northern Ireland) NIR	Rory McKeown	18	0	16+0	0	0+0	0	1+1	0	0+0	0
28	MF	(Scotland) SCO	Jack Purdue	2	0	0+0	0	0+1	0	0+1	0	0+0	0
32	MF	(Scotland) SCO	Reece Lyon	20	2	13+6	2	0+0	0	0+0	0	0+1	0
37	MF	(Scotland) SCO	Lewis McGrattan	2	0	0+2	0	0+0	0	0+0	0	0+0	0
38	MF	(Scotland) SCO	Ben Eardley	3	0	0+2	0	0+0	0	0+0	0	1+0	0
44	FW	(Scotland) SCO	Andrew Dallas	12	0	5+7	0	0+0	0	0+0	0	0+0	0
Players who left the club during the 2018–19 season
15	MF	(United States) USA	Kyle Thomson	1	0	0+0	0	0+0	0	0+0	0	1+0	0
17	FW	(Scotland) SCO	Scott Tiffoney	12	3	5+6	3	0+0	0	0+0	0	1+0	0
20	MF	(Scotland) SCO	Connor Bell	3	1	0+1	0	1+0	1	0+0	0	1+0	0
23	GK	(Republic of Ireland) IRL	Ryan Scully	15	0	11+1	0	3+0	0	0+0	0	0+0	0

== Team statistics ==
=== League table ===
Pos	Team	Pld	W	D	L	GF	GA	GD	Pts	Promotion, qualification or relegation
3	Inverness Caledonian Thistle	36	14	14	8	48	40	+8	56	Qualification for the Premiership play-off quarter-final
4	Ayr United	36	15	9	12	50	38	+12	54	Qualification for the Premiership play-off quarter-final
5	Greenock Morton	36	11	13	12	36	45	−9	46	
6	Partick Thistle	36	12	7	17	43	52	−9	43	
7	Dunfermline Athletic	36	11	8	17	33	40	−7	41	

Source: SPFL
Rules for classification: 1) Points; 2) Goal difference; 3) Goals scored; 4) Points in head-to-head matches; 5) Goal difference in hth matches; 6). Goals scored in hth matches; 7). Play-off (only for deciding promotion, play-off participation and relegation).

=== Division summary ===
Round	1	2	3	4	5	6	7	8	9	10	11	12	13	14	15	16	17	18	19	20	21	22	23	24	25	26	27	28	29	30	31	32	33	34	35	36
Ground	H	A	H	A	A	H	H	A	H	A	A	H	H	A	A	H	A	H	A	H	A	H	A	H	A	H	H	A	H	A	A	H	H	A	A	H
Result	D	W	W	L	D	D	L	D	W	L	W	W	L	D	L	D	D	L	W	W	L	D	L	D	L	W	D	L	L	D	D	L	D	W	W	W
Position	5	2	2	5	6	5	6	7	6	6	6	4	5	5	6	6	6	6	5	4	6	6	6	6	7	6	6	6	6	6	6	7	6	6	5	5

Updated to match(es) played on 4 May 2019. Source:
A = Away; H = Home; W = Win; D = Draw; L = Loss

=== League cup table ===
Pos	Team	Pld	W	PW	PL	L	GF	GA	GD	Pts	Qualification	AYR	PAR	GMO	STE	ALB
1	Ayr United (Q)	4	4	0	0	0	12	1	+11	12	Qualification for the Second round	—	—	3–1	5–0	—
2	Partick Thistle (Q)	4	3	0	0	1	6	3	+3	9	Qualification for the Second round	0–2	—	2–1	—	—
3	Greenock Morton	4	2	0	0	2	9	5	+4	6		—	—	—	2–0	5–0
4	Stenhousemuir	4	1	0	0	3	4	9	−5	3		—	0–2	—	—	4–0
5	Albion Rovers	4	0	0	0	4	0	13	−13	0		0–2	0–2	—	—	—

Rules for classification: 1) goal difference, 2) goals scored, 3) away goals scored, 4) matches won, 5) away matches won, 6) drawing of lots.
(Q) Qualified to the phase indicated
