= Jesse Curran =

Filipino footballer (born 1996)

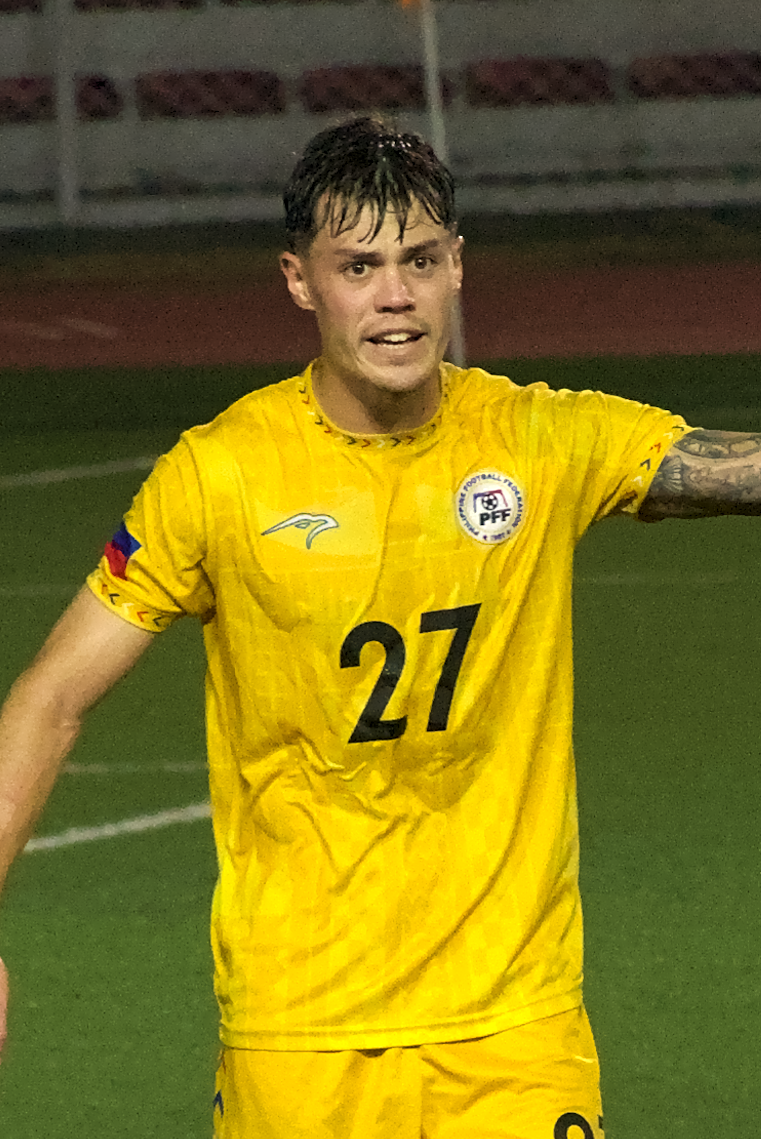
- Curran playing for Philippines in 2023

Personal information
- Full name: Jesse Thomas Garcia Curran
- Date of birth: 16 July 1996 (age 30)
- Place of birth: Burnie, Australia
- Height: 1.82 m (6 ft 0 in)
- Positions: Right back; right winger; midfielder

Team information
- Current team: Ratchaburi
- Number: 27

Youth career
- 2012: Devonport City
- 2013: Blacktown City
- 2013–2015: Central Coast Mariners
- 2015–2017: Dundee

Senior career*
Years	Team	Apps	(Gls)
2012	Devonport City	8	(1)
2013	Blacktown City	2	(0)
2013	Central Coast Mariners	0	(0)
2014	CCM Academy	20	(1)
2015–2019	Dundee	46	(1)
2015	→ Montrose (loan)	3	(0)
2017	→ East Fife (loan)	12	(0)
2020–2021	Muangthong United	13	(0)
2020	→ Udon Thani (loan)	16	(3)
2020	→ Nakhon Ratchasima (loan)	14	(0)
2022	Kaya–Iloilo	0	(0)
2022–2023	BG Pathum United	6	(1)
2023	→ Chonburi (loan)	10	(2)
2023–	Ratchaburi	84	(4)

International career^{‡}
2022–	Philippines	14	(0)
- * Club domestic league appearances and goals as of 7 June 2026 ‡ National team caps and goals as of 25 March 2025

Jesse Thomas Garcia Curran (born 16 July 1996) is a professional footballer who plays for Thai League 1 club Ratchaburi. Born in Australia, he represents the Philippines at international level. Curran is a versatile player who can play as a midfielder and also down the right flank either as a right winger or a right-back.

He has previously played for Devonport City, Blacktown City, Central Coast Mariners, Dundee and on loan for Montrose and East Fife. After Dundee, Curran left Scotland to play in Thailand for Muangthong United, and on loan with Udon Thani and Nakhon Ratchasima. He returned to Thailand in 2022, playing for BG Pathum United and subsequently on loan with Chonburi.

== Early life ==
Curran was raised in Tasmania before moving to Sydney to attend Westfields Sports High School, aged sixteen. He is of Scottish heritage on his father's side and is of Filipino heritage on his mother's side.

== Club career ==
=== Central Coast Mariners ===
Curran signed with Central Coast Mariners to play in the National Youth League in September 2013. He was an unused substitute for the senior side on one occasion, an A-League match against Adelaide United in October 2013. He received the club's National Youth League Player of the Year award in 2014.

=== Dundee ===
In March 2015, Curran trialled with Scottish Premiership club Dundee. He signed a two-year deal with the club shortly after. He made his senior debut for the club on 4 October 2015, coming on as a first-half substitute for captain Kevin Thomson in a win over Motherwell.

==== Loan to Montrose ====
In November 2015, Curran joined Montrose on a one-month emergency loan deal, playing in three matches before returning to Dundee.

==== Loan to East Fife ====
In March 2017, he joined Scottish League One side East Fife on an emergency loan deal. He signed a new contract with Dundee after returning to the club in May 2017.

Curran signed a new one-year deal with Dundee in June 2018. In the 2018–19 season, he began to feature regularly in Dundee's starting eleven. He scored his first goal for the side in a 4–0 win over Hamilton Academical in December 2018.

He left Dundee in June 2019, his contract having expired.

=== Muangthong United ===
After a successful trial, Curran signed a deal with Thai side Muangthong United at the beginning of 2020.

==== Loan to Udon Thani ====
When Muangthong were unable to register him as an ASEAN player, he went on loan to Thai League 2 side Udon Thani on 7 February 2020. He scored his first goal for the club on 21 February against Navy FC. Curran was named in the Team of the Week after the following match against Sisaket, but he was sent off the next week against Phrae United. Upon the return of football in Thailand after the disruption caused by the COVID-19 pandemic, he scored in his next appearance against Customs United.

==== Loan to Nakhon Ratchasima ====
In December 2020, Curran left Udon Thani and joined Thai League 1 side Nakhon Ratchasima on loan from Muangthong. He made his debut for Korat the following week.

Curran was released from Muangthong at the end of 2021.

=== Kaya–Iloilo ===
On 20 February 2022, Curran joined Philippines Football League side Kaya–Iloilo. Curran would make his debut for them on 8 March in an AFC Champions League game against Australian side Sydney FC.

=== BG Pathum United ===
Curran would return to Thai football after signing with Thai League 1 side BG Pathum United. He would make his debut for the Rabbits in the 2022 Thailand Champions Cup, where Pathum would beat Buriram United to win the silverware. Curran would score his first goal for Pathum in a league win over former club Muangthong United.

==== Loan to Chonburi ====
On 5 December 2022, Curran joined fellow Thai League 1 side Chonburi on loan until the end of the season. Curran would score two goals in his debut for Chonburi on 22 January 2023 in a 5–3 league win over Police Tero.

=== Ratchaburi ===
On 16 July 2023, Curran joined Thai League 1 club Ratchaburi. Curran scored his first goal for the Dragons on 17 August 2024 in a league draw against Uthai Thani.

== International career ==
Curran is eligible to play for the national teams of Australia, Scotland and Philippines.

In September 2018, Australia coach Graham Arnold (who had coached Curran at Central Coast Mariners) watched Curran play for Dundee, as a potential selection for the 2019 AFC Asian Cup.

=== Philippines ===
Two months later, he was contacted by Philippines coach Sven-Goran Eriksson in relation to representing the team internationally. He made an unofficial appearance for the Azkals, coming in as a substitute during the Azkals' friendly 3-1 win over Chainat Hornbill.

Curran was included in the 25-man squad of the Philippines for 2022 FAS Tri-Nations Series. He debuted in a 2–0 loss to Singapore on 29 March 2022.

== Career statistics ==
As of match played on 10 May 2026

Appearances and goals by club, season and competition
Club	Season	League			Cup		League Cup		Other		Total	
Club	Season	Division	Apps	Goals	Apps	Goals	Apps	Goals	Apps	Goals	Apps	Goals
Central Coast Mariners	2013–14	A-League	0	0	—		—		—		0	0
Dundee	2015–16	Scottish Premiership	3	0	0	0	0	0	—		3	0
Dundee	2016–17	Scottish Premiership	1	0	0	0	1	0	—		2	0
Dundee	2017–18	Scottish Premiership	8	0	0	0	0	0	—		8	0
Dundee	2018–19	Scottish Premiership	34	1	1	1	5	0	—		40	2
Dundee	Total		46	1	1	1	6	0	0	0	53	2
Montrose (loan)	2015–16	Scottish League Two	3	0	0	0	0	0	0	0	3	0
East Fife (loan)	2016–17	Scottish League One	12	0	0	0	0	0	0	0	12	0
Muangthong United	2020–21	Thai League 1	0	0	0	0	0	0	—		0	0
Muangthong United	2021–22	Thai League 1	13	0	2	0	0	0	—		15	0
Muangthong United	Total		13	0	2	0	0	0	0	0	15	0
Udon Thani (loan)	2020–21	Thai League 2	16	3	1	0	0	0	—		17	3
Nakhon Ratchasima (loan)	2020–21	Thai League 1	14	0	0	0	0	0	—		14	0
Kaya–Iloilo	2022	Philippines Football League	0	0	5	0	—		3 (Note: Appearances in the AFC Champions League and AFC Cup)	0	8	0
BG Pathum United	2022–23	Thai League 1	6	1	1	0	0	0	1 (Note: Appearance in the Thailand Champions Cup)	0	8	1
Chonburi (loan)	2022–23	Thai League 1	10	2	—		—		—		10	2
Ratchaburi	2023–24	Thai League 1	28	0	0	0	2	0	0	0	30	0
Ratchaburi	2024–25	Thai League 1	28	3	2	0	3	0	0	0	33	3
Ratchaburi	2025–26	Thai League 1	28	1	2	0	0	0	10	0	40	1
Ratchaburi	Total		84	4	4	0	5	0	10	0	105	4
Career total			204	11	14	1	11	0	14	0	245	12

== Honours ==
=== Club ===
BG Pathum United

- Thailand Champions Cup: 2022

== See also ==
- List of foreign Scottish Premiership players
