= Matthew Henvey =

Scottish footballer

Personal information
- Date of birth: 4 January 2000 (age 26)
- Place of birth: Perth, Scotland
- Position: Forward

Senior career*
Years	Team	Apps	(Gls)
2017–2019	Dundee	5	(1)
2019	→ Cowdenbeath (loan)	7	(1)
2019	Kelty Hearts	0	(0)
2020	Gold Coast Knights	5	(1)
- * Club domestic league appearances and goals as of 04:55, 8 May 2020 (UTC) ‡ National team caps and goals as of 27 December 2017

Matthew Henvey (born 4 January 2000) is a Scottish professional footballer who plays as a forward.

== Professional career ==
Henvey made his professional debut for Dundee in a 2–0 Scottish Premiership loss to Celtic on 26 December 2017, coming on as a late substitute.

Henvey was loaned to Cowdenbeath in January 2019.

At the end of the 2018–19 season, Henvey was released by Dundee.

== Career statistics ==
As of match played 18 June 2019

Appearances and goals by club, season and competition
Club	Season	League			Scottish Cup		League Cup		Other		Total	
Club	Season	Division	Apps	Goals	Apps	Goals	Apps	Goals	Apps	Goals	Apps	Goals
Dundee	2016–17	Scottish Premiership	0	0	0	0	0	0	1 (Note: Appearances for Dundee under-20s in the Scottish Challenge Cup in which age-resteicted sides from the Scottish Premiership compete against senior clubs)	0	1	0
Dundee	2017–18	Scottish Premiership	4	1	0	0	0	0	1	2	5	3
Dundee	2018–19	Scottish Premiership	1	0	0	0	2	0	2	0	5	0
Dundee	Total		5	1	0	0	2	0	4	2	11	3
Cowdenbeath (loan)	2018–19	Scottish League Two	7	1	1	0	0	0	0	0	8	1
Career total			12	2	1	0	2	0	4	2	19	4
