= Kerr Waddell =

Scottish footballer

Personal information
- Date of birth: 14 June 1998 (age 28)
- Place of birth: Dundee, Scotland
- Position: Defender

Team information
- Current team: Dundee North End

Youth career
- –2017: Dundee

Senior career*
Years	Team	Apps	(Gls)
2017–2019	Dundee	16	(3)
2017	→ Clyde (loan)	6	(0)
2018–2019	→ Greenock Morton (loan)	23	(1)
2019–2026	Montrose	95	(6)
2026–	Dundee North End		
- * Club domestic league appearances and goals as of 24 August 2026

Kerr Waddell (born 14 June 1998) is a Scottish professional footballer who plays as a defender Midlands Premier League club Dundee North End. He has previously played for Dundee and Montrose, as well as loan spells for Clyde and Greenock Morton.

== Club career ==
Waddell is a product of Dundee's youth academy. Having featured regularly for Dundee's U20 side, including playing in a Challenge Cup tie against Cove Rangers, Waddell was named among the substitutes for a handful of senior league games during the 2016–17 season, without making an appearance.

On 30 March 2017, Waddell, along with Dundee teammate Kyle Gourlay, signed on loan for Scottish League Two club Clyde until the end of the season.

Waddell made his competitive debut for Dundee on 18 July 2017, against Raith Rovers in the Scottish League Cup, replacing Darren O'Dea after 82 minutes. He went on to start Dundee's next three League Cup group stage matches, as the club progressed to the knockout rounds as runners-up to rivals Dundee United. Waddell scored his first goals in his senior career in a 2–1 win against Hearts.

Waddell moved on loan to Scottish Championship club Greenock Morton in July 2018. On 14 November his loan spell was extended until the end of the season. Waddell scored his first goal for the club with the opener as Morton defeated Peterhead in the Scottish Cup.

On 30 June 2019, Waddell left Dundee following the expiry of his contract.

In July 2019 Waddell signed a two-year contract with Scottish League One side Montrose.

On 9 May 2025, Waddell signed a 12-month contract extension with Montrose, taking his contract up until the summer of 2026 with an option of a further year. On 21 April 2026, Montrose confirmed that Waddel would leave the club at the end of the season.

On 13 June 2026, Waddell signed for Midlands Premier League club Dundee North End.

== Career statistics ==
As of 2 May 2026

Club	Season	League			Cup		League Cup		Other		Total	
Club	Season	Division	Apps	Goals	Apps	Goals	Apps	Goals	Apps	Goals	Apps	Goals
Dundee	2016–17	Scottish Premiership	0	0	0	0	0	0	1 (Note: Appearance for Dundee under-20s in the Scottish Challenge Cup, in which age-restricted teams from the Scottish Premiership clubs compete against senior clubs.)	0	1	0
Dundee	2017–18	Scottish Premiership	16	3	1	0	5	0	0	0	22	3
Dundee	2018–19	Scottish Premiership	0	0	0	0	0	0	0	0	0	0
Dundee	Total		16	3	1	0	5	0	1	0	23	3
Clyde (loan)	2016–17	Scottish League Two	6	0	0	0	0	0	0	0	6	0
Greenock Morton (loan)	2018–19	Scottish Championship	23	1	2	1	2	0	1 (Note: Appearance in the Scottish Challenge Cup)	0	28	2
Montrose	2019–20	Scottish League One	7	0	1	0	2	0	1	0	11	0
Montrose	2020–21	Scottish League One	11	0	1	0	3	0	2 (Note: Appearances in the Championship play-offs)	0	17	0
Montrose	2021–22	Scottish League One	12	0	2	0	4	0	1	0	19	0
Montrose	2022–23	Scottish League One	25	3	0	0	3	0	2	0	30	3
Montrose	2023–24	Scottish League One	9	2	0	0	0	0	1	0	10	2
Montrose	2024–25	Scottish League One	11	0	2	0	0	0	0	0	13	0
Montrose	2025–26	Scottish League One	20	1	0	0	2	1	1	1	23	3
Montrose	Total		95	6	6	0	14	1	8	1	123	8
Career total			140	10	9	1	21	1	10	1	180	13
