= 2017–18 Dundee F.C. season =

Dundee
2017–18 season
- Chairman: Tim Keyes
- Manager: Neil McCann
- Stadium: Dens Park, Dundee (Capacity: 11,506)
- Scottish Premiership: 9th
- League Cup: Quarter-final, lost to Celtic
- Scottish Cup: Fifth Round, lost to Motherwell
- Top goalscorer: League: Sofien Moussa (7); All: Sofien Moussa (12)
- Highest home attendance: 10,472 v Dundee United; League Cup Second round 9 August 2017
- Lowest home attendance: 2,774 v Buckie Thistle; League Cup Group C 22 July 2017
- Average home league attendance: 5,947
Home colours	Away colours	Third colours

The 2017–18 season was Dundee's fourth consecutive season in the top flight of Scottish football since their promotion at the end of the 2013–14 season. Dundee were knocked out of the League Cup in a 4–0 defeat by Celtic and were knocked out of Fifth round of the Scottish Cup by Motherwell.

== Competitions ==
=== Premiership ===
==== Results ====
5 August 2017	Dundee	1 – 2	Ross County	Dens Park, Dundee
15:00	Hendry 86'	BBC Report	Lindsay 35' 35'; Routis 61'	Attendance: 5,032; Referee: Willy Collum

12 August 2017	Hamilton	3 – 0	Dundee	New Douglas Park, Hamilton
15:00	MacKinnon 24'; Boyd 36'; Imrie 85' (pen.)	BBC Report		Attendance: 1,694; Referee: Bobby Madden

19 August 2017	Aberdeen	2 – 1	Dundee	Pittodrie Stadium, Aberdeen
15:00	May 11', 79'	BBC Report	Deacon 53'	Attendance: 15,646; Referee: Kevin Clancy

27 August 2017	Dundee	1 – 1	Hibernian	Dens Park, Dundee
12:30	Holt 9' (pen.)	BBC Report	Stokes 39'	Attendance: 6,004; Referee: Don Robertson

9 September 2017	Rangers	4 – 1	Dundee	Ibrox Stadium, Glasgow
15:00	Morelos 41', 85'; Windass 68'; Peña 83'	BBC Report	El Bakhtaoui 90+1'	Attendance: 49,164; Referee: Andrew Dallas

16 September 2017	Dundee	3 – 2	St Johnstone	Dens Park, Dundee
15:00	Leitch-Smith 9', 65'; Moussa 78' (pen.)	BBC Report	Craig 75' (pen.), 84' (pen.)	Attendance: 6,001; Referee: Alan Muir

23 September 2017	Kilmarnock	1 – 1	Dundee	Rugby Park, Kilmarnock
15:00	Greer 64'	BBC Report	El Bakhtaoui 4'	Attendance: 3,452; Referee: Bobby Madden

30 September 2017	Dundee	2 – 1	Hearts	Dens Park, Dundee
15:00	Waddell 44', 90+3'	BBC Report	Lafferty 71'	Attendance: 7,028; Referee: Steven McLean

14 October 2017	Celtic	1 – 0	Dundee	Celtic Park, Glasgow
15:00	Ntcham 61'	BBC Report		Attendance: 57,610; Referee: Andrew Dallas

21 October 2017	Partick Thistle	2 – 1	Dundee	Firhill Stadium, Glasgow
15:00	Edwards 75'; Storey 90+2'	BBC Report	Leitch-Smith 8'	Attendance: 3,358; Referee: Euan Anderson

25 October 2017	Dundee	0 – 1	Motherwell	Dens Park, Dundee
17:45		BBC Report	Tanner 5'	Attendance: 5,254; Referee: Stephen Finnie

28 October 2017	Dundee	1 – 3	Hamilton Academical	Dens Park, Dundee
15:00	Leitch-Smith	BBC Report	Skondras 39'; Templeton 64'; Rojano 86'	Attendance: 4,863; Referee: Greg Aitken

4 November 2017	Hibernian	2 – 1	Dundee	Easter Road, Edinburgh
15:00	Boyle 1'; Murray 63'	BBC Report	Haber 21'	Attendance: 16,936; Referee: John Beaton

18 November 2017	Dundee	0 – 0	Kilmarnock	Dens Park, Dundee
15:00		BBC Report		Attendance: 5,853; Referee: Willie Collum

24 November 2017	Dundee	2 – 1	Rangers	Dens Park, Dundee
19:45	O'Hara 66', 80'	BBC Report	Windass 70'	Attendance: 8,548; Referee: Kevin Clancy

2 December 2017	Ross County	0 – 2	Dundee	Victoria Park, Dingwall
15:00		BBC Report	O'Hara 18'; El Bakhtaoui 89'	Attendance: 3,896; Referee: Steven McLean

8 December 2017	Dundee	0 – 1	Aberdeen	Dens Park, Dundee
19:45		BBC Report	McKenna 48'	Attendance: 6,451; Referee: Nick Walsh

12 December 2017	Heart of Midlothian	2 – 0	Dundee	Tynecastle Stadium, Edinburgh
19:45	Gonçalves 30'; Berra 77'	BBC Report		Attendance: 15,566; Referee: Craig Thomson

16 December 2017	Dundee	3 – 0	Partick Thistle	Dens Park, Dundee
15:00	Moussa 19' (pen.), 65' (pen.); O'Hara 35'	BBC Report		Attendance: 5,101; Referee: Greg Aitken

23 December 2017	Motherwell	1 – 1	Dundee	Fir Park, Motherwell
15:00	Tanner 61' (pen.)	BBC Report	McGowan 47'	Attendance: 4,173; Referee: Don Robertson

26 December 2017	Dundee	0 – 2	Celtic	Dens Park, Dundee
19:45		BBC Report	Forrest 8'; Griffiths 43'	Attendance: 9,193; Referee: Kevin Clancy

30 December 2017	St Johnstone	0 – 2	Dundee	McDiarmid Park, Perth
15:00		Report	Haber 3'; Leitch-Smith 90+1'	Attendance: 4,769; Referee: William Collum

24 January 2018	Dundee	0 – 1	Hibernian	Dens Park, Dundee
19:45		Report	McGinn 52'	Attendance: 5,323; Referee: Don Robertson

27 January 2018	Hamilton Academical	1 – 2	Dundee	New Douglas Park, Hamilton
15:00	O'Hara 2' (o.g.); Templeton (red card) 74'	Report	Henvey 77'; Leitch-Smith 90+8'	Attendance: 1,776; Referee: Kevin Clancy

3 February 2018	Dundee	1 – 4	Ross County	Dens Park, Dundee
15:00	Waddell 57'	Report	Keillor-Dunn 49'; Schalk 61' (goal), 64'; Chow 90'	Attendance: 4,971; Referee: John Beaton

13 February 2018	Kilmarnock	3 – 2	Dundee	Rugby Park, Kilmarnock
19:45	Brophy 5'; Dicker (red card) 59'; Boyd 74'; Wilson 87'	Report	Moussa 31' (pen.); Caulker 56'	Attendance: 3,768; Referee: Nick Walsh

17 February 2018	Partick Thistle	1 – 2	Dundee	Firhill Stadium, Glasgow
15:00	Sammon 42'	Report	Murray 84' (goal), 90'	Attendance: 4,267; Referee: William Collum

24 February 2018	Dundee	0 – 1	Motherwell	Dens Park, Dundee
15:00		Report	Tanner 33'	Attendance: 5,003; Referee: Alan Muir

10 March 2018	Dundee	0 – 4	St Johnstone	Dens Park, Dundee
15:00		Report	Piggott 24' (o.g.); Kane 37' (goal), 66' Alston 64'	Attendance: 5,336; Referee: Craig Thomson

17 March 2018	Aberdeen	1 – 0	Dundee	Pittodrie Stadium, Aberdeen
15:00	Shinnie 35'	Report		Attendance: 15,028; Referee: William Collum

1 April 2018	Dundee	1 – 1	Heart of Midlothian	Dens Park, Dundee
15:00	Moussa 28'	Report	Callachan 2'	Attendance: 5,496; Referee: Kevin Clancy

4 April 2018	Celtic	0 – 0	Dundee	Celtic Park, Glasgow
19:45		Report		Attendance: 55,768; Referee: Alan Muir

7 April 2018	Rangers	4 – 0	Dundee	Ibrox Stadium, Glasgow
15:00	Miller 39'; Morelos 68'; Murphy 79'; Candeias 90'	Report		Attendance: 49,142; Referee: Greg Aitken

21 April 2018	Dundee	2 – 1	St Johnstone	Dens Park, Dundee
15:00	Moussa 1' (goal), 88'	Report	MacLean 85'	Attendance: 5,592; Referee: Don Robertson

28 April 2018	Motherwell	2 – 1	Dundee	Fir Park, Motherwell
15:00	Bowman 28'; Kipré 52'	Report	Kusunga 23'	Attendance: 4,064; Referee: Nick Walsh

5 May 2018	Dundee	1 – 0	Hamilton Academical	Dens Park, Dundee
15:00	Holt 18'	Report		Attendance: 5,195; Referee: Steven McLean

8 May 2018	Ross County	0 – 1	Dundee	Victoria Park, Dingwall
19:45		Report	Murray 51'	Attendance: 3,976; Referee: Andrew Dallas

12 May 2018	Dundee	0 – 1	Partick Thistle	Dens Park, Dundee
15:00		Report	Doolan 63'	Attendance: 6,756; Referee: Steven McLean

=== Scottish Cup ===
20 January 2018 Fourth Round	Dundee	2 – 2	Inverness Caledonian Thistle	Dens Park, Dundee
15:00	Leith-Smith 47' O'Hara 64'	Report	Doran 16' Oakley 87'	Attendance: 3,509; Referee: Stephen Finnie

30 January 2018 Fourth Round Replay	Inverness Caledonian Thistle	0 – 1	Dundee	Caledonian Stadium, Inverness
19:45		Report	Allan 47'	Attendance: 1,746; Referee: Stephen Finnie

10 February 2018 Fifth Round	Dundee	0 – 2	Motherwell	Dens Park, Dundee
		Report	Tanner 30'; Holt 56' (o.g.)	Attendance: 4,663; Referee: Bobby Madden

=== League Cup ===
==== Results ====
18 July 2017 Group Stage	Raith Rovers	1 – 2	Dundee	Stark's Park, Kirkcaldy
	Vaughan 90'	BBC Report	Moussa 83'; Hendry 90+2'	Attendance: 2,962; Referee: Stephen Finnie

22 July 2017 Group Stage	Dundee	2 – 0	Buckie Thistle	Dens Park, Dundee
	El Bakhtaoui 22'; Moussa 84'	BBC Report		Attendance: 2,774; Referee: Craig Charleston

26 July 2017 Group Stage	Cowdenbeath	0 – 3	Dundee	Central Park, Cowdenbeath
		BBC Report	Moussa 17', 23', 38'	Attendance: 1,321; Referee: Euan Anderson

30 July 2017 Group Stage	Dundee	1 – 1 (3 – 4 p)	Dundee United	Dens Park, Dundee
	O'Hara 60'	BBC Report	McMullan 45'	Attendance: 10,460; Referee: Kevin Clancy
	Penalties
	El Bakhtaoui (penalty missed); Wolters (penalty scored); Moussa (penalty scored); O'Dea (penalty scored); Deacon (penalty missed)		(penalty scored) McMullan; (penalty scored) King; (penalty scored) Toshney; (penalty missed) Chalmers; (penalty scored) McDonald

9 August 2017 Second Round	Dundee	2 – 1	Dundee United	Dens Park, Dundee
	El Bakhtaoui 30'; McGowan 64'	BBC Report	King 40'	Attendance: 10,472; Referee: Steven McLean

20 September 2017 Quarter-Finals	Dundee	0 – 4	Celtic	Dens Park, Dundee
		BBC Sport; Celtic Report	Sinclair 25' (pen.); Forrest 42', 90+1'; McGregor 88'	Attendance: 6,917; Referee: John Beaton

== Team statistics ==
=== Appearances ===
As of match played 12 May 2018

No.	Pos	Nat	Player	Total		Scottish Premiership		Scottish Cup		Scottish League Cup	
No.	Pos	Nat	Player	Apps	Goals	Apps	Goals	Apps	Goals	Apps	Goals
2	DF	(Scotland) SCO	Cammy Kerr	41	0	27+5	0	3	0	6	0
3	DF	(Scotland) SCO	Kevin Holt	32	2	22+2	2	2	0	6	0
4	DF	(England) ENG	Steven Caulker	12	1	12	1	0	0	0	0
5	DF	(Angola) ANG	Genseric Kusunga	10	1	7+2	1	1	0	0	0
6	DF	(Republic of Ireland) IRL	Darren O'Dea	22	0	14+2	0	2	0	4	0
7	MF	(England) ENG	A-Jay Leitch-Smith	31	7	13+14	6	3	1	1	0
8	MF	(Finland) FIN	Glen Kamara	46	0	37	0	3	0	5+1	0
9	FW	(Tunisia) TUN	Sofien Moussa	33	12	21+5	7	3	0	3+1	5
10	MF	(Scotland) SCO	Scott Allan	22	1	7+8	0	2	1	4+1	0
12	GK	(England) ENG	Elliot Parish	28	0	25	0	3	0	0	0
14	MF	(Scotland) SCO	Mark O'Hara	39	6	26+6	4	3	1	4	1
15	DF	(Spain) ESP	Jon Aurtenetxe	18	0	14+2	0	2	0	0	0
16	DF	(Spain) ESP	Julen Etxabeguren	1	0	0+1	0	0	0	0	0
17	FW	(Scotland) SCO	Simon Murray	14	3	13+1	3	0	0	0	0
18	MF	(Scotland) SCO	Paul McGowan	42	2	30+4	1	2	0	4+2	1
20	FW	(France) FRA	Faissal El Bakhtaoui	35	5	16+12	3	1+1	0	4+1	2
21	MF	(England) ENG	Roarie Deacon	36	1	25+3	1	0+2	0	5+1	0
23	MF	(Netherlands) NED	Randy Wolters	16	0	3+6	0	0+1	0	4+2	0
24	MF	(England) ENG	Josh Meekings	22	0	20+1	0	1	0	0	0
25	DF	(Wales) WAL	Daniel Jefferies	2	0	1+1	0	0	0	0	0
27	MF	(Australia) AUS	Jesse Curran	9	0	5+4	0	0	0	0	0
28	MF	(Scotland) SCO	Lewis Spence	20	0	14+3	0	0+1	0	2	0
29	FW	(Canada) CAN	Marcus Haber	13	2	9+2	2	0	0	1+1	0
33	FW	(Scotland) SCO	Craig Wighton	7	0	5+2	0	0	0	0	0
34	DF	(Scotland) SCO	Kerr Waddell	22	3	10+6	3	1	0	4+1	0
35	MF	(England) ENG	Cedwyn Scott	3	0	0+3	0	0	0	0	0
38	GK	(England) ENG	Calum Ferrie	2	0	1+1	0	0	0	0	0
40	DF	(England) ENG	Jordan Piggott	1	0	0+1	0	0	0	0	0
45	MF	(Scotland) SCO	Callum Moore	0	0	0	0	0	0	0	0
46	FW	(Scotland) SCO	Matthew Henvey	4	1	0+4	1	0	0	0	0
47	MF	(England) ENG	Jack Lambert	2	0	0+1	0	0+1	0	0	0
67	GK	(France) FRA	Jérémy Malherbe	0	0	0	0	0	0	0	0
Players who left the club during the season:
1	GK	(Scotland) SCO	Scott Bain	18	0	12	0	0	0	6	0
4	MF	(England) ENG	James Vincent	5	0	1+2	0	0	0	1+1	0
5	DF	(Northern Ireland) NIR	James McPake	0	0	0	0	0	0	0	0
11	MF	(England) ENG	Danny Williams	3	0	0+2	0	0	0	0+1	0
22	DF	(Scotland) SCO	Jack Hendry	30	2	23+1	1	1	0	4+1	1
26	DF	(Bulgaria) BUL	Kostadin Gadzhalov	0	0	0	0	0	0	0	0

=== Goal scorers ===
As of match played 12 May 2018

Ranking	Position	Nation	Number	Name	Scottish Premiership	Scottish Cup	Scottish League Cup	Total
1	FW	(Tunisia)	9	Sofien Moussa	7	0	5	12
2	FW	(England)	7	A-Jay Leitch-Smith	6	1	0	7
3	MF	(Scotland)	14	Mark O'Hara	4	1	1	6
4	FW	(France)	20	Faissal El Bakhtaoui	3	0	2	5
5	FW	(Scotland)	17	Simon Murray	3	0	0	3
5	DF	(Scotland)	34	Kerr Waddell	3	0	0	3
7	DF	(Scotland)	3	Kevin Holt	2	0	0	2
7	MF	(Scotland)	18	Paul McGowan	1	0	1	2
7	DF	(Scotland)	22	Jack Hendry	1	0	1	2
7	FW	(Canada)	29	Marcus Haber	2	0	0	2
11	DF	(England)	4	Steven Caulker	1	0	0	1
11	DF	(Angola)	5	Genseric Kusunga	1	0	0	1
11	MF	(England)	10	Scott Allan	0	1	0	1
11	MF	(England)	21	Roarie Deacon	1	0	0	1
11	FW	(Scotland)	46	Matthew Henvey	1	0	0	1
TOTALS					36	3	10	49

== Squad statistics ==
=== League table ===
Pos	Team	Pld	W	D	L	GF	GA	GD	Pts	Qualification or relegation (Note: Teams play each other three times (33 matches) before the league is split into two groups (the top six and the bottom six).)
7	Motherwell	38	13	9	16	43	49	−6	48	
8	St Johnstone	38	12	10	16	42	53	−11	46	
9	Dundee	38	11	6	21	36	57	−21	39	
10	Hamilton Academical	38	9	6	23	47	68	−21	33	
11	Partick Thistle (R)	38	8	9	21	31	61	−30	33	Qualification for the Premiership play-off final

Source: Soccerway BBC
Rules for classification: 1) Points; 2) Goal difference; 3) Goals scored; 4) Play-off (only if deciding champion, UEFA competitions qualification and second-stage group allocation).
(R) Relegated

=== Group C Table ===
Pos	Team	Pld	W	PW	PL	L	GF	GA	GD	Pts	Qualification	DUN	DND	RAI	COW	BUC
1	Dundee United (Q)	4	3	1	0	0	10	2	+8	11	Qualification for the Second Round	—	—	2–0	4–1	—
2	Dundee (Q)	4	3	0	1	0	8	2	+6	10	Qualification for the Second Round	1–1p	—	—	—	2–0
3	Raith Rovers	4	2	0	0	2	9	5	+4	6		—	1–2	—	2–0	—
4	Cowdenbeath	4	1	0	0	3	5	11	−6	3		—	0–3	—	—	4–2
5	Buckie Thistle	4	0	0	0	4	3	15	−12	0		0–3	—	1–6	—	—

Rules for classification: 1) goal difference, 2) goals scored, 3) away goals scored, 4) matches won, 5) away matches won, 6) drawing of lots.
(Q) Qualified to the phase indicated

=== Second Place Table ===
Pos	Grp	Team	Pld	W	PW	PL	L	GF	GA	GD	Pts	Qualification
1	D	Ross County (Q)	4	2	2	0	0	8	0	+8	10	Qualification for the Second Round
2	H	Partick Thistle (Q)	4	3	0	1	0	9	2	+7	10	Qualification for the Second Round
3	C	Dundee (Q)	4	3	0	1	0	8	2	+6	10	Qualification for the Second Round
4	E	Kilmarnock (Q)	4	3	0	0	1	9	3	+6	9	Qualification for the Second Round
5	B	Peterhead	4	3	0	0	1	7	6	+1	9	
6	F	Greenock Morton	4	2	1	0	1	8	6	+2	8	
7	A	Inverness CT	4	2	1	0	1	5	3	+2	8	
8	G	Albion Rovers	4	1	1	2	0	12	9	+3	7	

Rules for classification: 1) goal difference, 2) goals scored, 3) away goals scored, 4) matches won, 5) away matches won, 6) drawing of lots.
(Q) Qualified to the phase indicated

== Transfers ==
=== In ===
Date	Position	Nationality	Name	From	Fee
14 June 2017	MF	(England)	Roarie Deacon	Sutton United	Free
14 June 2017	MF	(Scotland)	Scott Allan	Celtic	Season-long loan
22 June 2017	DF	(Scotland)	Lewis Spence	Dunfermline	Free
28 June 2017	FW	(Netherlands)	Randy Wolters	Go Ahead Eagles	Free
5 July 2017	DF	(Scotland)	Jack Hendry	Wigan Athletic	Free
13 July 2017	MF	(Finland)	Glen Kamara	Arsenal	Free
14 July 2017	FW	(Tunisia)	Sofien Moussa	Lokomotiv GO	Free
20 July 2017	GK	(England)	Elliot Parish	Accrington Stanley	Free
18 August 2017	DF	(England)	Josh Meekings	Inverness	Free
30 August 2017	DF	(Spain)	Jon Aurtenetxe	SD Amorebieta	Free
31 August 2017	FW	(England)	A-Jay Leitch-Smith	Shrewsbury Town	Season-long loan
9 January 2018	GK	(France)	Jérémy Malherbe	FC Dynamo Brest	Free
31 January 2018	DF	(Wales)	Daniel Jefferies	Colchester United	Loan
31 January 2018	MF	(England)	Cedwyn Scott	Huddersfield Town	Free
31 January 2018	FW	(Scotland)	Simon Murray	Hibernian	Loan
2 February 2018	DF	(Angola)	Genseric Kusunga	União da Madeira	Free
8 February 2018	DF	(England)	Steven Caulker	Queens Park Rangers	Free

=== Out ===
Date	Position	Nationality	Name	To	Fee
31 May 2017	DF	(France)	Kévin Gomis		Released
31 May 2017	MF	(Scotland)	Calvin Colquhoun	Downfield Juniors	Free
1 June 2017	GK	(Scotland)	David Mitchell	Falkirk	Free
24 June 2017	DF	(Scotland)	Daniel Higgins	Kilmarnock	Free
4 July 2017	FW	(Scotland)	Rory Loy	Falkirk	Free
31 August 2017	MF	(England)	Tom Hateley		Released
12 January 2018	MF	(England)	Danny Williams	Accrington Stanley	Free
29 January 2018	MF	(Scotland)	James Vincent	Dunfermline Athletic	Loan
30 January 2018	DF	(Northern Ireland)	James McPake		Retired
31 January 2018	GK	(Scotland)	Scott Bain	Celtic	Loan
31 January 2018	DF	(Scotland)	Jack Hendry	Celtic	Undisclosed
5 February 2018	DF	(Scotland)	Nick Ross	Sepsi OSK	Free
23 February 2018	DF	(Bulgaria)	Kostadin Gadzhalov	Brechin City	Loan

== See also ==
- List of Dundee F.C. seasons
