= Jérémy Malherbe =

French footballer (born 1991)

Personal information
- Date of birth: 15 March 1991 (age 35)
- Place of birth: Strasbourg, France
- Height: 1.96 m (6 ft 5 in)
- Position: Goalkeeper

Youth career
- 2006–2010: Nancy

Senior career*
Years	Team	Apps	(Gls)
2010–2011	Grenoble	1	(0)
2011–2012	Gap	11	(0)
2012–2015	Reims	0	(0)
2013–2014	→ Reims II	11	(0)
2015–2016	Roeselare	32	(0)
2017	Dinamo Brest	21	(0)
2018	Dundee	0	(0)
2018–2020	Panionios	19	(0)
- * Club domestic league appearances and goals

Jérémy Malherbe (born 15 March 1991) is a French former professional footballer who played as a goalkeeper.

Malherbe signed a short-term contract with Scottish Premiership club Dundee in January 2018, and was released at the end of the season.

== Popularity in Serbia ==
Although Malherbe has never played football in Serbia, he has surprisingly accumulated a fairly noticeable number of fans in that country, and is a subject of a somewhat of a cult following. This curiosity is attributed to the users of the Serbian humour website Vukajlija, who jokingly claimed that Malherbe, then a member of Grenoble, sent them betting tips. Although the claims were quickly discovered to be false, the users soon formed an online fan club, posting updates about Malherbe's football career and achievements.

== Career statistics ==
As of match played 2 February 2020

Appearances and goals by club, season and competition
Club	Season	League			National cup		League cup		Other		Total	
Club	Season	Division	Apps	Goals	Apps	Goals	Apps	Goals	Apps	Goals	Apps	Goals
Grenoble	2010–11	Ligue 2	1	0	0	0	0	0	0	0	1	0
Gap	2011–12	CFA	11	0	0	0	–		0	0	11	0
Roeselare	2015–16	Belgian Second Division	32	0	0	0	–		0	0	32	0
Dinamo Brest	2017	Belarusian Premier League	21	0	6 (Note: Five appearances in the 2016–17 Belarusian Cup and one in the 2017–18 tournament)	0	–		2 (Note: Appearances in the Europa League)	0	29	0
Dundee	2017–18	Scottish Premiership	0	0	0	0	–		–		0	0
Panionios	2018–19	Super League Greece	7	0	1	0	–		–		8	0
Panionios	2019–20	Super League Greece	12	0	1	0	–		–		13	0
Panionios	Total		19	0	2	0	0	0	0	0	21	0
Career total			84	0	8	0	0	0	2	0	94	0
