= Jean Alassane Mendy =

Senegalese footballer (born 1990)

Personal information
- Full name: Jean Alassane Mendy
- Date of birth: 2 February 1990 (age 36)
- Place of birth: Dakar, Senegal
- Height: 1.78 m (5 ft 10 in)
- Position: Forward

Team information
- Current team: Loudéac OSC

Youth career
- 1999–2000: Stade Brest
- 2004–2005: Grüner Fotball IL
- 2008–2011: Vålerenga

Senior career*
Years	Team	Apps	(Gls)
2011	SM Caen B		
2011	Løv-Ham	11	(1)
2012	Elverum	25	(27)
2013–2014	Kristiansund	52	(27)
2015	Sandefjord	23	(6)
2016–2017	Kristiansund	50	(16)
2017–2018	Lokeren	2	(0)
2018–2019	Dundee	6	(0)
2019	HamKam	21	(2)
2020–	Loudéac OSC		
- * Club domestic league appearances and goals as of 1 January 2020

Jean Alassane Mendy (born 2 February 1990) is a Senegalese footballer.

He came to Løv-Ham in 2010. He made his debut for Løv-Ham in the 0-1 loss against Ranheim. Before the 2012 season he signed for 2. divisjon club Elverum where he scored 27 goals on 25 matches and helped Elverum get promoted to 1. divisjon. Before the 2013 season he signed a contract with Kristiansund where he became the clubs topscorer in 2013 and 2014. He signed a contract with Tippeligaen side Sandefjord in 2015.

Mendy signed a two-year contract with Scottish Premiership club Dundee in June 2018. His contract was terminated at the end of the 2018/19 season as the club were relegated.

== Career statistics ==
As of 16 June 2019

Appearances and goals by club, season and competition
Club	Season	League			Cup		League Cup		Other		Total	
Club	Season	Division	Apps	Goals	Apps	Goals	Apps	Goals	Apps	Goals	Apps	Goals
Løv-Ham	2011	1. divisjon	11	1	2	0	0	0	0	0	13	1
Elverum	2012	2. divisjon	25	27	1	0	0	0	0	0	26	27
Kristiansund	2013	1. divisjon	24	11	0	0	0	0	0	0	24	11
Kristiansund	2014	1. divisjon	28	16	3	4	0	0	0	0	31	20
Kristiansund	Total		52	27	3	4	0	0	0	0	55	31
Sandefjord	2015	Tippeligaen	23	6	4	1	0	0	0	0	27	7
Kristiansund	2016	1. divisjon	28	7	0	0	0	0	0	0	28	7
Kristiansund	2017	Eliteserien	22	9	5	2	0	0	0	0	27	11
Kristiansund	Total		50	16	5	2	0	0	0	0	55	18
Sporting Lokeren	2017–18	First Division A	2	0	0	0	0	0	0	0	2	0
Dundee	2018–19	Scottish Premiership	6	0	0	0	5	2	0	0	11	2
HamKam	2019	1. divisjon	21	2	1	0	0	0	0	0	22	2
Career Total			190	79	16	7	5	2	0	0	21	88
