= Mohamed Ben Othman =

Tunisian professional footballer

Personal information
- Full name: Mohamed Slim Ben Othman
- Date of birth: 18 November 1989 (age 36)
- Place of birth: Tunis, Tunisia
- Height: 1.80 m (5 ft 11 in)
- Position: Attacking midfielder

Team information
- Current team: Club Africain

Youth career
- AS Ariana

Senior career*
Years	Team	Apps	(Gls)
2009–2012	Stade Tunisien		
2010–2011	→ CS M'saken (loan)		
2012–2013	Metalurh Zaporizhya	16	(2)
2013	CS Sfaxien		
2014–2015	Angers	15	(1)
2016	Leixões	14	(2)
2016–2017	Lokomotiv GO	19	(0)
2017–2018	Orléans	2	(1)
2018–2019	Club Africain	0	(0)
- * Club domestic league appearances and goals as of 2017-06-21

Mohamed Slim Ben Othman (born 18 November 1989) is a Tunisian professional footballer who played as a midfielder for Club Africain.

== Club career ==
Ben Othman joined Ligue 2 side Angers SCO in 2014. He made his debut for the team a few weeks later, scoring the first goal in a 2–2 draw against Metz in March 2014.

On 12 October 2016, Ben Othman joined Bulgarian club Lokomotiv Gorna Oryahovitsa. Following the relegation to Second League, he bought out his contract and left the club in June 2017.

In June 2017, Ben Othman signed with Ligue 2 club Orléans.
