= Karl Madianga =

French footballer (born 1994)

Personal information
- Full name: Mayindou Karl Madianga
- Date of birth: 30 January 1994 (age 32)
- Place of birth: Le Mans, France
- Height: 1.72 m (5 ft 8 in)
- Position: Midfielder

Youth career
- 2003–2006: Union Le Mans Sud
- 2006–2011: Le Mans

Senior career*
Years	Team	Apps	(Gls)
2011–2013	Le Mans II	24	(3)
2013–2016	Saint-Étienne II	31	(1)
2017	Lokomotiv GO	9	(0)
2018–2019	Dundee	10	(1)
2022	Ekenäs IF	15	(0)

International career^{‡}
2011	France U17	4	(0)
- * Club domestic league appearances and goals as of 5 January 2023 ‡ National team caps and goals as of 5 July 2011

Mayindou Karl Madianga (born 30 January 1994) is a French footballer who plays as a midfielder.

== Career ==
Madianga began his career in his hometown club Le Mans. On 5 February 2017, he joined Bulgarian club Lokomotiv Gorna Oryahovitsa. He made his professional league debut on 2 April 2017 in a 5–0 home win against Vereya, coming on as substitute for Mohamed Ben Othman. Madianga didn't report back at the beginning of the 2017–18 season so the club has undertaken legal proceedings at FIFA.

Madianga signed for Scottish Premiership club Dundee in May 2018. He left the club on 31 January 2019.

After three years out of the senior game which he claimed was due to issues with his agent, Madianga returned to football with Finnish second tier side Ekenäs in January 2022, and would make 15 Ykkönen appearances in his season there.

== International career ==
Born in France, Madianga is of Republic of the Congo descent. He is a youth international for France.

== Career statistics ==
As of 24 May 2024.

Appearances and goals by club, season and competition
Club	Season	League			Cup (Note: Includes Coupe de France and Suomen Cup)		Other		Total	
Club	Season	Division	Apps	Goals	Apps	Goals	Apps	Goals	Apps	Goals
Le Mans II	2011–12	CFA	5	0	–		–		5	0
Le Mans II	2012–13	CFA	19	3	–		–		19	3
Le Mans II	Total		24	3	0	0	0	0	24	3
Le Mans	2012–13	Ligue 2	0	0	0	0	–		0	0
Saint-Étienne II	2013–14	CFA 2	7	0	–		–		7	0
Saint-Étienne II	2014–15	CFA	9	0	–		–		9	0
Saint-Étienne II	2015–16	CFA 2	15	1	–		–		15	1
Saint-Étienne II	Total		31	1	0	0	0	0	31	1
Saint-Étienne	2014–15	Ligue 1	0	0	0	0	–		0	0
Lokomotiv GO	2016–17	Bulgarian First League	9	0	–		–		9	0
Dundee	2018–19	Scottish Premiership	10	1	0	0	5 (Note: Includes Scottish League Cup)	1	15	2
Ekenäs IF	2022	Ykkönen	15	0	1	2	–		16	2
Career total			89	5	1	2	5	1	95	8
