= Keelan O'Connell =

English footballer

Personal information
- Date of birth: 30 November 1999 (age 26)
- Place of birth: Portsmouth, England
- Height: 1.72 m (5 ft 8 in)
- Position: Winger

Team information
- Current team: Poole Town
- Number: 19

Youth career
- 2009–2018: Bournemouth

Senior career*
| Years | Team | Apps | (Gls) |
| 2018–2021 | Bournemouth | 0 | (0) |
| 2019 | → Greenock Morton (loan) | 6 | (0) |
| 2021–2022 | Torquay United | 28 | (0) |
| 2022–2025 | Weymouth | 85 | (6) |
| 2025– | Poole Town | 5 | (0) |
- * Club domestic league appearances and goals as of 19:36, 3 September 2025 (UTC)

Keelan O'Connell (born 30 November 1999) is an English footballer who plays as a winger for Poole Town.

== Early and personal life ==
O'Connell was born in Portsmouth and attended St John's Primary School and Ferndown Upper School.

== Career ==
O'Connell joined Bournemouth in 2009, and turned professional during the 2015–16 season. He moved on loan to Greenock Morton in January 2019, making his senior debut on 16 February 2019, in a 0–0 league draw against Ayr United.

He signed for Torquay United on 19 July 2021. He moved to Weymouth in July 2022. After 2 seasons at Weymouth he signed for Poole Town of the Southern Premier League South, citing a lack of gametime under Weymouth's new manager.
