= Jordan Piggott =

English footballer

Personal information
- Full name: Jordan Christian John Piggott
- Date of birth: 17 February 1999 (age 27)
- Place of birth: Tipton, England
- Position: Defender

Team information
- Current team: Caernarfon Town
- Number: 4

Youth career
- 2015–2017: West Bromwich Albion

Senior career*
Years	Team	Apps	(Gls)
2017–2018	Dundee	1	(0)
2017–2018	→ East Fife (loan)	10	(0)
2018–2019	Bangor City		
2018	Alvechurch	3	(0)
2019–2020	Halesowen Town	17	(2)
2019	→ Sutton Coldfield (dual reg.)		
2020–2022	Solihull Moors	16	(0)
2021–2022	→ Gloucester City (loan)	5	(0)
2022	→ AFC Telford United (loan)	2	(0)
2022–2026	AFC Telford United		
2026–	Caernarfon Town	9	(0)
- * Club domestic league appearances and goals as of 11:50, 4 November 2026 (UTC)

Jordan Christian John Piggott (born 17 February 1999) is an English professional footballer who plays as a defender for Caernarfon Town.

== Club career ==
=== Dundee ===
On 28 July 2017, Piggott signed for Dundee after being released by West Bromwich Albion. On 21 October 2017, he joined East Fife on an emergency loan until January 2018. Piggott made his debut for Dundee in the Scottish Premiership in a 4–0 loss to St Johnstone on 10 March 2018. He came on as a sub in the 18th minute, and had a shot deflected off of him for an own goal in the 24th minute. He was released by Dundee at the end of the season.

=== Bangor City ===
On 12 October 2018, Piggott joined Welsh second division side Bangor City, after having to wait six weeks for international clearance to sign a deal.

=== Later career ===
In August 2018, Piggott played for Alvechurch FC.

In the summer 2019, Piggott joined Halesowen Town. In September 2019 it was reported that he had joined Sutton Coldfield, probably only on a dual registration.

In the summer of 2020, Piggott signed for National League side Solihull Moors. On 4 August 2021, Piggott joined National League North side Gloucester City on loan until 5 January 2022. On 11 January 2022, Piggott joined National League North side AFC Telford United on a short-term loan deal until 8 February 2022.

== Career statistics ==
As of 13 May 2018

Appearances and goals by club, season and competition
Club	Season	League			Scottish Cup		League Cup		Other		Total	
Club	Season	Division	Apps	Goals	Apps	Goals	Apps	Goals	Apps	Goals	Apps	Goals
West Bromwich Albion	2016–17	Premier League	0	0	0	0	0	0	1 (Note: Appearances for West Bromwich Albion under-23s in the EFL Trophy.)	0	1	0
Dundee	2017–18	Scottish Premiership	1	0	0	0	0	0	1 (Note: Appearances for Dundee under-20s in the Scottish Challenge Cup.)	0	2	0
East Fife (loan)	2017–18	Scottish League One	10	0	0	0	0	0	0	0	10	0
Career total			11	0	0	0	0	0	2	0	13	0
