= Vukajlija =

Serbian website

Vukajlija is a popular Serbia-based slang dictionary. The site mainly consists of often humorous definitions, observations and (not rarely vulgar) explanations of slang terms. It is similar to Urban Dictionary.

The name Vukajlija is itself a word play on Vujaklija, the surname of Serbian linguist Milan Vujaklija whose most notable work is Lexicon of foreign words and terms (Leksikon stranih reči i izraza, Лексикон страних речи и израза), first published in 1937. In the Balkans, dictionaries are often colloquially known by the names of their author and thus Vujaklija's dictionary is known as Vujaklija, leading to the word play in question. Also, the similarity in names may have contributed to early popularity of the site, as a number of people searching for Vukajlija in error instead of Vujaklija reached the site.
