= Elton Ngwatala =

French footballer (born 1993)

Personal information
- Date of birth: 23 May 1993 (age 33)
- Place of birth: Corbeil-Essonnes, France
- Height: 1.77 m (5 ft 10 in)
- Position: Winger

Senior career*
Years	Team	Apps	(Gls)
2012–2013	Beauvais II	12	(0)
2013–2014	Beauvais	24	(3)
2014–2015	Chambly	22	(1)
2015–2018	Kidderminster Harriers	88	(15)
2018–2019	Dundee	9	(1)
2019	AFC Fylde	3	(0)
2019–2020	Chester	8	(0)
2022–2023	AC Cambrai		
- * Club domestic league appearances and goals as of 03:52, 15 December 2022 (UTC)

Elton Ngwatala (born 23 May 1993) is a French professional footballer who plays as a winger.

== Career ==
Born in Corbeil-Essonnes, Ngwatala spent his early career with Beauvais II, Beauvais, Chambly and Kidderminster Harriers. In May 2017 he attended the V9 Academy.

In May 2018 it was announced that he would join Scottish club Dundee for the 2018–19 season. He made his debut for the club on 14 July 2018, in the Scottish League Cup. Ngwatala was released by the club in January 2019.

Ngwatala signed for AFC Fylde on 24 August 2019, on a non-contract basis. He moved to Chester on 29 November 2019.

In September 2022, Ngwatala returned from a nearly 3-year hiatus from competitive football after signing with sixth-tier French club AC Cambrai.

== Early life ==
He is the son of Louison Ngwatala, a former footballer for AS Vita Club.
