= 2021–22 Dunfermline Athletic F.C. season =

Dunfermline Athletic
2021–22 season
- Chairman: Ross McArthur
- Manager: Peter Grant (until 31 October); Greg Shields & Steven Whittaker (interim managers) (31 October to 12 November); John Hughes (from 12 November)
- Stadium: East End Park; Dunfermline, Scotland (Capacity: 11,480)
- Championship: Ninth (Relegated via play-off)
- League Cup: Second round, lost to Rangers
- Challenge Cup: Second round, lost to Elgin City
- Scottish Cup: Third round, lost to Partick Thistle
- Top goalscorer: League: Kevin O'Hara (6); All: Kevin O'Hara (9)
- Highest home attendance: League: 5,406 vs. Queen of the South (29 April 2022)
- Lowest home attendance: League: 556 vs. Hamilton Academical (15 January 2022)
- Average home league attendance: 3,614(537 (Note: Compared with 2019–20 season, as no fans were admitted into stadiums during the 2020–21 season due to the COVID-19 pandemic))
Home colours	Away colours
- All statistics correct as of 16 May 2022.

The 2021–22 season was Dunfermline Athletic's sixth season in the Scottish Championship, having finished 4th in the 2020–21 season.

== Squad list ==
As of 7 May 2022

No.	Name	Nationality	Position	Date of birth (age)	Signed from	Signed in	Signed until	Apps.	Goals
Goalkeepers
29	Deniz Mehmet	(Turkey)	GK	19 September 1992 (age 33)	Dundee United	2021	2023	8	0
41	Jakub Stolarczyk	(Poland)	GK	19 December 2000 (age 25)	(England) Leicester City	2022	2022	12	0
Defenders
2	Aaron Comrie	(Scotland)	DF	3 February 1997 (age 28)	St Johnstone	2019	2023	91	3
3	Josh Edwards	(Scotland)	DF	27 May 2000 (age 25)	Airdrieonians	2019	2023	83	2
4	Lewis Martin	(Scotland)	DF	8 April 1996 (age 29)	Dunfermline Athletic youth teams	2012	2022	170	5
5	Coll Donaldson	(Scotland)	DF	9 April 1995 (age 30)	Ross County	2022	2022	18	2
6	Kyle MacDonald	(Scotland)	DF	11 January 2000 (age 26)	Airdrieonians	2021	2023	19	1
12	Rhys Breen	(Scotland)	DF	6 January 2000 (age 26)	Rangers	2021	2023	11	0
19	Miller Fenton	(Scotland)	DF	16 October 2003 (age 22)	Fife Elite Football Academy	2019	2024	1	0
22	Leon Jones	(Scotland)	DF	28 February 1998 (age 27)	(United States) Kentucky Wildcats	2021	2022	2	0
25	Efe Ambrose	(Nigeria)	DF	18 October 1988 (age 37)	St Johnstone	2022	2022	14	0
Midfielders
8	Joe Chalmers	(Scotland)	MF	3 January 1994 (age 32)	Ayr United	2022	2023	16	0
11	Ryan Dow	(Scotland)	MF	7 June 1991 (age 34)	Peterhead	2019	2022	68	10
16	Dan Pybus	(England)	MF	12 December 1997 (age 28)	Queen of the South	2021	2022	36	1
17	Graham Dorrans	(Scotland)	MF	5 May 1987 (age 38)	(Australia) Western Sydney Wanderers	2021	2023	22	1
18	Paul Allan	(Scotland)	MF	7 February 2000 (age 25)	Fife Elite Football Academy	2017	2024	18	0
21	Steven Lawless	(Scotland)	MF	12 April 1991 (age 34)	Motherwell	2022	2022	20	3
23	Dom Thomas	(Scotland)	MF	14 February 1996 (age 29)	Kilmarnock	2020	2022	58	6
26	Matthew Todd	(Scotland)	MF	14 June 2001 (age 24)	Fife Elite Football Academy	2018	2024	39	2
28	Reece Cole	(England)	MF	17 February 1998 (age 27)	(England) Queens Park Rangers	2021	2022	12	1
39	Liam Polworth	(Scotland)	MF	3 January 1994 (age 32)	Kilmarnock	2022	2022	11	0
Forwards
7	Kevin O'Hara	(Scotland)	FW	11 August 1998 (age 27)	Alloa Athletic	2020	2023	70	22
9	Craig Wighton	(Scotland)	FW	27 July 1997 (age 28)	Heart of Midlothian	2021	2023	28	9
10	Nikolay Todorov	(Bulgaria)	FW	24 August 1996 (age 29)	Inverness CT	2021	2023	26	6
14	Lewis McCann	(Northern Ireland)	FW	7 June 2001 (age 24)	Fife Elite Football Academy	2018	2024	55	5
27	Bobby Kamwa	(Cameroon)	FW	18 March 2000 (age 25)	(England) Leeds United	2022	2022	8	0

== Results & fixtures ==
Win Draw Loss Postponed

=== Pre-season ===
23 June 2021 Friendly	The Spartans	2 – 2	Dunfermline Athletic	Edinburgh, Scotland
19:45	Jones 45', 89'	Match report	O'Hara 26'; Thomas 74' (pen.); Omar (Note: Trialist) (red card) 19'	Stadium: Ainslie Park; Referee: Stuart

26 June 2021 Friendly	Civil Service Strollers	2 – 2	Dunfermline Athletic	Edinburgh, Scotland
13:00	Duffy 44'; Valentine 85'	Match report	O'Hara 26'; Todorov 85'	Stadium: Christie Gillies Park; Attendance: 199

=== Scottish Championship ===
31 July 2021 Match 1	Greenock Morton	2 – 2	Dunfermline Athletic	Greenock, Scotland
15:00	Oliver 23' (pen.); McGrattan 81'	BBC Sport report	Todorov 50'; O'Hara 74'	Stadium: Cappielow; Attendance: 821; Referee: Collum

7 August 2021 Match 2	Dunfermline Athletic	0 – 3	Partick Thistle	Dunfermline, Scotland
15:00		BBC Sport report	Docherty 7'; Holt 22'; Graham 78 o.g.'	Stadium: East End Park; Attendance: 2,000; Referee: Craig Napier

28 August 2021 Match 3	Dunfermline Athletic	0 – 3	Arbroath	Dunfermline, Scotland
15:00		BBC Sport report	McKenna 12', 67'; Gold 44'	Stadium: East End Park; Attendance: 2,928; Referee: Mike Roncone

11 September 2021 Match 4	Ayr United	3 – 1	Dunfermline Athletic	Ayr, Scotland
15:00	Adeloye 3', 63'; Salkeld 25'	BBC Sport report	Todorov 28'	Stadium: Somerset Park; Attendance: 1,553; Referee: Barry Cook

18 September 2021 Match 5	Dunfermline Athletic	0 – 0	Inverness CT	Dunfermline, Scotland
15:00		BBC Sport report		Stadium: East End Park; Attendance: 3,158; Referee: David Munro

25 September 2021 Match 6	Dunfermline Athletic	0 – 0	Hamilton Academical	Dunfermline, Scotland
15:00		BBC Sport report		Stadium: East End Park; Attendance: 3,150; Referee: Scott Lambie

29 September 2021 Match 7	Raith Rovers	1 – 1	Dunfermline Athletic	Kirkcaldy, Scotland
19:30	Zanatta 25'	BBC Sport report	O'Hara 79'	Stadium: Stark's Park; Attendance: 2,876; Referee: Euan Anderson

2 October 2021 Match 8	Queen of the South	1 – 0	Dunfermline Athletic	Dumfries, Scotland
15:00	Connelly 85'	BBC Sport report		Stadium: Palmerston Park; Attendance: 1,071; Referee: Steven McLean

16 October 2021 Match 9	Dunfermline Athletic	2 – 2	Kilmarnock	Dunfermline, Scotland
15:00	Thomas 74'; Comrie 90+5'	BBC Sport report	Hendry 68'; Shaw 75'	Stadium: East End Park; Attendance: 4,095; Referee: Greg Aitken

23 October 2021 Match 10	Partick Thistle	0 – 0	Dunfermline Athletic	Glasgow, Scotland
15:00		BBC Sport report		Stadium: Firhill Stadium; Attendance: 3,333; Referee: Grant Irvine

26 October 2021 Match 11	Dunfermline Athletic	1 – 1	Raith Rovers	Dunfermline, Scotland
19:45	Thomas 50'	BBC Sport report	Spencer 88'	Stadium: East End Park; Attendance: 4,450; Referee: Alan Muir

30 October 2021 Match 12	Arbroath	4 – 2	Dunfermline Athletic	Arbroath, Scotland
15:00	O'Brien 15'; McKenna 37', 85 pen.' Linn 77'	BBC Sport report	O'Hara 8', 12'	Stadium: Gayfield Park; Attendance: 1,359; Referee: David Dickinson

6 November 2021 Match 13	Dunfermline Athletic	1 – 3	Greenock Morton	Dunfermline, Scotland
15:00	Todd 35'	BBC Sport report	Oliver 13', 87 pen.' Ugwu 60'	Stadium: East End Park; Attendance: Bobby Madden; Referee: 3,531

13 November 2021 Match 14	Inverness CT	1 – 2	Dunfermline Athletic	Inverness, Scotland
15:00	McKay 22'	BBC Sport report	McCann 51'; Thomas 64'	Stadium: Caledonian Stadium; Attendance: 2,111; Referee: Grant Irvine

20 November 2021 Match 15	Dunfermline Athletic	3 – 0	Ayr United	Dunfermline, Scotland
15:00	McCann 14', 52'; Dow 40'	BBC Sport report		Stadium: East End Park; Attendance: 3,503; Referee: Alan Newlands

4 December 2021 Match 16	Hamilton Academical	1 – 0	Dunfermline Athletic	Hamilton, Scotland
15:00	Moyo 61 pen.'	BBC Sport report		Stadium: New Douglas Park; Attendance: 1,175; Referee: David Munro

11 December 2021 Match 17	Dunfermline Athletic	3 – 3	Queen of the South	Dunfermline, Scotland
15:00	Kennedy 21'; Connolly 54'; McCann 88'	BBC Sport report	Cooper 3'; Connelly 48'; Cameron 65'	Stadium: East End Park; Attendance: 3,425; Referee: Don Robertson

26 December 2021 Match 19	Dunfermline Athletic	0 – 3	Arbroath	Dunfermline, Scotland
15:00		BBC Sport report	Breen 6 o.g.' McKenna 45'; Dowds 81'	Stadium: East End Park; Attendance: 500; Referee: Alan Muir

2 January 2022 Match 20	Raith Rovers	0 – 0	Dunfermline Athletic	Kirkcaldy, Scotland
15:00		BBC Sport report		Stadium: Stark's Park; Attendance: 500; Referee: David Munro

8 January 2022 Match 21	Greenock Morton	5 – 0	Dunfermline Athletic	Greenock, Scotland
15:00	Oliver 35'; Blues 40'; Reilly 45+1'; Donaldson 72 o.g.' Muirhead 79'	BBC Sport report		Stadium: Cappielow; Attendance: 429; Referee: Kevin Clancy

15 January 2021 Match 22	Dunfermline Athletic	1 – 0	Hamilton Academical	Dunfermline, Scotland
15:00	Dow 32'	BBC Sport report		Stadium: East End Park; Attendance: 556; Referee: Bobby Madden

22 January 2021 Match 23	Dunfermline Athletic	1 – 1	Inverness Caledonian Thistle	Dunfermline, Scotland
15:00	Lawless 80 pen.'	BBC Sport report	Sutherland 39'	Stadium: East End Park; Attendance: 3,138; Referee: Steven Reid

29 January 2022 Match 24	Queen of the South	0 – 2	Dunfermline Athletic	Dumfries, Scotland
15:00		BBC Sport report	Dorrans 22'; Pybus 29'	Stadium: Palmerston Park; Referee: Greg Aitken

5 February 2022 Match 25	Ayr United	1 – 1	Dunfermline Athletic	Ayr, Scotland
15:00	Martin 17 o.g.'	BBC Sport report	Donaldson 10'	Stadium: Somerset Park; Attendance: 1,611; Referee: Alan Muir

12 February 2022 Match 18	Kilmarnock	2 – 1	Dunfermline Athletic	Kilmarnock, Scotland
15:00	Lafferty 67', 83'	BBC Sport report	Lawless 59'; Comrie (red card) 90+3'	Stadium: Rugby Park; Attendance: 3,698; Referee: Craig Napier
Note: Match rescheduled due to foggy conditions.

26 February 2022 Match 27	Dunfermline Athletic	0 – 0	Kilmarnock	Dunfermline, Scotland
15:00		BBC Sport report		Stadium: East End Park; Attendance: 4,083; Referee: Gavin Duncan

5 March 2022 Match 28	Arbroath	1 – 0	Dunfermline Athletic	Arbroath, Scotland
15:00	Gold 9'	BBC Sport report		Stadium: Gayfield Park; Referee: Chris Graham

12 March 2022 Match 29	Hamilton Academical	2 – 2	Dunfermline Athletic	Hamilton, Scotland
15:00	Moyo 25', 77'	BBC Sport report	Donaldson 6'; Lawless 52 pen.'	Stadium: New Douglas Park; Attendance: 1,369; Referee: Greg Aitken

18 March 2022 Match 30	Dunfermline Athletic	1 – 1	Greenock Morton	Dunfermline, Scotland
19:45	McCann 88'	BBC Sport report	Wilson 42'	Stadium: East End Park; Attendance: 4,593; Referee: Kevin Clancy

22 March 2022 Match 26	Dunfermline Athletic	4 – 1	Partick Thistle	Dunfermline, Scotland
19:45	Mayo 10 o.g.' Todd 22'; Edwards 27'; Thomas 82'	BBC Sport report	Docherty 5'	Stadium: East End Park; Attendance: 3,380; Referee: Steven McLean

26 March 2022 Match 31	Inverness Caledonian Thistle	2 – 0	Dunfermline Athletic	Inverness, Scotland
15:00	McAlear 58'; Samuels 77'	BBC Sport report		Stadium: Caledonian Stadium; Attendance: 2,171; Referee: Graham Beaton

6 April 2022 Match 32	Dunfermline Athletic	2 – 0	Raith Rovers	Dunfermline, Scotland
19:45	O'Hara 33', 79'	BBC Sport report		Stadium: East End Park; Attendance: 5,199; Referee: Nick Walsh

9 April 2022 Match 33	Kilmarnock	2 – 0	Dunfermline Athletic	Kilmarnock, Scotland
15:00	Lafferty 26'; Shaw 76'	BBC Sport report		Stadium: Rugby Park; Attendance: 5,013; Referee: Steven Kirkland

16 April 2022 Match 34	Dunfermline Athletic	2 – 1	Ayr United	Dunfermline, Scotland
19:45	Cole 79'; Todorov 86'	BBC Sport report		Stadium: East End Park; Attendance: 4,855; Referee: Colin Steven

23 April 2022 Match 35	Partick Thistle	1 – 0	Dunfermline Athletic	Glasgow, Scotland
15:00	Docherty 15'	BBC Sport report		Stadium: Firhill Stadium; Attendance: 3,428; Referee: Don Robertson

29 April 2022 Match 36	Dunfermline Athletic	1 – 2	Queen of the South	Dunfermline, Scotland
19:45	Edwards 6'	BBC Sport report	Chalmers 51 o.g.' O'Connor 71'	Stadium: East End Park; Attendance: 5,406; Referee: David Munro

=== Championship play-off ===
4 May 2022 Semi-final 1st Leg	Queen's Park	0 – 0	Dunfermline Athletic	Glasgow, Scotland
19:45		BBC Sport report		Stadium: Firhill Stadium; Attendance: 1,403; Referee: Colin Steven

7 May 2022 Semi-final 2nd Leg	Dunfermline Athletic	0 – 1	Queen's Park	Dunfermline, Scotland
15:00	Ambrose (red card) 58'	BBC Sport report	Murray 89'	Stadium: East End Park; Attendance: 3,179; Referee: Craig Napier

=== Scottish League Cup ===
==== Group stage ====
10 July 2021 1	Partick Thistle	2 – 4	Dunfermline Athletic	Maryhill, Scotland
15:00	Graham 16'; Rudden 65'	BBC Sport report	Todorov 30', 53'; Comrie 35'; Macdonald 43'	Stadium: Firhill; Attendance: 1,000; Referee: Madden

13 July 2021 2	St Mirren	1 – 0	Dunfermline Athletic	Paisley, Scotland
19:45	Main 30'	BBC Sport report		Stadium: St Mirren Park; Attendance: 500; Referee: Napier

17 July 2021 3	Dunfermline Athletic	5 – 1	Dumbarton	Dunfermline, Scotland
15:00	Todorov 2'; Thomas 4'; Wighton 29'; Buchanan 51 o.g.' O'Hara 71'	BBC Sport report	MacLean 56'	Stadium: East End Park; Attendance: 1,000; Referee: Dickinson

24 July 2021 4	Dunfermline Athletic	4 – 1	Stenhousemuir	Dunfermline, Scotland
15:00	Wighton 15', 44'; O'Hara 36', 49'	BBC Sport report	Thomson 67'	Stadium: East End Park; Attendance: 1,570; Referee: Clancy

==== Knockout round ====
13 August 2021 Second round	Rangers	5 – 0	Dunfermline Athletic	Glasgow, Scotland
19:30	Lundstram 3'; Wright 17'; Hagi 19'; Roofe 33', 58 pen.'	Report		Stadium: Ibrox Stadium; Attendance: 41,467; Referee: William Collum

=== Scottish Challenge Cup ===
4 September 2021 Second round	Elgin City	3 – 0 (awarded)	Dunfermline Athletic	Elgin
15:00				Stadium: Borough Briggs

Notes

1. A: Elgin City were awarded a technical 3–0 win over Dunfermline Athletic who were unable to fulfil the fixture as a number of players were self-isolating due to the COVID-19 pandemic in Scotland.

=== Scottish Cup ===
27 November Third Round	Partick Thistle	1 – 0	Dunfermline Athletic	Glasgow, Scotland
15:00	Docherty 82'	BBC Sport report		Stadium: Firhill Stadium; Attendance: 2,198; Referee: John Beaton

== Squad statistics ==
=== Appearances and goals ===
As of 7 May 2022

No.	Pos	Nat	Player	Total		Scottish Championship		League Cup		Scottish Challenge Cup		Scottish Cup	
No.	Pos	Nat	Player	Apps	Goals	Apps	Goals	Apps	Goals	Apps	Goals	Apps	Goals
2	DF	(Scotland) SCO	Aaron Comrie	38	2	27+5	1	5	1	0	0	1	0
3	DF	(Scotland) SCO	Josh Edwards	43	2	37	2	5	0	0	0	1	0
4	DF	(Scotland) SCO	Lewis Martin	7	0	5+2	0	0	0	0	0	0	0
5	DF	(Scotland) SCO	Coll Donaldson	18	2	18	2	0	0	0	0	0	0
7	FW	(Scotland) SCO	Kevin O'Hara	40	9	23+11	6	5	3	0	0	0+1	0
8	MF	(Scotland) SCO	Joe Chalmers	16	0	16	0	0	0	0	0	0	0
10	FW	(Bulgaria) BUL	Nikolay Todorov	27	6	9+12	3	5	3	0	0	0+1	0
11	MF	(Scotland) SCO	Ryan Dow	35	2	29+4	2	0+1	0	0	0	1	0
12	DF	(Scotland) SCO	Rhys Breen	11	0	7+4	0	0	0	0	0	0	0
14	FW	(Northern Ireland) NIR	Lewis McCann	25	5	14+10	5	0	0	0	0	1	0
16	MF	(England) ENG	Dan Pybus	38	1	27+6	1	2+3	0	0	0	0	0
17	MF	(Scotland) SCO	Graham Dorrans	23	1	19+2	1	1	0	0	0	1	0
18	MF	(Scotland) SCO	Paul Allan	17	0	11+2	0	3+1	0	0	0	0	0
19	DF	(Scotland) SCO	Miller Fenton	1	0	0	0	0+1	0	0	0	0	0
21	MF	(Scotland) SCO	Steven Lawless	19	3	19	3	0	0	0	0	0	0
22	DF	(Scotland) SCO	Leon Jones	2	0	2	0	0	0	0	0	0	0
23	MF	(Scotland) SCO	Dom Thomas	31	5	16+9	4	4+1	1	0	0	1	0
25	DF	(Nigeria) NGA	Efe Ambrose	14	0	14	0	0	0	0	0	0	0
26	MF	(Scotland) SCO	Matty Todd	25	1	20+2	1	0+2	0	0	0	1	0
27	FW	(Cameroon) CMR	Bobby Kamwa	8	0	0+8	0	0	0	0	0	0	0
28	MF	(England) ENG	Reece Cole	12	1	3+7	1	1+1	0	0	0	0	0
29	GK	(Turkey) TUR	Deniz Mehmet	8	0	5	0	3	0	0	0	0	0
39	MF	(Scotland) SCO	Liam Polworth	10	0	8+2	0	0+0	0	0	0	0	0
41	GK	(Poland) POL	Jakub Stolarczyk	12	0	12	0	0	0	0	0	0	0
Players away from the club on loan:
6	DF	(Scotland) SCO	Kyle MacDonald (on loan at Airdrieonians)	15	1	8+1	0	5	1	0	0	1	0
9	FW	(Scotland) SCO	Craig Wighton (on loan at Arbroath)	18	3	7+6	0	4+1	3	0	0	0	0
Players who left during the season:
1	GK	(Wales) WAL	Owain Fôn Williams	23	0	20	0	2	0	0	0	1	0
5	DF	(Scotland) SCO	Ross Graham	9	0	3+1	0	5	0	0	0	0	0
8	MF	(Scotland) SCO	Kai Kennedy	14	1	8+5	1	0+1	0	0	0	0	0
13	DF	(Lithuania) LTU	Vytas Gašpuitis	15	0	11	0	1+2	0	0	0	1	0
15	MF	(Scotland) SCO	Iain Wilson	3	0	0+3	0	0	0	0	0	0	0
30	GK	(Scotland) SCO	Fraser Currid	0	0	0	0	0	0	0	0	0	0
33	DF	(Republic of Ireland) IRL	Mark Connolly	14	1	13	1	0	0	0	0	1	0
44	DF	(Scotland) SCO	Paul Watson	10	0	6	0	4	0	0	0	0	0

=== Goalscorers ===
As of match played 7 May 2022

Ranking	Position	Nation	Name	Total	Scottish Championship	Scottish League Cup	Scottish Challenge Cup	Scottish Cup
1	FW	(Scotland)	Kevin O'Hara	9	6	3		
2	FW	(Bulgaria)	Nikolay Todorov	6	3	3		
3	FW	(Scotland)	Lewis McCann	5	5			
3	MF	(Scotland)	Dom Thomas	5	4	1		
5	MF	(Scotland)	Steven Lawless	3	3			
5	FW	(Scotland)	Craig Wighton	3		3		
7	DF	(Scotland)	Coll Donaldson	2	2			
7	DF	(Scotland)	Josh Edwards	2	2			
7	MF	(Scotland)	Ryan Dow	2	2			
7	MF	(Scotland)	Matthew Todd	2	2			
7	DF	(Scotland)	Aaron Comrie	2	1	1		
12	DF	(England)	Reece Cole	1	1			
12	DF	(Republic of Ireland)	Mark Connolly	1	1			
12	MF	(Scotland)	Graham Dorrans	1	1			
12	MF	(Scotland)	Kai Kennedy	1	1			
12	MF	(England)	Dan Pybus	1	1			
12	DF	(Scotland)	Kyle MacDonald	1		1		
—			Own goal	1	1			
Total				48	36	12	0	0

=== Disciplinary record ===
As of match played 7 May 2022

Squad number	Position	Nation	Name	Total		Scottish Championship		Scottish League Cup		Scottish Challenge Cup		Scottish Cup	
Squad number	Position	Nation	Name	Booked	Sent off (straight red)	Booked	Sent off (straight red)	Booked	Sent off (straight red)	Booked	Sent off (straight red)	Booked	Sent off (straight red)
1	GK	(Wales)	Owain Fôn Williams	1		1							
2	DF	(Scotland)	Aaron Comrie	3	1	3	1						
3	DF	(Scotland)	Josh Edwards	2		2							
5	DF	(Scotland)	Ross Graham	6		5		1					
5	DF	(Scotland)	Coll Donaldson	2		2							
7	FW	(Scotland)	Kevin O'Hara	3		3							
8	MF	(Scotland)	Kai Kennedy	1		1							
8	MF	(Scotland)	Joe Chalmers	1		1							
10	FW	(Bulgaria)	Nikolay Todorov	3		2		1					
11	MF	(Scotland)	Ryan Dow	4		3		1				1	
12	DF	(Scotland)	Rhys Breen	1		1							
14	FW	(Scotland)	Lewis McCann	6		6							
16	MF	(England)	Dan Pybus	11		10		1					
17	MF	(Scotland)	Graham Dorrans	5	1	4	1					1	
18	FW	(Scotland)	Paul Allan	3		2		1					
21	MF	(Scotland)	Steven Lawless	1		1							
23	MF	(Scotland)	Dom Thomas	2		2							
25	DF	(Nigeria)	Efe Ambrose	1	1	1	1						
26	MF	(Scotland)	Matty Todd	1		1							
28	MF	(England)	Reece Cole	2		2							
29	GK	(Turkey)	Deniz Mehmet	1		1							
33	DF	(Republic of Ireland)	Mark Connolly	3		3							
39	MF	(Scotland)	Liam Polworth	1		1							
44	DF	(Scotland)	Paul Watson	2		1		1					
Total				64	2	54	1	6	0	0	0	2	0

== Club statistics ==
=== League table ===
Pos	Team	Pld	W	D	L	GF	GA	GD	Pts	Promotion, qualification or relegation
6	Hamilton Academical	36	10	12	14	38	53	−15	42	
7	Greenock Morton	36	9	13	14	36	47	−11	40	
8	Ayr United	36	9	12	15	39	52	−13	39	
9	Dunfermline Athletic (R)	36	7	14	15	36	53	−17	35	Qualification for the Championship play-offs
10	Queen of the South (R)	36	8	9	19	36	54	−18	33	Relegation to League One

Rules for classification: 1) Points; 2) Goal difference; 3) Goals scored; 4) Head-to-to head points; 5) Head-to-head goal difference; 6) Play-off (only for deciding promotion, play-off participation and relegation).
(R) Relegated

==== Results by round ====
Round	1	2	3	4	5	6	7	8	9	10	11	12	13	14	15	16	17	18	19	20	21	22	23	24	25	26	27	28	29	30	31	32	33	34	35	36
Ground	A	H	H	A	H	H	A	A	H	A	H	A	H	A	H	A	H	H	A	A	H	H	A	A	A	H	A	A	H	H	A	H	A	H	A	H
Result	D	L	L	L	D	D	D	L	D	D	D	L	L	W	W	L	D	L	D	L	W	D	W	D	L	D	L	D	D	W	L	W	L	W	L	L
Position	5	9	10	10	10	10	10	10	10	10	10	10	10	10	6	9	8	8	9	9	10	10	9	7	9	9	10	10	10	9	9	9	9	9	9	9

Updated to match(es) played on 29 April 2022. Source: dafc.co.uk
A = Away; H = Home; W = Win; D = Draw; L = Loss

==== Results summary ====
Overall								Home						Away					
Pld	W	D	L	GF	GA	GD	Pts	W	D	L	GF	GA	GD	W	D	L	GF	GA	GD
36	7	14	15	36	53	−17	35	5	8	5	22	24	−2	2	6	10	14	29	−15

Last updated: 29 September 2021.
Source: dafc.co.uk

=== League cup table ===
Pos	Team	Pld	W	PW	PL	L	GF	GA	GD	Pts	Qualification	STM	DNF	PAR	STE	DUM
1	St Mirren	4	4	0	0	0	9	1	+8	12	Qualification for the second round	—	1–0	2–0	—	—
2	Dunfermline Athletic	4	3	0	0	1	13	5	+8	9	Qualification for the second round	—	—	—	4–1	5–1
3	Partick Thistle	4	2	0	0	2	6	7	−1	6		—	2–4	—	—	2–0
4	Stenhousemuir	4	1	0	0	3	5	10	−5	3		1–3	—	1–2	—	—
5	Dumbarton	4	0	0	0	4	2	12	−10	0		0–3 (Note: St Mirren were awarded a technical 3−0 win over Dumbarton, who were unable to raise a team after a COVID-19 outbreak among players and staff.)	—	—	1–2	—

Rules for classification: 1) goal difference, 2) goals scored, 3) away goals scored, 4) matches won, 5) away matches won, 6) drawing of lots.

== Transfers ==
=== First team ===
==== Players in ====
Date	Position	No.	Nationality	Name	From	Fee	Ref.
1 June 2021	FW	9	(Scotland)	Craig Wighton	Heart of Midlothian	Free	
15 June 2021	FW	10	(Bulgaria)	Nikolay Todorov	Inverness CT	Free	
23 June 2021	GK	29	(Turkey)	Deniz Mehmet	Dundee United	Free	
25 June 2021	GK	30	(Scotland)	Fraser Currid	Alloa Athletic	Free	
2 July 2021	MF	16	(England)	Dan Pybus	Queen of the South	Free	
20 July 2021	MF	28	(England)	Reece Cole	(England) Queens Park Rangers	Free	
26 July 2021	DF	12	(Scotland)	Rhys Breen	Rangers	Free	
27 July 2021	MF	17	(Scotland)	Graham Dorrans	(Australia) Western Sydney Wanderers	Free	
3 August 2021	DF	22	(Scotland)	Leon Jones	(United States) Kentucky Wildcats	Free	
27 December 2021	MF	21	(Scotland)	Steven Lawless	Motherwell	Free	
24 January 2022	MF	8	(Scotland)	Joe Chalmers	Ayr United	Undisclosed	

==== Players out ====
Date	Position	No.	Nationality	Name	To	Fee	Ref.
31 May 2021	DF	5	(Scotland)	Euan Murray	Kilmarnock	Free	
31 May 2021	MF	12	(Scotland)	Scott Cusick	Broomhill	Free	
31 May 2021	GK	20	(Scotland)	Cammy Gill	Cowdenbeath	Free	
31 May 2021	MF	27	(Scotland)	Lucas Berry	Edinburgh City	Free	
31 May 2021	GK	30	(Scotland)	Ben Swinton	(England) Berwick Rangers	Free	
31 May 2021	MF	—	(Scotland)	Kyle Turner	Partick Thistle	Free	
31 May 2021	FW	—	(England)	Gabby McGill	Airdrieonians	Free	
3 June 2021	MF	16	(Scotland)	Steven Whittaker	Retired		
14 June 2021	FW	10	(Scotland)	Declan McManus	(Wales) The New Saints	£60,000	
19 October 2021	DF	44	(Scotland)	Paul Watson	Falkirk	Free	
3 January 2022	DF	13	(Lithuania)	Vytas Gašpuitis	(Lithuania) Šiauliai	Free	
19 January 2022	GK	30	(Scotland)	Fraser Currid	Bo'ness Athletic	Free	
30 January 2022	MF	15	(Scotland)	Iain Wilson	Greenock Morton	Free	
28 February 2022	GK	1	(Wales)	Owain Fôn Williams	Retired		

==== Loans in ====
Date	Position	No.	Nationality	Name	From	Duration	Ref.
1 July 2021	DF	5	(Scotland)	Ross Graham	Dundee United	End of season (recalled in January)	
22 July 2021	MF	8	(Scotland)	Kai Kennedy	Rangers	End of season (recalled in January)	
29 September 2021	DF	33	(Republic of Ireland)	Mark Connolly	Dundee United	16 January 2022	
3 January 2022	DF	33	(Scotland)	Coll Donaldson	Ross County	30 May 2022	
27 January 2022	FW	27	(Cameroon)	Bobby Kamwa	(England) Leeds United	30 May 2022	
31 January 2022	GK	41	(Poland)	Jakub Stolarczyk	(England) Leicester City	30 May 2022	
4 February 2022	DF	25	(Nigeria)	Efe Ambrose	St Johnstone	30 May 2022	
28 February 2022	MF	39	(Scotland)	Liam Polworth	Kilmarnock	30 May 2022	

==== Loans out ====
Date	Position	No.	Nationality	Name	To	Duration	Ref.
25 June 2021	GK	30	(Scotland)	Fraser Currid	Bo'ness Athletic	End of Season	
14 January 2022	FW	9	(Scotland)	Craig Wighton	Arbroath	End of Season	
24 January 2022	DF	6	(Scotland)	Kyle MacDonald	Airdrieonians	End of Season	

== Contract extensions ==
Date	Position	Nationality	Name	Length	Expiry	Ref.
31 May 2021	DF	(Scotland)	Josh Edwards	2 years	2023	
3 January 2022	DF	(Scotland)	Lewis Martin	6 months	2022	
4 January 2022	FW	(Northern Ireland)	Lewis McCann	2 years	2024	
13 January 2022	MF	(Scotland)	Paul Allan	2 years	2024	
18 January 2022	MF	(Scotland)	Matthew Todd	2 years	2024	
9 February 2022	DF	(Scotland)	Miller Fenton	2 years	2024	
