= 2022–23 Dunfermline Athletic F.C. season =

Dunfermline Athletic
2022–23 season
- Chairman: David Cook
- Manager: James McPake
- Stadium: East End Park; Dunfermline, Scotland (Capacity: 11,480)
- Scottish League One: Winners
- Scottish Cup: Fourth round
- League Cup: Group stage
- Challenge Cup: Quarter-final
- Top goalscorer: League: Craig Wighton (16); All: Craig Wighton (20)
- Highest home attendance: League: 9,530 vs. Falkirk (7 March 2023); Cup: 1,880 vs. Forfar Athletic (26 November 2022)
- Lowest home attendance: League: 3,639 vs. Alloa Athletic (30 July 2022); Cup: 1,530 vs. Buckie Thistle (12 July 2022)
- Average home league attendance: 4,776
Home colours	Away colours	Third colours
- All statistics correct as of 6 May 2023.

The 2022–23 season is Dunfermline Athletic's first season in Scottish League One, following their relegation from the Scottish Championship via the playoffs.

== Squad list ==
As of match played 6 May 2023

No.	Name	Nationality	Position	Date of birth (age)	Signed from	Signed in	Signed until	Apps.	Goals
Goalkeepers
1	Deniz Mehmet	(Turkey)	GK	19 September 1992 (age 33)	Dundee United	2021	2023	52	0
20	Max Little	(England)	GK	29 June 2002 (age 23)	Queen's Park Rangers	2022	2024	1	0
30	Calum Archibald	(Scotland)	GK	6 April 2005 (age 20)	Fife Elite Football Academy	2021	2024	0	0
Defenders
2	Aaron Comrie	(Scotland)	DF	3 February 1997 (age 28)	St Johnstone	2019	2023	133	4
3	Josh Edwards	(Scotland)	DF	27 May 2000 (age 25)	Airdrieonians	2019	2023	126	6
4	Kyle Benedictus	(Scotland)	DF	7 December 1991 (age 34)	Raith Rovers	2022	2024	43	7
6	Kyle MacDonald	(Scotland)	DF	11 January 2000 (age 26)	Airdrieonians	2021	2023	52	2
12	Rhys Breen	(Scotland)	DF	6 January 2000 (age 26)	Rangers	2021	2023	45	5
15	Sam Fisher	(Scotland)	DF	26 July 2001 (age 24)	Dundee (loan)	2022	2023	17	0
16	Ewan Otoo	(Scotland)	DF	30 August 2002 (age 23)	Celtic B (loan)	2023	2023	11	0
19	Miller Fenton	(Scotland)	DF	16 October 2003 (age 22)	Fife Elite Football Academy	2019	2024	4	0
21	Kane Ritchie-Hosler	(England)	DF	13 September 2002 (age 23)	Rangers	2022	2022	22	3
27	Sam Young	(Scotland)	DF	16 January 2006 (age 20)	Fife Elite Football Academy	2021	2024	1	0
Midfielders
5	Chris Hamilton	(Scotland)	MF	13 July 2001 (age 24)	Heart of Midlothian	2022	—	39	2
8	Joe Chalmers	(Scotland)	MF	3 January 1994 (age 32)	Ayr United	2022	2023	60	0
11	Chris Mochrie	(Scotland)	MF	7 April 2003 (age 22)	Dundee United (loan)	2022	2023	37	2
18	Paul Allan	(Scotland)	MF	7 February 2000 (age 25)	Fife Elite Football Academy	2017	2024	30	0
23	Paul McGowan	(Scotland)	MF	7 October 1987 (age 38)	Dundee (loan)	2023	2023	11	1
24	Jake Rennie	(Scotland)	MF	17 January 2005 (age 21)	Fife Elite Football Academy	2021	2024	1	0
25	Michael Beagley	(Scotland)	MF	2 February 2005 (age 20)	Fife Elite Football Academy	2021	2024	1	0
26	Matthew Todd	(Scotland)	MF	14 June 2001 (age 24)	Fife Elite Football Academy	2018	2024	77	13
28	Andrew Tod	(Scotland)	MF	26 February 2006 (age 19)	Fife Elite Football Academy	2021	2024	5	0
Forwards
7	Kevin O'Hara	(Scotland)	FW	11 August 1998 (age 27)	Alloa Athletic	2020	2023	94	25
9	Craig Wighton	(Scotland)	FW	27 July 1997 (age 28)	Heart of Midlothian	2021	2023	69	28
10	Nikolay Todorov	(Bulgaria)	FW	24 August 1996 (age 29)	Inverness CT	2021	2023	64	18
14	Lewis McCann	(Northern Ireland)	FW	7 June 2001 (age 24)	Fife Elite Football Academy	2018	2024	89	14
29	Taylor Sutherland	(Scotland)	FW	12 December 2005 (age 20)	—	2022	2024	3	1
30	Robbie Mahon	(Republic of Ireland)	FW	6 June 2003 (age 22)	Motherwell	2022	2023	12	0

== Results & fixtures ==
Win Draw Loss Postponed

=== Pre-season ===
25 June 2022 Friendly	Cove Rangers	0 – 2	Dunfermline Athletic	Cove Bay, Scotland
13:00		Report	McCann 32'; O'Hara 80'	Stadium: Balmoral Stadium; Attendance: 464; Referee: Mike Roncone
Note: Stuart McKenzie Testimonial

28 June 2022 Friendly	Forfar Athletic	0 – 6	Dunfermline Athletic	Forfar, Scotland
19:30			O'Hara 16', 57'; McCann 26'; Todd 40'; Fenton 76'; Todorov 86'	Stadium: Station Park; Referee: Greg Soutar

5 July 2022 Friendly	Dunfermline Athletic	0 – 1	Kilmarnock	Dunfermline, Scotland
19:30		Report	Armstrong 24'	Stadium: East End Park; Attendance: 1,244; Referee: Gavin Duncan

=== Scottish League One ===
30 July 2022 1	Dunfermline Athletic	1 – 0	Alloa Athletic	Dunfermline, Scotland
15:00	Todd 74'	BBC Sport report		Stadium: East End Park; Attendance: 3,639; Referee: Aitken

6 August 2022 2	Edinburgh	0 – 3	Dunfermline Athletic	Edinburgh, Scotland
15:00	Brydon (red card) 28'	BBC Sport report	McCann 14', 41'; Mochrie 72'	Stadium: Meadowbank Stadium; Attendance: 1,234; Referee: Cook

13 August 2022 3	Dunfermline Athletic	1 – 0	Montrose	Dunfermline, Scotland
15:00	Todorov 78'	BBC Sport report		Stadium: East End Park; Attendance: 3,720; Referee: Hardie

20 August 2022 4	Kelty Hearts	0 – 0	Dunfermline Athletic	Kelty, Scotland
15:00		BBC Sport report		Stadium: New Central Park; Attendance: 2,161; Referee: Grainger

27 August 2022 5	Dunfermline Athletic	1 – 1	Airdrieonians	Dunfermline, Scotland
15:00	Todorov 68'	BBC Sport report	Frizzell 78'	Stadium: East End Park; Attendance: 4,399; Referee: Irvine

3 September 2022 6	Queen of the South	0 – 2	Dunfermline Athletic	Dumfries, Scotland
15:00		BBC Sport report	Todorov 19'; Breen 45+2'	Stadium: Palmerston Park; Attendance: 1,175; Referee: Luke

17 September 2022 7	Dunfermline Athletic	1 – 1	Falkirk	Dunfermline, Scotland
15:00	Benedictus 55' (pen.)	BBC Sport report	Morrison 30'	Stadium: East End Park; Attendance: 6,670; Referee: Graham

1 October 2022 8	Dunfermline Athletic	2 – 2	Peterhead	Dunfermline, Scotland
15:00	Breen 67'; Todorov 84'	BBC Sport report	Brown 87'; Hewitt 90+4'	Stadium: East End Park; Attendance: 3,644; Referee: Barry Cook

8 October 2022 9	Alloa Athletic	0 – 3	Dunfermline Athletic	Alloa, Scotland
15:00		BBC Sport report	Comrie 30'; Todd 45+2'; Wighton 79'	Stadium: Recreation Park; Attendance: 1,653; Referee: Alan Newlands

15 October 2022 10	Dunfermline Athletic	1 – 0	Edinburgh	Dunfermline, Scotland
15:00	Fontaine 89 o.g.'	BBC Sport report		Stadium: East End Park; Attendance: 3,952; Referee: Steven Kirkland

18 October 2022 11	Clyde	0 – 2	Dunfermline Athletic	Hamilton, Scotland
15:00		BBC Sport report	Wighton 15'; Todd 90+3'	Stadium: New Douglas Park; Attendance: 1,208; Referee: Chris Fordyce
Note: Match postponed as a mark of respect following the passing of Queen Elizabeth II

22 October 2022 12	Montrose	2 – 0	Dunfermline Athletic	Montrose, Scotland
15:00	Wright 63', 87'	BBC Sport report		Stadium: Links Park; Attendance: 1,260; Referee: Iain Snedden

29 October 2022 13	Dunfermline Athletic	2 – 1	Kelty Hearts	Dunfermline, Scotland
15:00	Todorov 22'; Wighton 55'	BBC Sport report	Lyon 30'	Stadium: East End Park; Attendance: 4,571; Referee: Calum Scott

5 November 2022 14	Falkirk	0 – 1	Dunfermline Athletic	Falkirk, Scotland
15:00		BBC Sport report	Wighton 60'	Stadium: Falkirk Stadium; Attendance: 7,279; Referee: Alan Newlands

12 November 2022 15	Dunfermline Athletic	2 – 2	Clyde	Dunfermline, Scotland
15:00	Benedictus 65 pen.', 88 pen.'	BBC Sport report	Allan 23', 33'	Stadium: East End Park; Attendance: 4,505; Referee: Alan Muir

19 November 2022 16	Peterhead	0 – 2	Dunfermline Athletic	Peterhead, Scotland
15:00		BBC Sport report	Todd 10'; Mochrie 18'	Stadium: Balmoor Stadium; Attendance: 793; Referee: Stewart Luke

3 December 2022 17	Dunfermline Athletic	1 – 1	Queen of the South	Dunfermline, Scotland
15:00	Todorov 67'	BBC Sport report	Paton 45'	Stadium: East End Park; Attendance: 3,927; Referee: Colin Steven

24 December 2022 18	Kelty Hearts	1 – 2	Dunfermline Athletic	Kelty, Scotland
14:00	Agyeman 60'	BBC Sport report	Martin 67 o.g.' McCann 86'	Stadium: New Central Park; Attendance: 2,155; Referee: Greg Aitken

7 January 2023 19	Edinburgh	0 – 1	Dunfermline Athletic	Edinburgh, Scotland
15:00		BBC Sport report	Wighton 20'	Stadium: Meadowbank Stadium; Attendance: 1,320; Referee: Stewart Luke

14 January 2023 20	Dunfermline Athletic	4 – 0	Peterhead	Dunfermline, Scotland
15:00	Wighton 17'; Todd 36'; Edwards 76'; O'Hara 89'	BBC Sport report		Stadium: East End Park; Attendance: 4,024; Referee: Chris Graham

28 January 2023 21	Clyde	1 – 1	Dunfermline Athletic	Hamilton, Scotland
15:00	Rennie 4'	BBC Sport report	Edwards 38'	Stadium: New Douglas Park; Attendance: 1,066; Referee: Barry Cook

4 February 2023 22	Dunfermline Athletic	2 – 0	Montrose	Dunfermline, Scotland
15:00	Breen 40'; Wighton 63'	BBC Sport report		Stadium: East End Park; Attendance: 3,957; Referee: Alan Muir

11 February 2023 23	Airdrieonians	3 – 4	Dunfermline Athletic	Airdrie, Scotland
15:00	McGill 29'; Gallagher 39'; Mahon 50 o.g.' Smith (red card) 60'	BBC Sport report	Benedictus 60 pen.' Todd 66', 82'; Todorov 86'	Stadium: Excelsior Stadium; Referee: Gavin Duncan

18 February 2023 24	Dunfermline Athletic	1 – 1	Airdrieonians	Dunfermline, Scotland
15:00	Todorov 72'	BBC Sport report	Stanway 38'; Rae (red card) 82'	Stadium: East End Park; Attendance: 4,468; Referee: Ross Hardie

25 February 2023 25	Queen of the South	0 – 2	Dunfermline Athletic	Dumfries, Scotland
15:00		BBC Sport report	Wighton 22'; Benedictus 47'	Stadium: Palmerston Park; Attendance: 1,298; Referee: Chris Fordyce

4 March 2023 26	Dunfermline Athletic	2 – 0	Alloa Athletic	Dunfermline, Scotland
15:00	Hamilton 41'; O'Hara 68'	BBC Sport report		Stadium: East End Park; Attendance: 4,196; Referee: Euan Anderson

7 March 2023 27	Dunfermline Athletic	2 – 0	Falkirk	Dunfermline, Scotland
19:45	Breen 67'; Todd 75'	BBC Sport report		Stadium: East End Park; Attendance: 9,530; Referee: Euan Anderson

18 March 2023 28	Dunfermline Athletic	0 – 0	Edinburgh	Dunfermline, Scotland
15:00		BBC Sport report		Stadium: East End Park; Attendance: 4,168; Referee: Peter Stuart

25 March 2023 29	Montrose	1 – 3	Dunfermline Athletic	Montrose, Scotland
15:00	Brown 65'	BBC Sport report	McCann 22'; Wighton 29', 55 pen.'	Stadium: Links Park; Attendance: 1,052; Referee: Stewart Luke

1 April 2023 30	Dunfermline Athletic	0 – 0	Kelty Hearts	Dunfermline, Scotland
15:00		BBC Sport report		Stadium: East End Park; Attendance: 4,702; Referee: Calum Scott

8 April 2023 31	Falkirk	2 – 2	Dunfermline Athletic	Falkirk, Scotland
15:00	Nesbitt 8'; Burrell 33'	BBC Sport report	Wighton 35'; McCann 44'	Stadium: Falkirk Stadium; Attendance: 6,301; Referee: David Dickinson

11 April 2023 32	Peterhead	0 – 2	Dunfermline Athletic	Peterhead, Scotland
19:45		BBC Sport report	Todorov 57'; Wighton 67'	Stadium: Balmoor Stadium; Attendance: 1,281; Referee: Dan McFarlane

15 April 2023 33	Dunfermline Athletic	5 – 0	Queen of the South	Dunfermline, Scotland
15:00	Ritchie-Hosler 22'; Todd 39'; Wighton 52', 64'; O'Hara 78'	BBC Sport report		Stadium: East End Park; Attendance: 5,892; Referee: Ross Hardie

22 April 2023 34	Airdrieonians	1 – 1	Dunfermline Athletic	Airdrie, Scotland
15:00	Gallagher 62'	BBC Sport report	Wighton 58'; Benedictus (red card) 64'; O'Hara (red card) 72'	Stadium: Excelsior Stadium; Attendance: 1,281; Referee: Greg Aitken

29 April 2023 35	Dunfermline Athletic	2 – 1	Clyde	Dunfermline, Scotland
15:00	Ritchie-Hosler 45'; McCann 90+3'	BBC Sport report	Salkeld 12'	Stadium: East End Park; Attendance: 6,005; Referee: Colin Steven

6 May 2023 36	Alloa Athletic	0 – 2	Dunfermline Athletic	Alloa, Scotland
15:00		BBC Sport report	Wighton 64'; McGowan 68'	Stadium: Recreation Park; Attendance: 1,608; Referee: Calum Scott

=== Scottish League Cup ===
==== Group stage ====
9 July 2022 1	East Fife	0 – 2	Dunfermline Athletic	Methil, Scotland
15:00		BBC Sport report	McCann 67', 83' (pen.)	Stadium: Bayview Stadium; Attendance: 963; Referee: Snedden

12 July 2022 2	Dunfermline Athletic	5 – 0	Buckie Thistle	Dunfermline, Scotland
19:45	Breen 20'; McCann 51'; Todorov 62', 78'; Edwards 82'	BBC Sport report		Stadium: East End Park; Attendance: 1,530; Referee: McFarlane

16 July 2022 3	Ross County	1 – 0	Dunfermline Athletic	Dingwall, Scotland
15:00	Hiwula 64'	BBC Sport report		Stadium: Victoria Park; Attendance: 943; Referee: Walsh

23 July 2022 4	Dunfermline Athletic	1 – 1 (4 – 5 p)	Alloa Athletic	Dunfermline, Scotland
15.00	Hamilton 20'	BBC Sport report	Sammon 59'	Stadium: East End Park; Attendance: 1,723; Referee: Lambie
	Penalties
	McCann (penalty scored); O'Hara (penalty scored); Todorov (penalty scored); Chalmers (penalty missed); Allan (penalty scored)		Taggart (penalty scored); Scougall (penalty scored); Sammon (penalty scored); King (penalty scored); MacIver (penalty scored)

=== Scottish Challenge Cup ===
15 November 2022 Third round	Dunfermline Athletic	2 – 1	Celtic B	Dunfermline, Scotland
17:45	Sutherland 3'; Todorov 25'	Report	Kenny 36'	Stadium: East End Park; Attendance: 1,287; Referee: Calum Scott

10 December 2022 Fourth round	Arbroath	1 – 5	Dunfermline Athletic	Arbroath, Scotland
15:00	O'Brien 74'	Report	MacDonald 6'; Todd 19', 36'; Benedictus 22'; Wighton 68'	Stadium: Gayfield Park; Attendance: 874; Referee: Chris Graham

24 January 2023 Quarter-final	Dundee	4 – 2	Dunfermline Athletic	Dundee
19:45	McMullan 29'; Robertson 59'; McCowan 83'; Anderson 90+1'	BBC Report	McCann 38'; Wighton 90+3'	Stadium: Dens Park; Attendance: 2,089; Referee: Craig Napier

=== Scottish Cup ===
26 November 2022 Third round	Dunfermline Athletic	4 – 0	Forfar Athletic	Dunfermline, Scotland
15:00	Wighton 27', 71'; Ritchie-Hosler 33'; Edwards 42'	BBC Sport report		Stadium: East End Park; Attendance: 1,880; Referee: Snedden

21 January 2023 Fourth round	Partick Thistle	1 – 1 (a.e.t.) (4 – 2 p)	Dunfermline Athletic	Glasgow, Scotland
15:00	Fitzpatrick 51'	Report	Benedictus 42 pen.'	Stadium: Firhill Stadium; Attendance: 3,218; Referee: Scott Lambie

== Squad statistics ==
=== Appearances and goals ===
As of match played 6 May 2023

No.	Pos	Nat	Player	Total		Scottish League One		League Cup		Scottish Challenge Cup		Scottish Cup	
No.	Pos	Nat	Player	Apps	Goals	Apps	Goals	Apps	Goals	Apps	Goals	Apps	Goals
1	GK	(Turkey) TUR	Deniz Mehmet	44	0	36	0	4	0	1	0	3	0
2	DF	(Scotland) SCO	Aaron Comrie	42	1	34+1	1	4	0	0	0	2+1	0
3	DF	(Scotland) SCO	Josh Edwards	44	4	35	2	4	1	1+1	0	3	1
4	DF	(Scotland) SCO	Kyle Benedictus	43	7	35	5	4	0	1	1	3	1
5	MF	(Scotland) SCO	Chris Hamilton	40	2	22+8	1	5	1	2	0	2+1	0
6	DF	(Scotland) SCO	Kyle MacDonald	35	1	14+13	0	1+2	0	2	1	2+1	0
7	FW	(Scotland) SCO	Kevin O'Hara	24	3	7+11	3	4	0	0	0	1+1	0
8	MF	(Scotland) SCO	Joe Chalmers	43	0	32+2	0	1+3	0	2	0	3	0
9	FW	(Scotland) SCO	Craig Wighton	42	20	28+6	16	3	0	1+1	1	2+1	3
10	FW	(Bulgaria) BUL	Nikolay Todorov	38	12	11+20	9	0+3	2	2	1	1+1	0
11	MF	(Scotland) SCO	Chris Mochrie	36	2	22+12	2	0	0	0	0	2	0
12	DF	(Scotland) SCO	Rhys Breen	34	5	24+1	4	4	1	2	0	3	0
14	FW	(Northern Ireland) NIR	Lewis McCann	35	10	16+13	6	4	3	0	0	1+1	1
15	DF	(Scotland) SCO	Sam Fisher	17	0	12+2	0	0	0	2	0	1	0
16	DF	(Scotland) SCO	Ewan Otoo	11	0	9+2	0	0	0	0	0	0	0
18	MF	(Scotland) SCO	Paul Allan	12	0	5+3	0	3+1	0	0	0	0	0
19	DF	(Scotland) SCO	Miller Fenton	3	0	0+2	0	0	0	0	0	0+1	0
20	GK	(England) ENG	Max Little	1	0	0	0	0	0	1	0	0	0
21	DF	(England) ENG	Kane Ritchie-Hosler	22	3	15+5	2	0	0	0	0	1+1	1
23	MF	(Scotland) SCO	Paul McGowan	11	1	3+8	1	0	0	0	0	0	0
24	MF	(Scotland) SCO	Jake Rennie	1	0	0	0	0+1	0	0	0	0	0
25	MF	(Scotland) SCO	Michael Beagley	1	0	0	0	0+1	0	0	0	0	0
26	MF	(Scotland) SCO	Matthew Todd	40	10	31	8	4	0	2	2	2+1	0
28	MF	(Scotland) SCO	Andrew Tod	5	0	0	0	0+2	0	1+1	0	0+1	0
29	FW	(Scotland) SCO	Taylor Sutherland	2	2	0	0	0	0	1	1+1	0+1	0
30	FW	(Republic of Ireland) IRL	Robbie Mahon	12	0	4+8	0	0	0	0	0	0	0
Players who left during the season:
17	MF	(Scotland) SCO	Graham Dorrans	0	0	0	0	0	0	0	0	0	0
27	MF	(Scotland) SCO	Sam Young	1	0	0	0	0	0	1	0	0	0

=== Goalscorers ===
As of match played 6 May 2023

Ranking	Position	Nation	Name	Total	Scottish League One	Scottish League Cup	Scottish Challenge Cup	Scottish Cup
1	FW	(Scotland)	Craig Wighton	20	16		2	2
2	FW	(Bulgaria)	Nikolay Todorov	12	9	2	1	
3	FW	(Northern Ireland)	Lewis McCann	10	6	3	1	
3	MF	(Scotland)	Matthew Todd	10	8		2	
4	DF	(Scotland)	Kyle Benedictus	7	5		1	1
5	DF	(Scotland)	Rhys Breen	5	4	1		
6	DF	(Scotland)	Josh Edwards	4	2	1		1
7	DF	(England)	Kane Ritchie-Hosler	3	2			1
8	MF	(Scotland)	Chris Hamilton	2	1	1		
8	MF	(Scotland)	Chris Mochrie	2	2			
8	FW	(Scotland)	Kevin O'Hara	2	1		1	
9	DF	(Scotland)	Aaron Comrie	1		1		
9	DF	(Scotland)	Kyle McDonald	1			1	
9	MF	(Scotland)	McGowan	1	1			
9	FW	(Scotland)	Taylor Sutherland	1			1	
Total				82	61	8	9	5

=== Disciplinary record ===
As of match played 6 May 2023

Squad number	Position	Nation	Name	Total		Scottish League One		Scottish League Cup		Scottish Challenge Cup		Scottish Cup	
Squad number	Position	Nation	Name	Booked	Sent off (straight red)	Booked	Sent off (straight red)	Booked	Sent off (straight red)	Booked	Sent off (straight red)	Booked	Sent off (straight red)
1	GK	(Turkey)	Deniz Mehmet	1		1							
2	DF	(Scotland)	Aaron Comrie	3		3							
3	DF	(Scotland)	Josh Edwards	9		6				1		2	
4	DF	(Scotland)	Kyle Benedictus	7	1	6	1	1					
5	MF	(Scotland)	Chris Hamilton	11		8		1		1			
6	MF	(Scotland)	Kyle MacDonald	1						1			
7	FW	(Scotland)	Kevin O'Hara	1	1		1			1			
8	MF	(Scotland)	Joe Chalmers	2		2							
9	FW	(Scotland)	Craig Wighton	4		2							
10	FW	(Bulgaria)	Nikolay Todorov	3		2							
11	MF	(Scotland)	Chris Mochrie	1		1							
12	DF	(Scotland)	Rhys Breen	1		1							
14	FW	(Northern Ireland)	Lewis McCann	5		5							
15	DF	(Scotland)	Sam Fisher	5		3		1		1			
18	MF	(Scotland)	Paul Allan	3		2		1					
21	DF	(England)	Kane Ritchie-Hosler	2		2							
23	MF	(Scotland)	Paul McGowan	2		2							
26	MF	(Scotland)	Matthew Todd	5		5							
Total				67	2	56	2	4	0	5	0	2	0

== Club statistics ==
=== League table ===
Pos	Team	Pld	W	D	L	GF	GA	GD	Pts	Promotion, qualification or relegation
1	Dunfermline Athletic (C, P)	36	23	12	1	63	21	+42	81	Promotion to the Championship
2	Falkirk	36	19	10	7	70	39	+31	67	Qualification for the Championship play-offs
3	Airdrieonians (O, P)	36	17	9	10	82	51	+31	60	Qualification for the Championship play-offs
4	Alloa Athletic	36	17	6	13	56	47	+9	57	Qualification for the Championship play-offs
5	Queen of the South	36	16	6	14	59	59	0	54	

Rules for classification: 1) Points; 2) Goal difference; 3) Goals scored; 4) Head-to-to head points; 5) Head-to-head goal difference; 6) Play-off (only for deciding promotion, play-off participation and relegation).
(C) Champions; (O) Play-off winners; (P) Promoted

=== League cup table ===
Pos	Team	Pld	W	PW	PL	L	GF	GA	GD	Pts	Qualification	ROS	DNF	ALL	EFI	BUC
1	Ross County	4	3	1	0	0	11	1	+10	11	Qualification for the second round	—	1–0	—	7–0	—
2	Dunfermline Athletic	4	2	0	1	1	8	2	+6	7		—	—	1–1p	—	5–0
3	Alloa Athletic	4	1	2	0	1	6	5	+1	7		0–2	—	—	p1–1	—
4	East Fife	4	1	0	1	2	4	12	−8	4		—	0–2	—	—	3–2
5	Buckie Thistle	4	0	0	1	3	4	13	−9	1		1–1p	—	1–4	—	—

Rules for classification: 1) goal difference, 2) goals scored, 3) away goals scored, 4) matches won, 5) away matches won, 6) drawing of lots.

== Transfers ==
=== First team ===
==== Players in ====
Date	Position	No.	Nationality	Name	From	Fee	Ref.
6 June 2022	DF	4	(Scotland)	Kyle Benedictus	Raith Rovers	Free	
8 June 2022	MF	5	(Scotland)	Chris Hamilton	Heart of Midlothian	Free	
22 July 2022	GK	20	(England)	Max Little	Queens Park Rangers	Free	

==== Players out ====
Date	Position	No.	Nationality	Name	To	Fee	Ref.
31 May 2022	DF	4	(Scotland)	Lewis Martin	Kelty Hearts	Free	
31 May 2022	MF	11	(Scotland)	Ryan Dow	Peterhead	Free	
31 May 2022	MF	16	(England)	Dan Pybus	York City	Free	
31 May 2022	MF	21	(Scotland)	Steven Lawless	Partick Thistle	Free	
31 May 2022	DF	22	(Scotland)	Leon Jones	Eastern Sports Club	Free	
31 May 2022	MF	23	(Scotland)	Dom Thomas	Queen's Park	Free	
31 May 2022	MF	28	(England)	Reece Cole	Chertsey Town	Free	
2 September 2022	MF	17	(Scotland)	Graham Dorrans	Free agent	Released	

==== Loans in ====
Date	Position	No.	Nationality	Name	From	Duration	Ref.
5 August 2022	MF	11	(Scotland)	Chris Mochrie	Dundee United	End of Season	
16 August 2022	DF	15	(Scotland)	Sam Fisher	Dundee	End of Season	
30 September 2022	DF	21	(England)	Kane Ritchie-Hosler	Rangers	1 January 2023	
30 September 2022	FW	30	(Republic of Ireland)	Robbie Mahon	Motherwell	End of Season	
10 February 2023	DF	16	(Scotland)	Ewan Otoo	Celtic B	End of Season	
21 February 2023	MF	23	(Scotland)	Paul McGowan	Dundee	End of Season	

==== Loans out ====
Date	Position	No.	Nationality	Name	To	Duration	Ref.
5 August 2022	DF	19	(Scotland)	Miller Fenton	Berwick Rangers	January 2023	
23 February 2023	DF	27	(Scotland)	Sam Young	Cowdenbeath	End of Season	
