= Rhys Breen =

Scottish footballer (born 2000)

Personal information
- Date of birth: 6 January 2000 (age 26)
- Place of birth: Bellshill, Scotland
- Height: 1.91 m (6 ft 3 in)
- Position: Defender

Team information
- Current team: East Kilbride
- Number: 20

Youth career
- Coltswood Colts
- Rangers

Senior career*
Years	Team	Apps	(Gls)
2020–2021	Rangers	0	(0)
2020–2021	→ Partick Thistle (loan)	4	(0)
2021	→ Queen of the South (loan)	15	(1)
2021	→ Orange County SC (loan)	5	(0)
2021–2025	Dunfermline Athletic	47	(4)
2024–2025	→ Annan Athletic (loan)	17	(2)
2025–	East Kilbride	31	(2)
- * Club domestic league appearances and goals as of 4 May 2026

Rhys Breen (born 6 January 2000) is a Scottish footballer who plays as a defender for East Kilbride. Breen began his career with Rangers, and has also had loan spells with Partick Thistle, Queen of the South and Orange County SC. Breen joined Dunfermline Athletic in July 2021.

== Career ==
In November 2019, Breen, a product of the Rangers youth system, signed a new contract with the club extending his stay until the summer of 2021. On 27 August 2020, Breen joined Scottish League One club Partick Thistle on loan until the end of the season.

Breen was recalled from Thistle at the beginning of 2021 and on 7 January 2021, joined Scottish Championship side Queen of the South on loan for the remainder of the season. Breen made his debut for the club in a win against Greenock Morton.

Breen moved on loan to Rangers' USL Championship affiliate club Orange County SC on 14 May 2021. After 3 months in America, Breen returned home to Scotland to sign a two-year contract with Scottish Championship club Dunfermline Athletic.

== Career stats ==
Games as of 08 May 2023

Appearances and goals by club, season and competition
Club	Season	League			Scottish Cup		League Cup		Other		Total	
Club	Season	Division	Apps	Goals	Apps	Goals	Apps	Goals	Apps	Goals	Apps	Goals
Rangers	2020–21	Scottish Premiership	0	0	0	0	0	0	0	0	0	0
Rangers	Total		0	0	0	0	0	0	0	0	0	0
Partick Thistle (loan)	2020–21	Scottish Championship	4	0	0	0	2	0	0	0	6	0
Queen of the South (loan)	2020–21	Scottish Championship	15	0	1	0	0	0	0	0	16	0
Orange County SC (loan)	2021	USL Championship	5	0	0	0	0	0	0	0	5	0
Dunfermline Athletic	2021–22	Scottish Championship	11	0	0	0	0	0	0	0	11	0
Dunfermline Athletic	2022–23	Scottish League One	25	4	3	0	4	1	2	0	34	5
Dunfermline Athletic	Dunfermline Total		36	4	3	0	4	1	2	0	45	5
Career total			60	4	4	0	6	1	2	0	72	5

== Honours ==
Dunfermline Athletic

- Scottish League One: 2022–23
