= Lewis McCann =

Footballer (born 2001)

Personal information
- Full name: Lewis Andrew McCann
- Date of birth: 7 June 2001 (age 25)
- Place of birth: Edinburgh, Scotland
- Height: 6 ft 4 in (1.93 m)
- Position: Striker

Team information
- Current team: Fleetwood Town
- Number: 14

Youth career
- 2006–2015: Lothian Thistle Hutchison Vale
- 2015–2016: Heart of Midlothian
- 2016–2018: Fife Elite Football Academy

Senior career*
Years	Team	Apps	(Gls)
2018–2025	Dunfermline Athletic	143	(17)
2025–	Fleetwood Town	15	(1)

International career^{‡}
2018–2019	Northern Ireland U19	5	(0)
2019–2021	Northern Ireland U21	6	(0)
- * Club domestic league appearances and goals as of 14:58, 15 April 2025 (UTC) ‡ National team caps and goals as of 15:20, 31 May 2021 (UTC)

Lewis Andrew McCann (born 7 June 2001) is a professional footballer who plays as striker for EFL League Two club Fleetwood Town. Born in Scotland, he has represented Northern Ireland at youth international level.

== Early and personal life ==
McCann and his brothers, Ali (also a footballer) and Ross (Scotland rugby 7s player), were born in Scotland to a Northern Irish father and an English mother. He attended Royal High School in Edinburgh.

== Club career ==
Born in Edinburgh, McCann played youth football with Lothian Thistle Hutchison Vale, Heart of Midlothian and Fife Elite Football Academy, before signing his first professional contract with Dunfermline Athletic in May 2018. His first appearance for the side came in July 2018 as a second-half substitute in a Scottish League Cup game against Peterhead. In January 2022, McCann signed a contract extension until May 2024. On 26 August 2025, McCann joined League Two side Fleetwood Town on a two-year deal.

== International career ==
McCann said of his international eligibility, "Northern Ireland were the first country that came to me. I don't really have a preference what country I play for. My dad's from Northern Ireland, my mum's from London and I was born here in Scotland."

McCann has represented Northern Ireland at under-19 level.

== Career statistics ==
As of 9 February 2025

Appearances and goals by club, season and competition
Club	Season	League			FA Cup		League Cup		Other		Total			
Club	Season	Division	Apps	Goals	Apps	Goals	Apps	Goals	Apps	Goals	Apps	Goals		
Dunfermline Athletic	2018–19	Scottish Championship	6	0	0	0	1	0	1 (Note: Appearances in the Scottish Challenge Cup)	0	8	0		
Dunfermline Athletic	2019–20	Scottish Championship	14	0	1	0	4	0	0	0	19	0		
Dunfermline Athletic	2020–21	Scottish Championship	11	0	1	0	4	0	0	0	16	0		
Dunfermline Athletic	2021–22	Scottish Championship	22	4	1	0	0	0	2 (Note: Appearances in the Scottish Championship play-offs)	0	25	4		
Dunfermline Athletic	2022–23	Scottish League One	29	6	1	0	4	3	1	1	35	10		
Dunfermline Athletic	2023–24	Scottish Championship	31	4	1	0	4	3	1	0	37	7		
Dunfermline Athletic	2024–25	Scottish Championship	20	3	2	1	4	1	3	2	29	7		
Fleetwood Town	2025–26	League Two	15	1	3	0	4	0	—		—		0	0
Career total			133	17	7	1	21	7	8	3	169	28		

== Honours ==
Dunfermline Athletic

- Scottish League One: 2022–23
