= Josh Edwards (footballer, born 2000) =

Scottish footballer (born 2000)

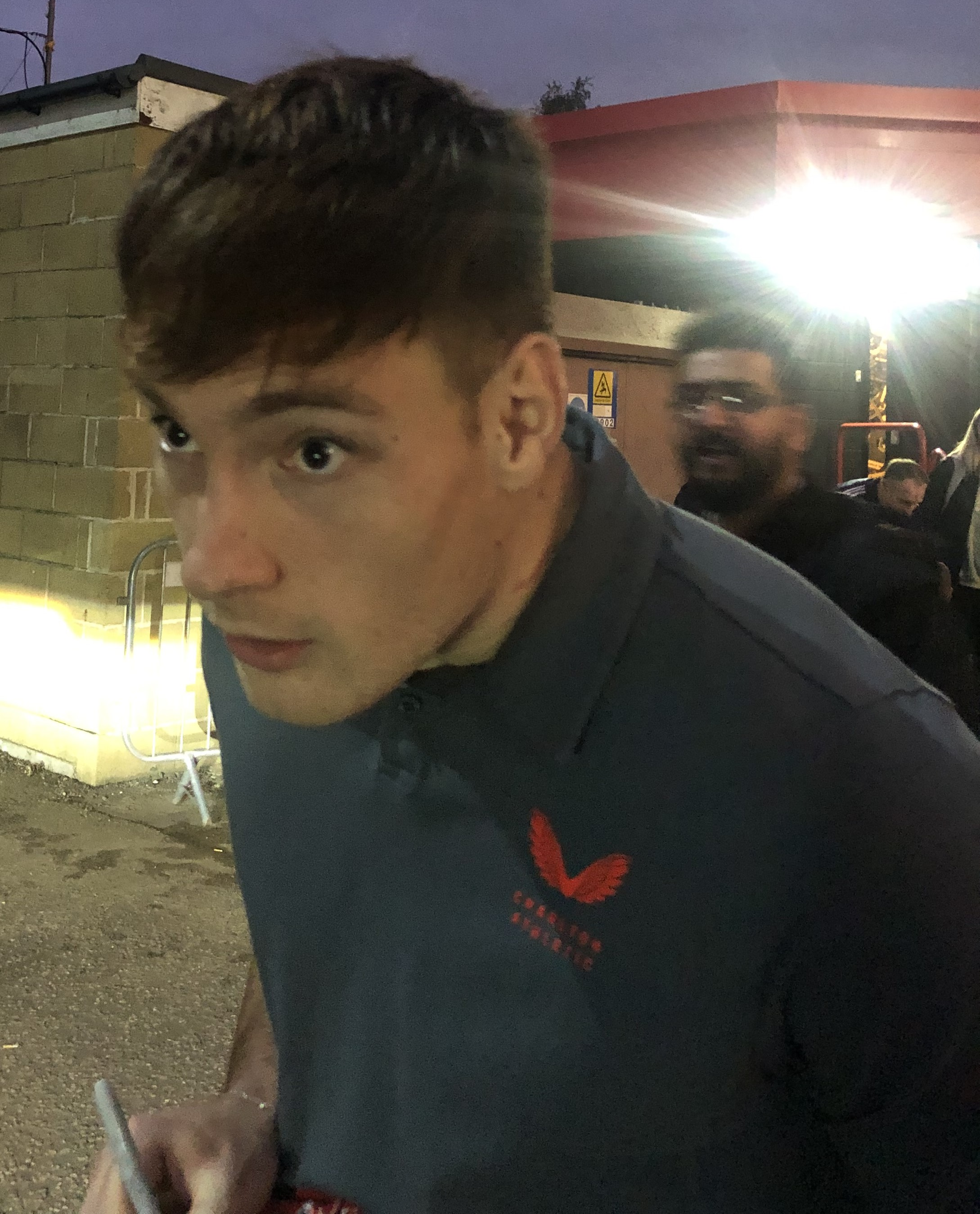
- Edwards in 2024

Personal information
- Full name: Joshua John Edwards
- Date of birth: 27 May 2000 (age 26)
- Place of birth: Kilmarnock, Scotland
- Height: 1.83 m (6 ft 0 in)
- Position: Defender

Team information
- Current team: Charlton Athletic
- Number: 3

Youth career
- Kilmarnock
- Ayr United
- –2017: Crosshouse Community

Senior career*
Years	Team	Apps	(Gls)
2017–2019	Airdrieonians	34	(0)
2019–2024	Dunfermline Athletic	147	(7)
2024–	Charlton Athletic	48	(1)
- * Club domestic league appearances and goals as of 17:10, 24 October 2026 (UTC)

Joshua John Edwards (born 27 May 2000) is a Scottish footballer who plays as a defender for EFL Championship club Charlton Athletic. Edwards began his career with Airdrieonians and has also played for Dunfermline Athletic.

== Career ==
=== Airdrieonians ===
Edwards started his career with Kilmarnock, Ayr United and Ayrshire boys' club Crosshouse Community, before joining Scottish League One side Airdrieonians in 2017. He made his first-team debut in a league victory over Forfar Athletic in December 2017.

=== Dunfermline Athletic ===
After attracting interest from a number of clubs, Edwards signed a two-year deal with Scottish Championship side Dunfermline Athletic for an undisclosed fee on 16 July 2019. The following day, Edwards made his first appearance for Dunfermline, coming on as a second-half substitute in a Scottish League Cup match against Albion Rovers.

=== Charlton Athletic ===
On 19 June 2024, it was confirmed that Edwards had joined League One side Charlton Athletic on a four-year deal for an undisclosed fee. The Addicks fought off competition from fellow League One sides Barnsley and Bristol Rovers in order to secure Edwards' signature.

== Career statistics ==
As of 24 October 2026

Appearances and goals by club, season and competition
Club	Season	League			National cup (Note: Includes Scottish Cup, FA Cup)		League cup (Note: Includes EFL Cup)		Other		Total	
Club	Season	Division	Apps	Goals	Apps	Goals	Apps	Goals	Apps	Goals	Apps	Goals
Airdrieonians	2017–18	Scottish League One	12	0	0	0	0	0	0	0	12	0
Airdrieonians	2018–19	Scottish League One	22	0	1	0	4	0	0	0	27	0
Airdrieonians	Airdrieonians total		34	0	1	0	4	0	0	0	39	0
Dunfermline Athletic	2019–20	Scottish Championship	15	0	1	0	2	0	1 (Note: Appearances in the Scottish Challenge Cup)	0	19	0
Dunfermline Athletic	2020–21	Scottish Championship	25	0	1	0	6	0	2 (Note: Appearances in the Scottish Premiership Playoffs)	0	34	0
Dunfermline Athletic	2021–22	Scottish Championship	36	2	1	0	5	0	1 (Note: Appearances in the Scottish League One Playoffs)	0	43	2
Dunfermline Athletic	2022–23	Scottish League One	35	2	2	1	4	1	3	0	44	4
Dunfermline Athletic	2023–24	Scottish Championship	36	3	1	0	4	1	1	0	42	4
Dunfermline Athletic	Dunfermline Athletic total		147	7	6	1	21	2	8	0	182	10
Charlton Athletic	2024–25	League One	38	1	3	0	0	0	5 (Note: Two appearances in the EFL Trophy and three appearances in the League One play-offs)	0	46	1
Charlton Athletic	2025–26	Championship	7	0	0	0	0	0	—		7	0
Charlton Athletic	2026–27	Championship	3	0	0	0	0	0	—		3	0
Charlton Athletic	Charlton Athletic total		48	1	3	0	0	0	5	0	56	1
Career total			229	8	10	1	25	2	13	0	277	11

== Honours ==
Dunfermline Athletic

- Scottish League One: 2022–23

Charlton Athletic

- EFL League One play-offs: 2025

Individual

- PFA Scotland Team of the Year (Scottish League One): 2022–23
