= Nikolay Todorov (footballer, born 1996) =

Bulgarian footballer

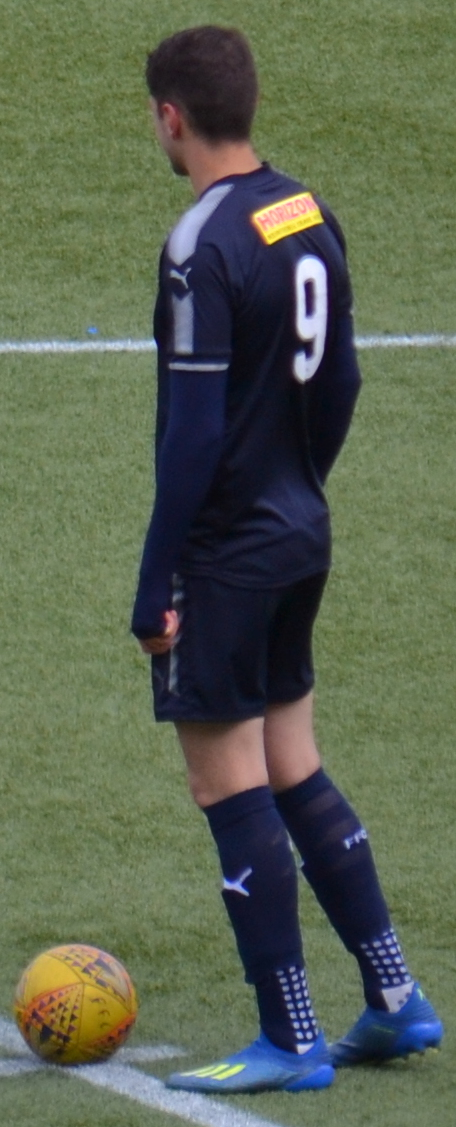

Personal information
- Full name: Nikolay Nikolaev Todorov
- Date of birth: 24 August 1996 (age 30)
- Place of birth: Pleven, Bulgaria
- Height: 1.90 m (6 ft 3 in)
- Position: Centre-forward

Team information
- Current team: Queens Park
- Number: 77

Youth career
- 2003–2011: FC Pleven
- 2011–2013: Brooke House College
- 2014–2015: Nottingham Forest

Senior career*
Years	Team	Apps	(Gls)
2015–2016	Nottingham Forest	0	(0)
2015	→ Worcester City (loan)	2	(0)
2016	→ Hemel Hempstead (loan)	9	(2)
2016–2018	Heart of Midlothian	0	(0)
2016–2017	→ Cowdenbeath (loan)	19	(6)
2017–2018	→ Livingston (loan)	32	(12)
2018	→ Queen of the South (loan)	8	(1)
2018–2019	Rieti	18	(6)
2019	Falkirk	7	(0)
2019–2021	Inverness Caledonian Thistle	48	(18)
2021–2023	Dunfermline Athletic	47	(17)
2023–2024	Airdrieonians	48	(12)
2024–2025	Hamilton Academical	32	(1)
2025–2026	Arbroath	11	(4)
2026–	Queens Park	9	(1)

International career
2017	Bulgaria U21	2	(0)
- * Club domestic league appearances and goals as of 4 May 2026

Nikolay Todorov (Bulgarian: Николай Тодоров; born 24 August 1996) is a Bulgarian footballer who plays as a forward for Queen's Park football club .

Todorov was a Bulgaria U21 international. Known for his physical presence, At the age of 7, Todorov started his career with Spartak Pleven's youth system before winning a scholarship in England. In 2014, he joined Nottingham Forest in their Under-21s academy, loan spells followed at Hemel Hempstead and Worcester City in England.

Todorov joined Heart of Midlothian in 2016, loan spells followed at Cowdenbeath and Livingston where he was part of the 2017–18 promotion winning team finishing as champions. He spent the first half of the 2017–18 season back on loan at Livingston, before spending the second half of the season at Queen of the South. He subsequently had a short spell in Italy with Rieti, before returning to Scotland with Falkirk and then Inverness Caledonian Thistle. Todorov signed for Dunfermline in June 2021, winning the League One title in 2023. Todorov left Dunfermline at the end of his contract. He then joined Airdrieonians for a season, with whom he won the Scottish Challenge Cup.

== Career ==
Born in Pleven, Todorov joined FC Pleven's Academy at seven years old. In 2011, he joined Brooke House College and played three years for the college's football team, Brooke House College Football Academy under manager Ben Watts.

In 2014, Todorov joined Nottingham Forest at Under-21 level. On 10 January 2015, he signed his second professional contract with the club. Although he played for the Under-21s, he failed to feature for the first team and was officially released in May 2016.

Todorov had already joined up with Scottish Premiership club Heart of Midlothian in April 2016, to try earn himself a contract. After a successful two-month trial period, he then signed a one-year contract in June 2016. In July 2016, Todorov had a six-month loan spell at Scottish League Two club Cowdenbeath. He made his debut on the opening day of the 2016–17 season in a 1–0 home defeat to Elgin City on 6 August 2016. The following week, Todorov scored his first ever league goal in a 4–3 away loss at Forfar Athletic, with a header from a cross six yards out in the 59th minute. Todorov was mainly played as a centre back due to an injury crisis, before being recalled by Hearts in January 2017. Todorov then went on loan to Livingston in January 2017, helping Livingston win the 2016–17 Scottish League One title. He signed a new one-year contract with Hearts at the end of the 2016–17 season. Todorov spent the first half of the 2017–18 season back on loan at Livingston.

On 31 January 2018, Todorov joined Queen of the South on loan for the remainder of the 2017–18 season.

On 14 August 2018, Todorov signed a two-year contract with Italian Serie C club Rieti. He then returned to Scottish football in January 2019, signing for Falkirk. Following Falkirk's relegation to League One, he left and signed for Inverness Caledonian Thistle.

Todorov spent two seasons with Dunfermline before signing for Airdrieonians in June 2023, where he scored the winner in a 3–2 win against his former club, Inverness. Todorov enjoyed a successful season with the Diamonds, scoring the winning penalty in the 2024 Scottish Challenge Cup final and helped the club reach the Premiership play-offs as the club's top scorer.

In July 2024, Todorov joined Airdrie's Lanarkshire rivals and fellow Scottish Championship club Hamilton Academical on a two-year deal.

== International career ==
Todorov has represented Bulgaria on U15, U16 and U21 level. On 30 May 2017, he received his first call-up for Bulgaria U21 for the friendly matches against Georgia U21 and Greece U21 on 8 and 12 June 2017.

== Style of play ==
Todorov primarily plays as a centre forward, but he can also be deployed as a centre back. A two‑footed player, he is capable of scoring with either foot and is noted for his strength, physical presence, and aerial ability.

== Personal life ==
His father is also called Nikolay Todorov (born 1964), who was also a professional footballer and playing for the national team of Bulgaria.

On 1 February 2019 he married his Scottish girlfriend Jennifer Clark in a small ceremony.

== Career statistics ==
As of 5 April 2025

Appearances and goals by club, season and competition
Club	Season	League			National cup (Note: Includes Scottish Cup)		League cup (Note: Includes Scottish League Cup)		Other		Total	
Club	Season	Division	Apps	Goals	Apps	Goals	Apps	Goals	Apps	Goals	Apps	Goals
Nottingham Forest	2015–16	EFL Championship	0	0	0	0	0	0	—		0	0
Nottingham Forest	Total		0	0	0	0	0	0	0	0	0	0
Worcester City (loan)	2015–16	National League North	2	0	0	0	—		—		2	0
Hemel Hempstead (loan)	2015–16	National League South	9	0	0	0	—		—		9	0
Heart of Midlothian	2016–17	Scottish Premiership	0	0	0	0	0	0	—		0	0
Heart of Midlothian	2017–18	Scottish Premiership	0	0	0	0	0	0	—		0	0
Heart of Midlothian	Total		0	0	0	0	0	0	0	0	0	0
Cowdenbeath (loan)	2016–17	Scottish League Two	19	3	1	0	1	1	1 (Note: Appearances in the Scottish Challenge Cup)	1	22	5
Livingston (loan)	2016–17	Scottish League One	14	4	—		—		—		14	4
Livingston (loan)	2017–18	Scottish Championship	18	2	0	0	4	1	2	1	24	4
Queen of the South (loan)	2017–18	Scottish Championship	8	1	0	0	0	0	0	0	8	1
Rieti	2018–19	Serie C	18	2	0	0	0	0	0	0	18	2
Falkirk	2018–19	Scottish Championship	7	0	0	0	0	0	0	0	7	0
Inverness Caledonian Thistle	2019–20	Scottish Championship	22	3	2	1	4	2	3	1	31	7
Inverness Caledonian Thistle	2020–21	Scottish Championship	26	9	2	2	4	0	0	0	32	11
Inverness Caledonian Thistle	Total		48	12	4	3	8	2	3	1	63	18
Dunfermline Athletic	2021–22	Scottish Championship	16	2	1	0	5	3	0	0	22	5
Dunfermline Athletic	2022-23	Scottish League One	31	9	1	0	3	2	3	0	38	11
Dunfermline Athletic	Total		47	11	2	0	8	5	3	0	60	16
Airdrieonians	2023-24	Scottish Championship	32	6	3	1	5	2	7 (Note: Includes five appearances and two goals in the Scottish Challenge Cup and two appearances and one goal in the 2024 Scottish Premiership play-offs)	3	47	12
Hamilton Academical	2024-25	Scottish Championship	28	0	1	0	3	0	2	0	34	0
Career total			250	41	11	4	29	11	18	6	308	62

== Honours ==
=== Club ===
Livingston

- Scottish League One: 2016–17

Inverness Caledonian Thisle

- Scottish Challenge Cup: 2019-20

Dunfermline Athletic

- Scottish League One: 2022–23

Airdrieonians

- Scottish Challenge Cup: 2023–24

=== Individual ===
- PFA Scotland Team of the Year: 2020–21 Scottish Championship
