= Matthew Todd (footballer) =

Scottish footballer

Personal information
- Date of birth: 14 June 2001 (age 25)
- Place of birth: Dunfermline, Scotland
- Position: Midfielder

Team information
- Current team: St Johnstone

Youth career
- 2018–2020: Dunfermline Athletic

Senior career*
Years	Team	Apps	(Gls)
2019–2020	Dunfermline Athletic	17	(0)
2020–2021	→ Brechin City (loan)	9	(1)
2021–2026	Dunfermline Athletic	119	(21)
2026–	St Johnstone	0	(0)
- * Club domestic league appearances and goals as of 17:10, 17 June 2026 (UTC)

Matthew Todd (born 14 June 2001), commonly known as Matty Todd, is a Scottish professional footballer who plays as a Midfielder for Scottish Premiership club St Johnstone.

== Career ==
Todd was one of six players to join Dunfermline Athletic in May 2018 after graduating from Fife Elite Football Academy. He had previously taken part in a number of Dunfermline matches, and scored in a Fife Cup match against Burntisland Shipyard, which was abandoned after 50 minutes due to a serious injury to Pars player Aaron Splaine.

Todd made his first appearance after signing with the club in a Scottish Challenge Cup victory over Inverness Caledonian Thistle, playing the full 90 minutes. His first league appearance came in a 3–0 win over Partick Thistle, where he replaced Kallum Higginbotham in the final minutes of the match.

In September 2020, Todd moved on season-long loan to Scottish League Two side Brechin City. Following the postponement of football in the Scottish lower leagues in January 2021, Todd was recalled by his parent club.

Following Dunfermline's relegation to League One, Todd became a first team regular making 40 appearances and scoring 10 goals in the 2022-23 Season. Todd won numerous end of season awards including Goal of the Season and Young Player of the Season, as well as being inducted in to the PFA Scotland Team of the Year.

In June 2026, Todd moved to St Johnstone on a two year contract until summer 2028.

== Career statistics ==
As of 19 August 2025

Appearances and goals by club, season and competition
Club	Season	League			FA Cup		League Cup		Other		Total	
Club	Season	Division	Apps	Goals	Apps	Goals	Apps	Goals	Apps	Goals	Apps	Goals
Dunfermline Athletic	2018–19	Scottish Championship	8	0	1	0	0	0	1 (Note: Appearances in the Scottish Challenge Cup)	0	10	0
Dunfermline Athletic	2019–20	Scottish Championship	5	0	0	0	1	0	1	0	7	0
Dunfermline Athletic	2020–21	Scottish Championship	1	0	1	0	0	0	0	0	2	0
Dunfermline Athletic	2021–22	Scottish Championship	22	1	1	0	2	0	0	0	25	1
Dunfermline Athletic	2022–23	Scottish League One	31	9	3	0	4	0	2	2	40	11
Dunfermline Athletic	2023–24	Scottish Championship	18	4	1	0	2	0	0	0	21	4
Dunfermline Athletic	2024–25	Scottish Championship	24	3	1	1	0	0	2	1	27	5
Dunfermline Athletic	2025–26	Scottish Championship	2	0	0	0	2	0	0	0	4	0
Dunfermline Athletic	Dunfermline Total		111	17	8	1	11	0	6	3	136	21
Brechin City (Loan)	2020–21	Scottish League Two	9	1	0	0	4	0	0	0	13	1
St Johnstone	2026–27	Scottish Premiership	0	0	0	0	0	0	0	0	0	0
Career total			120	18	8	1	15	0	6	3	149	22

== Honours ==
Team

Dunfermline Athletic

- Scottish League One: 2022–23

Individual

- PFA Scotland Team of the Year (Scottish League One): 2022–23
