= 2019–20 Dunfermline Athletic F.C. season =

Dunfermline Athletic
2019–20 season
- Chairman: Ross McArthur
- Manager: Stevie Crawford
- Stadium: East End Park; Dunfermline, Scotland (Capacity: 11,480)
- Championship: Fifth
- Challenge Cup: Third round, lost to Alloa Athletic
- League Cup: Second round, lost to Celtic
- Scottish Cup: Third round, lost to Stranraer
- Top goalscorer: League: Kevin Nisbet (18); All: Kevin Nisbet (23)
- Highest home attendance: League: 6,480 vs. Dundee United (24 August 2019); Cup: 1,693 vs. Albion Rovers (17 July 2019)
- Lowest home attendance: League: 3,397 vs. Inverness CT (25 February 2020); Cup: 1,448 vs. Alloa Athletic (7 September 2019)
- Average home league attendance: 4,151(864)
- Biggest win: League: Dunfermline Athletic 5–1 Partick Thistle (30 November 2019); Cup: Dunfermline Athletic 6–0 Albion Rovers (17 July 2019)
- Biggest defeat: League: Four matches by 2 goals Cup: Celtic 2–1 Dunfermline Athletic (17 August 2019); Dunfermline Athletic 1–2 Alloa Athletic (7 September 2019)
Home colours	Away colours
- All statistics correct as of 15 April 2020.

The 2019–20 season was Dunfermline Athletic's fourth season in the Scottish Championship, having finished 7th in the 2018–19 season.

On 13 March 2020 all SPFL leagues were indefinitely suspended due to the COVID-19 coronavirus outbreak. On 8 April, with the pandemic continuing, the SPFL board proposed to curtail the 2019–20 Championship season and use the points per game earned by each team to date as the final standings. The plan was approved on 15 April, meaning the league was declared over.

== Squad list ==
As of 11 March 2020, the final match of the season

No.	Name	Nationality	Position	Date of birth (age)	Signed from	Signed in	Signed until	Apps.	Goals
Goalkeepers
1	Ryan Scully	(Republic of Ireland)	GK	29 October 1992 (age 33)	Greenock Morton	2019	2020	119	0
20	Cammy Gill	(Scotland)	GK	7 April 1998 (age 28)	Dunfermline Athletic youth teams	2016	2021	16	0
50	Owain Fôn Williams	(Wales)	GK	17 March 1987 (age 39)	Hamilton Academical (loan)	2020	2020	6	0
Defenders
2	Aaron Comrie	(Scotland)	DF	3 February 1997 (age 29)	St Johnstone	2019	2020	34	1
3	Tom Lang	(Scotland)	DF	12 June 1997 (age 29)	Clyde	2019	2021	1	0
4	Lewis Martin	(Scotland)	DF	8 April 1996 (age 30)	Dunfermline Athletic youth teams	2012	2021	164	5
5	Euan Murray	(Scotland)	DF	20 January 1996 (age 30)	Raith Rovers	2019	2021	10	2
6	Lee Ashcroft	(Scotland)	DF	29 August 1993 (age 33)	Kilmarnock	2016	2020	163	9
14	Danny Devine	(Republic of Ireland)	DF	7 September 1992 (age 34)	Partick Thistle	2018	2020	55	3
16	Stuart Morrison	(Scotland)	DF	18 April 1999 (age 27)	Fife Elite Football Academy	2016	2020	10	0
24	Josh Edwards	(Scotland)	DF	27 May 2000 (age 26)	Airdrieonians	2019	2021	19	0
Midfielders
7	Joe Thomson	(Scotland)	MF	14 January 1997 (age 29)	Celtic	2018	2020	44	2
8	Tom Beadling	(Australia)	MF	16 January 1996 (age 30)	(England) Sunderland	2018	2020	61	7
11	Ryan Dow	(Scotland)	MF	7 June 1991 (age 35)	Peterhead	2019	2021	28	6
12	Kyle Turner	(Scotland)	MF	10 November 1997 (age 28)	Stranraer	2019	2021	33	5
13	Ethan Ross	(Scotland)	MF	15 August 2001 (age 25)	Aberdeen (loan)	2020	2020	8	0
21	Paul Paton	(Northern Ireland)	MF	18 April 1987 (age 39)	Falkirk	2019	2020	31	0
23	Dom Thomas	(Scotland)	MF	14 February 1996 (age 30)	Kilmarnock (loan)	2020	2020	8	1
—	Dylan Duncan	(England)	MF	25 January 1999 (age 27)	(England) Queens Park Rangers (loan)	2020	2020	0	0
Forwards
9	Gabby McGill	(England)	FW	9 April 2000 (age 26)	(England) Middlesbrough	2019	2021	18	1
10	Jonathan Afolabi	(Republic of Ireland)	FW	14 January 2000 (age 26)	Celtic (loan)	2020	2020	6	2
15	Kevin Nisbet	(Scotland)	FW	8 March 1997 (age 29)	Raith Rovers	2019	2021	32	23
17	Callum Smith	(Scotland)	FW	13 November 1999 (age 26)	Fife Elite Football Academy	2016	2020	25	4
—	Andy Ryan	(Scotland)	FW	29 September 1994 (age 31)	Airdrieonians	2017	2020	62	16

== Results & fixtures ==
Win Draw Loss Postponed

=== Pre-season ===
29 June 2019 Friendly	Forfar Athletic	0–1	Dunfermline Athletic	Forfar, Scotland
14:00		Match report	Turner 20'	Stadium: Station Park; Attendance: 545; Referee: Muir

2 July 2019 Friendly	Dumbarton	Cancelled	Dunfermline Athletic	Dumbarton, Scotland
19:45				Stadium: Dumbarton Football Stadium
Note:

6 July 2019 Friendly	Dunfermline Athletic	1–3	Hibernian	Dunfermline, Scotland
15:00	Murray 4'	Match report	Jackson 48'; Horgan 72' (pen.); Kamberi 77'	Stadium: East End Park; Attendance: 3,200; Referee: Cook

=== Scottish Championship ===
2 August 2019 Match 1	Dunfermline Athletic	2–2	Dundee	Dunfermline, Scotland
19:05	Dow 13'; Nisbet 35'	BBC Sport report	Johnson 45' (pen.), 75' (pen.)	Stadium: East End Park; Attendance: 5,227; Referee: Aitken

10 August 2019 Match 2	Queen of the South	1–1	Dunfermline Athletic	Dumfries, Scotland
15:00	Oliver 62'	BBC Sport report	Turner 8'	Stadium: Palmerston Park; Attendance: 1,562; Referee: Reid

24 August 2019 Match 3	Dunfermline Athletic	0–2	Dundee United	Dunfermline, Scotland
15:00		BBC Sport report	Shankland 10' (goal), 30'	Stadium: East End Park; Attendance: 6,480; Referee: Anderson

31 August 2019 Match 4	Arbroath	1–0	Dunfermline Athletic	Arbroath, Scotland
15:00	Donnelly 50'	BBC Sport report		Stadium: Gayfield Park; Attendance: 1,624; Referee: Kirkland

14 September 2019 Match 5	Dunfermline Athletic	0–1	Inverness CT	Dunfermline, Scotland
15:00		BBC Sport report	Welsh 87' (pen.)	Stadium: East End Park; Attendance: 3,446; Referee: Walsh

21 September 2019 Match 6	Partick Thistle	0–3	Dunfermline Athletic	Maryhill, Scotland
15:00		BBC Sport report	Nisbet 23'; Dow 31'; Turner 49'	Stadium: Firhill Stadium; Attendance: 2,820; Referee: Anderson

28 September 2019 Match 7	Dunfermline Athletic	1–1	Alloa Athletic	Dunfermline, Scotland
15:00	Turner 57'	BBC Sport report	Brown 50'	Stadium: East End Park; Attendance: 3,496; Referee: Steven

5 October 2019 Match 8	Greenock Morton	1–1	Dunfermline Athletic	Greenock, Scotland
15:00	McAlister 90+4'	BBC Sport report	Ryan 87'	Stadium: Cappielow; Attendance: 1,690; Referee: G Beaton

19 October 2019 Match 9	Dunfermline Athletic	3–2	Ayr United	Dunfermline, Scotland
15:00	Kiltie 28'; Ashcroft 63'; Ryan 84'	BBC Sport report	Ashcroft 43' (o.g.); Forrest 57'	Stadium: East End Park; Attendance: 3,905; Referee: Muir

26 October 2019 Match 10	Dundee United	2–0	Dunfermline Athletic	Dundee, Scotland
15:00	Shankland 9'; Clark 27'	BBC Sport report		Stadium: Tannadice Park; Attendance: 7,682; Referee: Reid

29 October 2019 Match 11	Dunfermline Athletic	2–0	Arbroath	Dunfermline, Scotland
19:45	Nisbet 59', 78'	BBC Sport report		Stadium: East End Park; Attendance: 3,488; Referee: McKendrick

2 November 2019 Match 12	Dunfermline Athletic	2–0	Queen of the South	Dunfermline, Scotland
15:00	Dow 57'; Nisbet 82'	BBC Sport report		Stadium: East End Park; Attendance: 3,621; Referee: Dallas

9 November 2019 Match 13	Alloa Athletic	2–1	Dunfermline Athletic	Alloa, Scotland
15:00	Trouten 17' (pen.); Cawley 72'	BBC Sport report	Nisbet 33' (pen.)	Stadium: Recreation Park; Attendance: 1,602; Referee: Napier

30 November 2019 Match 14	Dunfermline Athletic	5–1	Partick Thistle	Dunfermline, Scotland
15:00	Nisbet 4' (pen.), 22' (pen.), 31', 49'; Martin 10'	BBC Sport report	Cole 74'; O'Ware (red card) 4'	Stadium: East End Park; Attendance: 3,948; Referee: Roncone

3 December 2019 Match 15	Ayr United	0–1	Dunfermline Athletic	Ayr, Scotland
19:45		BBC Sport report	Nisbet 68'	Stadium: Somerset Park; Attendance: 1,361; Referee: Anderson

7 December 2019 Match 16	Dunfermline Athletic	3–1	Greenock Morton	Dunfermline, Scotland
15:00	Nisbet 21' (pen.), 84'; Kiltie 52'	BBC Sport report	Lyon 62'	Stadium: East End Park; Attendance: 3,515; Referee: Cook

14 December 2019 Match 17	Dundee	4–3	Dunfermline Athletic	Dundee, Scotland
15:00	Devine 15' (o.g.); Hemmings 25'; McGowan 34'; Johnson 46'	BBC Sport report	Dow 16'; Nisbet 69'; Martin 72'; Kiltie (yellow card) 62' (yellow-red card)	Stadium: Dens Park; Attendance: 4,699; Referee: Clancy

21 December 2019 Match 18	Inverness CT	2–0	Dunfermline Athletic	Inverness, Scotland
15:00	Rooney 33'; McCart 80'	BBC Sport report		Stadium: Caledonian Stadium; Attendance: 2,116; Referee: Newlands

28 December 2019 Match 19	Dunfermline Athletic	1–3	Alloa Athletic	Dunfermline, Scotland
15:00	Nisbet 20'	BBC Sport report	Brown 21'; O'Hara 25'; Flannigan 66' (pen.)	Stadium: East End Park; Attendance: 4,257; Referee: Reid

4 January 2020 Match 20	Dunfermline Athletic	0–1	Ayr United	Dunfermline, Scotland
15:00		Report	Moore 38'	Stadium: East End Park; Attendance: 3,915; Referee: Roncone

11 January 2020 Match 21	Greenock Morton	3–2	Dunfermline Athletic	Greenock, Scotland
15:00	Jacobs 42' 84'; McAlister 49'	Report	Murray 23'; Nisbet 90+3'	Stadium: Cappielow; Attendance: 1,470; Referee: Cook

24 January 2020 Match 22	Dunfermline Athletic	2–0	Dundee	Dunfermline, Scotland
19:05	Dow 28'; Nisbet 40'	Report		Stadium: East End Park; Attendance: 3,722; Referee: Munro

1 February 2020 Match 23	Queen of the South	2–3	Dunfermline Athletic	Dumfries, Scotland
15:00	Oliver 10'; Dobbie 59' (pen.)	Report	McGill 14'; Devine 45'; Ashcroft 82'	Stadium: Palmerston Park; Attendance: 1,302; Referee: Napier

25 February 2020 Match 24	Dunfermline Athletic	1–2	Inverness Caledonian Thistle	Dunfermline, Scotland
19:45	Thomas 70'	Report	Doran 23'; Walsh 77'	Stadium: East End Park; Attendance: 3,397; Referee: Ross

29 February 2020 Match 25	Dunfermline Athletic	2–0	Dundee United	Dunfermline, Scotland
15:00	Nisbet 26'; Afolabi 60'	Report		Stadium: East End Park; Attendance: 6,261; Referee: Beaton

4 March 2020 Match 26	Arbroath	0–0	Dunfermline Athletic	Arbroath, Scotland
19:45		Report		Stadium: Gayfield Park; Attendance: 1,146; Referee: McKendrick

7 March 2020 Match 27	Dunfermline Athletic	1–1	Queen of the South	Dunfermline, Scotland
15:00	Afolabi 46' (pen.)	Report	Oliver 3'	Stadium: East End Park; Attendance: 3,597; Referee: Aitken

10 March 2020 Match 28	Partick Thistle	1–1	Dunfermline Athletic	Glasgow, Scotland
19:45	Graham 90+4'	Report	Murray 72'	Stadium: Firhill Stadium; Attendance: 2,078; Referee: Kirkland

=== Scottish League Cup ===
==== Group stage ====
14 July 2019 Match 1	St Mirren	2–3	Dunfermline Athletic	Paisley, Scotland
15:00	Cooke 63'; Mullen 65'	BBC Sport report	Dow 18'; Ryan 24'; Beadling 40'	Stadium: St Mirren Park; Attendance: 2,067; Referee: McLean

17 July 2019 Match 2	Dunfermline Athletic	6–0	Albion Rovers	Dunfermline, Scotland
19:45	Turner 2', 53'; Nisbet 19', 25', 45'; Comrie 40'	BBC Sport report		Stadium: East End Park; Attendance: 1,693; Referee: Wilson

20 July 2019 Match 3	Edinburgh City	1–0	Dunfermline Athletic	Edinburgh, Scotland
15:00	Handling 87'	BBC Sport report		Stadium: Ainslie Park; Attendance: 1,035; Referee: Irvine

27 July 2019 Match 4	Dunfermline Athletic	4–0	East Kilbride	Dunfermline, Scotland
15:00	Nisbet 3', 50'; Coley 7'; Beadling 16'	BBC Sport report		Stadium: East End Park; Attendance: 1,607; Referee: Lowe

==== Knockout phase ====
17 August 2019 Scottish League Cup round 2	Celtic	2–1 (a.e.t.)	Dunfermline Athletic	Glasgow, Scotland
15:00	Johnston 55'; Forrest 114'	BBC Sport report	Beadling 77'	Stadium: Celtic Park; Attendance: 27,318; Referee: Beaton

=== Scottish Challenge Cup ===
7 September 2019 Challenge Cup round 3	Dunfermline Athletic	1–2	Alloa Athletic	Dunfermline, Scotland
15:00	Kiltie 29'	Report	Thomson 40'; Trouten 53'	Stadium: East End Park; Attendance: 1,448; Referee: (Scotland) Steven McLean

== Squad statistics ==
=== Appearances and goals ===
During the 2019–20 season, Dunfermline used twenty-nine different players in competitive matches. The table below shows the number of appearances and goals scored by each player. Defender Aaron Comrie made the most appearances, playing thirty-four out of a possible 35 games. Kevin Nisbet scored the most goals, with twenty-three in all competitions.

As of 11 March 2020

No.	Pos	Nat	Player	Total		Scottish Championship		Scottish Cup		League Cup		Challenge Cup	
No.	Pos	Nat	Player	Apps	Goals	Apps	Goals	Apps	Goals	Apps	Goals	Apps	Goals
1	GK	(Republic of Ireland) IRL	Ryan Scully	18	0	12	0	1	0	5	0	0	0
2	DF	(Scotland) SCO	Aaron Comrie	34	1	27	0	1	0	5	1	1	0
4	DF	(Scotland) SCO	Lewis Martin	33	2	24+2	2	1	0	5	0	1	0
5	DF	(Scotland) SCO	Euan Murray	11	2	10	2	0	0	1	0	0	0
6	DF	(Scotland) SCO	Lee Ashcroft	31	2	25	2	0	0	5	0	1	0
7	MF	(Scotland) SCO	Joe Thomson	12	0	3+8	0	0+1	0	0	0	0	0
8	MF	(Australia) AUS	Tom Beadling	27	3	11+10	0	0	0	5	3	1	0
9	FW	(England) ENG	Gabby McGill	18	1	6+7	1	0	0	0+4	0	1	0
10	FW	(Republic of Ireland) IRL	Jonathan Afolabi	6	2	6	2	0	0	0	0	0	0
11	MF	(Scotland) SCO	Ryan Dow	28	6	22	5	1	0	5	1	0	0
12	MF	(Scotland) SCO	Kyle Turner	33	5	23+3	3	1	0	3+2	2	1	0
13	MF	(Scotland) SCO	Ethan Ross	8	0	4+4	0	0	0	0	0	0	0
14	DF	(Republic of Ireland) IRL	Danny Devine	18	1	15+2	1	1	0	0	0	0	0
15	FW	(Scotland) SCO	Kevin Nisbet	32	23	23+2	18	1	0	5	5	0+1	0
20	GK	(Scotland) SCO	Cammy Gill	12	0	10	0	0+1	0	0	0	1	0
21	MF	(Northern Ireland) NIR	Paul Paton	30	0	23+1	0	0	0	5	0	1	0
23	MF	(Scotland) SCO	Dom Thomas	8	1	8	1	0	0	0	0	0	0
24	DF	(Scotland) SCO	Josh Edwards	19	0	11+4	0	1	0	1+1	0	0+1	0
26	MF	(Scotland) SCO	Matty Todd	7	0	0+5	0	0	0	0+1	0	1	0
27	FW	(Northern Ireland) NIR	Lewis McCann	19	0	6+8	0	1	0	1+3	0	0	0
39	DF	(Scotland) SCO	Miller Fenton	0	0	0	0	0	0	0	0	0	0
50	GK	(Wales) WAL	Owain Fôn Williams	6	0	6	0	0	0	0	0	0	0
—	MF	(England) ENG	Dylan Duncan	0	0	0	0	0	0	0	0	0	0
Players away from the club on loan:
3	DF	(Scotland) SCO	Tom Lang (on loan at Clyde)	1	0	0	0	0	0	0	0	1	0
16	DF	(Scotland) SCO	Stuart Morrison (on loan at Queens Park)	8	0	1+3	0	0	0	4	0	0	0
17	FW	(Scotland) SCO	Callum Smith (on loan at Airdrieonians)	0	0	0	0	0	0	0	0	0	0
18	DF	(Scotland) SCO	Paul Allan (on loan at Brechin City)	2	0	0	0	0	0	0+2	0	0	0
—	FW	(Scotland) SCO	Andy Ryan (on loan at Airdrieonians)	19	3	7+6	2	1	0	2+2	1	0+1	0
Players who appeared for Dunfermline Athletic but left during the season:
22	MF	(England) ENG	Josh Coley	11	1	3+4	0	0	0	3+1	1	0	0
23	MF	(Scotland) SCO	Harry Cochrane	16	1	7+5	0	0	0	3+1	1	0	0
37	MF	(Scotland) SCO	Anthony McDonald	2	0	0+2	0	0	0	0	0	0	0
38	MF	(Scotland) SCO	Greg Kiltie	16	3	15	2	0	0	0	0	1	1

=== Goalscorers ===
During the 2019–20 season, sixteen Dunfermline players scored 57 goals in all competitions.

As of match played 10 March 2020

Place	Position	Nation	Name	Total	Scottish Championship	Scottish Cup	Scottish League Cup	Scottish Challenge Cup
1	FW	(Scotland)	Kevin Nisbet	23	18		5	
2	MF	(Scotland)	Ryan Dow	6	5		1	
3	MF	(Scotland)	Kyle Turner	5	3		2	
4	MF	(Australia)	Tom Beadling	3			3	
4	MF	(Scotland)	Greg Kiltie	3	2			1
4	FW	(Scotland)	Andy Ryan	3	2		1	
7	DF	(Scotland)	Lee Ashcroft	2	2			
7	DF	(Scotland)	Lewis Martin	2	2			
7	DF	(Scotland)	Euan Murray	2	2			
7	FW	(Republic of Ireland)	Jonathan Afolabi	2	2			
11	DF	(Republic of Ireland)	Danny Devine	1	1			
11	MF	(Scotland)	Dom Thomas	1	1			
11	FW	(England)	Gabby McGill	1	1			
11	DF	(Scotland)	Aaron Comrie	1			1	
11	MF	(Scotland)	Harry Cochrane	1			1	
11	MF	(England)	Josh Coley	1			1	
Total				57	41	0	15	1

== Club statistics ==
=== League table ===
Pos	Team	Pld	W	D	L	GF	GA	GD	Pts	PPG	Promotion, qualification or relegation (Note: All play-off matches were cancelled, as clubs voted to curtail the season due to the COVID-19 pandemic in Scotland.)
4	Ayr United	27	12	4	11	38	35	+3	40	1.48	
5	Arbroath	26	10	6	10	24	26	−2	36	1.38	
6	Dunfermline Athletic	28	10	7	11	41	36	+5	37	1.32	
7	Greenock Morton	28	10	6	12	45	52	−7	36	1.29	
8	Alloa Athletic	28	7	10	11	33	43	−10	31	1.11	

Source: SPFL
Rules for classification: 1) Points per game.

==== Results by round ====
Round	1	2	3	4	5	6	7	8	9	10	11	12	13	14	15	16	17	18	19	20	21	22	23	24	25	26	27	28
Ground	H	A	H	A	H	A	H	A	H	A	H	H	A	H	A	H	A	A	H	H	A	H	A	H	H	A	H	A
Result	D	D	L	L	L	W	D	D	W	L	W	W	L	W	W	W	L	L	L	L	L	W	W	L	W	D	D	D
Position	4	6	8	9	10	7	7	9	7	8	6	6	6	6	4	3	4	5	5	5	5	5	4	7	6	5	5	5

Updated to match(es) played on 11 March 2020. Source: DAFC.co.uk
A = Away; H = Home; W = Win; D = Draw; L = Loss

==== Results summary ====
Overall								Home						Away					
Pld	W	D	L	GF	GA	GD	Pts	W	D	L	GF	GA	GD	W	D	L	GF	GA	GD
28	10	7	11	41	36	+5	37	7	3	5	25	17	+8	3	4	6	16	19	−3

Last updated: 11 March 2020.
Source: Scottish Championship

=== League cup table ===
Pos	Team	Pld	W	PW	PL	L	GF	GA	GD	Pts	Qualification	DNF	ALB	STM	EKB	EDI
1	Dunfermline Athletic	4	3	0	0	1	13	3	+10	9	Qualification for the Second Round	—	6–0	—	4–0	—
2	Albion Rovers	4	2	0	1	1	3	7	−4	7		—	—	0–0p	—	2–1
3	St Mirren	4	1	1	1	1	3	3	0	6		2–3	—	—	—	1–0
4	East Kilbride	4	1	1	0	2	1	5	−4	5		—	0–1	p0–0	—	—
5	Edinburgh City	4	1	0	0	3	2	4	−2	3		1–0	—	—	0–1	—

Rules for classification: 1) goal difference, 2) goals scored, 3) away goals scored, 4) matches won, 5) away matches won, 6) drawing of lots.

== Transfers ==
=== First team ===
==== Players in ====
Date	Position	No.	Nationality	Name	From	Fee	Ref.
14 May 2019	MF	11	(Scotland)	Ryan Dow	Peterhead	Free	
15 May 2019	DF	2	(Scotland)	Aaron Comrie	St Johnstone	Free	
28 May 2019	MF	12	(Scotland)	Kyle Turner	Stranraer	Development compensation	
30 May 2019	FW	9	(England)	Gabby McGill	(England) Middlesbrough	Development compensation	
13 June 2019	FW	15	(Scotland)	Kevin Nisbet	Raith Rovers	Undisclosed	
13 June 2019	DF	5	(Scotland)	Euan Murray	Raith Rovers	Undisclosed	
14 June 2019	MF	21	(Northern Ireland)	Paul Paton	Falkirk	Free	
16 July 2019	DF	24	(Scotland)	Josh Edwards	Airdrieonians	Undisclosed	
19 July 2019	DF	3	(Scotland)	Tom Lang	Clyde	Undisclosed	

==== Players out ====
Date	Position	No.	Nationality	Name	To	Fee	Ref.
31 May 2019	GK	1	(Scotland)	Sean Murdoch	Retired		
31 May 2019	DF	2	(Scotland)	Ryan Williamson	Partick Thistle	Free	
31 May 2019	DF	5	(Scotland)	Mark Durnan	Falkirk	Free	
31 May 2019	MF	7	(England)	Kallum Higginbotham	(India) Real Kashmir	Free	
31 May 2019	FW	10	(Scotland)	Louis Longridge	Falkirk	Free	
31 May 2019	MF	11	(Scotland)	Aidan Connolly	Falkirk	Free	
31 May 2019	MF	15	(England)	Myles Hippolyte	(England) Yeovil Town	Free	
31 May 2019	GK	16	(England)	Lee Robinson	Free agent	Released	
31 May 2019	MF	21	(Scotland)	Brandon Luke	Stenhousemuir	Free	
31 May 2019	MF	28	(England)	James Craigen	(England) AFC Fylde	Free	
31 May 2019	FW	36	(Scotland)	Robbie Muirhead	Greenock Morton	Free	
13 June 2019	DF	3	(Scotland)	Jackson Longridge	(England) Bradford City	Undisclosed	

==== Loans in ====
Date	Position	No.	Nationality	Name	From	Duration	Ref.
21 June 2019	MF	22	(England)	Josh Coley	(England) Norwich City	End of season (recalled in January)	
30 August 2019	MF	23	(Scotland)	Harry Cochrane	Heart of Midlothian	End of season (recalled in January)	
30 August 2019	MF	37	(Scotland)	Anthony McDonald	Heart of Midlothian	End of season (recalled in January)	
2 September 2019	MF	38	(Scotland)	Greg Kiltie	Kilmarnock	End of season (recalled in January)	
3 January 2020	MF	13	(Scotland)	Ethan Ross	Aberdeen	End of season	
10 January 2020	MF	23	(Scotland)	Dom Thomas	Kilmarnock	End of season	
27 January 2020	FW	10	(Republic of Ireland)	Jonathan Afolabi	Celtic	End of season	
31 January 2020	MF	—	(England)	Dylan Duncan	(England) Queens Park Rangers	End of season	
30 January 2020	GK	50	(Wales)	Owain Fôn Williams	Hamilton Academical	End of season	

==== Loans out ====
Date	Position	No.	Nationality	Name	To	Duration	Ref.
16 July 2019	FW	17	(Scotland)	Callum Smith	Airdrieonians	End of season	
27 September 2019	DF	18	(Scotland)	Paul Allan	Brechin City	Initially 4 months, extended until end of season	
9 January 2020	FW	—	(Scotland)	Andy Ryan	Airdrieonians	End of season	
14 January 2020	DF	3	(Scotland)	Tom Lang	Clyde	End of season	
31 January 2020	DF	16	(Scotland)	Stuart Morrison	Queen's Park	End of season	

=== Reserve team ===
==== Players in ====
Date	Position	No.	Nationality	Name	From	Fee	Ref.
13 May 2019	DF	34	(England)	Thomas Bragg	(England) Southampton	Free	
29 May 2019	DF	19	(England)	Matthew Bowman	(England) Scarborough Athletic	Free	
30 January 2020	MF	38	(Scotland)	Scott Cusick	Celtic	Free	

==== Players out ====
Date	Position	No.	Nationality	Name	To	Fee	Ref.
12 November 2019	DF	31	(Scotland)	Kieran Swanson	(United States) FirstPoint USA	Free	

==== Loans out ====
Date	Position	No.	Nationality	Name	To	Duration	Ref.
11 July 2019	DF	31	(Scotland)	Kieran Swanson	Camelon Juniors	End of season	
25 July 2019	FW	29	(Scotland)	Lewis Crosbie	Crossgates Primrose	End of season	
25 July 2019	MF	32	(Scotland)	Lewis Sawers	Crossgates Primrose	End of season	
26 July 2019	DF	25	(Scotland)	Gregor Jordan	Kennoway Star Hearts	End of season	
30 July 2019	DF	33	(Scotland)	Paul Brown	Kennoway Star Hearts		
6 August 2019	DF	28	(Scotland)	Josh Robertson	Civil Service Strollers	Five months	
16 August 2019	DF	34	(England)	Thomas Bragg	Kelty Hearts	Five months	
24 September 2019	GK	30	(Scotland)	Craig Burt	Crossgates Primrose	Four months	
31 January 2020	DF	19	(England)	Matthew Bowman	(England) Pickering Town	End of season	

== Contract extensions ==
Date	Position	Nationality	Name	Length	Expiry	Ref.
13 May 2019	GK	(Republic of Ireland)	Ryan Scully	1 year	2020	
13 May 2019	GK	(Scotland)	Cammy Gill	2 years	2021	
13 May 2019	DF	(Scotland)	Lewis Martin	1 year	2020	
13 May 2019	DF	(Scotland)	Paul Allan	1 year	2020	
24 May 2019	DF	(Scotland)	Stuart Morrison	1 year	2020	
30 May 2019	FW	(Scotland)	Andy Ryan	1 year	2020	
10 January 2020	DF	(Scotland)	Lewis Martin	1 year	2021	
10 January 2020	MF	(Scotland)	Ryan Dow	1 year	2021	
29 January 2020	DF	(Scotland)	Paul Allan	2 years	2022	
29 January 2020	MF	(Scotland)	Matthew Todd	2 years	2022	
29 January 2020	FW	(Northern Ireland)	Lewis McCann	2 years	2022	
