= Craig Wighton =

Scottish footballer

Personal information
- Full name: Craig Ross Wighton
- Date of birth: 27 July 1997 (age 29)
- Place of birth: Dundee, Scotland
- Position: Forward

Youth career
- 2012–2013: Dundee

Senior career*
Years	Team	Apps	(Gls)
2013–2018	Dundee	83	(7)
2014–2015	→ Brechin City (loan)	4	(2)
2015–2016	→ Raith Rovers (loan)	16	(1)
2018–2021	Heart of Midlothian	27	(3)
2020	→ Arbroath (loan)	5	(3)
2021	→ Dunfermline Athletic (loan)	10	(6)
2021–2025	Dunfermline Athletic	81	(21)
2022	→ Arbroath (loan)	13	(0)
2025	→ Montrose (loan)	12	(1)
2025	Montrose	3	(0)
Total		254	(44)

International career
2012	Scotland U15	2	(0)
2013	Scotland U16	3	(0)
2013–2014	Scotland U17	14	(6)
2015–2016	Scotland U19	5	(0)
2017	Scotland U20	5	(1)
2016–2018	Scotland U21	6	(0)
- * Club domestic league appearances and goals

Craig Ross Wighton (born 27 July 1997) is a Scottish former professional footballer who played as a forward. He represented Dundee, Heart of Midlothian, Dunfermline Athletic, Brechin City, Raith Rovers, Arbroath and Montrose.

== Club career ==
=== Dundee ===
==== Youth ====
While attending Harris Academy, Wighton was snapped by Dundee under the management of Barry Smith, the team he supported as a boy. He came through the same training clinic, run by Ian Cathro, as fellow Scottish prospects Ryan Gauld and John Souttar. Wighton revealed he turned down a move to local rivals Dundee United, as his family are Dundee supporters. While growing up, Wighton initially played out wide before joining Dundee, who then moved him into the striker position.

Manager John Brown said in March 2013 that if Wighton continued his form at youth level he could soon make the first team, which could have meant him becoming the club's youngest-ever first-team player. His first team debut for the club was delayed due to SPL rules. Despite interest from elsewhere, Wighton signed his first professional contract on his 16th birthday. After signing a professional contract, he left school to concentrate on his football career.

==== 2013–14 ====
In the 2013–14 season, Wighton made his debut for the club, coming on as a substitute for Craig Beattie in the 81st minute, as Dundee beat Cowdenbeath 2–0 on 5 October 2013. In his second appearance, Wighton set up two goals as Dundee beat Dumbarton 4–1 on 12 October 2013. He then made his first start for the club, as Dundee beat Queen of the South 2–1 on 19 October 2013.

He became the youngest-ever scorer in a competitive game for Dundee at the age of 16 years, three months and 13 days on 9 November 2013, beating the record held by Jocky Scott, scoring a goal in a 2–0 win against Raith Rovers. His second goal came on 14 April 2014, when he scored after six minutes, as Dundee beat Cowdenbeath 4–0. Throughout his debut season he regularly contributed in the Dundee first team, making a total of 14 appearances and scoring two goals for the club, in all competitions as Dundee won the Scottish Championship. Throughout the season Wighton was linked with a move to Premier League clubs and Rangers. At the end of the 2013–14 season, the club's manager Paul Hartley said he may consider loaning out Wighton to gain first team experience with the hope he could "do a Stevie May," the striker who Hartley had on loan at Alloa Athletic from St Johnstone in 2011–12 and had gone on to be a first team regular in the Scottish Premiership, earning a move to Sheffield Wednesday.

==== 2014–15 ====
On 16 August 2014, Wighton scored his first Premiership goal as Dundee drew 1–1 with Partick Thistle, although afterwards, Hartley said he didn't want to talk too much about Wighton, but did announce he had signed a new three-year contract. As a result of his performance, the club decided not to send Wighton on loan.

On 18 December 2014, Wighton moved on a short-term loan to Brechin City. After making his debut as a substitute he went on to score two in three starting appearances as well as aiding Brechin to a win over local rivals Forfar with a creative flick past the Forfar defence to assist Alan Trouten to his winning goal at Station Park.

==== 2015–16 ====
On 23 June 2015, after much speculation it was finally confirmed that Wighton had joined Raith Rovers on a six-month loan deal. On 3 January 2016, it was confirmed that following Wighton's loan spell at Raith Rovers he had returned to Dundee. Wighton managed to add 2 goals to his name after returning to the club from his loan spell, he came off the bench to score in an empathic 5-2 Victory over Ross County and more noticeably he scored a 93rd minute winning goal in a Dundee derby known as the "Doon Derby", a result which confirmed that rivals Dundee United would be relegated.

==== 2016–17 ====
Wighton signed a three-year contract with Dundee in June 2016.

Wighton picked up a Man of the Match award with an impressive performance in a 2-0 Victory over Motherwell having set up both goals. After a frustrating season with the club just avoiding relegation Wighton revealed that his glimpses of quality throughout the season were not good enough as he was determined to show more consistency the season after.

==== 2017–18 ====
After impressing manager Neil McCann in pre-season, Wighton picked up a knee ligament injury which ruled him out for several months. A season which was described to be "Very Crucial" for Wighton's development and career, McCann also went on to say he was "heartbroken" for the youngster due to the situation.

=== Heart of Midlothian ===
==== 2018–19 ====
Wighton moved to Heart of Midlothian for an undisclosed transfer fee in August 2018.

==== 2019–20 and Arbroath ====
He was dropped from the Hearts first team squad by Daniel Stendel in January 2020, and was then loaned to Arbroath. Wighton scored on his debut with the Lichties in a win over Partick Thistle. After impressing in his short spell for the Lichties with 3 goals in 5 games, Wighton returned to Hearts in May due to the early curtailment of the 2019–20 season due to the COVID-19 pandemic.

==== 2020–21 ====
Wighton scored his first goals for Hearts when he scored a hat-trick in a Scottish League Cup tie against Raith Rovers. He went on to play for Hearts as a substitute in the 2020 Scottish Cup Final, however he had his penalty in the shootout saved by Conor Hazard as Hearts ultimately lost.

=== Dunfermline Athletic ===
On 4 February 2021, Wighton agreed to sign a pre-contract with Dunfermline Athletic and a week later, signed on loan for the club for the remainder of the 2020–21 season.

==== Arbroath (loan) ====
On 14 January 2022, Wighton once again joined Scottish Championship table-toppers Arbroath on loan for the remainder of the season.

==== Return to first team ====
On 14 April 2023, during a successful campaign in Scottish League One the following season under new manager and former teammate James McPake during which he had his highest-scoring season yet, Wighton signed a new two-year contract with the Pars to remain at the club until 2025. The next day, Wighton would score a brace in a 5–0 rout of Queen of the South at East End Park which officially confirmed Dunfermline as Scottish League One champions. Wighton would finish the season with 20 goals, his highest total in his career.

After scoring 6 goals in 24 appearances the following season including 5 goals in the Championship, Wighton suffered a knee injury in February 2024 in a game against Greenock Morton, which manager McPake confirmed would likely rule him out for the remainder of the season, though he would return in the last game as a substitute.

=== Montrose ===
On 6 February 2025, Wighton joined Scottish League One club Montrose on loan until the end of the season. He made his debut for the Gable Endies two days later in a league draw at home to Alloa Athletic. On 15 March, Wighton scored his first goal for Montrose in a home league game against Cove Rangers. On 7 May, Wighton's parent club Dunfermline Athletic announced that he would depart the club following the end of his contract.

On 9 May 2025, Wighton signed permanently for Montrose on a two-year deal. He retired from professional football in August 2025, saying his body could no longer cope with its demands.

== Style of play ==
His then teammate at Dundee, Gavin Rae said Wighton's playing style reminds him of Aaron Ramsey, who Rae played alongside in his time at Cardiff City. Then assistant manager Ray Farningham described Wighton as "one of the top young prospects in the Scottish game."

== International career ==
Wighton represented the Scotland Under-15 side once and also played for the Under-16's.

He was chosen to be part of the Scotland Under-17 squad for the 2014 UEFA European Under-17 Championship. On 23 September 2013, Wighton scored a hat-trick (the first in his professional career), as Scotland beat Slovenia Under-17 3–1. Scotland made it through to the semi-final, however they were eliminated from the competition as they lost 5–0 to the Netherlands.

Wighton was selected for the under-20 squad in the 2017 Toulon Tournament. The team secured the bronze medal, the nations first ever medal at the competition. He chosen for the under-21 squad in the 2018 Toulon Tournament, The team lost to Turkey in a penalty-out and finished fourth this time.

== Career statistics ==
As of match played 16 August 2025

Appearances and goals by club, season and competition
Club	Season	League			Scottish Cup		League Cup		Other		Total	
Club	Season	Division	Apps	Goals	Apps	Goals	Apps	Goals	Apps	Goals	Apps	Goals
Dundee	2013–14	Scottish Championship	13	2	1	0	0	0	0	0	14	2
Dundee	2014–15	Scottish Premiership	16	1	1	0	0	0	—		17	1
Dundee	2015–16	Scottish Premiership	13	2	2	0	0	0	—		15	2
Dundee	2016–17	Scottish Premiership	31	2	1	0	3	0	—		35	2
Dundee	2017–18	Scottish Premiership	7	0	0	0	0	0	—		7	0
Dundee	2018–19	Scottish Premiership	3	0	0	0	5	1	—		8	1
Dundee	Total		83	7	5	0	8	1	0	0	94	8
Brechin City (loan)	2014–15	Scottish League One	4	2	0	0	0	0	0	0	4	2
Raith Rovers (loan)	2015–16	Scottish Championship	16	1	0	0	3	0	2 (Note: Appearances in the Scottish Challenge Cup)	0	21	1
Heart of Midlothian	2018–19	Scottish Premiership	17	0	2	0	0	0	0	0	19	0
Heart of Midlothian	2019–20	Scottish Premiership	2	0	2	1	1	0	0	0	5	1
Heart of Midlothian	2020–21	Scottish Championship	8	3	0	0	5	3	0	0	13	6
Heart of Midlothian	Total		27	3	4	1	6	3	0	0	37	7
Arbroath (loan)	2019–20	Scottish Championship	5	3	0	0	0	0	0	0	5	3
Dunfermline Athletic (loan)	2020–21	Scottish Championship	10	6	1	0	0	0	2 (Note: Appearances in the Scottish Premiership Playoffs)	0	13	6
Dunfermline Athletic	2021–22	Scottish Championship	14	0	0	0	5	3	0	0	19	3
Dunfermline Athletic	2022–23	Scottish League One	34	16	2	2	3	0	3	2	42	20
Dunfermline Athletic	2023–24	Scottish Championship	20	5	1	0	4	1	0	0	25	6
Dunfermline Athletic	2024–25	Scottish Championship	13	0	1	0	2	0	3	0	19	0
Dunfermline Athletic	Total		81	21	4	2	14	4	6	2	105	29
Arbroath (loan)	2021–22	Scottish Championship	13	0	2	1	0	0	1 (Note: Appearance in the Premiership play-offs)	0	16	1
Montrose (loan)	2024–25	Scottish League One	12	1	—		—		0	0	12	1
Montrose	2025–26	Scottish League One	3	0	0	0	4	1	0	0	7	1
Career total			254	44	16	4	35	9	11	2	316	59

== Honours ==
Dundee

- Scottish Championship: 2013–14

Hearts

- Scottish Championship: 2020–21

Dunfermline Athletic

- Scottish League One: 2022–23
