= Kevin O'Hara (footballer) =

Scottish footballer (born 1998)

- O'Hara with Larne in 2026

Personal information
- Date of birth: 11 August 1998 (age 28)
- Place of birth: Stirling, Scotland
- Height: 1.78 m (5 ft 10 in)
- Position: Striker

Team information
- Current team: Larne
- Number: 19

Youth career
- –2015: Falkirk
- 2013–2014: → Forth Valley Academy

Senior career*
Years	Team	Apps	(Gls)
2015–2019	Falkirk	34	(0)
2016–2017	→ East Fife (loan)	16	(3)
2018–2019	→ Stenhousemuir (loan)	15	(0)
2019–2020	Alloa Athletic	27	(10)
2020–2023	Dunfermline Athletic	76	(17)
2023–2026	Hamilton Academical	103	(25)
2026–	Larne	4	(0)

International career
2013–2014	Scotland U16	3	(1)
2016	Scotland U19	1	(0)
- * Club domestic league appearances and goals as of 20:30, 28 September 2026 (UTC)

Kevin O'Hara (born 11 August 1998) is a Scottish professional footballer who plays as a striker for Larne. O'Hara has previously played for Falkirk, East Fife, Stenhousemuir, Alloa Athletic, Dunfermline Athletic and Hamilton Academical.

== Club career ==
O'Hara was raised in the village of Fallin and attended Wallace High School in Stirling. Having spent time training with the Forth Valley Football Academy, he began his professional career with Falkirk, making his senior debut in a league game on 12 April 2015. After strong performances for the club's Development League team, he was in contention for a place in the squad for the 2015 Scottish Cup Final, although in the end he was not selected.

He spent a loan spell with East Fife between July 2016 and January 2017, scoring 3 goals in 19 appearances in all competitions.

In November 2017 he received an 8-match 'excessive misconduct' ban for abusing Dean Shiels about his disability during a game against Dunfermline Athletic.

On 13 August 2018, O'Hara joined League One club Stenhousemuir on a six-month loan deal. He was recalled on 3 January 2019.

O'Hara was released by Falkirk at the end of the 2018–19 season, following the club's relegation to League One.

In July 2019, O'Hara signed for Scottish Championship club Alloa Athletic. After an impressive year with Alloa during which he scored 14 goals in 35 matches, O'Hara signed a three-year contract with Dunfermline Athletic on 10 July 2020. Following relegation in his second season with the club, O'Hara was part of the Dunfermline team who won the League One title in the 2022–23 season. Following the end of his contract, O'Hara was released by Dunfermline.

O'Hara signed with Hamilton Academical in June 2023. He was criticised at the start of the season due to a lack of goals, but scored a hat-trick on 11 November 2023. In March 2024 he extended his contract to 2026.

He left Hamilton in June 2026, and then signed for Larne in the NIFL Premiership. O'Hara scored his first goal in a UEFA competition in on 20 August 2026, when he scored in stoppage time in the playoff round of 2026–27 UEFA Conference League qualifying against Lincoln Red Imps.

== International career ==
O'Hara has been involved with Scotland at various youth age group levels. In October 2013, he became the first Forth Valley Academy player to be selected for a national squad.

== Career statistics ==
As of 8 May 2023

Appearances and goals by club, season and competition
Club	Season	League			National Cup		League Cup		Other		Total	
Club	Season	Division	Apps	Goals	Apps	Goals	Apps	Goals	Apps	Goals	Apps	Goals
Falkirk	2014–15	Scottish Championship	1	0	0	0	0	0	0	0	1	0
Falkirk	2015–16	Scottish Championship	14	0	1	0	0	0	1 (Note: Appearance in the Scottish Premiership play-offs)	0	16	0
Falkirk	2016–17	Scottish Championship	0	0	0	0	0	0	0	0	0	0
Falkirk	2017–18	Scottish Championship	18	0	0	0	3	0	1 (Note: Appearances in the Scottish Challenge Cup)	0	22	0
Falkirk	2018–19	Scottish Championship	1	0	0	0	3	0	0	0	4	0
Falkirk	Total		34	0	1	0	6	0	2	0	43	0
East Fife (loan)	2016–17	Scottish League One	16	3	0	0	2	0	1	0	19	3
Stenhousemuir (loan)	2018–19	Scottish League One	15	0	0	0	0	0	1	0	16	0
Alloa Athletic	2019–20	Scottish Championship	27	10	2	3	4	1	2	0	35	14
Dunfermline Athletic	2020–21	Scottish Championship	24	8	1	0	6	3	2 (Note: Appearances in the Scottish Premiership Playoffs)	0	33	11
Dunfermline Athletic	2021–22	Scottish Championship	34	6	1	0	5	3	0	0	40	9
Dunfermline Athletic	2022–23	Scottish League One	18	3	2	0	4	0	0	0	24	3
Dunfermline Athletic	Total		76	17	4	0	15	3	2	0	97	23
Career total			168	30	7	3	27	7	8	0	210	40

== Honours ==
Dunfermline Athletic

- Scottish League One: 2022–23
