= Cammy Gill =

Scottish footballer

Personal information
- Date of birth: 7 April 1998 (age 28)
- Position: Goalkeeper

Team information
- Current team: Montrose
- Number: 1

Youth career
- –2008: Edinburgh South Boys Club
- 2008–2016: Dunfermline Athletic

Senior career*
Years	Team	Apps	(Gls)
2016–2021	Dunfermline Athletic	12	(0)
2017	→ Arbroath (loan)	0	(0)
2021–2022	Cowdenbeath	33	(0)
2022–2023	Arbroath	1	(0)
2023–	Montrose	88	(0)

International career^{‡}
2014	Scotland U16		
2018	Scotland U20	1	(0)
- * Club domestic league appearances and goals as of 4 May 2026 ‡ National team caps and goals as of 23:13, 31 May 2021 (UTC)

Cameron Gill (born 7 April 1998) is a Scottish professional footballer who plays as a goalkeeper for Montrose. Gill began his career with Dunfermline Athletic and also played for Arbroath and Cowdenbeath.

== Early and personal life ==
Gill attended Gracemount High School in Edinburgh.

== Club career ==
Gill began his career with Edinburgh South Boys Club, joining Dunfermline Athletic at under-11 level. In January 2017 he signed a new contract with the club, following links to clubs including Scottish Premiership sides Celtic and Heart of Midlothian, and later that month he moved on loan to Arbroath. Upon his return to Dunfermline he stated his intention to break into the first team.

Following the departure of Hutton at the end of the 2016–17 season, Gill became Dunfermline's second-choice goalkeeper for the 2017–18 season. He made his senior debut on 2 September 2017, coming on as a second-half substitute in a Scottish Challenge Cup match with Buckie Thistle, with the youngster keeping a clean sheet in 30 minutes he was on the field of play. Gill made his first full start for Dunfermline on 28 July 2018, in a Scottish League Cup match at East End Park against Stirling Albion.

Gill failed to make any sort of sustained breakthrough with Dunfermline, appearing just 19 times for the side before his release in May 2021. Shortly after leaving the club he signed with Fife rivals Cowdenbeath.

In May 2022 he re-signed for Arbroath. In May 2023 he signed for Montrose.

== International career ==
After previously playing for the Scotland under-16 team, he was called up by the Scotland under-20 team in November 2018.

== Career statistics ==
As of match played 6 May 2022

Appearances and goals by club, season and competition
Club	Season	League			Scottish Cup		Scottish League Cup		Other		Total	
Club	Season	Division	Apps	Goals	Apps	Goals	Apps	Goals	Apps	Goals	Apps	Goals
Dunfermline Athletic	2016–17	Scottish Championship	0	0	0	0	0	0	0	0	0	0
Dunfermline Athletic	2017–18	Scottish Championship	0	0	0	0	0	0	1 (Note: Appearance(s) in the Scottish Challenge Cup.)	0	1	0
Dunfermline Athletic	2018–19	Scottish Championship	1	0	0	0	1	0	1	0	3	0
Dunfermline Athletic	2019–20	Scottish Championship	10	0	1	0	0	0	1	0	12	0
Dunfermline Athletic	2020–21	Scottish Championship	1	0	0	0	2	0	0	0	3	0
Dunfermline Athletic	Total		12	0	1	0	3	0	3	0	19	0
Arbroath (loan)	2016–17	Scottish League Two	0	0	0	0	0	0	0	0	0	0
Cowdenbeath	2021–22	Scottish League Two	33	0	1	0	4	0	2	0	40	0
Career total			45	0	2	0	7	0	5	0	59	0
