= Paul Allan =

Scottish footballer (born 2000)

Personal information
- Date of birth: 7 February 2000 (age 26)
- Place of birth: Scotland
- Height: 1.75 m (5 ft 9 in)
- Position: Defensive midfielder

Team information
- Current team: Inverness Caledonian Thistle
- Number: 7

Youth career
- –2010: Inverkeithing Boys Club
- 2010-2018: Dunfermline Athletic

Senior career*
Years	Team	Apps	(Gls)
2017–2024	Dunfermline Athletic	67	(0)
2017–2018	→ Stenhousemuir (loan)	3	(0)
2018	→ Hill of Beath Hawthorn (loan)		
2019–2020	→ Brechin City (loan)	19	(1)
2020–2021	→ Albion Rovers (loan)	7	(0)
2024–	Inverness Caledonian Thistle	63	(7)
- * Club domestic league appearances and goals as of 09:52, 3 May 2026 (UTC)

Paul Allan (born 7 February 2000) is a Scottish professional footballer who plays as a defensive midfielder for Scottish Championship side Inverness Caledonian Thistle. Allan previously played for Dunfermline Athletic, with loan spells with Stenhousemuir, Hill of Beath Hawthorn, Brechin City and Albion Rovers.

== Career ==
Allan started his youth career at Inverkeithing Boys Club, before joining Dunfermline Athletic at the age of 10. He signed a two-year contract with the club in May 2017, and had spells on loan at Stenhousemuir – for whom he made three appearances – and Hill of Beath Hawthorn during the 2017–18 season.

He made his debut for Dunfermline Athletic on 14 August 2018 in a 2–1 victory over Inverness Caledonian Thistle in the Scottish Challenge Cup.

In September 2019, he joined Brechin City on loan until January 2020. In January 2020, the loan was extended until the end of the season. He appeared in 19 league matches for the club, scoring once.

In October 2020, Allan joined Scottish League Two side Albion Rovers on a season-long loan, with the loan being ended by his parent club in January.

In August 2024, Allan left Dunfermline and joined Scottish League One side, Inverness Caledonian Thistle.

== Honours ==
Inverness Caledonian Thistle

- Scottish League One: 2025–26
