= 2022–23 Scottish League One =

Scottish League One
- Season: 2022–23
- Dates: 30 July 2022 – 6 May 2023
- Champions: Dunfermline Athletic
- Promoted: Dunfermline Athletic; Airdrieonians (via play-offs)
- Relegated: Clyde (via play-offs); Peterhead
- Matches: 180
- Goals: 533 (2.96 per match)
- Top goalscorer: Calum Gallagher; Ruari Paton; 22 goals
- Biggest home win: Airdrieonians 7–0 Peterhead (18 March 2023)
- Biggest away win: Airdrieonians 0–6 Edinburgh (3 September 2022)
- Highest scoring: Airdrieonians 3–5 Edinburgh (2 January 2023)
- Longest winning run: Airdrieonians; Falkirk; 5 games
- Longest unbeaten run: Dunfermline Athletic; 24 games
- Longest winless run: Clyde; 21 games
- Longest losing run: Clyde; 11 games
- Highest attendance: 9,530; Dunfermline Athletic 2–0 Falkirk (7 March 2023)
- Lowest attendance: 229; Edinburgh 2–0 Peterhead (5 October 2022)
- Total attendance: 281,262
- Average attendance: 1,562
- All statistics correct as of 6 May 2023.

The 2022–23 Scottish League One (known as cinch League One for sponsorship reasons) was the tenth season of Scottish League One, the third tier of Scottish football.

Ten teams contested the league: Airdrieonians, Alloa Athletic, Clyde, Dunfermline Athletic, Edinburgh, Falkirk, Kelty Hearts, Montrose, Peterhead and Queen of the South.

== Teams ==
The following teams changed division after the 2021–22 season.

=== To League One ===
Promoted from League Two

- Edinburgh
- Kelty Hearts

Relegated from the Championship

- Dunfermline Athletic
- Queen of the South

=== From League One ===
Relegated to League Two

- East Fife
- Dumbarton

Promoted to the Championship

- Cove Rangers
- Queen's Park

=== Stadia and locations ===
Airdrieonians	Alloa Athletic	Clyde	Dunfermline Athletic
Excelsior Stadium	Recreation Park	New Douglas Park	East End Park
Capacity: 10,101	Capacity: 3,100	Capacity: 6,018	Capacity: 11,480
Falkirk	Location of teams in 2022–23 Scottish League One		Edinburgh
Falkirk Stadium	Location of teams in 2022–23 Scottish League One		Meadowbank Stadium
Capacity: 7,937	Location of teams in 2022–23 Scottish League One		Capacity: 1,280
Kelty Hearts	Montrose	Peterhead	Queen of the South
New Central Park	Links Park	Balmoor	Palmerston Park
Capacity: 2,181	Capacity: 4,936	Capacity: 3,150	Capacity: 8,690

=== Personnel and kits ===
Team	Manager	Captain	Kit manufacturer	Shirt sponsor
Airdrieonians	(Scotland) Rhys McCabe	(Scotland) Callum Fordyce	Umbro	Holemasters
Alloa Athletic	(Scotland) Brian Rice	(Scotland) Andy Graham	Pendle	Northern Gas and Power
Clyde	(Scotland) Jim Duffy	(Northern Ireland) Brian McLean	Puma	HomesBook Factoring (Home); Whitemoss Dental (Away)
Dunfermline Athletic	(Northern Ireland) James McPake	(Scotland) Kyle Benedictus	Joma	SRJ Windows
Falkirk	(Scotland) John McGlynn	(Scotland) Stephen McGinn	Puma	Crunchy Carrots
Edinburgh	(Republic of Ireland) Alan Maybury	(Scotland) Robbie McIntyre	Joma	Forth Capital
Kelty Hearts	(Scotland) John Potter	(Scotland) Michael Tidser	Joma	The Conservatory Converters
Montrose	(Scotland) Stewart Petrie	(Scotland) Paul Watson	Hummel	Carnegie Fuels Ltd
Peterhead	(Scotland) Jordon Brown and (Scotland) Ryan Strachan	(Scotland) Paul Dixon	Adidas	The Score Group
Queen of the South	(England) Marvin Bartley	(England) Josh Todd	Macron	Rosefield Salvage

=== Managerial changes ===
Team	Outgoing manager	Manner of departure	Date of vacancy	Position in table	Incoming manager	Date of appointment
Falkirk	(Scotland) Kenny Miller	End of interim spell	30 April 2022	Pre-season	(Scotland) John McGlynn	4 May 2022
Edinburgh	(Republic of Ireland) Alan Maybury	End of interim spell	13 May 2022	Pre-season	(Republic of Ireland) Alan Maybury	19 May 2022
Dunfermline Athletic	(Scotland) John Hughes	Mutual consent	19 May 2022	Pre-season	(Northern Ireland) James McPake	24 May 2022
Airdrieonians	(Scotland) Ian Murray	Signed by Raith Rovers	24 May 2022	Pre-season	(Scotland) Rhys McCabe	26 May 2022
Kelty Hearts	(Scotland) Kevin Thomson	Resigned	31 May 2022	Pre-season	(Scotland) John Potter	8 June 2022
Clyde	(Scotland) Danny Lennon	Mutual consent	25 October 2022	9th	(Scotland) Jim Duffy	7 November 2022
Peterhead	(Scotland) Jim McInally	Resigned	14 November 2022	10th	(Scotland) David Robertson	29 November 2022
Queen of the South	(Scotland) Willie Gibson	Mutual consent	21 December 2022	7th	(England) Marvin Bartley	7 January 2023
Peterhead	(Scotland) David Robertson	Sacked	21 March 2023	10th	(Scotland) Jordon Brown and (Scotland) Ryan Strachan	21 March 2023

== League table ==
Pos	Team	Pld	W	D	L	GF	GA	GD	Pts	Promotion, qualification or relegation
1	Dunfermline Athletic (C, P)	36	23	12	1	63	21	+42	81	Promotion to the Championship
2	Falkirk	36	19	10	7	70	39	+31	67	Qualification for the Championship play-offs
3	Airdrieonians (O, P)	36	17	9	10	82	51	+31	60	Qualification for the Championship play-offs
4	Alloa Athletic	36	17	6	13	56	47	+9	57	Qualification for the Championship play-offs
5	Queen of the South	36	16	6	14	59	59	0	54	
6	Edinburgh	36	15	6	15	60	55	+5	51	
7	Montrose	36	13	9	14	50	55	−5	48	
8	Kelty Hearts	36	10	10	16	39	54	−15	40	
9	Clyde (R)	36	5	9	22	35	68	−33	24	Qualification for the League One play-offs
10	Peterhead (R)	36	3	7	26	19	84	−65	16	Relegation to League Two

Rules for classification: 1) Points; 2) Goal difference; 3) Goals scored; 4) Head-to-to head points; 5) Head-to-head goal difference; 6) Play-off (only for deciding promotion, play-off participation and relegation).
(C) Champions; (O) Play-off winners; (P) Promoted; (R) Relegated

== Results ==
=== Matches 1–18 ===
Teams play each other twice, once at home and once away.

Home \ Away	AIR	ALO	CLY	DNF	EDI	FAL	KEL	MON	PET	QOS
Airdrieonians	—	2–0	5–0	3–4	0–6	4–0	1–0	4–0	1–1	3–3
Alloa Athletic	2–0	—	2–1	0–3	2–4	1–1	3–1	2–1	5–0	5–1
Clyde	0–1	2–4	—	0–2	0–2	3–3	3–0	1–3	2–2	1–2
Dunfermline Athletic	1–1	1–0	2–2	—	1–0	1–1	2–1	1–0	2–2	1–1
Edinburgh	3–1	4–3	2–0	0–3	—	0–3	2–0	2–2	2–0	0–3
Falkirk	1–1	3–1	2–0	0–1	2–0	—	2–3	0–0	3–1	3–1
Kelty Hearts	1–0	1–1	2–1	0–0	0–2	2–0	—	1–3	3–0	1–0
Montrose	4–2	0–0	2–1	2–0	1–2	1–1	3–0	—	3–0	0–0
Peterhead	0–2	0–2	1–0	0–2	1–1	0–4	2–1	0–2	—	1–4
Queen of the South	1–1	1–1	1–4	0–2	4–1	1–3	1–2	4–0	2–0	—

Legend: Blue = home team win; Yellow = draw; Red = away team win.
For upcoming matches, an "a" indicates there is an article about the rivalry between the two participants.

=== Matches 19–36 ===
Teams play each other twice, once at home and once away.

Home \ Away	AIR	ALO	CLY	DNF	EDI	FAL	KEL	MON	PET	QOS
Airdrieonians	—	4–0	1–0	1–1	3–5	1–3	6–1	3–0	7–0	1–3
Alloa Athletic	0–1	—	3–1	0–2	2–1	1–4	0–0	1–0	1–0	1–2
Clyde	1–5	2–2	—	1–1	2–1	0–0	1–2	2–1	1–0	1–1
Dunfermline Athletic	1–1	2–0	2–1	—	0–0	2–0	0–0	2–0	4–0	5–0
Edinburgh	1–4	0–2	3–0	0–1	—	1–2	2–2	1–1	4–0	1–3
Falkirk	2–2	1–0	4–0	2–2	1–2	—	0–0	2–1	5–0	5–2
Kelty Hearts	1–1	0–1	0–0	1–2	1–2	1–2	—	1–2	2–1	3–0
Montrose	2–4	0–4	2–0	1–3	3–3	1–2	3–3	—	2–1	1–0
Peterhead	0–3	0–2	1–1	0–2	1–0	1–3	1–1	0–0	—	1–3
Queen of the South	3–2	1–2	1–0	0–2	1–0	1–0	4–1	2–3	2–1	—

Legend: Blue = home team win; Yellow = draw; Red = away team win.
For upcoming matches, an "a" indicates there is an article about the rivalry between the two participants.

== Season statistics ==
=== Scoring ===
==== Top scorers ====
Rank	Player	Club	Goals
1	(Scotland) Calum Gallagher	Airdrieonians	22
1	(Republic of Ireland) Ruari Paton	Queen of the South	22
3	(Scotland) Craig Wighton	Dunfermline Athletic	16
4	(England) Gabby McGill	Airdrieonians	15
5	(Republic of Ireland) Conor Sammon	Alloa Athletic	13
5	(Scotland) Danny Handling	Edinburgh	13
5	(Scotland) John Robertson	Edinburgh	13

== Awards ==
Month	Manager of the Month		Player of the Month	
Month	Manager	Club	Player	Club
August	(Scotland) Rhys McCabe	Airdrieonians	(Scotland) Calum Gallagher	Airdrieonians
September/October	(Northern Ireland) James McPake	Dunfermline Athletic	(Scotland) Danny Handling	Edinburgh
November	(Northern Ireland) James McPake	Dunfermline Athletic	(Scotland) Jordan Allan	Clyde
December	(Republic of Ireland) Alan Maybury	Edinburgh	(Scotland) John Robertson	Edinburgh
January	(Scotland) John McGlynn	Falkirk	(Scotland) Callumn Morrison	Falkirk
February	(Scotland) John McGlynn	Falkirk	(Scotland) Kyle Benedictus	Dunfermline Athletic
March	(England) Marvin Bartley	Queen of the South	(England) Gabby McGill	Airdrieonians
April	(Northern Ireland) James McPake	Dunfermline Athletic	(Scotland) Craig Wighton	Dunfermline Athletic

The SPFL League One manager of the year was James McPake of Dunfermline Athletic.

The SPFL League One player of the year was Kyle Benedictus of Dunfermline Athletic.

== League One play-offs ==
The semi-finals were contested by the teams placed second to fourth in League Two, as well as the team placed ninth in League One. The winners advanced to the final, with the highest-ranked team hosting the second leg.

=== Qualified teams ===
Team	Rank
Clyde	1
Dumbarton	2
Annan Athletic	3
East Fife	4

=== Semi-finals ===
==== First leg ====
9 May 2023	Annan Athletic	6–0	Dumbarton	Annan
19:45	Goss 7'; Kilsby 24'; Muir 40'; Smith 62'; Docherty 83'; Luissint 89'			Stadium: Galabank; Attendance: 840; Referee: Calum Scott

9 May 2023	East Fife	0–1	Clyde	Methil
20:00			Rennie 53'	Stadium: Bayview Stadium; Attendance: 1,206; Referee: Barry Cook

==== Second leg ====
12 May 2023	Clyde	1–1 (a.e.t.) (2–1 agg.)	East Fife	Hamilton
19:45	Rennie 107'		Shepherd 10'	Stadium: New Douglas Park; Attendance: 1,012; Referee: Craig Napier

13 May 2023	Dumbarton	0–0 (0–6 agg.)	Annan Athletic	Dumbarton
15:00				Stadium: Dumbarton Football Stadium; Attendance: 296; Referee: Ian Snedden

=== Final ===
==== First leg ====
16 May 2023	Annan Athletic	3–1	Clyde	Annan
19:35	Kilsby 18', 67'; Šuľa 82' (o.g.)		Cameron 33'	Stadium: Galabank; Attendance: 1,160; Referee: Graham Grainger

==== Second leg ====
19 May 2023	Clyde	1–2 (2–5 agg.)	Annan Athletic	Hamilton
19:35	McDonald 47'		Luissint 78', 90+3'	Stadium: New Douglas Park; Attendance: 1,202; Referee: Colin Steven
