= 2024–25 Dunfermline Athletic F.C. season =

Dunfermline Athletic
2024–25 season
- Chairman: David Cook
- Manager: James McPake (until 23 December); John McLaughlan (caretaker); Michael Tidser (17 January – 17 March); Neil Lennon (from 21 March)
- Stadium: East End Park; Dunfermline, Scotland (capacity: 11,480)
- Scottish Championship: Seventh place
- Scottish Cup: Fifth round
- League Cup: Group stage
- Challenge Cup: Semi-finals
- Top goalscorer: League: Chris Kane (11); All: Chris Kane (12)
- Highest home attendance: 8,558 vs. Falkirk, Championship, 27 December 2024
- Lowest home attendance: 1,011 vs. Cove Rangers, League Cup, 27 July 2024
- Average home league attendance: 5,575
Home colours	Away colours

The 2024–25 season was Dunfermline Athletic's second season back in the Scottish Championship, following their promotion from Scottish League One.

== Squad list ==
As of match played 2 May 2025

No.	Name	Nationality	Position	Date of birth (age)	Signed from	Signed in	Signed until	Apps.	Goals
Goalkeepers
1	Deniz Mehmet	(Turkey)	GK	19 September 1992 (age 32)	Dundee United	2021	2026	97	0
18	Lewis Briggs	(Scotland)	GK		Fife Elite Football Academy	-	-	0	0
21	Tobi Oluwayemi	(England)	GK	8 May 2003 (age 22)	Celtic	2024	2025	36	0
Defenders
2	Aaron Comrie	(Scotland)	DF	3 February 1997 (age 28)	St Johnstone	2019	2025	200	5
3	Kieran Ngwenya	(Malawi)	DF	25 September 2002 (age 22)	Aberdeen	2024	2026	33	0
4	Kyle Benedictus	(Scotland)	DF	7 December 1991 (age 33)	Raith Rovers	2022	2025	97	10
6	Ewan Otoo	(Scotland)	DF	30 August 2002 (age 23)	Celtic B	2023	2026	94	6
12	Rhys Breen	(Scotland)	DF	6 January 2000 (age 25)	Rangers	2021	2025	63	5
13	Andre Raymond	(Trinidad and Tobago)	DF	9 November 2000 (age 24)	St Johnstone	2025	2025	5	0
15	Sam Fisher	(Scotland)	DF	26 July 2001 (age 24)	Dundee	2022	2026	57	1
16	Tommy Fogarty	(Northern Ireland)	DF	9 June 2004 (age 21)	Birmingham City	2024	2025	20	0
25	Sam Young	(Scotland)	DF	16 January 2006 (age 19)	Fife Elite Football Academy	2021	2026	14	0
29	Liam Hoggan	(Scotland)	DF	18 September 2006 (age 18)	Fife Elite Football Academy	2021	2026	1	0
48	Jeremiah Chilokoa-Mullen	(Scotland)	DF	17 June 2004 (age 21)	Leeds United	2025	2025	15	0
Midfielders
5	Chris Hamilton	(Scotland)	MF	13 July 2001 (age 24)	Heart of Midlothian	2022	2025	111	5
7	Kane Ritchie-Hosler	(England)	MF	13 September 2002 (age 23)	Rangers	2023	2026	73	6
8	Joe Chalmers	(Scotland)	MF	3 January 1994 (age 31)	Ayr United	2022	2025	122	0
10	Matty Todd	(Scotland)	MF	14 June 2001 (age 24)	Fife Elite Football Academy	2018	2026	125	23
19	David Wotherspoon	(Canada)	MF	16 January 1990 (age 35)	Dundee United	2024	2025	36	1
22	Craig Clay	(England)	MF	5 May 1992 (age 33)	Sutton United	2024	2025	20	0
26	Andrew Tod	(Scotland)	MF	26 February 2006 (age 19)	Fife Elite Football Academy	2021	2026	21	0
28	Ewan McLeod	(Scotland)	MF	18 January 2006 (age 19)	Fife Elite Football Academy	2023	2026	2	0
33	Josh Cooper	(Scotland)	MF	10 December 2002 (age 22)	Greenock Morton	2024	2025	27	4
35	Tashan Oakley-Boothe	(England)	MF	14 February 2000 (age 25)	Estrela da Amadora	2025	2025	9	0
37	Owen Hampson	(Wales)	MF	17 November 2004 (age 20)	Sheffield United	2025	2025	3	0
44	Victor Wanyama	(Kenya)	MF	25 June 1991 (age 34)	CF Montréal	2025	2025	4	0
45	Omar Taylor-Clarke	(Wales)	MF	10 December 2003 (age 21)	Bristol City	2025	2025	3	0
Forwards
9	Craig Wighton	(Scotland)	FW	27 July 1997 (age 28)	Heart of Midlothian	2021	2025	113	33
11	Lewis McCann	(Northern Ireland)	FW	7 June 2001 (age 24)	Fife Elite Football Academy	2018	2026	161	29
14	Archie Stevens	(England)	FW	11 January 2006 (age 19)	Rangers	2025	2025	11	0
17	Connor Young	(Scotland)	FW	1 August 2004 (age 21)	Edinburgh City	2025	2027	8	0
20	Chris Kane	(Scotland)	FW	5 September 1994 (age 31)	St Johnstone	2024	2026	42	17
23	Michael O'Halloran	(Scotland)	FW	6 January 1991 (age 34)	St Johnstone	2023	2025	36	1
24	Taylor Sutherland	(Scotland)	FW	12 December 2005 (age 19)	Fife Elite Football Academy	2022	2026	31	4
29	Jake Sutherland	(Scotland)	FW	6 November 2006 (age 18)	Fife Elite Football Academy	2023	2026	1	0
34	Ephraim Yeboah	(Italy)	FW	12 July 2006 (age 19)	Bristol City	2025	2025	16	0
62	Dapo Mebude	(Scotland)	FW	21 July 2001 (age 24)	K.V. Oostende	2024	2025	18	1

== Results and fixtures ==
=== Pre-season ===
28 June 2024 Friendly	East Fife	2 – 0	Dunfermline Athletic	Methil, Scotland
19:30	Millar 36'; Shepherd 62'	Report		Stadium: Bayview Stadium

2 July 2024 Friendly	Cove Rangers	1 – 1	Dunfermline Athletic	Cove Bay, Scotland
19:30	Scully 67'	Report	McCann 90'	Stadium: Balmoral Stadium

6 July 2024 Friendly	Dunfermline Athletic	0 – 1	St Mirren	Dunfermline, Scotland
15:00			Olusanya 28'	Stadium: East End Park; Attendance: 1,148; Referee: Jordan Curran

10 July 2024 Friendly	Dunfermline Athletic	0 – 2	Dundee	Dunfermline, Scotland
19:30		Report	Portales 33'; Main 39'	Stadium: East End Park; Attendance: 893

=== Scottish Championship ===
3 August 2024 1	Livingston	2 – 0	Dunfermline Athletic	Livingston, Scotland
15:00	Pittman 49'; Kelly 71'	Report		Stadium: Almondvale Stadium; Attendance: 917; Referee: Craig Napier

10 August 2024 2	Dunfermline Athletic	0 – 2	Falkirk	Dunfermline, Scotland
15:00		Report	MacIver 6'; Morrison 87' (pen.)	Stadium: East End Park; Attendance: 7,595; Referee: Matthew MacDermid

24 August 2024 3	Hamilton Academical	1 – 0	Dunfermline Athletic	Hamilton, Scotland
15:00	Tumilty 26'	Report		Stadium: New Douglas Park; Attendance: 2,022; Referee: Calum Scott

31 August 2024 4	Dunfermline Athletic	1 – 1	Ayr United	Dunfermline, Scotland
15:00	Otoo 15'	Report	Watret 22'	Stadium: East End Park; Attendance: 4,921; Referee: Ross Hardie

13 September 2024 5	Dunfermline Athletic	2 – 0	Raith Rovers	Dunfermline, Scotland
19:45	Otoo 52'; Wotherspoon 80'	Report	Murray (red card) 15'	Stadium: East End Park; Attendance: 6,993; Referee: Craig Napier

21 September 2024 6	Partick Thistle	1 – 0	Dunfermline Athletic	Glasgow, Scotland
15:00	Fitzpatrick 88'	Report		Stadium: Firhill Stadium; Attendance: 4,301; Referee: Euan Anderson

28 September 2024 7	Dunfermline Athletic	1 – 2	Queen's Park	Dunfermline, Scotland
15:00	Cooper 78'	Report	Rudden 15'; Welsh 61'	Stadium: East End Park; Attendance: 4,494; Referee: Duncan Nicolson

5 October 2024 8	Airdrieonians	1 – 1	Dunfermline Athletic	Airdrie, Scotland
15:00	Hancock 67'	Report	Kane 28' (pen.)	Stadium: Excelsior Stadium; Referee: Peter Stuart

19 October 2024 9	Dunfermline Athletic	0 – 0	Greenock Morton	Dunfermline, Scotland
15:00		Report		Stadium: East End Park; Attendance: 4,645; Referee: Ryan Lee

26 October 2024 10	Falkirk	2 – 1	Dunfermline Athletic	Falkirk, Scotland
15:00	Hamilton 24' (o.g.); Miller 57'	Report	McCann 72'	Stadium: Falkirk Stadium; Attendance: 7,321; Referee: Chris Graham

29 October 2024 11	Dunfermline Athletic	3 – 0	Greenock Morton	Dunfermline, Scotland
15:00	Kane 7', 71'; Benedictus 56'	Report		Stadium: East End Park; Attendance: 4,810; Referee: Dan McFarlane

2 November 2024 12	Dunfermline Athletic	0 – 1	Partick Thistle	Dunfermline, Scotland
15:00		Report	Robinson 57'	Stadium: East End Park; Attendance: 5,162; Referee: Matthew MacDermid

9 November 2024 13	Queen's Park	2 – 1	Dunfermline Athletic	Glasgow, Scotland
15:00	Duncan 31'; Turner 72'	Report	M.Todd 61'	Stadium: Hampden Park; Attendance: 1,331; Referee: Graham Grainger

16 November 2024 14	Dunfermline Athletic	1 – 0	Airdrieonians	Dunfermline, Scotland
15:00	McCann 61'	Report		Stadium: East End Park; Attendance: 4,583; Referee: Colin Steven

23 November 2024 15	Ayr United	1 – 0	Dunfermline Athletic	Ayr, Scotland
15:00	Henderson 67'	Report		Stadium: Somerset Park; Attendance: 1,701; Referee: Craig Napier

7 December 2024 16	Dunfermline Athletic	3 – 2	Hamilton Academical	Dunfermline, Scotland
15:00	M.Todd 56'; Cooper 83', 88'	Report	McGinty 74'; Shaw 90+3' (pen.)	Stadium: East End Park; Attendance: 4,286; Referee: Iain Snedden

14 December 2024 17	Raith Rovers	2 – 0	Dunfermline Athletic	Kirkcaldy, Scotland
15:00	Easton 42'; David 74'	Report		Stadium: Stark's Park; Attendance: 5,542; Referee: Calum Scott

21 December 2024 18	Greenock Morton	2 – 0	Dunfermline Athletic	Greenock, Scotland
15:00	Boyes 22'; Blues 47'	Report	Wotherspoon (red card) 50'	Stadium: Cappielow; Attendance: 1,722; Referee: Dan McFarlane

27 December 2024 19	Dunfermline Athletic	3 – 3	Falkirk	Dunfermline, Scotland
19:45	Kane 25' (pen.); M.Todd 63' (pen.); Benedictus 90+2'	Report	Morrison 24'; Nesbitt 54'; Henderson 87'	Stadium: East End Park; Attendance: 8,558; Referee: Colin Steven

4 January 2025 20	Partick Thistle	1 – 4	Dunfermline Athletic	Glasgow, Scotland
15:00	Chalmers 6'	Report	McCann 4'; Megwa 35' (o.g.); Kane 45+2'; Cooper 82'	Stadium: Firhill Stadium; Attendance: 3,938; Referee: Steven Kirkland

14 January 2025 21	Dunfermline Athletic	0 – 2	Ayr United	Dunfermline, Scotland
19:45		Report	Henderson 61'; Oakley 71'	Stadium: East End Park; Attendance: 4,634; Referee: Nick Walsh

25 January 2025 22	Airdrieonians	3 – 0	Dunfermline Athletic	Airdrie, Scotland
15:00	McGrattan 14'; Mochrie 45+3'; Wilson 57'	Report		Stadium: Excelsior Stadium; Attendance: 1,865; Referee: Duncan Williams

1 February 2025 23	Dunfermline Athletic	3 – 1	Raith Rovers	Dunfermline, Scotland
15:00	Kane 51 pen.', 65', 76 pen.'	Report	Easton 43 pen.'	Stadium: East End Park; Attendance: 6,812; Referee: Grant Irvine

15 February 2025 24	Livingston	0 – 0	Dunfermline Athletic	Livingston, Scotland
15:00		Report		Stadium: Almondvale Stadium; Attendance: 1,798; Referee: Duncan Nicolson

22 February 2025 25	Dunfermline Athletic	0 – 0	Queen's Park	Dunfermline, Scotland
15:00		Report		Stadium: East End Park; Attendance: 4,527; Referee: Euan Anderson

25 February 2025 26	Hamilton Academical	1 – 0	Dunfermline Athletic	Hamilton, Scotland
19:45	McKinstry 63'	Report		Stadium: New Douglas Park; Attendance: 1,098; Referee: Chris Graham

1 March 2025 27	Dunfermline Athletic	2 – 1	Greenock Morton	Dunfermline, Scotland
15:00	Kane 60', 79'; Benedictus (red card) 67'	Report	Moffat 33'	Stadium: East End Park; Attendance: 4,620; Referee: Duncan Williams

8 March 2025 28	Falkirk	1 – 0	Dunfermline Athletic	Falkirk, Scotland
15:00	Spencer 6'	Report		Stadium: Falkirk Stadium; Attendance: 7,106; Referee: Calum Scott

14 March 2025 29	Raith Rovers	2 – 0	Dunfermline Athletic	Kirkcaldy, Scotland
19:45	Pollock 22'; Hanlon 56'	Report		Stadium: Stark's Park; Attendance: 5,586; Referee: Ross Hardie

29 March 2025 30	Ayr United	3 – 0	Dunfermline Athletic	Ayr, Scotland
15:00	McLennan 43'; Murphy 68'; Walker 90+4'	Report	Wanyama (red card) 84'	Stadium: Somerset Park; Attendance: 3,253; Referee: Iain Snedden

2 April 2025 31	Dunfermline Athletic	1 – 0	Livingston	Dunfermline, Scotland
19:45	Otoo 45'	Report		Stadium: East End Park; Attendance: 4,890; Referee: Grant Irvine

5 April 2025 32	Dunfermline Athletic	0 – 1	Hamilton Academical	Dunfermline, Scotland
15:00		Report	Tumilty 41'	Stadium: East End Park; Attendance: 7,636; Referee: Euan Anderson

12 April 2025 33	Queen's Park	0 – 1	Dunfermline Athletic	Glasgow, Scotland
15:00		Report	Kane 69'	Stadium: Hampden Park; Attendance: 1,705; Referee: David Dickinson

19 April 2025 34	Dunfermline Athletic	0 – 0	Partick Thistle	Dunfermline, Scotland
15:00		Report		Stadium: East End Park; Attendance: 5,688; Referee: Nick Walsh

26 April 2025 35	Dunfermline Athletic	0 – 0	Airdrieonians	Dunfermline, Scotland
15:00		Report		Stadium: East End Park; Attendance: 5,504; Referee: Lloyd Wilson

2 May 2025 36	Greenock Morton	2 – 0	Dunfermline Athletic	Greenock, Scotland
19:45	Moffat 3'; Gillespie 7 pen.'	Report		Stadium: Cappielow; Attendance: 2,849; Referee: Alastair Grieve

=== Scottish League Cup ===
==== Group stage ====
13 July 2024 1	The Spartans	0 – 3	Dunfermline Athletic	Edinburgh, Scotland
15:00		Report	McCann 4'; Ritchie-Hosler 82'; T. Sutherland 87'	Stadium: Ainslie Park; Referee: Ian Hart

16 July 2024 2	Dunfermline Athletic	0 – 2	Forfar Athletic	Dunfermline, Scotland
19:45		Report	MacLean 28'; Whatley 52'	Stadium: East End Park; Attendance: 1,358; Referee: Colin Whyte

20 July 2024 3	Livingston	1 – 0	Dunfermline Athletic	Livingston, Scotland
15:00	Muirhead 11'	Report		Stadium: Almondvale Stadium; Attendance: 1,555; Referee: Colin Steven

27 July 2024 4	Dunfermline Athletic	1 – 2	Cove Rangers	Dunfermline, Scotland
15:00	T. Sutherland 88'	Report	Doyle 58'; Gaffney 84'	Stadium: East End Park; Attendance: 1,011; Referee: Calum Scott

=== Scottish Challenge Cup ===
7 September 2024 Third round	East Fife	0 – 2	Dunfermline Athletic	Methil
15:00		Report	Comrie 53'; McCann 58'	Stadium: Bayview Stadium; Attendance: 1,264; Referee: Iain Snedden

12 October 2024 Fourth round	Dunfermline Athletic	2 – 1	Kelty Hearts	Dunfermline
15:00	Kane 23'; M.Todd 32'	Report	Johnston 15'	Stadium: East End Park; Attendance: 1,821; Referee: Graham Grainger

12 November 2024 Quarter-finals	Dunfermline Athletic	1 – 0	Alloa Athletic	Dunfermline
19:45	McCann 37'	Report		Stadium: East End Park; Attendance: 1,400; Referee: Duncan Williams

5 February 2025 Semi-finals	Dunfermline Athletic	0 – 2	Livingston	Dunfermline
19:35		Report	Muirhead 41'; Yengi 89'	Stadium: East End Park; Attendance: 2,072; Referee: Duncan Williams

=== Scottish Cup ===
30 November 2024 Third round	Edinburgh City	1 – 2	Dunfermline Athletic	Edinburgh
15:00	Young 90+3' (pen.)	Report	Mebude 5'; M.Todd 72'	Stadium: Meadowbank Stadium; Attendance: 696; Referee: Duncan Williams

18 January 2025 Fourth round	Dunfermline Athletic	3 – 0	Stenhousemuir	Dunfermline
15:00	Chris Hamilton 16'; Otoo 41'; Lewis McCann 46'	Report		Stadium: East End Park; Attendance: 2,353; Referee: Peter Stuart

9 February 2024 Fifth round	Aberdeen	3 – 0	Dunfermline Athletic	Aberdeen
12:30	Guèye 45+1'; Jensen 50'; Nisbet 85'	Report		Stadium: Pittodrie Stadium; Attendance: 9,893; Referee: Steven McLean

== Squad statistics ==
=== Appearances and goals ===
As of match played 2 May 2025

No.	Pos	Nat	Player	Total		Scottish Championship		League Cup		Challenge Cup		Scottish Cup	
No.	Pos	Nat	Player	Apps	Goals	Apps	Goals	Apps	Goals	Apps	Goals	Apps	Goals
1	GK	(Turkey) TUR	Deniz Mehmet	11	0	5+1	0	4	0	1	0	0	0
2	DF	(Scotland) SCO	Aaron Comrie	43	1	32	0	4	0	4	1	3	0
3	DF	(Malawi) MWI	Kieran Ngwenya	34	0	23+3	0	4	0	2	0	1+1	0
4	DF	(Scotland) SCO	Kyle Benedictus	38	2	30	2	3	0	2	0	3	0
5	MF	(Scotland) SCO	Chris Hamilton	43	1	25+7	0	4	0	4	0	2+1	1
6	DF	(Scotland) SCO	Ewan Otoo	47	4	34+2	3	3+1	0	4	0	3	1
7	MF	(England) ENG	Kane Ritchie-Hosler	36	1	19+6	0	4	1	4	0	2+1	0
8	MF	(Scotland) SCO	Joe Chalmers	22	0	10+2	0	2+2	0	3	0	3	0
10	MF	(Scotland) SCO	Matty Todd	27	5	17+7	3	0	0	1+1	1	1	1
11	FW	(Northern Ireland) NIR	Lewis McCann	39	7	29+1	3	3+1	1	3	2	2	1
13	DF	(Trinidad and Tobago) TRI	Andre Raymond	5	0	4+1	0	0	0	0	0	0	0
14	FW	(England) ENG	Archie Stevens	11	0	7+3	0	0	0	0	0	1	0
16	DF	(Northern Ireland) NIR	Tommy Fogarty	19	0	16+2	0	0	0	0	0	1	0
17	FW	(Scotland) SCO	Connor Young	8	0	4+4	0	0	0	0	0	0	0
18	GK	(Scotland) SCO	Lewis Briggs	0	0	0	0	0	0	0	0	0	0
19	MF	(Canada) CAN	David Wotherspoon	37	1	15+12	1	4	0	0+3	0	3	0
20	FW	(Scotland) SCO	Chris Kane	33	12	24+3	11	0+1	0	3	1	2	0
21	GK	(England) ENG	Tobi Oluwayemi	36	0	30	0	0	0	3	0	3	0
22	MF	(England) ENG	Craig Clay	20	0	13+5	0	0	0	1	0	0+1	0
23	FW	(Scotland) SCO	Michael O'Halloran	10	0	1+4	0	1+1	0	0+1	0	0+2	0
25	MF	(Scotland) SCO	Sam Young	13	0	9+2	0	0	0	2	0	0	0
26	MF	(Scotland) SCO	Andrew Tod	7	0	0+2	0	0+4	0	0+1	0	0	0
33	MF	(Scotland) SCO	Josh Cooper	28	4	4+20	4	0	0	1+1	0	1+1	0
34	FW	(Italy) ITA	Ephraim Yeboah	16	0	7+7	0	0	0	1	0	0+1	0
35	MF	(England) ENG	Tashan Oakley-Boothe	9	0	7+2	0	0	0	0	0	0	0
37	MF	(Wales) WAL	Owen Hampson	3	0	0+2	0	0	0	0	0	0+1	0
44	MF	(Kenya) KEN	Victor Wanyama	4	0	1+3	0	0	0	0	0	0	0
45	MF	(Wales) WAL	Omar Taylor-Clarke	3	0	0+2	0	0	0	1	0	0	0
48	DF	(Scotland) SCO	Jeremiah Chilokoa-Mullen	15	0	13	0	0	0	1	0	1	0
Players who left during the season:
9	FW	(Scotland) SCO	Craig Wighton	19	0	4+9	0	1+1	0	1+2	0	0+1	0
12	DF	(Scotland) SCO	Rhys Breen	4	0	0+1	0	2+1	0	0	0	0	0
15	DF	(Scotland) SCO	Sam Fisher	11	0	3+2	0	4	0	1+1	0	0	0
24	FW	(Scotland) SCO	Taylor Sutherland	19	2	2+10	0	1+3	2	0+2	0	0+1	0
27	DF	(Scotland) SCO	Liam Hoggan	0	0	0	0	0	0	0	0	0	0
28	MF	(Scotland) SCO	Ewan McLeod	1	0	0	0	0+1	0	0	0	0	0
29	FW	(Scotland) SCO	Jake Sutherland	0	0	0	0	0	0	0	0	0	0
30	MF	(Scotland) SCO	Freddie Rowe	1	0	0	0	0+1	0	0	0	0	0
62	FW	(Scotland) SCO	Dapo Mebude	18	1	5+9	0	0	0	2	0	1+1	1

=== Goalscorers ===
As of match played 2 May 2025

Ranking	Position	Nation	Name	Total	Scottish Championship	Scottish League Cup	Scottish Challenge Cup	Scottish Cup
1	FW	(Scotland)	Chris Kane	12	11		1	
2	FW	(Northern Ireland)	Lewis McCann	7	3	1	2	1
3	MF	(Scotland)	Matty Todd	5	3		1	1
4	DF	(England)	Ewan Otoo	4	3			1
5	MF	(Scotland)	Josh Cooper	3	3			
6	DF	(Scotland)	Kyle Benedictus	2	2			
6	DF	(Scotland)	Aaron Comrie	2	1		1	
6	FW	(Scotland)	Taylor Sutherland	2		2		
6	MF	(Scotland)	Chris Hamilton	1				1
6	FW	(Scotland)	Dapo Mebude	1				1
6	MF	(England)	Kane Ritchie-Hosler	1		1		
6	MF	(Canada)	David Wotherspoon	1	1			
Total				41	27	4	5	5

=== Disciplinary record ===
As of match played 2 May 2025

Squad number	Position	Nation	Name	Total		Scottish Championship		Scottish League Cup		Scottish Challenge Cup		Scottish Cup	
Squad number	Position	Nation	Name	Booked	Sent off (straight red)	Booked	Sent off (straight red)	Booked	Sent off (straight red)	Booked	Sent off (straight red)	Booked	Sent off (straight red)
2	DF	(Scotland)	Aaron Comrie	4		4							
3	DF	(Malawi)	Kieran Ngwenya	2		2							
4	DF	(Scotland)	Kyle Benedictus	4	1	3	1	1					
5	MF	(Scotland)	Chris Hamilton	14		11		1		1		1	
6	DF	(Scotland)	Ewan Otoo	7		7							
7	MF	(England)	Kane Ritchie-Hosler	3		3							
8	MF	(Scotland)	Joe Chalmers	3		3							
10	MF	(Scotland)	Matty Todd	1		1							
11	FW	(Northern Ireland)	Lewis McCann	5		5							
13	DF	(Trinidad and Tobago)	Andre Raymond	1		1							
15	DF	(Scotland)	Sam Fisher	1		1							
16	DF	(Northern Ireland)	Tommy Fogarty	5		5							
19	MF	(Canada)	David Wotherspoon	7	1	6	1					1	
20	FW	(Scotland)	Chris Kane	4		4							
21	GK	(England)	Tobi Oluwayemi	2		2						1	
22	MF	(England)	Craig Clay	4		4							
24	FW	(Scotland)	Taylor Sutherland	1				1					
25	DF	(Scotland)	Sam Young	2		1				1			
34	FW	(Italy)	Ephraim Yeboah	1		1							
35	MF	(England)	Tashan Oakley-Boothe	2		2							
44	MF	(Kenya)	Victor Wanyama	1	1	1	1						
48	DF	(Scotland)	Jeremiah Chilokoa-Mullen	5		5							
62	FW	(Scotland)	Dapo Mebude	1								1	
Total				80	3	71	3	3	0	2	0	4	0

== Club statistics ==
=== League table ===
Pos	Team	Pld	W	D	L	GF	GA	GD	Pts	Promotion, qualification or relegation
5	Raith Rovers	36	15	8	13	47	43	+4	53	
6	Greenock Morton	36	12	12	12	42	48	−6	48	
7	Dunfermline Athletic	36	9	8	19	28	43	−15	35	
8	Queen's Park	36	9	8	19	36	55	−19	35	
9	Airdrieonians (O)	36	7	8	21	34	62	−28	29	Qualification for the Championship play-offs

Rules for classification: 1) Points; 2) Goal difference; 3) Goals scored; 4) Head-to-to head points; 5) Head-to-head goal difference; 6) Play-off (only for deciding promotion, play-off participation and relegation).
(O) Play-off winners

=== League cup table ===
Pos	Team	Pld	W	PW	PL	L	GF	GA	GD	Pts	Qualification	SPA	LIV	FOR	DNF	COV
1	The Spartans	4	3	0	0	1	7	3	+4	9	Qualification for the second round	—	—	1–0	0–3	—
2	Livingston	4	3	0	0	1	5	1	+4	9		0–1	—	—	1–0	—
3	Forfar Athletic	4	2	0	0	2	5	3	+2	6		—	0–2	—	—	3–0 (Note: Forfar Athletic were awarded a technical 3−0 win over Cove, who fielded an ineligible player. The match had originally finished 1–1, with Forfar securing the bonus point following a 3–1 win on penalties.)
4	Dunfermline Athletic	4	1	0	0	3	4	5	−1	3		—	—	0–2	—	1–2
5	Cove Rangers	4	1	0	0	3	2	11	−9	3		0–5	0–2	—	—	—

Rules for classification: 1) goal difference, 2) goals scored, 3) away goals scored, 4) matches won, 5) away matches won, 6) drawing of lots.

== Transfers ==
=== Players in ===
Date	Position	No.	Nationality	Name	From	Fee	Ref.
22 May 2024	FW	20	(Scotland)	Chris Kane	St Johnstone	Free	
27 June 2024	DF	3	(Malawi)	Kieran Ngwenya	Aberdeen	Free	
3 July 2024	MF	19	(Canada)	David Wotherspoon	Dundee United	Free	
23 August 2024	MF	33	(Scotland)	Josh Cooper	Greenock Morton	Free	
20 September 2024	MF	22	(England)	Craig Clay	Sutton United	Free	
2 October 2024	FW	62	(Scotland)	Dapo Mebude	K.V. Oostende	Free	
24 January 2025	FW	17	(Scotland)	Connor Young	Edinburgh City	Undisclosed	
3 February 2025	DF		(Scotland)	Keith Bray	Inverness CT	Undisclosed	
3 February 2025	DF	48	(Scotland)	Jeremiah Chilokoa-Mullen	Leeds United	Free	
3 February 2025	MF	45	(Wales)	Omar Taylor-Clarke	Bristol City	Free	
13 February 2025	MF	35	(England)	Tashan Oakley-Boothe	Estrela da Amadora	Free	
26 March 2025	MF	44	(Kenya)	Victor Wanyama	CF Montréal	Free	

=== Players out ===
Date	Position	No.	Nationality	Name	To	Fee	Ref.
21 May 2024	FW	14	(Scotland)	Alex Jakubiak		Free	
21 May 2024	MF	18	(Scotland)	Paul Allan	Inverness Caledonian Thistle	Free	
21 May 2024	DF	19	(Scotland)	Miller Fenton		Free	
21 May 2024	MF	24	(Scotland)	Jake Rennie	Edinburgh City	Free	
21 May 2024	MF	25	(Scotland)	Michael Beagley	Gala Fairydean Rovers	Free	
21 May 2024	GK	44	(England)	Max Little	Coleraine	Free	
19 June 2024	DF	3	(Scotland)	Josh Edwards	Charlton Athletic	Undisclosed	

=== Loans in ===
Date	Position	No.	Nationality	Name	From	Duration	Ref.
22 August 2024	GK	21	(England)	Tobi Oluwayemi	Celtic	31 May 2025	
25 August 2024	DF	16	(Northern Ireland)	Tommy Fogarty	Birmingham City	31 May 2025	
31 January 2025	FW	34	(Italy)	Ephraim Yeboah	Bristol City	31 May 2025	
31 January 2025	FW	14	(England)	Archie Stevens	Rangers	31 May 2025	
3 February 2025	MF	37	(Wales)	Owen Hampson	Sheffield United	31 May 2025	
28 February 2025	DF	13	(Trinidad and Tobago)	Andre Raymond	St Johnstone	31 May 2025	

=== Loans out ===
Date	Position	No.	Nationality	Name	To	Duration	Ref.
19 July 2024	FW	29	(Scotland)	Jake Sutherland	Cowdenbeath	31 May 2025	
7 August 2024	DF	27	(Scotland)	Liam Hoggan	Gala Fairydean Rovers	31 May 2025	
4 September 2024	MF	30	(Scotland)	Freddie Rowe	St Andrews United	31 May 2025	
11 September 2024	MF	28	(Scotland)	Ewan McLeod	Civil Service Strollers	31 May 2025	
20 September 2024	MF	26	(Scotland)	Andrew Tod	East Fife	31 May 2025	
20 September 2024	DF	12	(Scotland)	Rhys Breen	Annan Athletic	31 May 2025	
3 October 2024	DF	31	(Scotland)	John Tod	St Andrews United	31 May 2025	
31 January 2025	FW	24	(Scotland)	Taylor Sutherland	Clyde	31 May 2025	
3 February 2025	DF		(Scotland)	Keith Bray	Inverness CT	31 May 2025	
3 February 2025	DF	15	(Scotland)	Sam Fisher	Stenhousemuir	31 May 2025	
6 February 2025	FW	9	(Scotland)	Craig Wighton	Montrose	31 May 2025	
25 February 2025	FW	62	(Scotland)	Dapo Mebude	Septemvri	31 May 2025	
