= 2022–23 Celtic F.C. season =

Celtic F.C.
2022–23 season
- Chairman: Ian Bankier (until 1 January 2023); Peter Lawwell (from 1 January 2023)
- Manager: Ange Postecoglou
- Stadium: Celtic Park
- Premiership: 1st
- Scottish Cup: Winners
- League Cup: Winners
- Champions League: Group stage
- Top goalscorer: League: Kyogo Furuhashi (27); All: Kyogo Furuhashi (34)
| Home colours | Away colours | Third colours |

The 2022–23 season was Celtic's 129th season of competitive football.

== Pre-season and friendlies ==
Celtic held a pre-season training camp in Bad Erlach (Austria), where they played friendlies against Wiener Viktoria and Rapid Wien. The camp ended with a trip across the border to face Baník Ostrava in a match celebrating the Czechs' centenary year. On Celtic's return to Glasgow, they played Blackburn Rovers. A trip to Poland followed, where they faced Legia Warsaw in a match honouring the career of former Celtic goalkeeper Artur Boruc. Celtic's pre-season schedule concluded with Norwich City's visit to Celtic Park.

| 6 July 2022 Friendly | Wiener Viktoria | 0–7 | Celtic | Bad Erlach, Austria |
| 17:30 BST | | Celtic Report | Kenny 9', 25'; Hatate 12'; Johnston 17'; Jullien 42'; Forrest 43'; Vata 76' | Stadium: Sportplatz |

| 9 July 2022 Friendly | Rapid Wien | 3–3 | Celtic | Vienna, Austria |
| 17:00 BST | Zimmermann 29'; Kriwak 62'; Aiwu 90' | Celtic Report | O'Riley 9'; Turnbull 55'; Furuhashi 64' | Stadium: Allianz Stadion |

| 13 July 2022 Friendly | Baník Ostrava | 2–4 | Celtic | Ostrava, Czech Republic |
| 17:00 BST | Šehić 7'; Tijani 71' | Celtic Report | Furuhashi 13'; O'Riley 24'; Giakoumakis 48'; Abada 74' | Stadium: Městský stadion |

| 16 July 2022 Friendly | Celtic | 2–2 | Blackburn Rovers | Glasgow |
| 12:30 BST | Jota 16'; Turnbull 27' | Celtic Report | Gallagher 1'; Brereton Díaz 76' | Stadium: Celtic Park |

| 20 July 2022 Friendly | Legia Warsaw | 2–2 | Celtic | Warsaw, Poland |
| 17:00 BST | Rosołek 46'; Josué 66' | Celtic Report | Hatate 20'; Maeda 43' | Stadium: Stadion Wojska Polskiego |

| 23 July 2022 Friendly | Celtic | 2–0 | Norwich City | Glasgow |
| 15:00 BST | Maeda 35'; Turnbull 67' | Celtic Report | | Stadium: Celtic Park |

=== Sydney Super Cup ===
In November 2022, Celtic travelled to Australia to participate in the inaugural Sydney Super Cup, where they faced Sydney FC and Everton.

| 17 November 2022 Friendly | Celtic | 1–2 | Sydney FC | Sydney, Australia |
| 08:45 GMT | Furuhashi 23' | Celtic Report | Mak 25'; Burgess 60' | Stadium: Sydney Football Stadium |

| 20 November 2022 Friendly | Everton | 0–0 (4–2 p) | Celtic | Sydney, Australia |
| 03:45 GMT | | Celtic Report | | Stadium: Stadium Australia |

== Scottish Premiership ==
The Scottish Premiership fixture list was announced on 17 June 2022. Celtic began their title defence against Aberdeen at Celtic Park.

| 31 July 2022 | Celtic | 2–0 | Aberdeen | Glasgow |
| 16:30 BST | Welsh 3'; Jota 75' | BBC Sport; Celtic Report | | Stadium: Celtic Park; Attendance: 58,824; Referee: Nick Walsh |

| 6 August 2022 | Ross County | 1–3 | Celtic | Dingwall |
| 15:00 BST | Iacovitti 58' | BBC Sport; Celtic Report | Furuhashi 48'; Jenz 84'; Abada 90+1' | Stadium: Victoria Park; Attendance: 5,502; Referee: Don Robertson |

| 14 August 2022 | Kilmarnock | 0–5 | Celtic | Kilmarnock |
| 12:00 BST | | BBC Sport; Celtic Report | Furuhashi 7'; Jota 35'; Jenz 45+1'; Starfelt 76'; Giakoumakis 82' | Stadium: Rugby Park; Attendance: 9,162; Referee: David Dickinson |

| 21 August 2022 | Celtic | 2–0 | Heart of Midlothian | Glasgow |
| 15:00 BST | Furuhashi 13'; Giakoumakis 90+4' | BBC Sport; Celtic Report | | Stadium: Celtic Park; Attendance: 58,776; Referee: Kevin Clancy |

| 28 August 2022 | Dundee United | 0–9 | Celtic | Dundee |
| 12:00 BST | | BBC Sport; Celtic Report | Furuhashi 15', 40', 45+2'; Jota 45+6'; Abada 50', 59', 77'; Juranović 55'; Starfelt 81' | Stadium: Tannadice Park; Attendance: 11,087; Referee: Steven McLean |

| 3 September 2022 | Celtic | 4–0 | Rangers | Glasgow |
| 12:30 BST | Abada 8', 40'; Jota 32'; Turnbull 78' | BBC Sport; Celtic Report | | Stadium: Celtic Park; Attendance: 58,636; Referee: Nick Walsh |

| 18 September 2022 | St Mirren | 2–0 | Celtic | Paisley |
| 12:00 BST | O'Hara 43'; Ayunga 53' | BBC Sport; Celtic Report | | Stadium: St Mirren Park; Attendance: 6,331; Referee: Don Robertson |

| 1 October 2022 | Celtic | 2–1 | Motherwell | Glasgow |
| 15:00 BST | Furuhashi 15'; Hatate 64' | BBC Sport; Celtic Report | Juranović 36' (o.g.) | Stadium: Celtic Park; Attendance: 58,407; Referee: John Beaton |

| 8 October 2022 | St Johnstone | 1–2 | Celtic | Perth |
| 12:30 BST | Mitchell 90+3' | BBC Sport; Celtic Report | Considine 42' (o.g.); Giakoumakis 90+5' | Stadium: McDiarmid Park; Attendance: 7,093; Referee: Euan Anderson |

| 15 October 2022 | Celtic | 6–1 | Hibernian | Glasgow |
| 15:00 BST | Forrest 9', 24', 58'; Giakoumakis 18', 73'; Maeda 89' | BBC Sport; Celtic Report | Youan 56' | Stadium: Celtic Park; Attendance: 58,969; Referee: Steven McLean |

| 22 October 2022 | Heart of Midlothian | 3–4 | Celtic | Edinburgh |
| 12:30 BST | Shankland 45+3' (pen.), 47', 65' (pen.) | BBC Sport; Celtic Report | Forrest 14'; Giakoumakis 55'; Maeda 59'; Taylor 76' | Stadium: Tynecastle Park; Attendance: 18,081; Referee: Nick Walsh |

| 30 October 2022 | Livingston | 0–3 | Celtic | Livingston |
| 12:00 GMT | | BBC Sport; Celtic Report | Furuhashi 9'; Taylor 53'; Jota 87' | Stadium: Almondvale Stadium; Attendance: 8,825; Referee: Willie Collum |

| 5 November 2022 | Celtic | 4–2 | Dundee United | Glasgow |
| 15:00 GMT | Hakšabanović 6', 34'; Furuhashi 90'; Abada 90+2' | BBC Sport; Celtic Report | Fletcher 12' (pen.); Levitt 87' | Stadium: Celtic Park; Attendance: 58,696; Referee: David Dickinson |

| 9 November 2022 | Motherwell | 1–2 | Celtic | Motherwell |
| 19:45 GMT | Tierney 86' | BBC Sport; Celtic Report | Furuhashi 15'; Maeda 84' | Stadium: Fir Park; Attendance: 8,315; Referee: Willie Collum |

| 12 November 2022 | Celtic | 2–1 | Ross County | Glasgow |
| 15:00 GMT | Turnbull 62'; Hakšabanović 68' | BBC Sport; Celtic Report | Cancola 50' (pen.) | Stadium: Celtic Park; Attendance: 58,391; Referee: David Munro |

| 17 December 2022 | Aberdeen | 0–1 | Celtic | Aberdeen |
| 12:30 GMT | | BBC Sport; Celtic Report | McGregor 87' | Stadium: Pittodrie Stadium; Attendance: 15,567; Referee: Steven McLean |

| 21 December 2022 | Celtic | 2–1 | Livingston | Glasgow |
| 19:45 GMT | Obileye 23' (o.g.); Furuhashi 45' | BBC Sport; Celtic Report | Devlin 45+2' | Stadium: Celtic Park; Attendance: 58,499; Referee: Euan Anderson |

| 24 December 2022 | Celtic | 4–1 | St Johnstone | Glasgow |
| 12:30 GMT | Hatate 14', 52'; Furuhashi 18', 40' | BBC Sport; Celtic Report | Wright 67' | Stadium: Celtic Park; Attendance: 58,635; Referee: Kevin Clancy |

| 28 December 2022 | Hibernian | 0–4 | Celtic | Edinburgh |
| 20:00 GMT | | BBC Sport; Celtic Report | Mooy 28', 58' (pen.); Maeda 36'; Furuhashi 64' | Stadium: Easter Road; Attendance: 19,730; Referee: Alan Muir |

| 2 January 2023 | Rangers | 2–2 | Celtic | Glasgow |
| 12:30 GMT | Kent 47'; Tavernier 53' (pen.) | BBC Sport; Celtic Report | Maeda 5'; Furuhashi 88' | Stadium: Ibrox Stadium; Attendance: 50,066; Referee: John Beaton |

| 7 January 2023 | Celtic | 2–0 | Kilmarnock | Glasgow |
| 15:00 GMT | Jota 45'; Taylor 51' (o.g.) | BBC Sport; Celtic Report | | Stadium: Celtic Park; Attendance: 58,612; Referee: Nick Walsh |

| 18 January 2023 | Celtic | 4–0 | St Mirren | Glasgow |
| 19:45 GMT | Abada 15'; Furuhashi 35', 53'; Turnbull 86' | BBC Sport; Celtic Report | | Stadium: Celtic Park; Attendance: 58,493; Referee: Steven McLean |

| 29 January 2023 | Dundee United | 0–2 | Celtic | Dundee |
| 16:00 GMT | | BBC Sport; Celtic Report | Jota 51'; Mooy 56' (pen.) | Stadium: Tannadice Park; Attendance: 12,448; Referee: Don Robertson |

| 1 February 2023 | Celtic | 3–0 | Livingston | Glasgow |
| 19:45 GMT | Taylor 29'; Maeda 33'; Furuhashi 45+2' | BBC Sport; Celtic Report | | Stadium: Celtic Park; Attendance: 58,295; Referee: Nick Walsh |

| 5 February 2023 | St Johnstone | 1–4 | Celtic | Perth |
| 12:00 GMT | Wright 25' | BBC Sport; Celtic Report | Considine 13' (o.g.); Furuhashi 22'; Mooy 38'; Turnbull 90+3' | Stadium: McDiarmid Park; Attendance: 7,758; Referee: David Dickinson |

| 18 February 2023 | Celtic | 4–0 | Aberdeen | Glasgow |
| 15:00 GMT | McGregor 2'; Hatate 13', 76'; Abada 89' | BBC Sport; Celtic Report | | Stadium: Celtic Park; Attendance: 59,090; Referee: Willie Collum |

| 5 March 2023 | St Mirren | 1–5 | Celtic | Paisley |
| 12:00 GMT | O'Hara 6' (pen.) | BBC Sport; Celtic Report | Jota 56'; Johnston 61'; Abada 70'; O'Riley 72'; Oh 81' (pen.) | Stadium: St Mirren Park; Attendance: 6,939; Referee: David Dickinson |

| 8 March 2023 | Celtic | 3–1 | Heart of Midlothian | Glasgow |
| 19:45 GMT | Maeda 25'; Furuhashi 60'; Hakšabanović 84' | BBC Sport; Celtic Report | Ginnelly 6' | Stadium: Celtic Park; Attendance: 58,951; Referee: Alan Muir |

| 18 March 2023 | Celtic | 3–1 | Hibernian | Glasgow |
| 15:00 GMT | Jota 52' (pen.); Oh 81'; Hakšabanović 90+5' | BBC Sport; Celtic Report | Campbell 39' (pen.) | Stadium: Celtic Park; Attendance: 59,156; Referee: Steven McLean |

| 2 April 2023 | Ross County | 0–2 | Celtic | Dingwall |
| 12:00 BST | | BBC Sport; Celtic Report | Jota 45+5' (pen.); Bernabei 90+5' | Stadium: Victoria Park; Attendance: 6,690; Referee: Willie Collum |

| 8 April 2023 | Celtic | 3–2 | Rangers | Glasgow |
| 12:30 BST | Furuhashi 26', 62'; Jota 73' | BBC Sport; Celtic Report | Tavernier 45', 78' | Stadium: Celtic Park; Attendance: 59,621; Referee: Kevin Clancy |

| 16 April 2023 | Kilmarnock | 1–4 | Celtic | Kilmarnock |
| 12:00 BST | Donnelly 45' | BBC Sport; Celtic Report | Furuhashi 7'; Maeda 12'; O'Riley 18', 27' | Stadium: Rugby Park; Attendance: 8,201; Referee: David Dickinson |

| 22 April 2023 | Celtic | 1–1 | Motherwell | Glasgow |
| 15:00 BST | McGregor 24' | BBC Sport; Celtic Report | van Veen 55' | Stadium: Celtic Park; Attendance: 58,786; Referee: John Beaton |

| 7 May 2023 | Heart of Midlothian | 0–2 | Celtic | Edinburgh |
| 14:15 BST | | BBC Sport; Celtic Report | Furuhashi 67'; Oh 80' | Stadium: Tynecastle Park; Attendance: 18,143; Referee: Nick Walsh |

| 13 May 2023 | Rangers | 3–0 | Celtic | Glasgow |
| 12:30 BST | Cantwell 5'; Souttar 34'; Sakala 70' | BBC Sport; Celtic Report | | Stadium: Ibrox Stadium; Attendance: 50,104; Referee: Steven McLean |

| 20 May 2023 | Celtic | 2–2 | St Mirren | Glasgow |
| 15:00 BST | Furuhashi 14'; McGregor 81' | BBC Sport; Celtic Report | Main 4', 39' | Stadium: Celtic Park; Attendance: 58,742; Referee: David Munro |

| 24 May 2023 | Hibernian | 4–2 | Celtic | Edinburgh |
| 19:45 BST | Youan 52', 80'; Nisbet 75' (pen.); Bernabei 86' (o.g.) | BBC Sport; Celtic Report | Hatate 41' (pen.); Oh 58' | Stadium: Easter Road; Attendance: 18,171; Referee: Kevin Clancy |

| 27 May 2023 | Celtic | 5–0 | Aberdeen | Glasgow |
| 12:30 BST | Furuhashi 27', 32'; Starfelt 78'; Oh 82', 90' | BBC Sport; Celtic Report | | Stadium: Celtic Park; Attendance: 59,146; Referee: Alan Muir |

== Scottish Cup ==
On 28 November, Celtic were drawn to face Greenock Morton at Celtic Park in the fourth round of the 2022–23 Scottish Cup. On 22 January 2023, Celtic were drawn to face St Mirren at Celtic Park in the fifth round. On 13 February, Celtic were drawn to face Heart of Midlothian at Tynecastle Park in the quarter-finals. On 13 March, Celtic were drawn to face Rangers in the semi-finals. Celtic faced Inverness Caledonian Thistle in the final on 3 June.

| 21 January 2023 Fourth round | Celtic | 5–0 | Greenock Morton | Glasgow |
| 12:15 GMT | Mooy 18' (pen.), 84'; Furuhashi 21', 45+1'; Turnbull 42' | BBC Sport; Celtic Report | | Stadium: Celtic Park; Attendance: 40,011; Referee: Kevin Clancy |

| 11 February 2023 Fifth round | Celtic | 5–1 | St Mirren | Glasgow |
| 17:30 GMT | Maeda 16'; Hatate 76' (pen.), 90+5'; Oh 80'; O'Riley 90' | BBC Sport; Celtic Report | O'Hara 87' (pen.) | Stadium: Celtic Park; Attendance: 37,728; Referee: Steven McLean |

| 11 March 2023 Quarter-finals | Heart of Midlothian | 0–3 | Celtic | Edinburgh |
| 12:15 GMT | | BBC Sport; Celtic Report | Mooy 2'; Furuhashi 45'; Carter-Vickers 80' | Stadium: Tynecastle Park; Attendance: 16,287; Referee: Kevin Clancy |

| 30 April 2023 Semi-finals | Rangers | 0–1 | Celtic | Glasgow |
| 13:30 BST | | BBC Sport; Celtic Report | Jota 42' | Stadium: Hampden Park; Attendance: 49,839; Referee: Don Robertson |

| 3 June 2023 Final | Celtic | 3–1 | Inverness Caledonian Thistle | Glasgow |
| 17:30 BST | Furuhashi 38'; Abada 65'; Jota 90+1' | BBC Sport; Celtic Report | MacKay 84' | Stadium: Hampden Park; Attendance: 47,247; Referee: John Beaton |

== Scottish League Cup ==
On 24 July, Celtic were drawn to face Ross County in the second round of the 2022–23 Scottish League Cup. On 31 August, Celtic were drawn to face Motherwell in the quarter-finals. On 19 October, Celtic were drawn to face Kilmarnock in the semi-finals. On 15 January, it was determined that Celtic would face Rangers in the final.

| 31 August 2022 Second round | Ross County | 1–4 | Celtic | Dingwall |
| 19:45 BST | Iacovitti 68' | BBC Sport; Celtic Report | McGregor 21'; Giakoumakis 25'; Maeda 73'; Forrest 90' | Stadium: Victoria Park; Attendance: 4,801; Referee: Willie Collum |

| 19 October 2022 Quarter-finals | Motherwell | 0–4 | Celtic | Motherwell |
| 18:15 BST | | BBC Sport; Celtic Report | Abada 44', 56'; Hatate 60'; Furuhashi 76' | Stadium: Fir Park; Attendance: 8,370; Referee: Don Robertson |

| 14 January 2023 Semi-finals | Celtic | 2–0 | Kilmarnock | Glasgow |
| 17:30 GMT | Maeda 18'; Giakoumakis 90+5' | BBC Sport; Celtic Report | | Stadium: Hampden Park; Attendance: 45,787; Referee: Willie Collum |

| 26 February 2023 Final | Rangers | 1–2 | Celtic | Glasgow |
| 15:00 GMT | Morelos 64' | BBC Sport; Celtic Report | Furuhashi 44', 56' | Stadium: Hampden Park; Attendance: 49,529; Referee: Nick Walsh |

== UEFA Champions League ==
=== Group stage ===
Celtic entered the 2022–23 UEFA Champions League at the group stage for the first time since the 2008–09 season. On 25 August, the draw for the group stage was made. Celtic were drawn in Group F along with Real Madrid, RB Leipzig and Shakhtar Donetsk.

| Pos | Team | Pld | W | D | L | GF | GA | GD | Pts | Qualification | RMA | RBL | SHK | CEL |
|---|---|---|---|---|---|---|---|---|---|---|---|---|---|---|
| 1 | (Spain) Real Madrid | 6 | 4 | 1 | 1 | 15 | 6 | +9 | 13 | Advance to knockout phase | — | 2–0 | 2–1 | 5–1 |
| 2 | (Germany) RB Leipzig | 6 | 4 | 0 | 2 | 13 | 9 | +4 | 12 | Advance to knockout phase | 3–2 | — | 1–4 | 3–1 |
| 3 | (Ukraine) Shakhtar Donetsk | 6 | 1 | 3 | 2 | 8 | 10 | −2 | 6 | Transfer to Europa League | 1–1 | 0–4 | — | 1–1 |
| 4 | (Scotland) Celtic | 6 | 0 | 2 | 4 | 4 | 15 | −11 | 2 | | 0–3 | 0–2 | 1–1 | — |

Source: UEFA
Rules for classification: Group stage tiebreakers

==== Matches ====
| 6 September 2022 Matchday 1 | Celtic (Scotland) | 0–3 | (Spain) Real Madrid | Glasgow |
| 20:00 BST | | Report | Vinícius 56'; Modrić 60'; Hazard 77' | Stadium: Celtic Park; Attendance: 57,057; Referee: Sandro Schärer (Switzerland) |

| 14 September 2022 Matchday 2 | Shakhtar Donetsk (Ukraine) | 1–1 | (Scotland) Celtic | Warsaw, Poland |
| 17:45 BST | Mudryk 29' | Report | Bondarenko 10' (o.g.) | Stadium: Stadion Wojska Polskiego (Note: Due to the Russian invasion of Ukraine, Ukrainian teams are required to play their home matches at neutral venues until further notice. Therefore, Shakhtar Donetsk will play their home matches at Stadion Wojska Polskiego, Warsaw, Poland, instead of their regular stadium, Donbas Arena in Donetsk.); Attendance: 20,697; Referee: Glenn Nyberg (Sweden) |

| 5 October 2022 Matchday 3 | RB Leipzig (Germany) | 3–1 | (Scotland) Celtic | Leipzig, Germany |
| 17:45 BST | Nkunku 27'; Silva 64', 77' | Report | Jota 47' | Stadium: Red Bull Arena; Attendance: 45,228; Referee: Espen Eskås (Norway) |

| 11 October 2022 Matchday 4 | Celtic (Scotland) | 0–2 | (Germany) RB Leipzig | Glasgow |
| 20:00 BST | | Report | Werner 75'; Forsberg 84' | Stadium: Celtic Park; Attendance: 57,565; Referee: Halil Umut Meler (Turkey) |

| 25 October 2022 Matchday 5 | Celtic (Scotland) | 1–1 | (Ukraine) Shakhtar Donetsk | Glasgow |
| 20:00 BST | Giakoumakis 34' | Report | Mudryk 58' | Stadium: Celtic Park; Attendance: 57,478; Referee: Serdar Gözübüyük (Netherlands) |

| 2 November 2022 Matchday 6 | Real Madrid (Spain) | 5–1 | (Scotland) Celtic | Madrid, Spain |
| 17:45 GMT | Modrić 6' (pen.); Rodrygo 21' (pen.); Asensio 51'; Vinícius 61'; Valverde 71' | Report | Jota 84' | Stadium: Santiago Bernabéu; Attendance: 52,511; Referee: Stéphanie Frappart (France) |

== Statistics ==
=== Appearances and goals ===
| No. | Pos | Nat | Player | Total | | Premiership | | League Cup | | Scottish Cup | | Champions League | |
| No. | Pos | Nat | Player | Apps | Goals | Apps | Goals | Apps | Goals | Apps | Goals | Apps | Goals |
Goalkeepers
| 1 | GK | (England) ENG | Joe Hart | 50 | 0 | 37 | 0 | 2 | 0 | 5 | 0 | 6 | 0 |
| 29 | GK | (Scotland) SCO | Scott Bain | 1 | 0 | 1 | 0 | 0 | 0 | 0 | 0 | 0 | 0 |
| 31 | GK | (Switzerland) SUI | Benjamin Siegrist | 2 | 0 | 0 | 0 | 2 | 0 | 0 | 0 | 0 | 0 |
Defenders
| 2 | DF | (Canada) CAN | Alistair Johnston | 20 | 1 | 14 | 1 | 1 | 0 | 5 | 0 | 0 | 0 |
| 3 | DF | (Scotland) SCO | Greg Taylor | 43 | 3 | 31 | 3 | 2 | 0 | 4 | 0 | 6 | 0 |
| 4 | DF | (Sweden) SWE | Carl Starfelt | 37 | 3 | 28 | 3 | 3 | 0 | 5 | 0 | 1 | 0 |
| 18 | DF | (Japan) JPN | Yuki Kobayashi | 7 | 0 | 5 | 0 | 0 | 0 | 2 | 0 | 0 | 0 |
| 20 | DF | (United States) USA | Cameron Carter-Vickers | 39 | 1 | 29 | 0 | 3 | 0 | 3 | 1 | 4 | 0 |
| 25 | DF | (Argentina) ARG | Alexandro Bernabei | 19 | 1 | 15 | 1 | 2 | 0 | 1 | 0 | 1 | 0 |
| 50 | DF | (Republic of Ireland) IRL | Bosun Lawal | 1 | 0 | 0 | 0 | 0 | 0 | 1 | 0 | 0 | 0 |
| 56 | DF | (Scotland) SCO | Anthony Ralston | 18 | 0 | 16 | 0 | 1 | 0 | 1 | 0 | 0 | 0 |
| 57 | DF | (Scotland) SCO | Stephen Welsh | 6 | 1 | 4 | 1 | 1 | 0 | 0 | 0 | 1 | 0 |
Midfielders
| 13 | MF | (Australia) AUS | Aaron Mooy | 42 | 7 | 29 | 4 | 4 | 0 | 4 | 3 | 5 | 0 |
| 14 | MF | (Scotland) SCO | David Turnbull | 38 | 5 | 28 | 4 | 2 | 0 | 3 | 1 | 5 | 0 |
| 16 | MF | (Republic of Ireland) IRL | James McCarthy | 5 | 0 | 2 | 0 | 2 | 0 | 0 | 0 | 1 | 0 |
| 24 | MF | (Japan) JPN | Tomoki Iwata | 18 | 0 | 13 | 0 | 1 | 0 | 4 | 0 | 0 | 0 |
| 33 | MF | (Denmark) DEN | Matt O'Riley | 52 | 4 | 38 | 3 | 3 | 0 | 5 | 1 | 6 | 0 |
| 41 | MF | (Japan) JPN | Reo Hatate | 45 | 9 | 32 | 6 | 3 | 1 | 4 | 2 | 6 | 0 |
| 42 | MF | (Scotland) SCO | Callum McGregor (captain) | 42 | 5 | 31 | 4 | 3 | 1 | 5 | 0 | 3 | 0 |
| 49 | MF | (Scotland) SCO | James Forrest | 23 | 5 | 16 | 4 | 2 | 1 | 2 | 0 | 3 | 0 |
| 53 | MF | (Scotland) SCO | Ben Summers | 2 | 0 | 2 | 0 | 0 | 0 | 0 | 0 | 0 | 0 |
| 69 | MF | (Republic of Ireland) IRL | Rocco Vata | 4 | 0 | 4 | 0 | 0 | 0 | 0 | 0 | 0 | 0 |
Forwards
| 8 | FW | (Japan) JPN | Kyogo Furuhashi | 50 | 34 | 36 | 27 | 3 | 3 | 5 | 4 | 6 | 0 |
| 9 | FW | (Montenegro) MNE | Sead Hakšabanović | 40 | 5 | 26 | 5 | 3 | 0 | 5 | 0 | 6 | 0 |
| 11 | FW | (Israel) ISR | Liel Abada | 47 | 13 | 34 | 10 | 4 | 2 | 4 | 1 | 5 | 0 |
| 17 | FW | (Portugal) POR | Jota | 43 | 15 | 33 | 11 | 2 | 0 | 4 | 2 | 4 | 2 |
| 19 | FW | (South Korea) KOR | Oh Hyeon-gyu | 21 | 7 | 16 | 6 | 1 | 0 | 4 | 1 | 0 | 0 |
| 38 | FW | (Japan) JPN | Daizen Maeda | 49 | 11 | 35 | 8 | 4 | 2 | 4 | 1 | 6 | 0 |
Departures
| 6 | DF | (Germany) GER | Moritz Jenz | 19 | 2 | 11 | 2 | 2 | 0 | 0 | 0 | 6 | 0 |
| 7 | FW | (Greece) GRE | Giorgos Giakoumakis | 28 | 9 | 19 | 6 | 3 | 2 | 0 | 0 | 6 | 1 |
| 21 | MF | (Japan) JPN | Yosuke Ideguchi | 0 | 0 | 0 | 0 | 0 | 0 | 0 | 0 | 0 | 0 |
| 28 | MF | (Denmark) DEN | Oliver Abildgaard | 9 | 0 | 6 | 0 | 1 | 0 | 0 | 0 | 2 | 0 |
| 88 | DF | (Croatia) CRO | Josip Juranović | 18 | 1 | 10 | 1 | 2 | 0 | 0 | 0 | 6 | 0 |

Last updated: 3 June 2023
Source: Competitions

Notes

1. Player's loan ended during the season
2. Player loaned out during the season
3. Player's temporary contract ended during the season
4. Player left the club during the season

=== Goalscorers ===
| R | No. | Pos. | Nation | Name | Premiership | League Cup | Scottish Cup | Champions League | Total |
|---|---|---|---|---|---|---|---|---|---|
| 1 | 8 | FW | (Japan) | Kyogo Furuhashi | 27 | 3 | 4 | 0 | 34 |
| 2 | 17 | FW | (Portugal) | Jota | 11 | 0 | 2 | 2 | 15 |
| 3 | 11 | FW | (Israel) | Liel Abada | 10 | 2 | 1 | 0 | 13 |
| 4 | 38 | FW | (Japan) | Daizen Maeda | 8 | 2 | 1 | 0 | 11 |
| 5 | 7 | FW | (Greece) | Giorgos Giakoumakis | 6 | 2 | 0 | 1 | 9 |
| 5 | 41 | MF | (Japan) | Reo Hatate | 6 | 1 | 2 | 0 | 9 |
| 7 | 13 | MF | (Australia) | Aaron Mooy | 4 | 0 | 3 | 0 | 7 |
| 7 | 19 | FW | (South Korea) | Oh Hyeon-gyu | 6 | 0 | 1 | 0 | 7 |
| 9 | 9 | FW | (Montenegro) | Sead Hakšabanović | 5 | 0 | 0 | 0 | 5 |
| 9 | 14 | MF | (Scotland) | David Turnbull | 4 | 0 | 1 | 0 | 5 |
| 9 | 42 | MF | (Scotland) | Callum McGregor | 4 | 1 | 0 | 0 | 5 |
| 9 | 49 | MF | (Scotland) | James Forrest | 4 | 1 | 0 | 0 | 5 |
| 13 | 33 | MF | (Denmark) | Matt O'Riley | 3 | 0 | 1 | 0 | 4 |
| 14 | 3 | DF | (Scotland) | Greg Taylor | 3 | 0 | 0 | 0 | 3 |
| 14 | 4 | DF | (Sweden) | Carl Starfelt | 3 | 0 | 0 | 0 | 3 |
| 16 | 6 | DF | (Germany) | Moritz Jenz | 2 | 0 | 0 | 0 | 2 |
| 17 | 2 | DF | (Canada) | Alistair Johnston | 1 | 0 | 0 | 0 | 1 |
| 17 | 20 | DF | (United States) | Cameron Carter-Vickers | 0 | 0 | 1 | 0 | 1 |
| 17 | 25 | DF | (Argentina) | Alexandro Bernabei | 1 | 0 | 0 | 0 | 1 |
| 17 | 57 | DF | (Scotland) | Stephen Welsh | 1 | 0 | 0 | 0 | 1 |
| 17 | 88 | DF | (Croatia) | Josip Juranović | 1 | 0 | 0 | 0 | 1 |
| Own goals | | | | | 4 | 0 | 0 | 1 | 5 |
| Total | | | | | 114 | 12 | 17 | 4 | 147 |

Last updated: 3 June 2023

=== Disciplinary record ===
Includes all competitive matches. Players listed below made at least one appearance for Celtic first squad during the season.

| N | P | Nat. | Name | Premiership | | | League Cup | | | Scottish Cup | | | Champions League | | | Total | | | Notes |
| N | P | Nat. | Name | Yellow card | Second yellow card | Red card | Yellow card | Second yellow card | Red card | Yellow card | Second yellow card | Red card | Yellow card | Second yellow card | Red card | Yellow card | Second yellow card | Red card | Notes |
| 42 | MF | (Scotland) | Callum McGregor | 3 | | 1 | | | | 1 | | | | | | 4 | | 1 | |
| 14 | MF | (Scotland) | David Turnbull | 1 | | 1 | | | | | | | | | | 1 | | 1 | |
| 38 | FW | (Japan) | Daizen Maeda | 3 | 1 | | | | | 1 | | | 1 | | | 5 | 1 | | |
| 20 | DF | (United States) | Cameron Carter-Vickers | 5 | | | | | | 1 | | | | | | 6 | | | |
| 6 | DF | (Germany) | Moritz Jenz | 4 | | | | | | | | | 1 | | | 5 | | | |
| 33 | MF | (Denmark) | Matt O'Riley | 3 | | | | | | | | | 2 | | | 5 | | | |
| 3 | DF | (Scotland) | Greg Taylor | 3 | | | 1 | | | | | | | | | 4 | | | |
| 8 | FW | (Japan) | Kyogo Furuhashi | 3 | | | | | | | | | 1 | | | 4 | | | |
| 4 | DF | (Sweden) | Carl Starfelt | 3 | | | | | | | | | | | | 3 | | | |
| 7 | FW | (Greece) | Giorgos Giakoumakis | 2 | | | 1 | | | | | | | | | 3 | | | |
| 11 | FW | (Israel) | Liel Abada | 2 | | | 1 | | | | | | | | | 3 | | | |
| 19 | FW | (South Korea) | Oh Hyeon-gyu | 2 | | | 1 | | | | | | | | | 3 | | | |
| 2 | DF | (Canada) | Alistair Johnston | 1 | | | 1 | | | | | | | | | 2 | | | |
| 13 | MF | (Australia) | Aaron Mooy | 2 | | | | | | | | | | | | 2 | | | |
| 25 | DF | (Argentina) | Alexandro Bernabei | 2 | | | | | | | | | | | | 2 | | | |
| 56 | DF | (Scotland) | Anthony Ralston | 2 | | | | | | | | | | | | 2 | | | |
| 57 | DF | (Scotland) | Stephen Welsh | 2 | | | | | | | | | | | | 2 | | | |
| 9 | FW | (Montenegro) | Sead Hakšabanović | 1 | | | | | | | | | | | | 1 | | | |
| 17 | FW | (Portugal) | Jota | 1 | | | | | | | | | | | | 1 | | | |
| 41 | MF | (Japan) | Reo Hatate | | | | | | | | | | 1 | | | 1 | | | |
| 88 | DF | (Croatia) | Josip Juranović | | | | | | | | | | 1 | | | 1 | | | |

Last updated: 3 June 2023
Source: Competitive matches
Only competitive matches
(yellow card) = Number of bookings; (second yellow card) = Number of sending offs after a second yellow card; (red card) = Number of sending offs by a direct red card.

=== Hat-tricks ===
| Player | Against | Result | Date | Competition |
|---|---|---|---|---|
| (Japan) Kyogo Furuhashi | (Scotland) Dundee United | 9–0 (A) | 28 August 2022 | Premiership |
| (Israel) Liel Abada | (Scotland) Dundee United | 9–0 (A) | 28 August 2022 | Premiership |
| (Scotland) James Forrest | (Scotland) Hibernian | 6–1 (H) | 15 October 2022 | Premiership |

(H) – Home; (A) – Away; (N) – Neutral

=== Clean sheets ===
As of 3 June 2023.

| Rank | Name | Premiership | League Cup | Scottish Cup | Champions League | Total | Played Games |
|---|---|---|---|---|---|---|---|
| 1 | (England) Joe Hart | 16 | 1 | 3 | 0 | 20 | 50 |
| 2 | (Switzerland) Benjamin Siegrist | 0 | 1 | 0 | 0 | 1 | 2 |
| 3 | (Scotland) Scott Bain | 0 | 0 | 0 | 0 | 0 | 1 |
| Total | | 16 | 2 | 3 | 0 | 21 | 53 |

=== Attendances ===
As of match played 27 May 2023

| | Matches | Attendances | Average | High | Low |
|---|---|---|---|---|---|
| Premiership | 19 | 1,116,725 | 58,775 | 59,621 | 58,295 |
| League Cup | 0 | 0 | 0 | 0 | 0 |
| Scottish Cup | 2 | 77,739 | 38,869 | 40,011 | 37,728 |
| Champions League | 3 | 172,100 | 57,366 | 57,565 | 57,057 |
| Total | 24 | 1,366,564 | 56,940 | 59,621 | 37,728 |

== Team statistics ==
=== League table ===
| Pos | Team | Pld | W | D | L | GF | GA | GD | Pts | Qualification or relegation (Note: Teams play each other three times (33 matches), before the league is split into two groups (the top six and the bottom six).) |
|---|---|---|---|---|---|---|---|---|---|---|
| 1 | Celtic (C) | 38 | 32 | 3 | 3 | 114 | 34 | +80 | 99 | Qualification for the Champions League group stage |
| 2 | Rangers | 38 | 29 | 5 | 4 | 93 | 37 | +56 | 92 | Qualification for the Champions League third qualifying round |
| 3 | Aberdeen | 38 | 18 | 3 | 17 | 56 | 60 | −4 | 57 | Qualification for the Europa League play-off round |
| 4 | Heart of Midlothian | 38 | 15 | 9 | 14 | 63 | 57 | +6 | 54 | Qualification for the Europa Conference League third qualifying round |
| 5 | Hibernian | 38 | 15 | 7 | 16 | 57 | 59 | −2 | 52 | Qualification for the Europa Conference League second qualifying round |

Rules for classification: 1) Points; 2) Goal difference; 3) Goals scored; 4) Head-to-Head points; 5) Head-to-Head goal difference; 6) Play-off (only if deciding champion, UEFA competitions qualification, second stage group allocation or relegation).
(C) Champions

=== Competition overview ===
| Competition | First match | Last match | Starting round | Final position | Record | | | | | | | |
| Competition | First match | Last match | Starting round | Final position | Pld | W | D | L | GF | GA | GD | Win % |
|---|---|---|---|---|---|---|---|---|---|---|---|---|
| Premiership | 31 July 2022 | 27 May 2023 | Round 1 | Winners | 38 | 32 | 3 | 3 | 114 | 34 | +80 | 84.21 |
| League Cup | 31 August 2022 | 26 February 2023 | Second round | Winners | 4 | 4 | 0 | 0 | 12 | 2 | +10 | 100.00 |
| Scottish Cup | 21 January 2023 | 3 June 2023 | Fourth round | Winners | 5 | 5 | 0 | 0 | 17 | 2 | +15 | 100.00 |
| Champions League | 6 September 2022 | 2 November 2022 | Group stage | Group stage | 6 | 0 | 2 | 4 | 4 | 15 | −11 | 0.00 |
| Total | | | | | 53 | 41 | 5 | 7 | 147 | 53 | +94 | 77.36 |

Source: Competitions

== Club ==
=== Management ===
| Position | Staff |
|---|---|
| Manager | Ange Postecoglou |
| Assistant Manager | John Kennedy |
| First Team Coach | Harry Kewell |
| First Team Coach | Gavin Strachan |
| Goalkeeping Coach | Stevie Woods |

Last updated: 17 June 2022
Source: celticfc.com

=== Kit ===
Supplier: Adidas / Sponsors: Dafabet (front) and Magners (back)

The club is in the third year of a deal with Adidas – the club's official kit supplier.

| Home | Away | Third | Goalkeeper 1 | Goalkeeper 2 | Goalkeeper 3 |

- Home: The home kit features a subtle pattern within the club's traditional green and white hoops. White shorts and hooped socks complete the look.
- Away: The away kit features a black shirt with green and white pinstripes, and a shield-style club crest. The shirt is accompanied by black shorts and socks.
- Third: The third kit features a light grey shirt with bright yellow details, and sleeve cuffs showcasing the geometric outline of Celtic Park. The shirt is accompanied by black shorts and light grey socks.

== Transfers ==
=== In ===
| Pos | Player | From | Type | Window | Fee |
|---|---|---|---|---|---|
| FW | (Japan) Daizen Maeda | (Japan) Yokohama F. Marinos | Transfer | Summer | £1,600,000 |
| DF | (United States) Cameron Carter-Vickers | (England) Tottenham Hotspur | Transfer | Summer | £6,000,000 |
| GK | (Switzerland) Benjamin Siegrist | (Scotland) Dundee United | Transfer | Summer | Free |
| DF | (Argentina) Alexandro Bernabei | (Argentina) Lanús | Transfer | Summer | £3,750,000 |
| FW | (Portugal) Jota | (Portugal) Benfica | Transfer | Summer | £6,400,000 |
| DF | (Germany) Moritz Jenz | (France) Lorient | Loan | Summer | Loan |
| MF | (Australia) Aaron Mooy | (China) Shanghai Port | Transfer | Summer | Free |
| GK | (Northern Ireland) Josh Clarke | (Northern Ireland) Glenavon | Transfer | Summer | Free |
| FW | (Montenegro) Sead Hakšabanović | (Russia) Rubin Kazan | Transfer | Summer | £1,700,000 |
| MF | (Denmark) Oliver Abildgaard | (Russia) Rubin Kazan | Temporary | Summer | Free |
| DF | (Republic of Ireland) Justin Osagie | (England) West Ham United | Transfer | Summer | Free |
| DF | (Japan) Yuki Kobayashi | (Japan) Vissel Kobe | Transfer | Winter | Free |
| DF | (Canada) Alistair Johnston | (Canada) CF Montréal | Transfer | Winter | £3,000,000 |
| MF | (Japan) Tomoki Iwata | (Japan) Yokohama F. Marinos | Loan | Winter | Loan |
| FW | (South Korea) Oh Hyeon-gyu | (South Korea) Suwon Samsung Bluewings | Transfer | Winter | £2,500,000 |

Notes

1. Signed for Celtic B.
2. Using FIFA's special regulations related to the international response and other fallout from the Russian invasion of Ukraine, Abildgaard suspended his contract with Rubin Kazan for the 2022–23 season and signed a one-year contract with Celtic. This meant he remained a Rubin Kazan player, temporarily playing for Celtic.

=== Out ===
| Pos | Player | To | Type | Window | Fee |
|---|---|---|---|---|---|
| MF | (Scotland) Ewan Henderson | (Scotland) Hibernian | End of contract | Summer | Free |
| GK | (Greece) Vasilis Barkas | (Netherlands) Utrecht | Loan | Summer | Loan |
| MF | (Scotland) Kerr McInroy | (Scotland) Kilmarnock | End of contract | Summer | Free |
| MF | (Republic of Ireland) Luca Connell | (England) Barnsley | End of contract | Summer | Free |
| DF | (Republic of Ireland) Liam Scales | (Scotland) Aberdeen | Loan | Summer | Loan |
| DF | (Scotland) Adam Montgomery | (Scotland) St Johnstone | Loan | Summer | Loan |
| MF | (Israel) Nir Bitton | (Israel) Maccabi Tel Aviv | End of contract | Summer | Free |
| MF | (Republic of Ireland) Barry Coffey | (Republic of Ireland) Cork City | End of contract | Summer | Free |
| MF | (Scotland) Brody Paterson | (England) Hartlepool United | End of contract | Summer | Free |
| MF | (England) Karamoko Dembélé | (France) Brest | End of contract | Summer | Free |
| GK | (Scotland) Ross Doohan | (England) Tranmere Rovers | Transfer | Summer | Undisclosed |
| MF | (Ivory Coast) Ismaila Soro | (Portugal) Arouca | Loan | Summer | Loan |
| DF | (Belgium) Boli Bolingoli | (Belgium) Mechelen | Transfer | Summer | Undisclosed |
| MF | (Scotland) Frankie Deane | (England) Burnley | End of contract | Summer | Free |
| DF | (Netherlands) Osaze Urhoghide | (Belgium) Oostende | Loan | Summer | Loan |
| MF | (Northern Ireland) Ben Wylie | (Scotland) Airdrieonians | Loan | Summer | Loan |
| FW | (Republic of Ireland) Jonathan Afolabi | (Republic of Ireland) Bohemians | End of contract | Summer | Free |
| FW | (Republic of Ireland) Johnny Kenny | (Scotland) Queen's Park | Loan | Summer | Loan |
| DF | (France) Christopher Jullien | (France) Montpellier | Transfer | Summer | £850,000 |
| FW | (Scotland) Owen Moffat | (England) Blackpool | Transfer | Summer | Undisclosed |
| FW | (Switzerland) Albian Ajeti | (Austria) Sturm Graz | Loan | Summer | Loan |
| MF | (England) Liam Shaw | (England) Morecambe | Loan | Summer | Loan |
| MF | (Scotland) Mikey Johnston | (Portugal) Vitória de Guimarães | Loan | Summer | Loan |
| MF | (Australia) Tom Rogic | (England) West Bromwich Albion | End of contract | Summer | Free |
| GK | (Scotland) Ryan Mullen | (Scotland) Clyde | End of contract | Summer | Free |
| FW | (Republic of Ireland) Johnny Kenny | (Republic of Ireland) Shamrock Rovers | Loan | Winter | Loan |
| GK | (England) Tobi Oluwayemi | (Republic of Ireland) Cork City | Loan | Winter | Loan |
| MF | (Scotland) Scott Robertson | (England) Fleetwood Town | Transfer | Winter | Undisclosed |
| DF | (Croatia) Josip Juranović | (Germany) Union Berlin | Transfer | Winter | £7,500,000 |
| FW | (Scotland) Eseosa Sule | (England) West Bromwich Albion | Transfer | Winter | Undisclosed |
| MF | (Japan) Yosuke Ideguchi | (Japan) Avispa Fukuoka | Loan | Winter | Loan |
| FW | (Greece) Giorgos Giakoumakis | (United States) Atlanta United | Transfer | Winter | £4,300,000 |
| DF | (Scotland) Ewan Otoo | (Scotland) Dunfermline Athletic | Loan | Winter | Loan |

== See also ==
- List of Celtic F.C. seasons
