= 2023–24 Dunfermline Athletic F.C. season =

Dunfermline Athletic
2023–24 season
- Chairman: David Cook
- Manager: James McPake
- Stadium: East End Park; Dunfermline, Scotland (Capacity: 11,480)
- Scottish Championship: Sixth place
- Scottish Cup: Third round
- League Cup: Group stage
- Challenge Cup: Third round
- Top goalscorer: League: Chris Kane & Craig Wighton (5); All: Lewis McCann (7)
- Highest home attendance: 8,447, vs. Raith Rovers, Championship, 2 January 2024
- Lowest home attendance: 1,364, vs. Annan Athletic, League Cup, 18 July 2023
- Average home league attendance: 5,444
Home colours	Away colours
- All statistics correct as of 6 July 2023.

The 2023–24 season was Dunfermline Athletic's first season back in the Scottish Championship, following their promotion from Scottish League One.

== Squad list ==
As of match played 3 May 2024

No.	Name	Nationality	Position	Date of birth (age)	Signed from	Signed in	Signed until	Apps.	Goals
Goalkeepers
1	Deniz Mehmet	(Turkey)	GK	19 September 1992 (age 33)	Dundee United	2021	2026	85	0
20	Harrison Sharp	(Scotland)	GK	4 April 2001 (age 24)	Dundee	2023	2024	8	0
44	Max Little	(England)	GK	29 June 2002 (age 23)	Queen's Park Rangers	2022	2024	3	0
Defenders
2	Aaron Comrie	(Scotland)	DF	3 February 1997 (age 28)	St Johnstone	2019	2023	158	4
3	Josh Edwards	(Scotland)	DF	27 May 2000 (age 25)	Airdrieonians	2019	2023	167	10
4	Kyle Benedictus	(Scotland)	DF	7 December 1991 (age 34)	Raith Rovers	2022	2024	60	8
6	Ewan Otoo	(Scotland)	DF	30 August 2002 (age 23)	Celtic B	2023	2026	48	2
12	Rhys Breen	(Scotland)	DF	6 January 2000 (age 26)	Rangers	2021	2023	59	5
15	Sam Fisher	(Scotland)	DF	26 July 2001 (age 24)	Dundee	2022	2026	46	1
19	Miller Fenton	(Scotland)	DF	16 October 2003 (age 22)	Fife Elite Football Academy	2019	2024	6	0
27	Sam Young	(Scotland)	DF	16 January 2006 (age 20)	Fife Elite Football Academy	2021	2024	1	0
29	Liam Hoggan	(Scotland)	DF	18 September 2006 (age 19)	Fife Elite Football Academy	2021	2024	1	0
33	Xavier Benjamin	(England)	DF	11 January 2004 (age 22)	Cardiff City	2024	2024	4	1
36	Miles Welch-Hayes	(England)	DF	25 October 1996 (age 29)	Livingston	2024	2024	12	1
64	Malachi Fagan-Walcott	(England)	DF	11 March 2002 (age 23)	Cardiff City	2024	2024	16	3
Midfielders
5	Chris Hamilton	(Scotland)	MF	13 July 2001 (age 24)	Heart of Midlothian	2022	—	71	4
7	Kane Ritchie-Hosler	(England)	MF	13 September 2002 (age 23)	Rangers	2023	2026	37	5
8	Joe Chalmers	(Scotland)	MF	3 January 1994 (age 32)	Ayr United	2022	2023	94	0
10	Matty Todd	(Scotland)	MF	14 June 2001 (age 24)	Fife Elite Football Academy	2018	2024	98	18
16	Ben Summers	(Scotland)	MF	16 June 2004 (age 21)	Celtic	2023	2024	19	1
18	Paul Allan	(Scotland)	MF	7 February 2000 (age 25)	Fife Elite Football Academy	2017	2024	62	2
24	Jake Rennie	(Scotland)	MF	17 January 2005 (age 21)	Fife Elite Football Academy	2021	2024	1	0
25	Michael Beagley	(Scotland)	MF	2 February 2005 (age 20)	Fife Elite Football Academy	2021	2024	1	0
28	Andrew Tod	(Scotland)	MF	26 February 2006 (age 19)	Fife Elite Football Academy	2021	2024	14	0
30	Ewan McLeod	(Scotland)	MF	18 January 2006 (age 20)	Fife Elite Football Academy	2023	2024	1	0
Forwards
9	Craig Wighton	(Scotland)	FW	27 July 1997 (age 28)	Heart of Midlothian	2021	2023	94	33
11	Lewis McCann	(Northern Ireland)	FW	7 June 2001 (age 24)	Fife Elite Football Academy	2018	2024	125	22
14	Alex Jakubiak	(Scotland)	FW	27 August 1996 (age 29)	Dundee	2023	2024	27	2
17	Owen Moffat	(Scotland)	FW	6 January 2002 (age 24)	Blackpool	2023	2024	29	3
20	Chris Kane	(Scotland)	FW	5 September 1994 (age 31)	St Johnstone	2024	2024	10	5
23	Michael O'Halloran	(Scotland)	FW	6 January 1991 (age 35)	St Johnstone	2023	2025	27	1
26	Taylor Sutherland	(Scotland)	FW	12 December 2005 (age 20)	Fife Elite Football Academy	2022	2024	12	2
31	Jake Sutherland	(Scotland)	FW	6 November 2006 (age 19)	Fife Elite Football Academy	2023	2024	1	0
38	Brad Holmes	(England)	FW	16 December 2002 (age 23)	Blackpool	2024	2024	13	0

== Results & fixtures ==
Win Draw Loss Postponed

=== Pre-season ===
23 June 2023 Friendly	Dunfermline Athletic	0 – 3	(Germany) FC St. Pauli	Dunfermline, Scotland
19:00		Report	Eggestein 10'; Wahl 49'; Otto 77'	Stadium: East End Park; Attendance: 7,255; Referee: Scott Lambie

28 June 2023 Friendly	Cove Rangers	1 – 1	Dunfermline Athletic	Aberdeen, Scotland
19:30	Trialist 26'	report	Trialist 81'	Stadium: Balmoral Stadium; Attendance: 1,234

4 July 2023 Friendly	Dunfermline Athletic	1 – 1	St Johnstone	Dunfermline, Scotland
19:45	Wighton 13'	Report	Carey 26'	Stadium: East End Park; Attendance: 1,617; Referee: Kevin Clancy

9 July 2023 Friendly	Dunfermline Athletic	1 – 1	Heart of Midlothian	Dunfermline, Scotland
15:00	Haring 86 o.g.'	Report	Rathie 85'	Stadium: East End Park; Attendance: 4,883; Referee: Graham Grainger

11 July 2023 Friendly	Alloa Athletic	0 – 1	Dunfermline Athletic	Alloa, Scotland
19:45		Report	Hamilton 9'	Stadium: Recreation Park; Referee: Calum Scott

=== Scottish Championship ===
5 August 2023 1	Dunfermline Athletic	2 – 1	Airdrieonians	Dunfermline, Scotland
15:00	Otoo 30'; Allan 65'; Breen (red card) 77'	Report	Watson 22'	Stadium: East End Park; Attendance: 4,977; Referee: Grant Irvine

12 August 2023 2	Dundee United	1 – 1	Dunfermline Athletic	Dundee, Scotland
15:00	Cudjoe 90+5'	Report	Wighton 61'	Stadium: Tannadice Park; Attendance: 8,892; Referee: Euan Anderson

26 August 2023 3	Dunfermline Athletic	0 – 1	Raith Rovers	Dunfermline, Scotland
15:00		Report	Stanton 36'	Stadium: East End Park; Attendance: 7,583; Referee: Steven McLean

2 September 2023 4	Inverness CT	1 – 1	Dunfermline Athletic	Inverness, Scotland
15:00	Shaw 12'	Report	Hamilton 80'	Stadium: Caledonian Stadium; Attendance: 2,388; Referee: Matthew MacDermid

16 September 2023 5	Queen's Park	0 – 2	Dunfermline Athletic	Glasgow, Scotland
15:00		Report	McCann 51', 67'	Stadium: Hampden Park; Attendance: 1,968; Referee: Scott Lambie

23 September 2023 6	Dunfermline Athletic	3 – 1	Greenock Morton	Dunfermline, Scotland
15:00	Wighton 8'; McCann 27'; O'Halloran 89'	Report	Crawford 82'	Stadium: East End Park; Attendance: 5,344; Referee: Grant Irvine

30 September 2023 7	Partick Thistle	3 – 0	Dunfermline Athletic	Glasgow, Scotland
15:00	Robinson 21'; Graham 49'; McInroy 60'	Report		Stadium: Firhill Stadium; Attendance: 3,703; Referee: Colin Steven

21 October 2023 9	Dunfermline Athletic	0 – 1	Ayr United	Dunfermline, Scotland
15:00		Report	Chalmers 10'	Stadium: East End Park; Attendance: 5,073; Referee: David Munro

28 October 2023 10	Raith Rovers	1 – 0	Dunfermline Athletic	Kirkcaldy, Scotland
15:00	Stanton 90+3'	Report		Stadium: Stark's Park; Attendance: 5,925; Referee: Iain Snedden

3 November 2023 11	Greenock Morton	1 – 2	Dunfermline Athletic	Greenock, Scotland
19:45	Boyd 78 pen.'	Report	Moffat 1', 7'	Stadium: Cappielow; Attendance: 1,614; Referee: Graham Grainger

10 November 2023 12	Dunfermline Athletic	1 – 2	Dundee United	Dunfermline, Scotland
15:00	Moffat 53'	Report	Fotheringham 37'; Mochrie 85'	Stadium: East End Park; Attendance: 7,237; Referee: Chris Graham

18 November 2023 13	Dunfermline Athletic	1 – 1	Inverness CT	Dunfermline, Scotland
15:00	McCann 87'	Report	Devine 43'	Stadium: East End Park; Attendance: 5,034; Referee: Euan Anderson

28 November 2023 8	Dunfermline Athletic	3 – 0	Arbroath	Dunfermline, Scotland
19:45	Edwards 48'; Wighton 73', 90'	Report		Stadium: East End Park; Attendance: 3,226; Referee: Ross Hardie
Note: Fixture postponed due to a waterlogged pitch.

9 December 2023 15	Airdrieonians	1 – 2	Dunfermline Athletic	Airdrie, Scotland
19:45	Gallagher 90+2 pen.'	Report	Edwards 37'; Todd 69'	Stadium: Excelsior Stadium; Attendance: 1,650; Referee: Don Robertson

16 December 2023 16	Dunfermline Athletic	1 – 2	Partick Thistle	Dunfermline, Scotland
15:00	Todd 82'	Report	Milne 12'; Graham 45'	Stadium: East End Park; Attendance: 4,777; Referee: Chris Graham

23 December 2023 17	Arbroath	1 – 1	Dunfermline Athletic	Arbroath, Scotland
15:00	Bird 45+3' (red card) 74'	Report	Wighton 90+1'	Stadium: Gayfield Park; Attendance: 1,910; Referee: Lloyd Wilson

30 December 2023 18	Ayr United	2 – 2	Dunfermline Athletic	Ayr, Scotland
15:00	McGeady 41'; Stanger 63'	Report	Jakubiak 3', 9'	Stadium: Somerset Park; Attendance: 2,022; Referee: Ross Hardie

2 January 2024 19	Dunfermline Athletic	1 – 2	Raith Rovers	Dunfermline, Scotland
15:00	Summers 38'	Report	O'Reilly 11', 51'	Stadium: East End Park; Attendance: 8,447; Referee: Graham Grainger

5 January 2024 20	Queen's Park	2 – 1	Dunfermline Athletic	Glasgow, Scotland
19:45	Paton 55'; Thomas 79'	Report	Summers 85'	Stadium: Hampden Park; Attendance: 1,354; Referee: William Collum

27 January 2024 22	Dundee United	0 – 0	Dunfermline Athletic	Dundee, Scotland
15:00		Report		Stadium: Tannadice Park; Attendance: 8,260; Referee: Graham Grainger

3 February 2024 23	Dunfermline Athletic	0 – 5	Greenock Morton	Dunfermline, Scotland
15:00		Report	O'Connor 10', 51'; Baird 34', 57'; Garrity 75'	Stadium: East End Park; Attendance: 4,701; Referee: Kevin Clancy

10 February 2024 14	Dunfermline Athletic	0 – 3	Queen's Park	Dunfermline, Scotland
15:00		Report	Turner 66'; Thomas 75'; Carse 90+4'	Stadium: East End Park; Attendance: 4,433; Referee: Iain Snedden
Note: Match postponed due to a frozen pitch.

17 February 2024 24	Dunfermline Athletic	1 – 1	Arbroath	Dunfermline, Scotland
15:00	Fagan-Walcott 18'	Report	O'Brien 52'	Stadium: East End Park; Attendance: 4,743; Referee: Craig Napier

23 February 2024 25	Partick Thistle	1 – 3	Dunfermline Athletic	Glasgow, Scotland
19:45	Graham 30'	Report	Fagan-Walcott 37'; Todd 55'; Benjamin 65'	Stadium: Firhill Stadium; Attendance: 3,350; Referee: David Munro

27 February 2024 26	Inverness CT	0 – 0	Dunfermline Athletic	Inverness, Scotland
19:45		Report		Stadium: Caledonian Stadium; Attendance: 1,958; Referee: Gavin Duncan

2 March 2024 27	Dunfermline Athletic	2 – 0	Ayr United	Dunfermline, Scotland
15:00	Hamilton 42'; Kane 45+1'	Report		Stadium: East End Park; Attendance: 5,050; Referee: Peter Stuart

5 March 2024 21	Dunfermline Athletic	0 – 2	Airdrieonians	Dunfermline, Scotland
15:00		Report	Todorov 16'; McGill 60'	Stadium: East End Park; Attendance: 4,988; Referee: Duncan Williams
Note: Match postponed due to a water logged pitch.

9 March 2024 28	Raith Rovers	2 – 0	Dunfermline Athletic	Kirkcaldy, Scotland
15:00	Stanton 38'; Easton 78'	Report		Stadium: Stark's Park; Attendance: 6,274; Referee: Craig Napier

15 March 2024 29	Dunfermline Athletic	3 – 1	Dundee United	Dunfermline, Scotland
19:45	Todd 10'; Ritchie-Hosler 37', 53'	Report	Benedictus 80 o.g.'	Stadium: East End Park; Attendance: 6,368; Referee: Colin Steven

23 March 2024 30	Greenock Morton	0 – 1	Dunfermline Athletic	Greenock, Scotland
15:00		Report	Welch-Hayes 55'	Stadium: Cappielow; Attendance: 2,105; Referee: Steven McLean

30 March 2024 31	Arbroath	2 – 3	Dunfermline Athletic	Arbroath, Scotland
15:00	Stewart 54', 64'	Report	Otoo 24'; Allan 32'; Kane 45'	Stadium: Gayfield Park; Referee: Craig Napier

6 April 2024 32	Dunfermline Athletic	1 – 1	Partick Thistle	Dunfermline, Scotland
19:45	Kane 79 pen.'	Report	Graham 24'	Stadium: East End Park; Attendance: 5,572; Referee: Calum Scott

13 April 2024 33	Airdrieonians	2 – 1	Dunfermline Athletic	Airdrie, Scotland
15:00	McMaster 45'; Gallagher 63'	Report	Fagan-Walcott 60'	Stadium: Excelsior Stadium; Attendance: 2,393; Referee: Grant Irvine

20 April 2024 34	Dunfermline Athletic	0 – 0	Queen's Park	Dunfermline, Scotland
15:00		Report		Stadium: East End Park; Attendance: 5,123; Referee: Colin Steven

27 April 2024 35	Dunfermline Athletic	1 – 1	Inverness CT	Dunfermline, Scotland
15:00	Benedictus 41'	Report	Pepple 75'	Stadium: East End Park; Attendance: 5,317; Referee: Alan Muir

3 May 2024 36	Ayr United	3 – 3	Dunfermline Athletic	Ayr, Scotland
19:45	McKenzie 21'; McRoberts 68'; Dowds 73'	Report	Kane 35', 42'; Edwards 45'	Stadium: Somerset Park; Attendance: 2,748; Referee: William Collum

=== Scottish League Cup ===
==== Group stage ====
15 July 2023 1	Raith Rovers	1 – 1 (2 – 4 p)	Dunfermline Athletic	Kirkcaldy, Scotland
17:15	Easton 38'	Report	McCann 30'	Stadium: Stark's Park; Attendance: 4,022; Referee: Don Robertson

18 July 2023 2	Dunfermline Athletic	4 – 0	Annan Athletic	Dunfermline, Scotland
19:45	Fisher 17'; Douglas 23 o.g.' McCann 55', 59'	Report		Stadium: East End Park; Attendance: 1,364; Referee: Lloyd Wilson

22 July 2023 3	Dunfermline Athletic	0 – 2	Kilmarnock	Dunfermline, Scotland
15:00		Report	Murray 4'; Vassell 81'	Stadium: East End Park; Attendance: 2,784; Referee: Euan Anderson

25 July 2023 4	Albion Rovers	0 – 3	Dunfermline Athletic	Coatbridge, Scotland
19:45		Report	Edwards 23'; Wighton 80'; T. Sutherland 88'	Stadium: Cliftonhill; Attendance: 824; Referee: Gavin Duncan

=== Scottish Challenge Cup ===
9 September 2023 Third round	Dundee United	3 – 0	Dunfermline Athletic	Dundee, Scotland
15:00	Moult 18'; Comrie 34 o.g.' Glass 37'	Report		Stadium: Tannadice Park; Attendance: 2,408; Referee: Craig Napier

=== Scottish Cup ===
24 November 2023 Third round	Dunfermline Athletic	0 – 3	Raith Rovers	Dunfermline, Scotland
19:45		Report	Hamilton 15'; Stanton 65'; Vaughan 70'	Stadium: East End Park; Attendance: 5,243; Referee: William Collum

== Squad statistics ==
=== Appearances and goals ===
As of match played 3 May 2024

No.	Pos	Nat	Player	Total		Scottish Championship		League Cup		Scottish Challenge Cup		Scottish Cup	
No.	Pos	Nat	Player	Apps	Goals	Apps	Goals	Apps	Goals	Apps	Goals	Apps	Goals
1	GK	(Turkey) TUR	Deniz Mehmet	34	0	29	0	4	0	0	0	1	0
2	DF	(Scotland) SCO	Aaron Comrie	26	0	18+2	0	4	0	1	0	1	0
3	DF	(Scotland) SCO	Josh Edwards	42	4	36	3	4	1	0+1	0	1	0
4	DF	(Scotland) SCO	Kyle Benedictus	18	1	13+1	1	3+1	0	0	0	0	0
5	MF	(Scotland) SCO	Chris Hamilton	34	2	27+3	2	2	0	1	0	1	0
6	DF	(Scotland) SCO	Ewan Otoo	37	2	31	2	4	0	1	0	1	0
7	MF	(England) ENG	Kane Ritchie-Hosler	15	2	10+4	2	0	0	0	0	0+1	0
8	MF	(Scotland) SCO	Joe Chalmers	35	0	23+6	0	3+1	0	1	0	1	0
9	FW	(Scotland) SCO	Craig Wighton	25	6	13+7	5	4	1	0	0	0+1	0
10	MF	(Scotland) SCO	Matty Todd	21	4	16+2	4	2	0	0	0	0+1	0
11	FW	(Northern Ireland) NIR	Lewis McCann	37	7	24+7	4	4	3	0+1	0	1	0
12	DF	(Scotland) SCO	Rhys Breen	14	0	8+2	0	3+1	0	0	0	0	0
14	FW	(Scotland) SCO	Alex Jakubiak	28	2	14+13	2	0	0	0	0	1	0
15	DF	(Scotland) SCO	Sam Fisher	29	1	20+4	0	4	1	0	0	1	0
16	MF	(Scotland) SCO	Ben Summers	20	2	16+4	2	0	0	0	0	0	0
17	FW	(Scotland) SCO	Owen Moffat	30	3	11+17	3	0	0	1	0	1	0
18	MF	(Scotland) SCO	Paul Allan	33	2	18+9	2	1+3	0	1	0	1	0
19	DF	(Scotland) SCO	Miller Fenton	3	0	0+1	0	0+1	0	1	0	0	0
20	FW	(Scotland) SCO	Chris Kane	10	5	10	5	0	0	0	0	0	0
23	FW	(Scotland) SCO	Michael O'Halloran	29	1	18+9	1	0+1	0	1	0	0	0
24	MF	(Scotland) SCO	Jake Rennie	0	0	0	0	0	0	0	0	0	0
25	MF	(Scotland) SCO	Michael Beagley	0	0	0	0	0	0	0	0	0	0
26	FW	(Scotland) SCO	Taylor Sutherland	10	1	0+6	0	0+3	1	1	0	0	0
27	MF	(Scotland) SCO	Sam Young	0	0	0	0	0	0	0	0	0	0
28	MF	(Scotland) SCO	Andrew Tod	9	0	1+4	0	2+1	0	1	0	0	0
29	DF	(Scotland) SCO	Liam Hoggan	2	0	0+1	0	0+1	0	0	0	0	0
30	MF	(Scotland) SCO	Ewan McLeod	1	0	0	0	0	0	1	0	0	0
31	FW	(Scotland) SCO	Jake Sutherland	1	0	0+1	0	0	0	0	0	0	0
33	DF	(England) ENG	Xavier Benjamin	4	1	4	1	0	0	0	0	0	0
36	DF	(England) ENG	Miles Welch-Hayes	12	1	10+2	1	0	0	0	0	0	0
38	FW	(England) ENG	Brad Holmes	13	0	2+11	0	0	0	0	0	0	0
44	GK	(England) ENG	Max Little	2	0	0+1	0	0	0	1	0	0	0
64	DF	(England) ENG	Malachi Fagan-Walcott	15	3	15	3	0	0	0	0	0	0
Players who left during the season:
20	GK	(Scotland) SCO	Harrison Sharp	8	0	7+1	0	0	0	0	0	0	0

=== Goalscorers ===
As of match played 3 May 2024

Ranking	Position	Nation	Name	Total	Scottish Championship	Scottish League Cup	Scottish Challenge Cup	Scottish Cup
1	FW	(Northern Ireland)	Lewis McCann	7	4	3		
2	FW	(Scotland)	Craig Wighton	6	5	1		
3	FW	(Scotland)	Chris Kane	5	5			
4	DF	(Scotland)	Josh Edwards	4	3	1		
4	MF	(Scotland)	Matty Todd	4	4			
5	DF	(England)	Malachi Fagan-Walcott	3	3			
5	FW	(Scotland)	Owen Moffat	3	3			
6	MF	(Scotland)	Paul Allan	2	2			
6	MF	(Scotland)	Chris Hamilton	2	2			
6	FW	(Scotland)	Alex Jakubiak	2	2			
6	DF	(Scotland)	Ewan Otoo	2	2			
6	MF	(England)	Kane Ritchie-Hosler	2	2			
6	MF	(Scotland)	Ben Summers	2	2			
7	DF	(Scotland)	Kyle Benedictus	1	1			
7	DF	(England)	Xavier Benjamin	1	1			
7	DF	(Scotland)	Sam Fisher	1		1		
7	FW	(Scotland)	Michael O'Halloran	1	1			
7	FW	(Scotland)	Taylor Sutherland	1		1		
7	DF	(England)	Miles Welch-Hayes	1	1			
Total				50	43	7	0	0

=== Disciplinary record ===
As of match played 27 April 2024

Squad number	Position	Nation	Name	Total		Scottish Championship		Scottish League Cup		Scottish Challenge Cup		Scottish Cup	
Squad number	Position	Nation	Name	Booked	Sent off (straight red)	Booked	Sent off (straight red)	Booked	Sent off (straight red)	Booked	Sent off (straight red)	Booked	Sent off (straight red)
1	GK	(Turkey)	Deniz Mehmet	1		1							
2	DF	(Scotland)	Aaron Comrie	1		1							
3	DF	(Scotland)	Josh Edwards	3		3							
4	DF	(Scotland)	Kyle Benedictus	3		3							
5	MF	(Scotland)	Chris Hamilton	10		9		1					
6	DF	(Scotland)	Ewan Otoo	5		5						1	
7	MF	(England)	Kane Ritchie-Hosler	2		2		1					
8	MF	(Scotland)	Joe Chalmers	2		2							
9	FW	(Scotland)	Craig Wighton	1		1							
10	MF	(Scotland)	Matty Todd	1		1							
11	FW	(Northern Ireland)	Lewis McCann	4		3		1					
12	DF	(Scotland)	Rhys Breen	3	1	3	1						
14	FW	(Scotland)	Alex Jakubiak	1		1							
15	DF	(Scotland)	Sam Fisher	4		3		1					
16	MF	(Scotland)	Ben Summers	1		1							
17	FW	(Scotland)	Owen Moffat	1		1							
18	MF	(Scotland)	Paul Allan	2		2							
20	GK	(Scotland)	Harrison Sharp	1		1							
20	FW	(Scotland)	Chris Kane	2		2							
23	FW	(Scotland)	Michael O'Halloran	3		3							
28	MF	(Scotland)	Andrew Tod	2		2							
33	DF	(England)	Xavier Benjamin	2		2							
36	DF	(England)	Miles Welch-Hayes	2		2							
Total				58	1	53	1	3	0	0	0	1	0

== Club statistics ==
=== League table ===
Pos	Team	Pld	W	D	L	GF	GA	GD	Pts	Promotion, qualification or relegation
4	Airdrieonians	36	15	7	14	44	44	0	52	Qualification for the Premiership play-off quarter-final
5	Greenock Morton	36	12	9	15	43	46	−3	45	
6	Dunfermline Athletic	36	11	12	13	43	48	−5	45	
7	Ayr United	36	12	8	16	53	61	−8	44	
8	Queen's Park	36	11	10	15	50	56	−6	43	

Rules for classification: 1) Points; 2) Goal difference; 3) Goals scored; 4) Head-to-to head points; 5) Head-to-head goal difference; 6) Play-off (only for deciding promotion, play-off participation and relegation).

=== League cup table ===
Pos	Team	Pld	W	PW	PL	L	GF	GA	GD	Pts	Qualification	KIL	RAI	DNF	ALB	ANN
1	Kilmarnock	4	3	0	1	0	9	3	+6	10	Qualification for the second round	—	2–2p	—	—	3–0
2	Raith Rovers	4	2	1	1	0	8	5	+3	9	Qualification for the second round	—	—	1–1p	2–0	—
3	Dunfermline Athletic	4	2	1	0	1	8	3	+5	8		0–2	—	—	—	4–0
4	Albion Rovers	4	1	0	0	3	3	8	−5	3		1–2	—	0–3	—	—
5	Annan Athletic	4	0	0	0	4	3	12	−9	0		—	2–3	—	1–2	—

Rules for classification: 1) goal difference, 2) goals scored, 3) away goals scored, 4) matches won, 5) away matches won, 6) drawing of lots.

== Transfers ==
=== First team ===
==== Players in ====
Date	Position	No.	Nationality	Name	From	Fee	Ref.
24 May 2023	MF	7	(England)	Kane Ritchie-Hosler	Rangers	Undisclosed	
20 June 2023	DF	15	(Scotland)	Sam Fisher	Dundee	Compensation	
21 June 2023	DF	6	(Scotland)	Ewan Otoo	Celtic	Free	
9 July 2023	FW	23	(Scotland)	Michael O'Halloran	St Johnstone	Free	
8 September 2023	FW	14	(Scotland)	Alex Jakubiak	Dundee	Free	

==== Players out ====
Date	Position	No.	Nationality	Name	To	Fee	Ref.
7 May 2023	FW	7	(Scotland)	Kevin O'Hara	Hamilton Academical	Free	
7 May 2023	DF	6	(Scotland)	Kyle MacDonald	Hamilton Academical	Free	
7 May 2023	FW	10	(Bulgaria)	Nikolay Todorov	Airdrieonians	Free	

==== Loans in ====
Date	Position	No.	Nationality	Name	From	Duration	Ref.
3 August 2023	GK	20	(Scotland)	Harrison Sharp	Dundee	1 January 2024	
11 August 2023	MF	16	(Scotland)	Ben Summers	Celtic	31 May 2024	
1 September 2023	FW	17	(Scotland)	Owen Moffat	Blackpool	31 May 2024	
12 January 2024	DF	64	(England)	Malachi Fagan-Walcott	Cardiff City	31 May 2024	
30 January 2024	FW	38	(England)	Brad Holmes	Blackpool	31 May 2024	
1 February 2024	DF	33	(England)	Xavier Benjamin	Cardiff City	31 May 2024	
13 February 2024	FW	20	(Scotland)	Chris Kane	St Johnstone	31 May 2024	
22 February 2024	DF	36	(England)	Miles Welch-Hayes	Livingston	31 May 2024	

==== Loans out ====
Date	Position	No.	Nationality	Name	To	Duration	Ref.
15 July 2023	DF	27	(Scotland)	Sam Young	East Stirlingshire	15 January 2024	
29 September 2023	FW	26	(Scotland)	Taylor Sutherland	Bonnyrigg Rose	1 January 2024	
19 March 2024	DF	27	(Scotland)	Sam Young	Gala Fairydean Rovers	31 May 2024	
19 March 2024	MF	30	(Scotland)	Ewan McLeod	Crossgates Primrose	31 May 2024	
19 March 2024	FW	31	(Scotland)	Jake Sutherland	Crossgates Primrose	31 May 2024	
