= Kane Ritchie-Hosler =

English footballer (born 2002)

Personal information
- Full name: Kane Ritchie-Hosler
- Date of birth: 13 September 2002 (age 24)
- Place of birth: England
- Position: Winger

Team information
- Current team: Stenhousemuir (on loan from Dunfermline Athletic)

Youth career
- 2008–2018: Manchester City
- 2018–2021: Rangers

Senior career*
Years	Team	Apps	(Gls)
2021–2023	Rangers	0	(0)
2021	→ Clyde (loan)	5	(0)
2022–2023	→ Dunfermline Athletic (loan)	20	(2)
2023–	Dunfermline Athletic	55	(2)
2026–	→ Stenhousemuir (loan)	10	(1)
- * Club domestic league appearances and goals as of 4 May 2026

Kane Ritchie-Hosler (born 13 September 2002) is an English footballer who plays as a winger for Stenhousemuir.

== Club career ==
The English wide man started his career at Manchester City aged six. Ritchie-Hosler was at City for ten years from the age of six before moving to Rangers in 2018. His time there has included a loan spell at Clyde in 2021.

In September 2022 Ritchie-Hosler signed for Dunfermline Athletic on loan, making 23 appearances and scoring 3 goals. Kane signed permanently for the Pars at the end of the season, penning a 3-year deal.

Ritchie-Hosler's first season after signing for Dunfermline was injury laden with the winger requiring three surgeries for three different injuries within six months, limiting his appearances for the East End outfit.

In February 2026, Ritchie-Hosler joined Scottish League One club Stenhousemuir on loan for the remainder of the season.

== Career statistics ==
As of match played 26 January 2026

Appearances and goals by club, season and competition
Club	Season	League			Scottish Cup		League Cup		Other		Total	
Club	Season	Division	Apps	Goals	Apps	Goals	Apps	Goals	Apps	Goals	Apps	Goals
Rangers	2020–21	Scottish Premiership	0	0	0	0	0	0	0	0	0	0
Clyde (loan)	2020–21	Scottish League One	5	0	1	0	0	0	0	0	6	0
Clyde (loan)	Clyde Total		5	0	1	0	0	0	0	0	6	0
Dunfermline Athletic (loan)	2022–23	Scottish League One	20	2	2	1	0	0	0	0	22	3
Dunfermline Athletic	2023–24	Scottish Championship	14	2	1	0	0	0	0	0	15	2
Dunfermline Athletic	2024–25	Scottish Championship	26	0	3	0	4	1	4 (Note: Appearances in the Scottish Challenge Cup)	0	37	1
Dunfermline Athletic	2025–26	Scottish Championship	15	0	1	0	4	0	1	0	21	0
Dunfermline Athletic	Dunfermline Total		75	4	7	1	8	1	5	0	95	6
Career total			80	4	7	1	8	1	5	0	101	6
