= Harrison Sharp =

Scottish footballer

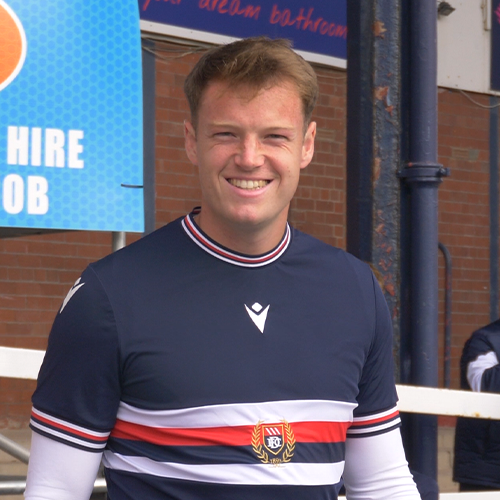
- Sharp during a Dundee warm-up in 2024

Personal information
- Date of birth: 4 April 2001 (age 25)
- Place of birth: Aberdeen, Scotland
- Position: Goalkeeper

Team information
- Current team: Dundee
- Number: 30

Youth career
- Aberdeen
- Dundee

Senior career*
Years	Team	Apps	(Gls)
2019–	Dundee	26	(0)
2020–2021	→ Edinburgh City (loan)	0	(0)
2023–2024	→ Dunfermline Athletic (loan)	8	(0)
2025	→ Montrose (loan)	2	(0)
2026	→ Montrose (loan)	17	(0)

International career^{‡}
2022	Scotland U21	0	(0)
- * Club domestic league appearances and goals as of 4 May 2026 ‡ National team caps and goals as of 23:58, 9 May 2026 (UTC)

Harrison Sharp (born 4 April 2001) is a Scottish professional footballer who plays as a goalkeeper for Scottish Premiership club Dundee.

== Club career ==
Sharp made his debut for Dundee coming off the bench in the Scottish Challenge Cup against Elgin City, after keeper Calum Ferrie was sent off during the game.

In October 2020, Sharp joined Edinburgh City on a season-long loan.

On 7 January 2021, Sharp signed a two-year extension with Dundee, keeping him at the club until 2023. In December 2021, he was listed as an outfield substitute for a Dundee game away to Aberdeen due to a combined injury and COVID-19 crisis within the squad, though spent the entire game on the bench. He made his first start for Dundee in a draw away to Motherwell. He made six further starts that season, including in a 3–1 victory at home to Hibernian.

Sharp began the 2022–23 season as first choice goalkeeper, starting all four Scottish League Cup group stage matches. He also started the season as Dundee's starting keeper, before being dropped to the bench in September. He won the Scottish Championship with Dundee at the end of the season.

On 2 June 2023, Dundee announced that Sharp had signed a new two-year contract, keeping him there until the summer of 2025. On 3 August, he joined Scottish Championship club Dunfermline Athletic on a loan until January 2024. He made his debut two days later in a league win over Airdrieonians. Sharp was recalled by Dundee on 18 January 2024. He came on as a substitute two days later to replace Adam Legzdins in the Scottish Cup game away to Kilmarnock. He made his first start of the season for Dundee the next week, and played well including saving a penalty in an away league victory over Livingston, which saw him named to the SPFL Team of the Week.

On 14 February 2025, Sharp again signed a new two-year deal with Dundee, running until the summer of 2027. On 23 October 2025, Sharp joined Scottish League One club Montrose on an emergency week-long loan following an injury to their first-choice keeper Cammy Gill. Sharp made his debut for the Gable Endies two days later in a home league defeat to Cove Rangers. On 5 January 2026, Sharp returned to Montrose on loan following another injury to Gill and remained their main keeper until the end of the season. After an injury finished Jon McCracken's season amid a minor goalkeeping crisis, Dundee received special dispensation from the SFA in May to call Sharp back from his loan after Montrose's season ended for the Dee's last 3 post-split fixtures.

== International career ==
Sharp was selected for the Scotland under-21 squad in May 2022.

== Career statistics ==
As of 25 April 2026

Appearances and goals by club, season and competition
Club	Season	League			Scottish Cup		League Cup		Other		Total	
Club	Season	Division	Apps	Goals	Apps	Goals	Apps	Goals	Apps	Goals	Apps	Goals
Dundee	2019–20	Scottish Championship	0	0	0	0	0	0	1 (Note: Appearance(s) in the Scottish Challenge Cup.)	0	1	0
Dundee	2020–21	Scottish Championship	0	0	0	0	0	0	0	0	0	0
Dundee	2021–22	Scottish Premiership	6	0	1	0	0	0	0	0	7	0
Dundee	2022–23	Scottish Championship	7	0	0	0	5	0	2	0	14	0
Dundee	2023–24	Scottish Premiership	1	0	1	0	0	0	0	0	2	0
Dundee	2024–25	Scottish Premiership	0	0	0	0	0	0	0	0	0	0
Dundee	2025–26	Scottish Premiership	0	0	0	0	0	0	0	0	0	0
Dundee	2026–27	Scottish Premiership	0	0	0	0	1	0	0	0	1	0
Dundee	Total		14	0	2	0	6	0	3	0	25	0
Dundee B	2023–24	—			—		—		1	0	1	0
Dundee B	2024–25	—			—		—		2	0	2	0
Dundee B	2025–26	—			—		—		3	0	3	0
Dundee B	Total		0	0	0	0	0	0	6	0	6	0
Edinburgh City (loan)	2020–21	Scottish League Two	0	0	0	0	0	0	0	0	0	0
Dunfermline Athletic (loan)	2023–24	Scottish Championship	8	0	0	0	—		0	0	8	0
Montrose (loan)	2025–26	Scottish League One	19	0	0	0	—		1	0	20	0
Career total			41	0	2	0	6	0	10	0	59	0

== Honours ==
Dundee

- Scottish Championship: 2022–23
