= Ewan Otoo =

Scottish footballer (born 2002)

Personal information
- Full name: Ewan Jude Otoo
- Date of birth: 30 August 2002 (age 24)
- Place of birth: Glasgow, Scotland
- Height: 1.82 m (6 ft 0 in)
- Positions: Left wing-back; left-back; centre-back

Team information
- Current team: Rotherham United
- Number: 3

Youth career
- Eastwood Boys Club
- 2010–2021: Celtic

Senior career*
Years	Team	Apps	(Gls)
2021–2023	Celtic	0	(0)
2021	→ Clyde (loan)	13	(0)
2022–2023	Celtic B	20	(1)
2023	→ Dunfermline Athletic (loan)	11	(0)
2023–2026	Dunfermline Athletic	77	(5)
2026–	Rotherham United	0	(0)

International career
2018	Scotland U17	2	(0)
- * Club domestic league appearances and goals as of 4 August 2026

Ewan Jude Otoo (born 30 August 2002) is a Scottish professional footballer who plays as a left wing-back or centre-back for EFL League Two club Rotherham United.

== Club career ==
Born in Glasgow, Otoo began his career with Eastwood Boys Club, before joining the academy of Celtic at the age of eight. He progressed through the academy, signing his first professional contract with the club in June 2019. The following month, he made his unofficial debut in a 1–0 friendly victory against Airdrieonians.

On 23 March 2021, Otoo joined Scottish League One club Clyde on loan. Shortly after his arrival, Clyde manager Danny Lennon praised Otoo's energy and attitude and described him as being ahead of his years in terms of maturity. He returned to Celtic following the conclusion of the season.

Otoo subsequently captained the club's B team in the Lowland League. His performances reportedly attracted interest from English clubs Aston Villa, Fulham and Burnley.

In February 2023, Otoo joined Scottish League One club Dunfermline Athletic on loan. He helped Dunfermline win the Scottish League One title and gain promotion to the Scottish Championship.

Otoo returned to Dunfermline on a permanent contract in June 2023. Following the move, he said Dunfermline was the best place for him to continue his development. He scored in his first competitive appearance following his permanent transfer, netting Dunfermline's equaliser in a 2–1 victory over Airdrieonians on 5 August 2023.

On 4 August 2026, Otoo signed for Rotherham United following a successful trial during the club's pre-season campaign. He agreed a two-year contract, with Rotherham holding an option to extend the agreement by a further year. The signing was announced as being subject to English Football League, Football Association and international clearance.

== International career ==
Otoo made two appearances for Scotland at under-17 level in 2018. He is also eligible to represent Ghana and expressed a desire to represent the country at senior international level in July 2019.

== Style of play ==
Otoo is a versatile player who can operate as a central defender, full-back or central midfielder. He has most regularly been deployed as a central defender or defensive midfielder and has cited Ghana international Thomas Partey as an influence on his playing style.

== Career statistics ==
As of matches played 8 August 2025

Appearances and goals by club, season and competition
Club	Season	League			Scottish Cup		League Cup		Other		Total	
Club	Season	Division	Apps	Goals	Apps	Goals	Apps	Goals	Apps	Goals	Apps	Goals
Celtic	2020–21	Scottish Premiership	0	0	0	0	0	0	0	0	0	0
Celtic	2021–22	Scottish Premiership	0	0	0	0	0	0	0	0	0	0
Celtic	2022–23	Scottish Premiership	0	0	0	0	0	0	0	0	0	0
Celtic	Total		0	0	0	0	0	0	0	0	0	0
Clyde (loan)	2020–21	Scottish League One	13	0	2	0	—		0	0	15	0
Celtic B	2022–23	Lowland League	20	1	—		—		3 (Note: Appearances in Scottish Challenge Cup)	0	23	1
Dunfermline Athletic (loan)	2022–23	Scottish League One	11	0	0	0	—		0	0	11	0
Dunfermline Athletic	2023–24	Scottish Championship	31	2	1	0	4	0	1	0	37	2
Dunfermline Athletic	2024–25	Scottish Championship	36	3	3	1	4	0	4	0	47	4
Dunfermline Athletic	2025–26	Scottish Championship	1	0	0	0	4	0	0	0	5	0
Dunfermline Athletic	Dunfermline Total		79	5	4	1	12	0	5	0	100	6
Career total			112	6	6	1	12	0	8	0	138	7

== Honours ==
Dunfermline Athletic

- Scottish League One: 2022–23
