= Chris Hamilton (footballer, born 2001) =

Scottish footballer

Personal information
- Date of birth: 13 July 2001 (age 25)
- Position: Defensive midfielder

Team information
- Current team: Ross County

Youth career
- Crossgates Primrose
- 2009–2018: Heart of Midlothian

Senior career*
Years	Team	Apps	(Gls)
2018–2022	Heart of Midlothian	1	(0)
2018–2019	→ Berwick Rangers (loan)	4	(0)
2019–2020	→ Cowdenbeath (loan)	20	(0)
2020	→ Dumbarton (loan)	7	(0)
2021	→ Stirling Albion (loan)	10	(1)
2021–2022	→ Arbroath (loan)	28	(0)
2022–2026	Dunfermline Athletic	118	(3)
2026–	Ross County	0	(0)

International career^{‡}
- Scotland U16
2016–2018	Scotland U17	10	(0)
2018	Scotland U18	2	(0)
2018–2020	Scotland U19	6	(0)
2018	Scotland U21	3	(0)
- * Club domestic league appearances and goals as of 26 June 2026 ‡ National team caps and goals as of 20:50, 20 February 2019 (UTC)

Chris Hamilton (born 13 July 2001) is a Scottish professional footballer who plays as a defensive midfielder for Scottish League One club Ross County. Hamilton started his career at Heart of Midlothian and had loan spells at Berwick Rangers, Cowdenbeath, Dumbarton, Stirling Albion and Arbroath before joining Dunfermline Athletic.

== Early life ==
Hamilton grew up as a Dunfermline Athletic fan.

== Club career ==
Hamilton moved from Crossgates Primrose to Heart of Midlothian at the age of 8.

He made his senior debut for Hearts on 13 May 2018, in a 1–0 league defeat away at Kilmarnock. He was one of four Hearts youth players to make their debuts in that match, alongside Cammy Logan, Leeroy Makovora and Connor Smith.

Hamilton joined Scottish League One side Dumbarton on loan in September 2020. Hamilton scored his first senior goal for the Sons on his full debut, in a 3–2 defeat to Clyde on 10 October 2020, a match in which he was also sent off. On 8 January 2021, Hamilton joined Scottish League Two side Stirling Albion on loan for the remainder of the 2020–21 season.

In July 2021 he was loaned to Scottish Championship club Arbroath.

In June 2022 Hamilton signed for his boyhood club Dunfermline Athletic on a long term deal. He was named vice captain as the season began and the team achieved an immediate return to the Championship, winning League One in April 2023. After a tough season in 2024–25, Hamilton signed a one year extension with the club until May 2026.

On 1 June 2026, following the expiry of his contract with Dunfermline, Hamilton signed for Scottish League One side Ross County.

== International career ==
Hamilton was captain of the Scotland under-16 Victory Shield squad. He has also represented Scotland at under-17, under-18, under-19 and under-21 youth levels.

Selected for the Scotland under-21 squad in the 2018 Toulon Tournament, the team lost to Turkey in a penalty-out and finished fourth.

== Career statistics ==
As of 8 May 2026

Appearances and goals by club, season and competition
Club	Season	League			Scottish Cup		League Cup		Other		Total	
Club	Season	Division	Apps	Goals	Apps	Goals	Apps	Goals	Apps	Goals	Apps	Goals
Heart of Midlothian	2017–18	Scottish Premiership	1	0	0	0	0	0	0	0	1	0
Heart of Midlothian U20/U21 (Note: Appearance in the Scottish Challenge Cup.)	2017–18		—						2	0	2	0
Heart of Midlothian U20/U21	2018–19		—						1	0	1	0
Heart of Midlothian U20/U21	2019–20		—						3	0	3	0
Heart of Midlothian U20/U21	Total		1	0	0	0	0	0	6	0	7	0
Berwick Rangers (Loan)	2018–19	Scottish League Two	4	0	2	0	0	0	0	0	6	0
Cowdenbeath (Loan)	2019–20	Scottish League Two	20	0	0	0	0	0	0	0	20	0
Dumbarton (Loan)	2020–21	Scottish League One	7	0	0	0	3	1	0	0	10	1
Stirling Albion (Loan)	2020–21	Scottish League Two	10	1	1	0	0	0	0	0	11	1
Arbroath (Loan)	2021–22	Scottish Championship	28	0	3	0	1	0	3	0	35	0
Dunfermline Athletic	2022–23	Scottish League One	31	1	3	0	5	1	2	0	41	2
Dunfermline Athletic	2023–24	Scottish Championship	32	2	1	0	2	0	1	0	36	2
Dunfermline Athletic	2024–25	Scottish Championship	32	0	3	1	4	0	4	0	43	1
Dunfermline Athletic	2025–26	Scottish Championship	23	0	4	0	3	0	2	0	32	0
Dunfermline Athletic	Total		118	3	11	1	14	1	9	0	152	5
Career total			190	4	17	1	17	2	18	0	241	7

== Honours ==
Dunfermline Athletic

- Scottish League One: 2022–23
