= Taylor Sutherland =

Scottish association football player

Personal information
- Date of birth: 12 December 2005 (age 20)
- Place of birth: Cowdenbeath, Scotland
- Height: 6 ft 1 in (1.85 m)
- Position: Forward

Team information
- Current team: Hamilton Academical
- Number: 9

Youth career
- 2015–2021: Fife Elite Football Academy
- 2021–2022: Dunfermline Athletic

Senior career*
Years	Team	Apps	(Gls)
2022–2026	Dunfermline Athletic	18	(0)
2023	→ Bonnyrigg Rose (loan)	10	(2)
2025–2026	→ Clyde (loan)	33	(4)
2026	Montrose	17	(8)
2026–	Hamilton Academical	2	(0)
- * Club domestic league appearances and goals as of 18 October 2026

Taylor Sutherland (born 12 December 2005) is a professional footballer who plays as forward for Scottish League One side Hamilton Academical.

== Career ==
Coming from Cowdenbeath, Sutherland started his football with Cowdenbeath and then the Fife Football Performance Academy. He was with Fife Elite from the age of ten and progressed through the age groups until joining Dunfermline Athletic in 2021. On 21 December 2022, just nine days after his seventeenth birthday, he signed his first full-time contract with Dunfermline. Sutherland made his first team debut when he started the Scottish Challenge Cup tie against Celtic B on 15 November 2022, scoring his first goal within the first three minutes of the match.

Sutherland joined League Two side Bonnyrigg Rose on a short-term loan on 29 September 2023. He made ten appearances and scored two goals for the side before returning to Dunfermline in January 2024.

On 13 March 2024, Sutherland signed a contract extension with Dunfermline, keeping him at the club for an additional two years. After appearing for the Pars in the League Cup group stage and the Challenge Cup, Sutherland's match time in the Championship was limited to 12 appearances off the bench. In January 2025 he joined Clyde on loan until the end of the season with the aim of starting games regularly.

On 20 January 2026, Sutherland signed a short-term six-month contract with Scottish League One club Montrose.

On 27 June 2026, Sutherland signed a two-year contract with Scottish League One side Hamilton Academical.

== Career statistics ==
As of match played 02 February 2025

Appearances and goals by club, season and competition
Club	Season	League			Scottish Cup		League Cup		Other		Total	
Club	Season	Division	Apps	Goals	Apps	Goals	Apps	Goals	Apps	Goals	Apps	Goals
Dunfermline Athletic	2022–23	Scottish League One	0	0	1	0	0	0	3 (Note: Appearance(s) in Scottish Challenge Cup)	1	4	1
Dunfermline Athletic	2023–24	Scottish Championship	6	0	0	0	3	1	1	0	10	1
Dunfermline Athletic	2024–25	Scottish Championship	12	0	1	0	4	2	2	0	19	2
Dunfermline Athletic	Dunfermline Total		18	0	2	0	7	3	6	1	33	4
Bonnyrigg Rose (loan)	2023–24	Scottish League Two	10	2	1	0	–		–		11	2
Clyde (loan)	2024–25	Scottish League Two	1	0	0	0	–		–		1	0
Career total			29	2	3	0	7	3	4	1	45	6
