= Andre Raymond =

Trinidadian footballer (born 2000)

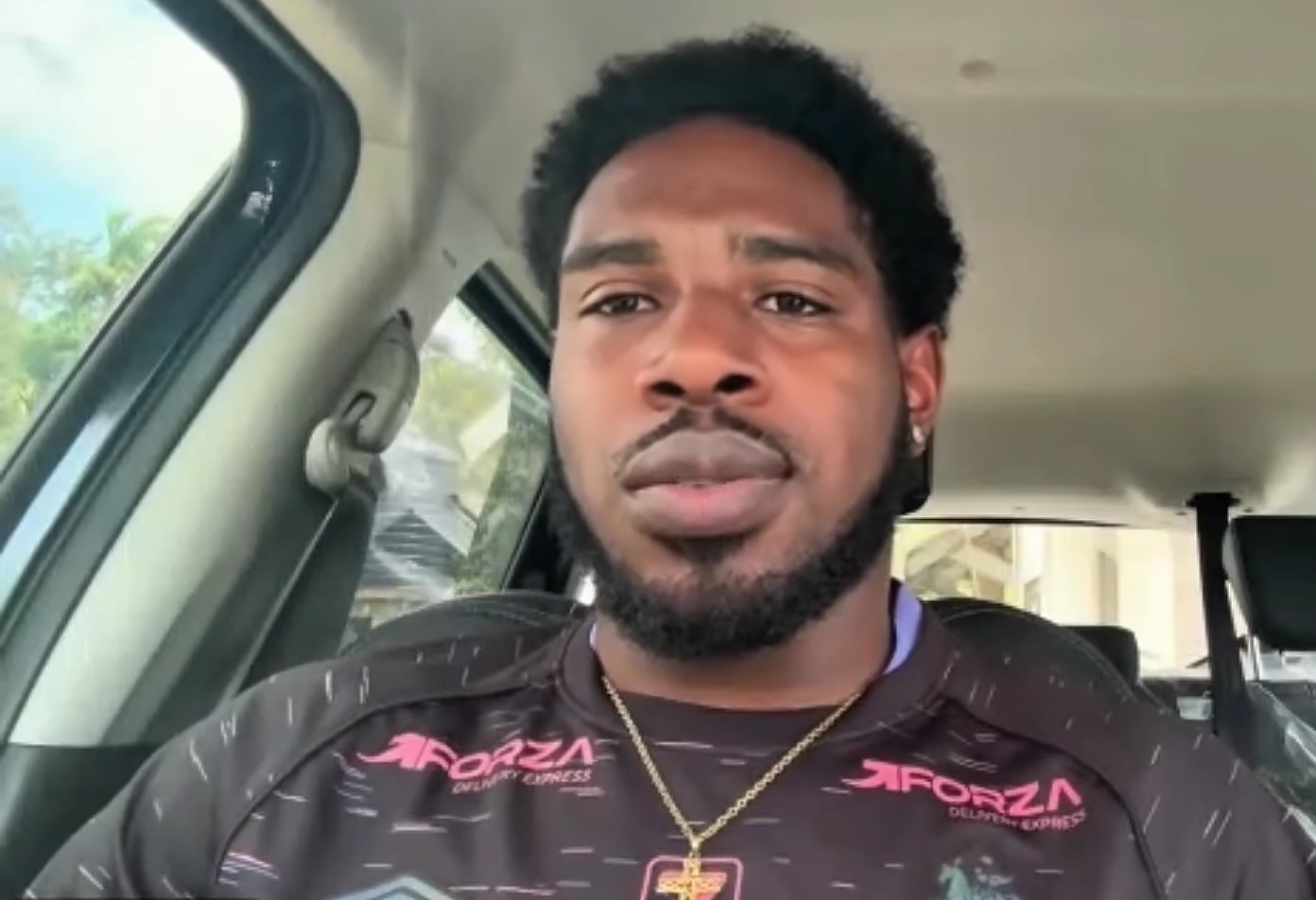
- Raymond in 2025

Personal information
- Full name: Andre Augustine Amos Raymond
- Date of birth: 9 November 2000 (age 26)
- Place of birth: Chaguanas, Trinidad and Tobago
- Height: 1.70 m (5 ft 7 in)
- Position: Defender

Team information
- Current team: Ilves
- Number: 23

Senior career*
Years	Team	Apps	(Gls)
2020–2021	Länk Vilaverdense	9	(0)
2021–2022	Castro Daire	20	(0)
2022–2023	Dumiense	16	(0)
2023–2024	Vilar de Perdizes	18	(0)
2024–2025	St Johnstone	17	(0)
2025	→ Dunfermline Athletic (loan)	5	(0)
2025–	Ilves	9	(0)

International career^{‡}
2023–	Trinidad and Tobago	13	(0)
- * Club domestic league appearances and goals as of 19 November 2025 ‡ National team caps and goals as of 13 August 2024

Andre Augustine Amos Raymond (born 9 November 2000) is a Trinidadian footballer who plays as a defender for Veikkausliiga club Ilves and the Trinidad and Tobago national team.

== Club career ==
In 2020, Raymond signed for Portuguese side Länk Vilaverdense. In 2021, he signed for Portuguese side Castro Daire, In 2022, he signed for Portuguese side Dumiense. In 2023, he signed for Portuguese side Vilar de Perdizes. In 2024, he signed for Scottish side St Johnstone.

On 15 July 2025, Raymond joined Ilves in Finnish Veikkausliiga for an undisclosed fee.

== International career ==
Raymond is a Trinidad and Tobago international. On 11 March 2023, he debuted for the Trinidad and Tobago national football team during a 1–0 win over Jamaica. He has played for the Trinidad and Tobago national football team during 2024 CONCACAF Nations League Finals and 2026 FIFA World Cup qualification.

== Style of play ==
Raymond mainly operates as a defender. He specifically operates as a left-back. He can also operate as a left winger or left midfielder. He is known for his speed.

== Personal life ==
Raymond was born on 9 November 2000 in Chaguanas, Trinidad and Tobago. He is a Christian.
