= John McLaughlan =

Scottish footballer and manager

Personal information
- Full name: John McLaughlan
- Date of birth: 22 April 1963 (age 63)
- Place of birth: Scotland
- Position: Midfielder

Senior career*
Years	Team	Apps	(Gls)
- Greenock Morton
- Partick Thistle
1983-1985	Hamilton Academical	16	(2)
1985-1986	Albion Rovers	1	(0)
- Shotts Bon Accord

Managerial career
- 2005-2021: Celtic U17
- 2007-2009: Celtic U20
- 2009-2021: Celtic Academy
- 2021-2023: Hearts Academy
- 2022-2023: Hearts U18
- 2024-: Dunfermline Academy
- 2024-2025: Dunfermline (caretaker)
- * Club domestic league appearances and goals

John McLaughlan (born 22 April 1963) is a Scottish former football player and current Head of Professional Development at Dunfermline.

== Playing career ==
McLaughlan played for Hamilton Academical, Partick Thistle and Greenock Morton.

== Coaching career ==
In 1996, McLaughlan was appointed as Coaching and Development manager at Livingston. McLaughlan was appointed as Head Youth Coach at Partick Thistle in 2003. He left the club in 2005 as Thistle attempted to cut costs.

Shortly after his departure from Firhill Stadium, McLaughlan joined the Celtic F.C. B Team and Academy team in 2005, covering the roles of U17, U20 and Academy Manager during a 17 year spell at the club.

He joined the Heart of Midlothian F.C. Reserves and Academy team in 2021, overseeing management duties with the U18 squad and Academy. McLaughlan left the club in 2023.

McLaughlan was appointed as Head of Professional Development at Dunfermline in June 2024.

Following the dismissal of James McPake as first team manager in December 2024, McLaughlan was appointed as Caretaker manager while the club sought a successor. He resumed his original duties with the Academy when Michael Tidser was appointed Manager in January 2025.
