= Tobi Oluwayemi =

English footballer (born 2003)

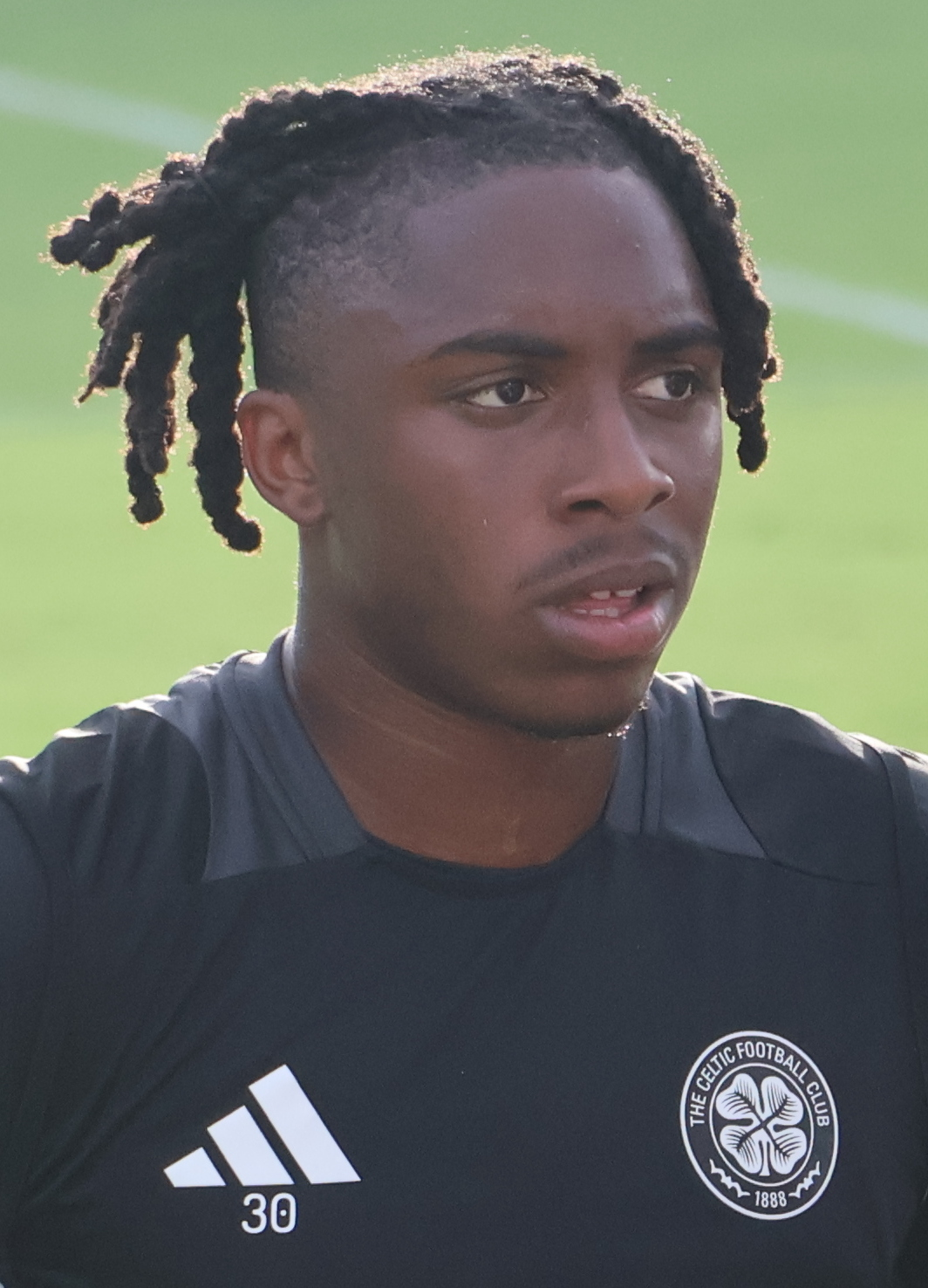
- Oluwayemi training with Celtic in 2024

Personal information
- Full name: Oluwatobiloba Oluwayemi
- Date of birth: 8 May 2003 (age 23)
- Place of birth: London, England
- Height: 1.83 m (6 ft 0 in)
- Position: Goalkeeper

Youth career
- 2019: Tottenham Hotspur
- 2019–2023: Celtic

Senior career*
Years	Team	Apps	(Gls)
2021–2023	Celtic B	13	(0)
2021–2026	Celtic	0	(0)
2023	→ Cork City (loan)	2	(0)
2023–2024	→ Admira Wacker (loan)	9	(0)
2024–2025	→ Dunfermline Athletic (loan)	30	(0)
2025–2026	→ Kilmarnock (loan)	12	(0)
2026	Leyton Orient	3	(0)

International career^{‡}
- England U15
2019	England U16	4	(0)
2019	England U17	2	(0)
2021	England U18	1	(0)
2021	England U19	2	(0)
2022	England U20	1	(0)
- * Club domestic league appearances and goals as of 22:37, 30 June 2026 (UTC) ‡ National team caps and goals as of 23:00, 24 September 2022 (UTC)

Oluwatobiloba "Tobi" Oluwayemi (born 8 May 2003) is an English professional footballer who last played as a goalkeeper for League One side Leyton Orient.

== Club career ==
=== Celtic ===
Born and raised in London to parents of Nigerian descent, Oluwayemi spent the first part of his youth career at Tottenham Hotspur's academy, before joining Celtic in July 2019, as he signed a three-year professional contract with the Scottish club.

After progressing through the youth ranks, in the first half of 2021 Oluwayemi started training with Celtic's first team, first under manager Neil Lennon and then, after his sacking, John Kennedy. In June of the same year, the goalkeeper renewed his contract with the club until June 2024.

During the 2021–22 season, following the appointment of Ange Postecoglou as Celtic's new manager, Oluwayemi effectively became the club's third-choice goalkeeper, behind Joe Hart and Scott Bain, being included in several match-day squads for UEFA Europa League and UEFA Europa Conference League games. He kept working in the first-team environment throughout the following campaign, as well, while keeping featuring both in the Lowland Football League (where he played for Celtic's B Team) and the UEFA Youth League.

On 13 January 2023, Oluwayemi joined newly promoted Irish side Cork City on loan until the end of June. He went on to make his professional debut on 17 February, starting and playing 90 minutes in Cork's first league game of the season, a 1–2 home defeat to Bohemians.

In August 2023, Oluwayemi joined Austrian 2. Liga side Admira Wacker on a season-long loan deal, making 9 appearances.

In August 2024, Oluwayemi went on season-long loan to Scottish Championship side Dunfermline Athletic. Despite missing several games through injury, Oluwayemi became first choice goalkeeper for the Pars.

On 22 October 2025, Oluwayemi signed for fellow Scottish Premiership club Kilmarnock on a 7-day emergency loan deal.

=== Leyton Orient ===
On 2 February 2026, Oluwayemi signed for League One club Leyton Orient on a short-term contract. On 7 May 2026, the club said it was releasing the player.

== International career ==
Thanks to his dual citizenship, Oluwayemi is eligible to represent either England or Nigeria internationally.

He has been a youth international for England, having played for all their set-ups from the under-15 to the under-20 national team.

== Style of play ==
Oluwayemi has been described as a strong and composed goalkeeper, who is mainly regarded for his shot-stopping abilities and his leadership, as well as his distribution. During his youth career, he originally played outfield before establishing himself in goal.

== Personal life ==
He has an older brother, Josh (b. 2001), who is also a goalkeeper: he similarly played for Tottenham's youth academy and represented England at several youth international levels.

== Career statistics ==
=== Club ===
As of match played 2 May 2025

Appearances and goals by club, season and competition
Club	Season	League			National cup (Note: Includes Scottish Cup and FAI Cup)		League cup (Note: Includes Scottish League Cup and Scottish Challenge Cup)		Europe (Note: Includes UEFA Europa Conference League)		Total	
Club	Season	Division	Apps	Goals	Apps	Goals	Apps	Goals	Apps	Goals	Apps	Goals
Celtic B	2021–22	Lowland League	—		—		0	0	—		0	0
Celtic B	2022–23	Lowland League	13	0	—		3	0	—		16	0
Celtic B	Total		13	0	—		3	0	—		16	0
Celtic	2021–22	Scottish Premiership	—		—		—		0	0	0	0
Cork City (loan)	2023	LOI Premier Division	2	0	0	0	—		—		2	0
Admira Wacker (loan)	2023–24	2. Liga	9	0	—		—		—		9	0
Dunfermline Athletic (loan)	2024-25	Scottish Championship	30	0	3	0	3	0	—		36	0
Career total			55	0	3	0	6	0	0	0	63	0
