= Owen Moffat =

Scottish footballer

Personal information
- Full name: Owen John Moffat
- Date of birth: 6 January 2002 (age 24)
- Place of birth: Stirling, Scotland
- Position: Winger

Team information
- Current team: East Kilbride
- Number: 33

Youth career
- 2009-2021: Celtic

Senior career*
Years	Team	Apps	(Gls)
2021–2022	Celtic	2	(0)
2022–2024	Blackpool	0	(0)
2023–2024	→ Dunfermline Athletic (loan)	28	(3)
2024–2026	Greenock Morton	70	(5)
2026–	East Kilbride	4	(0)
- * Club domestic league appearances and goals as of 27 August 2026

Owen John Moffat (born 6 January 2002) is a Scottish professional footballer who plays as a winger for Scottish League One club East Kilbride. Having advanced through the Celtic Youth Setup, he was also previously contracted to Blackpool, and had a spell on loan to Dunfermline Athletic. After leaving Blackpool, Moffat spent two years with Greenock Morton.

== Professional career ==
A youth product of Celtic since the age of 7, Moffat signed a professional contract with the club in 2019, and extended it on 6 January 2021. He made his professional debut with Celtic in a 2–1 Scottish Premiership win over Ross County on 15 December 2021. Four days later, on 19 December, he came in as a substitute in the Scottish League Cup Final, thus being involved in Celtic's final victory against Hibernian. Finally, on 22 December, he made his first league start against St Mirren. Throughout the 2021-22 season, the winger was also heavily involved with Celtic's B Team in the Lowland League, where he collected fourteen goals and eight assists in 31 games.

On 30 August 2022, Moffat joined English side Blackpool, initially as part of the club's development squad. He signed a three-year deal with the club, with an option for a further year.

On 18 June 2024, Moffat joined Scottish Championship club Greenock Morton on a two-year deal.

== Career statistics ==
As of match played 25 October 2025

Appearances and goals by club, season and competition
Club	Season	League			Scottish Cup		League Cup		Continental		Other		Total	
Club	Season	Division	Apps	Goals	Apps	Goals	Apps	Goals	Apps	Goals	Apps	Goals	Apps	Goals
Celtic B	2021–22	—			—		—		—		1 (Note: Appearance(s) in Scottish Challenge Cup)	0	1	0
Celtic B	2022–23	—			—		—		—		1	0	1	0
Celtic B	Total		—		—		—		—		2	0	2	0
Celtic	2021–22	Scottish Premiership	2	0	0	0	1	0	0	0	—		3	0
Blackpool	2022–23	Championship	0	0	0	0	0	0	—		—		0	0
Blackpool	2023–24	League One	0	0	0	0	0	0	—		0	0	0	0
Blackpool	Total		0	0	0	0	0	0	—		0	0	0	0
Dunfermline Athletic (loan)	2023–24	Scottish Championship	28	3	1	0	0	0	—		1	0	30	3
Greenock Morton	2024–25	Scottish Championship	34	4	1	0	4	1	—		3	0	42	5
Greenock Morton	2025–26	Scottish Championship	12	0	0	0	5	1	—		0	0	17	1
Greenock Morton	Total		46	4	1	0	9	2	—		3	0	59	6
Career total			76	7	2	0	10	2	0	0	6	0	94	9

== Honours ==
Celtic

- Scottish Premiership: 2021–22
- Scottish League Cup: 2021–22
