= Ben Summers =

Scottish footballer

Personal information
- Date of birth: 16 June 2004 (age 22)
- Place of birth: Hamilton, Scotland
- Position: Attacking midfielder

Team information
- Current team: Ayr United FC
- Number: 16

Youth career
- 2011–2021: Celtic B

Senior career*
Years	Team	Apps	(Gls)
2021–	Celtic B	41	(12)
2023–	Celtic	2	(0)
2023–2024	→ Dunfermline Athletic (loan)	20	(2)
2024–	→ Admira Wacker (loan)	19	(2)
2026–	→ Ayr United (loan)	15	(0)

International career^{‡}
2023–	Scotland U21	2	(0)
- * Club domestic league appearances and goals as of 4 May 2026 ‡ National team caps and goals as of 17:15, 17 April 2023 (UTC)

Ben Summers (born 16 June 2004) is a Scottish professional footballer who plays as an attacking midfielder for Ayr United on loan from Scottish Premiership club Celtic.

== Club career ==
Summers joined Celtic at the age of seven. He signed his first professional contract with the club in June 2020, which was extended in September 2022. On 18 March 2023, Summers was named on the bench for Celtic's 3–1 win against Hibernian. He made his Celtic debut on 16 April 2023, substituted on in the 88th minute, in a 4–1 win away to Kilmarnock.

== International career ==
Summers was included in the under-21 squad for the first time in March 2023. He made his debut on 23 March 2023 in a friendly match against Sweden.

== Honours ==
Celtic

- Scottish Premiership: 2022–23

== Career statistics ==
As of match played 16 April 2023

Appearances and goals by club, season and competition
Club	Season	League			National Cup		League Cup		Other		Total	
Club	Season	Division	Apps	Goals	Apps	Goals	Apps	Goals	Apps	Goals	Apps	Goals
Celtic B	2021–22	Lowland League	19	7	—		—		0	0	19	7
Celtic B	2022–23	Lowland League	22	5	—		—		2 (Note: Appearances in the Scottish Challenge Cup)	0	24	5
Celtic B	Total		41	12	0	0	0	0	2	0	43	12
Celtic	2022–23	Scottish Premiership	2	0	0	0	0	0	0	0	2	0
Career total			42	12	0	0	0	0	2	0	44	12
