= Devin Özek =

German football manager (born 1995)

Personal information
- Date of birth: 20 March 1995 (age 31)
- Place of birth: Munich, Germany

Team information
- Current team: Fenerbahçe (sporting director)

Managerial career
- Years: Team
- 2025–: Fenerbahçe (sporting director)

Devin Özek (born 20 March 1995) is a German professional football executive and manager who has held sporting roles at Fenerbahçe & Bayer Leverkusen.

== Early life ==
Devin Özek was born on 20 March 1995 in Germany (Munich). He played football in the lower German divisions before retiring from playing at the age of 21 in 2016, after which he moved into football management and scouting. He holds a UEFA B coaching licence and speaks German, Turkish, English & Spanish fluently.

== Career ==
=== Early career and Bayer Leverkusen ===
Özek began his career in football management in 2017 as a scout and football career manager at the agency Rolfes & Elsässer, which had close ties to Simon Rolfes, later Bayer Leverkusen's Sport CEO. He subsequently joined Bayer 04 Leverkusen's football department directly.

From June 2020 to August 2022, Özek worked at Bayer 04 Leverkusen as Head of Cooperation Clubs and Head of Top Talents / Scout. From September 2022 to May 2025, he served as Executive Assistant to the CEO Sport, working closely alongside Sport CEO Simon Rolfes on scouting, squad planning, coach searches and transfer strategy.

In this capacity, Özek was reported to have played a role in the club's recruitment of head coach Xabi Alonso, who led Leverkusen to their first Bundesliga title. Under Alonso, Leverkusen went unbeaten through the 2023–24 Bundesliga season and completed a domestic double, also winning the DFB-Pokal, while reaching the UEFA Europa League final. Transfers Özek was involved with at Leverkusen include the signings of Josip Stanišić (from FC Bayern Munich) and Victor Boniface, as well as outgoing deals such as Odilon Kossounou (to Atalanta), Moussa Diaby (to Aston Villa) and Sardar Azmoun (to Shabab Al-Ahli Dubai).

Speaking after his departure from the club, Özek described Florian Wirtz as "one of the best signings in Bundesliga history," crediting Sport CEO Simon Rolfes and CEO Fernando Carro for the signing and praising Wirtz as "an unbelievably intelligent player." He has said that a club's transfer strategy should be led by clearly defined footballing identity rather than by an individual head coach, stating that "the club [should] decide the identity, not the manager."

=== Fenerbahçe ===
On 6 June 2025, Fenerbahçe SK announced the appointment of Özek as Sporting Director, as part of a broader reorganisation of the club's football department; Özek succeeded Mario Branco in the role. At around 30 years old, he was reported by The Athletic (The New York Times) to be one of the youngest sporting directors working in top-level European football.

At Fenerbahçe, Özek has been credited with recruiting players including Edson Álvarez, Kerem Aktürkoğlu, Dorgeles Nene, Archie Brown and N'Golo Kanté, as well as several high-profile arrivals negotiated with Paris Saint-Germain (Marco Asensio and Milan Škriniar, with Nelson Semedo joining in the same window), Manchester City (Ederson) and Lazio (Matteo Guendouzi).

Head coach José Mourinho publicly praised his work, saying "Devin is doing really excellent work." Marco Asensio said that seeing "an ambitious project" at the club was a factor in his decision to join.

On 10 January 2026, Fenerbahçe won the Turkcell Süper Kupa, beating rivals Galatasaray 2–0 in the final at the Atatürk Olympic Stadium, with goals from Matteo Guendouzi and Jayden Oosterwolde.

==== Charitable initiative ====
In 2026, Özek launched a social responsibility initiative under which every new first-team signing donates one per cent of their gross salary to support disadvantaged and sick children; the club has said transfer talks will not proceed with a player who declines to take part. The initiative, described by the club as born "from the visionary idea of our sporting director, Devin Özek", was launched in memory of Özek's mother, Cornelia Özek.
