= 2018–19 Professional U18 Development League =

== U18 Premier League ==
U18 Premier League
- Season: 2018–19
- Champions: Derby County U18s (1st Title)
- Matches: 265
- Goals: 1,062 (4.01 per match)
- Top goalscorer: (England) Ellis Simms Everton U18s (32 Goals)
- Biggest home win: Arsenal U18s 8–0 Swansea City U18s (30 March 2019)
- Biggest away win: West Ham United U18s 0–9 Tottenham Hotspur U18s (22 September 2018)
- Highest scoring: Middlesbrough U18s 5–6 Liverpool U18s (1 December 2018)
- Longest winning run: 12 Matches – Arsenal U18s
- Longest unbeaten run: 18 Matches – Tottenham Hotspur U18s
- Longest winless run: 18 Matches – Sunderland U18s
- Longest losing run: 7 Matches – Norwich City U18s; Swansea City U18s; Wolverhampton Wanderers U18s

The 2018-19 Under-18 Premier League is the sixth campaign of the top tier of the Under-18 Development League. A total of 24 teams are split regionally into north and south leagues. Teams face their regional opponents both home and away before the top two face each other to determine the national champion. No teams were added this season. As a result, 22 games were played in both the North and South Divisions. Chelsea U18s are the two-time defending champions.

=== North ===
Pos	Team	Pld	W	D	L	GF	GA	GD	Pts	
1	Derby County U18s	22	16	3	3	63	27	+36	51	Qualification for the National Final
2	Liverpool U18s	22	16	3	3	59	32	+27	51	
3	Everton U18s	22	14	2	6	65	34	+31	44	
4	Manchester United U18s	22	12	7	3	60	39	+21	43	
5	Middlesbrough U18s	22	11	2	9	52	48	+4	35	
6	Stoke City U18s	22	10	2	10	42	39	+3	32	
7	Blackburn Rovers U18s	22	9	3	10	48	49	−1	30	
8	Manchester City U18s	22	7	8	7	46	34	+12	29	
9	West Bromwich Albion U18s	22	4	6	12	44	62	−18	18	
10	Wolverhampton Wanderers U18s	22	4	2	16	22	47	−25	14	
11	Newcastle United U18s	22	3	5	14	17	62	−45	14	
12	Sunderland U18s	22	1	7	14	20	65	−45	10	

Updated to match(es) played on unknown. Source: Premier League Under 18 Table

=== South ===
Pos	Team	Pld	W	D	L	GF	GA	GD	Pts	
1	Arsenal U18s	22	20	0	2	86	23	+63	60	Qualification for the National Final
2	Tottenham Hotspur U18s	22	18	2	2	81	26	+55	56	
3	Chelsea U18s	22	13	5	4	42	24	+18	44	
4	Southampton U18s	22	11	2	9	48	41	+7	35	
5	Brighton & Hove Albion U18s	22	11	1	10	40	37	+3	34	
6	Aston Villa U18s	22	9	2	11	44	47	−3	29	
7	Leicester City U18s	22	9	2	11	37	46	−9	29	
8	West Ham United U18s	22	9	2	11	38	52	−14	29	
9	Fulham U18s	22	6	6	10	36	45	−9	24	
10	Reading U18s	22	6	1	15	22	53	−31	19	
11	Swansea City U18s	22	3	3	16	19	53	−34	12	
12	Norwich City U18s	22	3	2	17	24	70	−46	11	

Updated to match(es) played on unknown. Source: Premier League Under 18 Table

=== National Final ===
7 May 2019
14:00

Derby County U18s	5–2	Arsenal U18s
Brown 14', 33', 66'; Whittaker 24', 90+2'	Report	Saka 5', 82'

Pride Park, Derby
Referee: Scott Tallis

=== Top goalscorers ===
As of 7 May 2019

Rank	Player	Club	Goals
1	(England) Ellis Simms	Everton	32
2	(United States) Folarin Balogun	Arsenal	25
3	(England) Morgan Whittaker	Derby County	19
4	(England) Bobby Duncan	Liverpool	18
5	(England) Mason Greenwood	Manchester United	15
6	(Wales) Christian Norton	Southampton	14
6	(Republic of Ireland) Troy Parrott	Tottenham Hotspur	14
7	(England) Gabriel McGill	Middlesbrough	13
8	(England) Kieran Phillips	Everton	12
9	(Nigeria) Korede Adedoyin	Everton	11
9	(Germany) Paul Glatzel	Liverpool	11
9	(England) Dilan Markanday	Tottenham Hotspur	11
10	(England) Sam Greenwood	Arsenal	10
10	(Scotland) Jack Stretton	Derby County	10
10	(Switzerland) Lorent Tolaj	Brighton & Hove Albion	10
10	(Republic of Ireland) Ethon Varian	Stoke City	10

=== Hat-tricks ===
As of 7 May 2019

Player	For	Against	Result	Date	Ref.
(Republic of Ireland) James Jennings	Stoke City U18s	Blackburn Rovers U18s	3–2 (H)	11 August 2018	
(Uganda) Jayden Onen	Brighton & Hove Albion U18s	Tottenham Hotspur U18s	6–4 (A)	11 August 2018	
(Brazil) Bernardo Rosa	West Ham United U18s	Norwich City U18s	1–4 (A)	11 August 2018	
(England) Henri Ogunby	Manchester City U18s	Newcastle United U18s	6–0 (H)	11 August 2018	
(England) J'Neil Bennett	Tottenham Hotspur U18s	Swansea City U18s	1–5 (A)	18 August 2018	
(England) Tyreece John-Jules	Arsenal U18s	Leicester City U18s	7–0 (H)	25 August 2018	
(Germany) Paul Glatzel	Liverpool U18s	West Bromwich Albion U18s	5–1 (H)	25 August 2018	
(England) Ellis Simms^{4}	Everton U18s	Blackburn Rovers U18s	0–6 (A)	8 September 2018	
(England) Mason Greenwood	Manchester United U18s	Blackburn Rovers U18s	4–3 (H)	15 September 2018	
(England) Kieran Phillips	Everton U18s	Manchester City U18s	0–3 (A)	22 September 2018	
(Republic of Ireland) Jack Stretton^{4}	Derby County U18s	Newcastle United U18s	0–8 (A)	22 September 2018	
(England) Sonny Hilton	Fulham U18s	Reading U18s	7–0 (H)	6 October 2018	
(United States) Folarin Balogun	Arsenal U18s	Reading U18s	4–2 (H)	20 October 2018	
(England) Ellis Simms^{4}	Everton U18s	Newcastle United U18s	7–1 (H)	20 October 2018	
(Nigeria) Korede Adedoyin	Everton U18s	Newcastle United U18s	7–1 (H)	20 October 2018	
(England) Ryan Longman	Brighton & Hove Albion U18s	Aston Villa U18s	0–3 (A)	3 November 2018	
(England) Stephen Walker	Middlesbrough U18s	Liverpool U18s	5–6 (H)	1 December 2018	
(England) Bobby Duncan^{4}	Liverpool U18s	Middlesbrough U18s	5–6 (A)	1 December 2018	
(England) Tyreece John-Jules	Arsenal U18s	Leicester City U18s	0–5 (A)	19 February 2019	
(United States) Folarin Balogun	Arsenal U18s	Norwich City U18s	6–2 (H)	2 March 2019	
(England) Bobby Duncan	Liverpool U18s	Blackburn Rovers U18s	7–2 (H)	2 March 2019	
(England) Gabriel McGill	Middlesbrough U18s	Sunderland U18s	2–8 (A)	2 March 2019	
(England) Ellis Simms	Everton U18s	West Bromwich Albion U18s	1–3 (A)	16 March 2019	
(England) Ellis Simms	Everton U18s	Wolverhampton Wanderers U18s	2–3 (A)	23 March 2019	
(England) Trae Coyle	Arsenal U18s	Swansea City U18s	8–0 (H)	30 March 2019	
(United States) Folarin Balogun^{4}	Arsenal U18s	Reading U18s	0–8 (A)	6 April 2019	
(England) Ellis Simms^{4}	Everton U18s	Sunderland U18s	6–0 (H)	13 April 2019	
(England) D'Mani Mellor	Manchester United U18s	Everton U18s	4–5 (H)	27 April 2019	
(England) Archie Brown	Derby County U18s	Arsenal U18s	5–2 (H)	7 May 2019	

Note

(H) – Home; (A) – Away
^{4} – player scored 4 goals

== Professional Development League 2 ==
U18 Professional Development League 2
- Season: 2018–19
- Champions: Sheffield Wednesday U18s (1st title)
- Matches: 283 (280 RS, 3 PO)
- Goals: 1,053 (3.72 per match) (1,044 RS, 9 PO)
- Top goalscorer: (Wales) Dan Griffiths Cardiff City U18s (19 Goals)
- Biggest home win: Barnsley U18s 7–1 Crewe Alexandra U18s (6 October 2018); Queens Park Rangers U18s 7–1 Colchester United U18s (3 November 2018); Charlton Athletic U18s 6–0 Coventry City U18s (5 January 2019); Sheffield Wednesday U18s 6–0 Crewe Alexandra U18s (16 February 2019); Charlton Athletic U18s 6–0 Colchester United U18s (16 February 2019); Nottingham Forest U18s 7–1 Coventry City U18s (6 April 2019); Leeds United U18s 6–0 Colchester United U18s (6 April 2019)
- Biggest away win: Colchester United U18s 0–7 Millwall U18s (8 December 2018)
- Highest scoring: Leeds United U18s 6–5 Crystal Palace U18s (21 December 2018)
- Longest winning run: 6 Matches – Ipswich Town U18s (23 February 2019 – 30 March 2019); Leeds United U18s (24 November 2018 – 26 January 2019)
- Longest unbeaten run: 9 Matches – Sheffield Wednesday U18s (11 August 2018 – 13 October 2018), (4 January 2019 – 6 April 2019)
- Longest winless run: 23 Matches – Colchester United U18s (11 August 2018 – 9 March 2019)
- Longest losing run: 7 Matches – Crewe Alexandra U18s (5 January 2019 – 9 March 2019)

The U18 Professional Development League 2 season is the seventh campaign of post-EPPP Under-18 football's second tier, designed for those academies with Category 2 status. A total of 20 teams are split regionally into north and south divisions, with each team facing opponents in their own region twice both home and away and opponents in the other region once for a total of 28 games. The sides finishing in the top two positions in both regions at the end of the season will progress to a knockout stage to determine the overall league champion. Charlton Athletic U18s are the defending champions. Huddersfield Town U18s dropped out of the league at the end of the 2017-18 campaign as part of their academy restructuring process.

=== Tables ===
==== North Division ====
Pos	Team	Pld	W	D	L	GF	GA	GD	Pts	Qualification
1	Sheffield Wednesday U18s	28	17	8	3	69	22	+47	59	Qualification for Knock-out stage
2	Leeds United U18s	28	19	2	7	66	37	+29	59	Qualification for Knock-out stage
3	Nottingham Forest U18s	28	15	5	8	59	33	+26	50	
4	Sheffield United U18s	28	14	8	6	48	38	+10	50	
5	Burnley U18s	28	15	4	9	64	54	+10	49	
6	Barnsley U18s	28	12	5	11	47	45	+2	41	
7	Birmingham City U18s	28	12	3	13	55	57	−2	39	
8	Hull City U18s	26	8	5	13	44	51	−7	29	
9	Bolton Wanderers U18s	28	7	5	16	49	72	−23	26	
10	Crewe Alexandra U18s	28	7	5	16	43	77	−34	26	

==== South Division ====
Pos	Team	Pld	W	D	L	GF	GA	GD	Pts	Qualification
1	Cardiff City U18s	28	17	3	8	61	31	+30	54	Qualification for Knock-out stage
2	Ipswich Town U18s	28	17	2	9	68	52	+16	53	Qualification for Knock-out stage
3	Millwall U18s	28	13	6	9	62	40	+22	45	
4	Queens Park Rangers U18s	28	13	3	12	53	51	+2	42	
5	Crystal Palace U18s	28	11	5	12	51	54	−3	38	
6	Charlton Athletic U18s	28	10	5	13	46	46	0	35	
7	Bristol City U18s	28	11	2	15	42	50	−8	35	
8	Watford U18s	28	8	7	13	50	63	−13	31	
9	Coventry City U18s	28	6	6	16	33	69	−36	24	
10	Colchester United U18s	28	1	5	22	34	102	−68	8	

=== Knock-out stage ===
Semi-finals

27 April 2019

Sheffield Wednesday U18s	1–0	Ipswich Town U18s
Grant 34' (pen.)

Hillsborough Stadium, Sheffield
27 April 2019

Cardiff City U18s	2–1	Leeds United U18s
Patten 22'; Griffiths 40'		Haugland 70'

Cardiff City Stadium, Cardiff

Professional Development League Two Play-Off Final

3 May 2019

Sheffield Wednesday U18s	3–2	Cardiff City U18s
Hagan 27'; Reaney 42'; Vasalo 80'		Griffiths 79'; Margetson 82'

Hillsborough Stadium, Sheffield
Referee: Mark Reeves

=== Top goalscorers ===
As of 3 May 2019

Rank	Player	Club	Goals
1	(Wales) Dan Griffiths	Cardiff City U18s	19
2	(England) Charles Hagan	Sheffield Wednesday U18s	15
3	(England) George Alexander	Millwall U18s	14
3	(Portugal) Brandon Aveiro	Crystal Palace U18s	14
3	(England) Zak Brown	Ipswich Town U18s	14
3	(England) Michael Fowler	Burnley U18s	14
3	(England) Will Swan	Nottingham Forest U18s	14
8	(Lebanon) Eyad Hammoud	Sheffield Wednesday U18s	13
9	(England) Adan George	Birmingham City U18s	12
9	(Wales) Niall Huggins	Leeds United U18s	12
9	(England) Kareem Isiaka	Charlton Athletic U18s	12
9	(England) Harry Taylor	Millwall U18s	12
9	(England) Tommy Willard	Barnsley U18s	12

=== Hat-tricks ===
As of 3 May 2019

Player	For	Against	Result	Date	Ref.
(England) George Alexander	Millwall U18s	Birmingham City U18s	4–0 (H)	1 September 2018	
(England) Jordan O'Brien	Sheffield Wednesday U18s	Crystal Palace U18s	0–5 (A)	1 September 2018	
(England) Jaheim Rose	Queens Park Rangers U18s	Bolton Wanderers U18s	4–1 (H)	1 September 2018	
(England) Zak Brown	Ipswich Town U18s	Charlton Athletic U18s	3–6 (A)	15 September 2018	
(Portugal) Brandon Aveiro	Crystal Palace U18s	Watford U18s	4–2 (H)	15 September 2018	
(England) George Alexander	Millwall U18s	Coventry City U18s	3–1 (H)	22 September 2018	
(England) Eddie Brown	Bolton Wanderers U18s	Sheffield United U18s	4–1 (H)	22 September 2018	
(England) Tommy Hughes	Ipswich Town U18s	Colchester United U18s	3–3 (A)	13 October 2018	
(England) George Alexander	Millwall U18s	Colchester United U18s	6–1 (H)	20 October 2018	
(England) Harry Taylor	Millwall U18s	Colchester United U18s	6–1 (H)	20 October 2018	
(Lebanon) Eyad Hammoud	Sheffield Wednesday U18s	Burnley U18s	4–1 (H)	3 November 2018	
(England) Lewis Richardson^{5}	Burnley U18s	Crewe Alexandra U18s	6–1 (H)	16 November 2018	
(England) Rob Guilfoyle	Hull City U18s	Bolton Wanderers U18s	6–2 (H)	5 January 2019	
(Wales) Niall Huggins	Leeds United U18s	Crewe Alexandra U18s	3–0 (H)	12 January 2019	
(Wales) Sion Spence	Cardiff City U18s	Bristol City U18s	5–0 (H)	9 February 2019	
(England) Sean Robertson	Crystal Palace U18s	Watford U18s	1–4 (A)	9 February 2019	
(England) Charles Hagan	Sheffield Wednesday U18s	Crewe Alexandra U18s	6–0 (H)	16 February 2019	
(Portugal) Brandon Aveiro^{4}	Crystal Palace U18s	Birmingham City U18s	4–1 (H)	9 March 2019	
(England) Harry Taylor	Millwall U18s	Queens Park Rangers U18s	6–1 (H)	23 March 2019	
(England) Shaun O'Brien	Millwall U18s	Queens Park Rangers U18s	6–1 (H)	23 March 2019	
(United States) Vaughn Covil	Nottingham Forest U18s	Watford U18s	0–4 (A)	30 March 2019	
(England) Louis Britton	Bristol City U18s	Watford U18s	4–1 (H)	2 April 2019	
(England) Jayden Reid	Crystal Palace U18s	Coventry City U18s	3–1 (H)	2 April 2019	
(Ghana) Keith Asare	Nottingham Forest U18s	Coventry City U18s	7–1 (H)	6 April 2019	
(England) Will Swan	Nottingham Forest U18s	Coventry City U18s	7–1 (H)	6 April 2019	
(England) Edu Toiny-Pendred	Watford U18s	Bolton Wanderers U18s	2–4 (H)	6 April 2019	

Note

(H) – Home; (A) – Away
^{4} – player scored 4 goals ^{5} – player scored 5 goals

== League 3 ==
Football League Youth Alliance
- Season: 2018-19
- Champions: North-East Division; Grimsby Town U18s; North-West Division; Wigan Athletic U18s; South-East Division; Northampton Town U18s; South-West Division; Oxford United U18s; Merit League One; Southend United U18s; Merit League Two; Forest Green Rovers U18s
- Matches: 669
- Goals: 2,419 (3.62 per match)
- Top goalscorer: (England) Matt Rush Southend United U18s (20 Goals)

League 3 is run by the Football League under the auspices of the Football League Youth Alliance. 49 teams competed this season. Dagenham & Redbridge U18s and York City U18s would not return for this season. However, Huddersfield Town U18s would join the league as a Category 4 academy due to the restructuring of their academy.

=== League stage ===
As of match played 27 April 2019

==== North-East Division ====
Pos	Team	Pld	W	D	L	GF	GA	GD	Pts
1	Grimsby Town U18s (C)	24	13	7	4	43	23	+20	46
2	Doncaster Rovers U18s	24	13	5	6	54	33	+21	44
3	Bradford City U18s	24	12	7	5	39	29	+10	43
4	Mansfield Town U18s	24	12	4	8	58	36	+22	40
5	Hartlepool United U18s	24	12	4	8	40	32	+8	40
6	Burton Albion U18s	24	11	4	9	42	34	+8	37
7	Lincoln City U18s	24	9	6	9	36	41	−5	33
8	Oldham Athletic U18s	24	9	4	11	47	46	+1	31
9	Notts County U18s	24	8	6	10	36	37	−1	30
10	Chesterfield U18s	24	9	3	12	39	44	−5	30
11	Rotherham United U18s	24	8	4	12	42	55	−13	28
12	Scunthorpe United U18s	24	7	2	15	29	55	−26	23
13	Huddersfield Town U18s	24	4	2	18	26	66	−40	14

Source: soccerway.com
(C) Champions

==== North-West Division ====
Pos	Team	Pld	W	D	L	GF	GA	GD	Pts
1	Wigan Athletic U18s (C)	26	19	5	2	79	20	+59	62
2	Rochdale U18s	26	16	3	7	71	44	+27	51
3	Preston North End U18s	26	13	6	7	53	42	+11	45
4	Bury U18s	26	13	4	9	52	43	+9	43
5	Blackpool U18s	26	11	7	8	60	56	+4	40
6	Fleetwood Town U18s	26	10	7	9	39	31	+8	37
7	Tranmere Rovers U18s	26	9	8	9	33	34	−1	35
8	Wrexham U18s	26	8	9	9	35	43	−8	33
9	Shrewsbury Town U18s	26	8	8	10	45	54	−9	32
10	Morecambe U18s	26	7	6	13	31	50	−19	27
11	Carlisle United U18s	26	7	5	14	35	51	−16	26
12	Walsall U18s	26	6	7	13	27	41	−14	25
13	Accrington Stanley U18s	26	7	4	15	40	56	−16	25
14	Port Vale U18s	26	8	1	17	40	75	−35	25

Source: soccerway.com
(C) Champions

==== South-East Division ====
Pos	Team	Pld	W	D	L	GF	GA	GD	Pts	Qualification
1	Northampton Town U18s (C)	20	16	2	2	46	19	+27	50	Merit League One
2	Peterborough United U18s	20	11	4	5	46	30	+16	37	Merit League One
3	Southend United U18s	20	10	4	6	65	39	+26	34	Merit League One
4	Stevenage U18s	20	9	6	5	35	31	+4	33	Merit League One
5	Luton Town U18s	20	9	4	7	35	35	0	31	Merit League One
6	AFC Wimbledon U18s	20	8	4	8	36	40	−4	28	Merit League One
7	Cambridge United U18s	20	7	3	10	31	32	−1	24	Merit League Two
8	Gillingham U18s	20	6	5	9	36	37	−1	23	Merit League Two
9	Barnet U18s	20	7	2	11	40	51	−11	23	Merit League Two
10	Milton Keynes Dons U18s	20	5	3	12	30	47	−17	18	Merit League Two
11	Leyton Orient U18s	20	2	3	15	22	61	−39	9	Merit League Two

Source: soccerway.com
(C) Champions

==== South-West Division ====
Pos	Team	Pld	W	D	L	GF	GA	GD	Pts	Qualification
1	Oxford United U18s (C)	20	14	5	1	55	23	+32	47	Merit League One
2	AFC Bournemouth U18s	20	11	7	2	52	28	+24	40	Merit League One
3	Exeter City U18s	20	11	1	8	39	31	+8	34	Merit League One
4	Yeovil Town U18s	20	9	3	8	35	28	+7	30	Merit League One
5	Swindon Town U18s	20	9	3	8	42	45	−3	30	Merit League One
6	Portsmouth U18s	20	8	5	7	46	44	+2	29	Merit League One
7	Cheltenham Town U18s	20	9	2	9	36	43	−7	29	Merit League Two
8	Bristol Rovers U18s	20	7	4	9	40	42	−2	25	Merit League Two
9	Forest Green Rovers U18s	20	6	5	9	35	44	−9	23	Merit League Two
10	Plymouth Argyle U18s	20	3	4	13	21	40	−19	13	Merit League Two
11	Newport County U18s	20	2	3	15	29	62	−33	9	Merit League Two

Source: soccerway.com
(C) Champions

=== Merit League Stage ===
The teams in the Southeast and Southwest Divisions played another ten games to determine the champions of Merit League One and Merit League Two.

==== Merit League One ====
Pos	Team	Pld	W	D	L	GF	GA	GD	Pts
1	Southend United U18s (C)	11	7	2	2	24	17	+7	23
2	AFC Wimbledon U18s	11	5	5	1	25	16	+9	20
3	Swindon Town U18s	11	6	2	3	23	18	+5	20
4	Oxford United U18s	11	6	2	3	21	16	+5	20
5	Peterborough United U18s	11	4	3	4	23	26	−3	15
6	Northampton Town U18s	11	4	2	5	23	26	−3	14
7	Portsmouth U18s	11	3	4	4	18	17	+1	13
8	Yeovil Town U18s	11	3	4	4	13	15	−2	13
9	AFC Bournemouth U18s	11	2	5	4	17	22	−5	11
10	Stevenage U18s	11	2	4	5	15	18	−3	10
11	Exeter City U18s	11	2	4	5	18	22	−4	10
12	Luton Town U18s	11	1	5	5	15	22	−7	8

Source: soccerway.com
(C) Champions

==== Merit League Two ====
Pos	Team	Pld	W	D	L	GF	GA	GD	Pts
1	Forest Green Rovers U18s (C)	9	6	2	1	24	10	+14	20
2	Plymouth Argyle U18s	9	6	2	1	24	10	+14	20
3	Bristol Rovers U18s	9	5	2	2	15	11	+4	17
4	Milton Keynes Dons U18s	9	5	1	3	23	13	+10	16
5	Cheltenham Town U18s	9	4	1	4	14	16	−2	13
6	Barnet U18s	9	3	2	4	12	18	−6	11
7	Cambridge United U18s	9	2	3	4	18	15	+3	9
8	Gillingham U18s	9	2	3	4	9	16	−7	9
9	Newport County U18s	9	2	2	5	11	23	−12	8
10	Leyton Orient U18s	9	1	0	8	11	29	−18	3

Source: soccerway.com
(C) Champions

== See also ==
- 2018–19 in English football
