= 2020–21 Dunfermline Athletic F.C. season =

Dunfermline Athletic
2020–21 season
- Chairman: Ross McArthur
- Manager: Stevie Crawford
- Stadium: East End Park; Dunfermline, Scotland (Capacity: 11,480)
- Championship: Fourth
- League Cup: Quarter Final, lost to St Johnstone
- Scottish Cup: Second Round, lost to Greenock Morton
- Top goalscorer: League: Declan McManus (9); All: Kevin O'Hara (11)
- Average home league attendance: 0 (Note: No fans were admitted into stadiums during the 2020–21 season due to the COVID-19 pandemic)
- Biggest win: League: Alloa Athletic 1–4 Dunfermline Athletic (24 October 2020); Dunfermline Athletic 4–1 Raith Rovers (3 February 2021); Cup: Kilmarnock 0–3 Dunfermline Athletic (13 October 2020)
- Biggest defeat: League: Raith Rovers 5–1 Dunfermline Athletic (30 March 2021); Cup: None
Home colours	Away colours
- All statistics correct as of 8 May 2021.

The 2020–21 season was Dunfermline Athletic's fifth season in the Scottish Championship, having finished 6th in the 2019–20 season.

== Squad list ==
As of 4 May 2021

No.	Name	Nationality	Position	Date of birth (age)	Signed from	Signed in	Signed until	Apps.	Goals
Goalkeepers
1	Owain Fôn Williams	(Wales)	GK	17 March 1987 (age 39)	Hamilton Academical	2020	2022	32	0
20	Cammy Gill	(Scotland)	GK	7 April 1998 (age 28)	Dunfermline Athletic youth teams	2016	2021	19	0
30	Ben Swinton	(Scotland)	GK	6 June 2001 (age 25)	Raith Rovers	2019	2021	0	0
Defenders
2	Aaron Comrie	(Scotland)	DF	3 February 1997 (age 29)	St Johnstone	2019	2021	55	1
3	Josh Edwards	(Scotland)	DF	27 May 2000 (age 26)	Airdrieonians	2019	2021	42	0
4	Lewis Martin	(Scotland)	DF	8 April 1996 (age 30)	Dunfermline Athletic youth teams	2012	2021	164	5
5	Euan Murray	(Scotland)	DF	20 January 1996 (age 30)	Raith Rovers	2019	2021	33	7
6	Kyle MacDonald	(Scotland)	DF	11 January 2000 (age 26)	Airdrieonians	2021	2023	4	0
13	Vytas Gašpuitis	(Lithuania)	DF	4 March 1994 (age 32)	(Lithuania) Panevėžys	2021	2023	7	0
17	Matthew Bowman	(England)	DF	26 November 2000 (age 25)	(England) Scarborough Athletic	2019	2021	1	0
19	Miller Fenton	(Scotland)	DF	16 October 2003 (age 22)	Fife Elite Football Academy	2019	2021	0	0
22	Lewis Mayo	(Scotland)	DF	19 March 2000 (age 26)	Rangers (loan)	2020	2021	24	0
44	Paul Watson	(Scotland)	DF	20 December 1990 (age 35)	Dundee United	2020	2022	27	2
Midfielders
8	Ewan Henderson	(Scotland)	MF	20 March 2000 (age 26)	Celtic	2021	2021	9	1
11	Ryan Dow	(Scotland)	MF	7 June 1991 (age 35)	Peterhead	2019	2021	35	8
12	Scott Cusick	(Scotland)	MF	8 August 2002 (age 24)	Celtic	2020	2021	0	0
15	Iain Wilson	(Scotland)	MF	15 December 1999 (age 26)	Kilmarnock	2020	2022	27	0
16	Steven Whittaker	(Scotland)	DF	16 June 1984 (age 42)	Hibernian	2020	2021	23	0
18	Paul Allan	(Scotland)	MF	7 February 2000 (age 26)	Fife Elite Football Academy	2017	2022	2	0
21	Fraser Murray	(Scotland)	MF	7 May 1999 (age 27)	Hibernian (loan)	2020	2021	30	6
23	Dom Thomas	(Scotland)	MF	14 February 1996 (age 30)	Kilmarnock	2020	2022	29	1
24	Kerr McInroy	(Scotland)	MF	31 August 2000 (age 26)	Celtic (loan)	2020	2021	22	0
25	Scott Banks	(Scotland)	MF	26 September 2001 (age 24)	Crystal Palace (loan)	2021	2021	12	0
26	Matty Todd	(Scotland)	MF	14 June 2001 (age 25)	Fife Elite Football Academy	2018	2022	15	0
27	Lucas Berry	(Scotland)	MF	23 February 2002 (age 24)	Fife Elite Football Academy	2019	2021	0	0
—	Kyle Turner	(Scotland)	MF	10 November 1997 (age 28)	Stranraer	2019	2021	40	5
Forwards
7	Kevin O'Hara	(Scotland)	FW	11 August 1998 (age 28)	Alloa Athletic	2020	2023	32	11
9	Craig Wighton	(Scotland)	FW	27 July 1997 (age 29)	Heart of Midlothian	2021	2021	11	6
10	Declan McManus	(Scotland)	FW	3 August 1994 (age 32)	Ross County	2020	2022	69	19
14	Lewis McCann	(Northern Ireland)	FW	7 June 2001 (age 25)	Fife Elite Football Academy	2018	2022	31	0
—	Gabby McGill	(England)	FW	9 April 2000 (age 26)	(England) Middlesbrough	2019	2021	20	1

== Results & fixtures ==
Win Draw Loss Postponed

=== Pre-season ===
19 September 2020 Friendly	Stenhousemuir	1 – 1	Dunfermline Athletic	Stenhousemuir, Scotland
14:00	Spence 7' (pen.)	Match report	Trialist 29'	Stadium: Ochilview Park; Attendance: 0 Referee: Dickinson

22 September 2020 Friendly	The Spartans	0 – 3	Dunfermline Athletic	Edinburgh, Scotland
19:45		Match report	Thomas 12'; McInroy 51', 85'	Stadium: Ainslie Park; Attendance: 0

26 September 2020 Friendly	East Fife	0 – 1	Dunfermline Athletic	Methil, Scotland
14:00		Match report	O'Hara 3'	Stadium: Bayview Stadium; Attendance: 0

2 October 2020 Friendly	Stirling Albion	0 – 0	Dunfermline Athletic	Alloa, Scotland
20:00		Match report		Stadium: Recreation Park; Attendance: 0

=== Scottish Championship ===
17 October 2020 Match 1	Dunfermline Athletic	3 – 1	Inverness CT	Dunfermline, Scotland
15:00	E. Murray 23'; Dow 78'; McManus 84'	BBC Sport report	Todorov 2'	Stadium: East End Park; Attendance: 0 Referee: Collum

24 October 2020 Match 2	Alloa Athletic	1 – 4	Dunfermline Athletic	Alloa, Scotland
15:00	Cawley 45+1'	BBC Sport report	Dow 78'; O'Hara 67', 77', 90' (pen.)	Stadium: Recreation Park; Attendance: 0 Referee: Robertson

31 October 2020 Match 3	Dunfermline Athletic	3 – 2	Queen of the South	Dunfermline, Scotland
15:00	E. Murray 21'; McManus 43' (pen.); Watson 60'	BBC Sport report	McKee 51'; Dobbie 74' (pen.)	Stadium: East End Park; Attendance: 0

7 November 2020 Match 4	Ayr United	0 – 0	Dunfermline Athletic	Ayr, Scotland
15:00		BBC Sport report		Stadium: Somerset Park; Attendance: 0 Referee: Craig Napier

20 November 2020 Match 5	Dunfermline Athletic	2 – 1	Heart of Midlothian	Dunfermline, Scotland
19:05	Thomas 49'; E. Murray 54'	BBC Sport report	Kingsley 84'	Stadium: East End Park; Attendance: 0 Referee: Don Robertson

5 December 2020 Match 6	Raith Rovers	2 – 2	Dunfermline Athletic	Kirkcaldy, Scotland
15:00	Duku 28'; Musonda 65'	BBC Sport report	F Murray 73'; McManus 74'	Stadium: Stark's Park; Attendance: 0 Referee: Euan Anderson

12 December 2020 Match 7	Dunfermline Athletic	1 – 2	Greenock Morton	Dunfermline, Scotland
15:00	McManus 74' (pen.)	BBC Sport report	McAlister 24'; McGuffie 79'	Stadium: East End Park; Attendance: 0 Referee: David Munro

19 December 2020 Match 8	Dundee	3 – 3	Dunfermline Athletic	Dundee, Scotland
15:00	Adam 35'; Sow 50'; Fontaine 70'	BBC Sport report	Watson 78'; McManus 82' (pen.), 90+3'	Stadium: Dens Park; Attendance: 0 Referee: Grant Irvine

26 December 2020 Match 9	Dunfermline Athletic	1 – 0	Arbroath	Dunfermline, Scotland
15:00	O'Hara 90+1'	BBC Sport report		Stadium: East End Park; Attendance: 0 Referee: Steven Kirkland

29 December 2020 Match 10	Inverness CT	1 – 1	Dunfermline Athletic	Inverness, Scotland
19:45	Storey 67'	BBC Sport report	Turner 23'	Stadium: Caledonian Stadium; Attendance: 0 Referee: Euan Anderson

15 January 2021 Match 12	Greenock Morton	0 – 0	Dunfermline Athletic	Greenock
19:30		BBC Sport report		Stadium: Cappielow; Attendance: 0 Referee: Steven Kirkland

23 January 2020 Match 13	Dunfermline Athletic	0 – 0	Ayr United	Dunfermline, Scotland
15:00		BBC Sport Report		Stadium: East End Park; Attendance: 0 Referee: Don Robertson

30 January 2021 Match 11 (Note: Rearranged match after postponement)	Heart of Midlothian	1 – 0	Dunfermline Athletic	Edinburgh
15:00	Walker 81'	BBC Sport report		Stadium: Tynecastle Park; Attendance: 0 Referee: William Collum

3 February 2020 Match 14	Dunfermline Athletic	4 – 1	Raith Rovers	Dunfermline, Scotland
19:30	McManus 44'; Comrie 51'; F. Murray 66', 87'	BBC Sport Report	Spencer 64'	Stadium: East End Park; Attendance: 0 Referee: Don Robertson

6 February 2021 Match 15	Arbroath	2 – 0	Dunfermline Athletic	Arbroath
15:00	O'Brien 27'; Hilson 36'	BBC Sport report		Stadium: Gayfield Park; Attendance: 0 Referee: Craig Napier

20 February 2020 Match 16	Dunfermline Athletic	2 – 1	Alloa Athletic	Dunfermline, Scotland
15:00	Wighton 14', 58'	BBC Sport Report	Cawley 44'	Stadium: East End Park; Attendance: 0 Referee: Steven Reid

27 February 2021 Match 17	Queen of the South	1 – 0	Dunfermline Athletic	Dumfries
15:00	Gibson 50'	BBC Sport report	Mayo (red card) 90'	Stadium: Palmerston Park; Attendance: 0 Referee: Mike Roncone

13 March 2021 Match 19	Dunfermline Athletic	1 – 0	Greenock Morton	Dunfermline, Scotland
15:00	Wighton 44'	BBC Sport Report		Stadium: East End Park; Attendance: 0 Referee: Steven Kirkland

20 March 2021 Match 20	Inverness CT	1 – 0	Dunfermline Athletic	Inverness, Scotland
15:00	Carson 81'	BBC Sport report		Stadium: Caledonian Stadium; Attendance: 0 Referee: Peter Stuart

27 March 2021 Match 21	Dundee	3 – 2	Dunfermline Athletic	Dundee, Scotland
19:20	Cummings 30'; Mullen 54'; Ashcroft 56'	BBC Sport report	O'Hara 3'; Wighton 6'	Stadium: Dens Park; Attendance: 0 Referee: Bobby Madden

30 March 2021 Match 22	Raith Rovers	5 – 1	Dunfermline Athletic	Kirkcaldy, Scotland
19:45	Hendry 17'; Vaughan 31', 40'; Gullan 48', 77'	BBC Sport report	O'Hara 22'	Stadium: Stark's Park; Attendance: 0 Referee: Euan Anderson

3 April 2021 Match 23	Dunfermline Athletic	0 – 0	Heart of Midlothian	Dunfermline, Scotland
15:00		BBC Sport Report		Stadium: East End Park; Attendance: 0 Referee: Colin Steven

10 April 2021 Match 24	Ayr United	1 – 1	Dunfermline Athletic	Ayr, Scotland
15:00	Miller 24'	BBC Sport report	McManus 12'	Stadium: Somerset Park; Attendance: 0 Referee: Greg Aitken

13 April 2020 Match 18	Dunfermline Athletic	0 – 0	Dundee	Dunfermline, Scotland
19:00		Report		Stadium: East End Park; Attendance: 0 Referee: Kevin Clancy

17 April 2020 Match 25	Dunfermline Athletic	3 – 1	Queen of the South	Dunfermline, Scotland
12:00	O'Hara 10'; F. Murray 82'; Henderson 90+1'	Report	Maxwell 87'	Stadium: East End Park; Attendance: 0 Referee: David Lowe

24 April 2020 Match 26	Dunfermline Athletic	4 – 3	Arbroath	Dunfermline, Scotland
15:00	McManus 10' (pen.); O'Hara 15'; Wighton 57', 75'	Report	Hamilton 33'; Low 35' (pen.); Stewart 82'	Stadium: East End Park; Attendance: 0 Referee: Steven McLean

30 April 2021 Match 27	Alloa Athletic	1 – 0	Dunfermline Athletic	Alloa, Scotland
19:45	Dick 47'	BBC Sport report		Stadium: Recreation Park; Attendance: 0 Referee: Peter Stuart

=== Premiership play–off ===
4 May 2021 Quarter-Final 1st Leg	Dunfermline Athletic	0 – 0	Raith Rovers	Dunfermline, Scotland
19:00		Report		Stadium: East End Park; Attendance: 0 Referee: Steven Kirkland

8 May 2021 Quarter-Final 2nd Leg	Raith Rovers	2 – 0	Dunfermline Athletic	Kirkcaldy, Scotland
15:00	Vaughan 64'; Ugwu 89'	Report		Stadium: Stark's Park; Attendance: 0 Referee: Greg Aitken

=== Scottish League Cup ===
==== Group stage ====
6 October 2020 Group stage	Dumbarton	0 – 1	Dunfermline Athletic	Dumbarton, Scotland
19:45		Match report	O'Hara 26' (pen.)	Stadium: Dumbarton Football Stadium; Attendance: 0 Referee: Ross

9 October 2020 Group stage	Dunfermline Athletic	2 – 0	Falkirk	Dunfermline, Scotland
19:45	E Murray 58', 65'	Match report		Stadium: East End Park; Attendance: 0 Referee: Grant Irvine

13 October 2020 Group stage	Kilmarnock	0 – 3	Dunfermline Athletic	Kilmarnock, Scotland
19:45		Match report	E Murray 55'; F Murray 72', 83'	Stadium: Rugby Park; Attendance: 0 Referee: Andrew Dallas

14 November 2020 Group stage	Dunfermline Athletic	3 – 2	Clyde	Dunfermline, Scotland
15:00	O'Hara 60' (pen.); McManus 87'; Watson 90+1'	BBC Sport report	Love 35'; Lamont 51'	Stadium: East End Park; Attendance: 0 Referee: David Dickinson

==== Knockout phase ====
28 November 2020 Second Round	Arbroath	1 – 3	Dunfermline Athletic	Arbroath, Scotland
15:00	Hilson 65'	BBC Sport report	Dow 28'; E Murray 36'; O'Hara 82' (pen.)	Stadium: Gayfield Park; Attendance: 0 Referee: Nick Walsh

15 December 2020 Quarter-Final	Dunferemline Athletic	1 – 1 (3 – 4 p)	St Johnstone	Dunfermline, Scotland
15:00	Wilson 113'	BBC Sport report	Rooney 94'	Stadium: East End Park; Attendance: 0 Referee: Don Robertson

=== Scottish Cup ===
23 March 2021 Second Round	Greenock Morton	0 – 0 (6 – 5 p)	Dunfermline Athletic	Greenock
19:45		Report		Stadium: Cappielow; Attendance: 0

== Squad statistics ==
=== Appearances and goals ===
During the 2020–21 season, Dunfermline used twenty-six different players in competitive matches. The table below shows the number of appearances and goals scored by each player. Forward Declan McManus made the most appearances, playing thirty-six out of a possible 36 games. Kevin O'Hara scored the most goals, with eleven in all competitions.

As of 8 May 2021

No.	Pos	Nat	Player	Total		Scottish Championship		League Cup		Scottish Cup		Play-offs	
No.	Pos	Nat	Player	Apps	Goals	Apps	Goals	Apps	Goals	Apps	Goals	Apps	Goals
1	GK	(Wales) WAL	Owain Fôn Williams	33	0	26	0	4	0	1	0	2	0
2	DF	(Scotland) SCO	Aaron Comrie	28	1	19+2	1	3+1	0	1	0	2	0
3	DF	(Scotland) SCO	Josh Edwards	34	0	25	0	6	0	1	0	2	0
4	DF	(Scotland) SCO	Lewis Martin	0	0	0	0	0	0	0	0	0	0
5	DF	(Scotland) SCO	Euan Murray	34	7	25	3	6	4	1	0	2	0
6	DF	(Scotland) SCO	Kyle MacDonald	5	0	4+1	0	0	0	0	0	0	0
7	FW	(Scotland) SCO	Kevin O'Hara	33	11	13+11	8	4+2	3	1	0	2	0
8	MF	(Scotland) SCO	Ewan Henderson	10	1	6+2	1	0+0	0	0	0	2	0
9	FW	(Scotland) SCO	Craig Wighton	13	6	9+1	6	0+0	0	0+1	0	2	0
10	FW	(Scotland) SCO	Declan McManus	36	10	22+5	9	5+1	1	1	0	1+1	0
11	MF	(Scotland) SCO	Ryan Dow	19	3	11+2	2	5+1	1	0	0	0	0
13	DF	(Lithuania) LTU	Vytas Gašpuitis	7	0	5+2	0	0	0	0	0	0	0
14	FW	(Northern Ireland) NIR	Lewis McCann	16	0	3+8	0	0+4	0	1	0	0	0
15	MF	(Scotland) SCO	Iain Wilson	27	1	15+5	0	3+3	1	0+1	0	0	0
16	MF	(Scotland) SCO	Steven Whittaker	24	0	16+2	0	3	0	1	0	2	0
18	MF	(Scotland) SCO	Paul Allan	2	0	1	0	0	0	0+1	0	0	0
19	DF	(Scotland) SCO	Miller Fenton	0	0	0	0	0	0	0	0	0	0
20	GK	(Scotland) SCO	Cammy Gill	3	0	1	0	2	0	0	0	0	0
21	MF	(Scotland) SCO	Fraser Murray	31	6	12+11	4	4+2	2	0+1	0	0+1	0
22	DF	(Scotland) SCO	Lewis Mayo	25	0	16+5	0	1+1	0	1	0	1	0
23	MF	(Scotland) SCO	Dom Thomas	30	1	20+1	1	5+1	0	0+1	0	2	0
24	MF	(Scotland) SCO	Kerr McInroy	22	0	11+5	0	4	0	1	0	0+1	0
25	MF	(Scotland) SCO	Scott Banks	13	0	6+5	0	0	0	0	0	0+2	0
26	MF	(Scotland) SCO	Matty Todd	2	0	0+1	0	0	0	1	0	0	0
27	MF	(Scotland) SCO	Lucas Berry	0	0	0	0	0	0	0	0	0	0
30	GK	(Scotland) SCO	Ben Swinton	0	0	0	0	0	0	0	0	0	0
44	DF	(Scotland) SCO	Paul Watson	28	3	18+2	2	6	1	0	0	2	0
Players away from the club on loan:
8	MF	(Scotland) SCO	Kyle Turner (on loan at Airdrieonians)	19	1	10+3	1	4+2	0	0	0	0	0
9	FW	(England) ENG	Gabby McGill (on loan at York City)	2	0	0+1	0	0	0	0+1	0	0	0
12	MF	(Scotland) SCO	Scott Cusick (on loan at Brechin City)	0	0	0	0	0	0	0	0	0	0
Players who left during the season:
6	DF	(Scotland) SCO	Tom Lang	0	0	0	0	0	0	0	0	0	0
17	DF	(England) ENG	Matthew Bowman	1	0	0	0	1	0	0	0	0	0
25	DF	(Scotland) SCO	Thomas Bragg	0	0	0	0	0	0	0	0	0	0

=== Goalscorers ===
During the 2020–21 season, twelve Dunfermline players scored 51 goals in all competitions.

As of match played 8 May 2021

Ranking	Position	Nation	Name	Total	Scottish Championship	Scottish League Cup	Scottish Cup	Scottish Premiership play-offs
1	FW	(Scotland)	Kevin O'Hara	11	8	3		
2	FW	(Scotland)	Declan McManus	10	9	1		
3	DF	(Scotland)	Euan Murray	7	3	4		
4	FW	(Scotland)	Craig Wighton	6	6			
4	MF	(Scotland)	Fraser Murray	6	4	2		
6	MF	(Scotland)	Ryan Dow	3	2	1		
6	DF	(Scotland)	Paul Watson	3	2	1		
8	DF	(Scotland)	Aaron Comrie	1	1			
8	MF	(Scotland)	Ewan Henderson	1	1			
8	MF	(Scotland)	Dom Thomas	1	1			
8	MF	(Scotland)	Kyle Turner	1	1			
8	MF	(Scotland)	Iain Wilson	1		1		
Total				51	38	13	0	0

=== Disciplinary record ===
As of match played 8 May 2021

Squad number	Position	Nation	Name	Total		Scottish Championship		Scottish Cup		Scottish League Cup		Scottish Premiership play-offs	
Squad number	Position	Nation	Name	Booked	Sent off (straight red)	Booked	Sent off (straight red)	Booked	Sent off (straight red)	Booked	Sent off (straight red)	Booked	Sent off (straight red)
22	DF	(Scotland)	Lewis Mayo	3	1	2	1			1			
16	DF	(Scotland)	Steven Whittaker	7		6						1	
10	FW	(Scotland)	Declan McManus	7		5				2			
15	MF	(Scotland)	Iain Wilson	6		6							
44	DF	(Scotland)	Paul Watson	6		5				1			
3	DF	(Scotland)	Josh Edwards	3		3							
8	MF	(Scotland)	Ewan Henderson	3		2						1	
1	GK	(Wales)	Owain Fôn Williams	2		2							
11	MF	(Scotland)	Ryan Dow	2		2							
24	MF	(Scotland)	Kerr McInroy	2		2							
2	DF	(Scotland)	Aaron Comrie	1		1							
5	DF	(Scotland)	Euan Murray	1		1							
6	DF	(Scotland)	Kyle MacDonald	1		1							
8	MF	(Scotland)	Kyle Turner	1		1							
9	FW	(Scotland)	Craig Wighton	1		1							
14	FW	(Northern Ireland)	Lewis McCann	1		1							
21	MF	(Scotland)	Fraser Murray	1						1			
Total				48	1	41	1	0	0	5	0	2	0

== Club statistics ==
=== League table ===
Pos	Team	Pld	W	D	L	GF	GA	GD	Pts	Promotion, qualification or relegation
2	Dundee (O, P)	27	12	9	6	49	40	+9	45	Qualification for the Premiership play-off semi-final
3	Raith Rovers	27	12	7	8	45	36	+9	43	Qualification for the Premiership play-off quarter-final
4	Dunfermline Athletic	27	10	9	8	38	34	+4	39	Qualification for the Premiership play-off quarter-final
5	Inverness Caledonian Thistle	27	8	12	7	36	31	+5	36	
6	Queen of the South	27	9	5	13	38	51	−13	32	

Source: SPFL
Rules for classification: 1) Points; 2) Goal difference; 3) Goals scored; 4) Head-to-to head points; 5) Head-to-head goal difference; 6) Play-off (only for deciding promotion, play-off participation and relegation).
(O) Play-off winners; (P) Promoted

==== Results by round ====
Round	1	2	3	4	5	6	7	8	9	10	11	12	13	14	15	16	17	18	19	20	21	22	23	24	25	26	27
Ground	H	A	H	A	H	A	H	A	H	A	A	H	A	H	A	H	A	H	A	A	A	H	A	H	H	H	A
Result	W	W	W	D	W	D	L	D	W	D	D	D	L	W	L	W	L	W	L	L	L	D	D	D	W	W	L
Position	3	2	1	3	1	2	2	2	2	2	2	2	3	2	3	2	3	2	3	4	5	4	5	5	4	4	4

Updated to match(es) played on 30 April 2021. Source: dafc.co.uk
A = Away; H = Home; W = Win; D = Draw; L = Loss

==== Results summary ====
Overall								Home						Away					
Pld	W	D	L	GF	GA	GD	Pts	W	D	L	GF	GA	GD	W	D	L	GF	GA	GD
27	10	9	8	38	34	+4	39	9	3	1	24	12	+12	1	6	7	14	22	−8

Last updated: 27 February 2021.
Source: dafc.co.uk

=== League cup table ===
Pos	Team	Pld	W	PW	PL	L	GF	GA	GD	Pts	Qualification	DNF	FAL	KIL	CLY	DUM
1	Dunfermline Athletic	4	4	0	0	0	9	2	+7	12	Qualification for the Second round	—	2–0	—	3–2	—
2	Falkirk	4	3	0	0	1	9	3	+6	9	Qualification for the Second round	—	—	3–0	2–1	—
3	Kilmarnock	4	2	0	0	2	4	6	−2	6		0–3	—	—	—	2–0
4	Clyde	4	1	0	0	3	6	9	−3	3		—	—	0–2	—	3–2
5	Dumbarton	4	0	0	0	4	2	10	−8	0		0–1	0–4	—	—	—

Rules for classification: 1) points, 2) goal difference, 3) goals scored, 4) away goals scored, 5) matches won, 6) away matches won, 7) drawing of lots.

== Awards ==
=== End of Season ===
==== Club ====
Award	Player	Ref.
Player's Player of the Year	(Scotland) Euan Murray	
Joe Nelson Young Player of the Year	(Scotland) Josh Edwards	
Centenary Club Lifeline Player of the Year	(Scotland) Aaron Comrie	
The Manager & Coaching Staff Player of the Year	(Scotland) Paul Watson	
The Manager & Coaching Staff Young Player of the Year	(Scotland) Josh Edwards	
The DAFC Goal of the Season	(Scotland) Craig Wighton vs. Dundee	

== Transfers ==
=== First team ===
==== Players in ====
Date	Position	No.	Nationality	Name	From	Fee	Ref.
29 June 2020	DF	44	(Scotland)	Paul Watson	Dundee United	Free	
29 June 2020	DF	16	(Scotland)	Steven Whittaker	Hibernian	Free	
10 July 2020	FW	10	(Scotland)	Declan McManus	Ross County	Free	
10 July 2020	FW	7	(Scotland)	Kevin O'Hara	Alloa Athletic	Compensation	
10 July 2020	MF	23	(Scotland)	Dom Thomas	Kilmarnock	Compensation	
16 July 2020	MF	15	(Scotland)	Iain Wilson	Kilmarnock	Free	
3 August 2020	GK	1	(Wales)	Owain Fôn Williams	Hamilton Academical	Free	
9 September 2020	MF	12	(Scotland)	Scott Cusick	(re-signed)	Free	
14 January 2021	DF	6	(Scotland)	Kyle MacDonald	Airdrieonians	Undisclosed	
4 February 2021	DF	13	(Lithuania)	Vytas Gašpuitis	(Lithuania) FK Panevėžys	Free	

==== Players out ====
Date	Position	No.	Nationality	Name	To	Fee	Ref.
31 May 2020	GK	1	(Republic of Ireland)	Ryan Scully	Hamilton Academical	Free	
31 May 2020	DF	6	(Scotland)	Lee Ashcroft	Dundee	Free	
31 May 2020	MF	7	(Scotland)	Joe Thomson	(Republic of Ireland) Derry City	Free	
31 May 2020	MF	8	(Australia)	Tom Beadling	(England) Barrow	Free	
31 May 2020	DF	14	(Republic of Ireland)	Danny Devine	Inverness CT	Free	
31 May 2020	DF	16	(Scotland)	Stuart Morrison	Queen's Park	Free	
31 May 2020	FW	17	(Scotland)	Callum Smith	Hamilton Academical	Free	
31 May 2020	MF	21	(Northern Ireland)	Paul Paton	East Kilbride	Free	
31 May 2020	FW	—	(Scotland)	Andy Ryan	Stirling Albion	Free	
10 July 2020	FW	15	(Scotland)	Kevin Nisbet	Hibernian	Undisclosed	
2 October 2020	DF	6	(Scotland)	Tom Lang	Clyde	Undisclosed	
27 October 2020	DF	25	(England)	Thomas Bragg	(England) Eastleigh	Free	
2 February 2021	DF	17	(England)	Matthew Bowman	Free	Released	

==== Loans in ====
Date	Position	No.	Nationality	Name	From	Duration	Ref.
22 September 2020	MF	24	(Scotland)	Kerr McInroy	Celtic	End of season	
25 September 2020	DF	22	(Scotland)	Lewis Mayo	Rangers	End of season	
25 September 2020	MF	21	(Scotland)	Fraser Murray	Hibernian	End of season	
25 January 2021	MF	25	(Scotland)	Scott Banks	(England) Crystal Palace	End of season	
12 February 2021	FW	9	(Scotland)	Craig Wighton	Heart of Midlothian	End of season	
26 March 2021	MF	8	(Scotland)	Ewan Henderson	Celtic	End of season	

==== Loans out ====
Date	Position	No.	Nationality	Name	To	Duration	Ref.
9 September 2020	MF	38	(Scotland)	Scott Cusick	Brechin City	End of season	
25 September 2020	MF	26	(Scotland)	Matty Todd	Brechin City	End of season	
15 October 2020	FW	9	(England)	Gabby McGill	Edinburgh City	Three months	
21 October 2020	MF	18	(Scotland)	Paul Allan	Albion Rovers	End of season	
18 January 2021	FW	9	(England)	Gabby McGill	(England) York City	End of season	
16 March 2021	MF	8	(Scotland)	Kyle Turner	Airdrieonians	End of season	

=== Reserve team ===
==== Players out ====
Date	Position	No.	Nationality	Name	To	Duration	Ref.
31 May 2020	DF	25	(Scotland)	Gregor Jordan	Brechin City	Free	
31 May 2020	DF	28	(Scotland)	Josh Robertson	Free	Released	
31 May 2020	FW	29	(Scotland)	Lewis Crosbie	Free	Released	
31 May 2020	GK	30	(Scotland)	Craig Burt	Free	Released	
31 May 2020	MF	32	(Scotland)	Lewis Sawers	Free	Released	
31 May 2020	MF	33	(Scotland)	Paul Brown	Stenhousemuir	Free	
31 May 2020	MF	36	(Scotland)	Cameron Graham	Stenhousemuir	Free	
31 May 2020	MF	38	(Scotland)	Scott Cusick	Dunfermline Athletic	Re-signed	

== Contract extensions ==
Date	Position	Nationality	Name	Length	Expiry	Ref.
22 December 2020	MF	(Scotland)	Ryan Dow	1 year	2022	
5 January 2021	DF	(Scotland)	Aaron Comrie	2 years	2023	
