= 2022–23 FC Lausanne-Sport season =

FC Lausanne-Sport
2022–23 season
- Chairman: David Thompson
- Manager: Ludovic Magnin
- Stadium: Stade de la Tuilière
- Swiss Challenge League: 2nd
- Swiss Cup: Round 2

The 2022–23 season is the 127th season in the history of FC Lausanne-Sport and their first season back in the second division since 2021. The club are participating in Swiss Challenge League and the Swiss Cup. The season covers the period from 1 July 2022 to 30 June 2023.

== Players ==
As of 8 July 2022

Note: Flags indicate national team as defined under FIFA eligibility rules; some limited exceptions apply. Players may hold more than one non-FIFA nationality.

No.	Pos.	Nation	Player
1	GK	SUI	Thomas Castella
2	DF	SUI	Simone Grippo
3	DF	ENG	Archie Brown
5	DF	GER	Berkay Dabanli
7	MF	SUI	Stjepan Kukuruzović (captain)
10	MF	SUI	Olivier Custodio
13	MF	SUI	Nassim Zoukit
16	MF	SUI	Mayka Okuka
17	MF	FRA	Goduine Koyalipou
18	MF	SUI	Stéphane Cueni
22	GK	SUI	Raphael Spiegel
28	MF	JPN	Toichi Suzuki
33	MF	SUI	Marvin Spielmann

No.	Pos.	Nation	Player
34	DF	SUI	Raoul Giger
37	DF	FRA	Mickaël Nanizayamo
51	DF	SUI	Anel Husic
55	MF	GER	Gianluca Gaudino
71	DF	SUI	Karim Sow
72	DF	SUI	Tristan Fernandez
77	MF	SUI	Dominik Schwizer
78	MF	KOS	Florian Hysenaj
80	MF	FRA	Alvyn Sanches
91	GK	FRA	Melvin Mastil
96	FW	MTQ	Brighton Labeau
98	FW	ENG	Trae Coyle
99	FW	BIH	Aldin Turkeš

=== Out on loan ===
Note: Flags indicate national team as defined under FIFA eligibility rules; some limited exceptions apply. Players may hold more than one non-FIFA nationality.

No. / Pos. / Nation / Player; — / MF / FRA / Maxen Kapo (on loan to Étoile Carouge)	No. / Pos. / Nation / Player; — / FW / SUI / Zeki Amdouni (on loan to Basel)

== Pre-season and friendlies ==
Win Draw Loss Fixtures

6 July 2022 Friendly	Lausanne-Sport (Switzerland)	2–1	(Switzerland) Bulle	Lausanne
19:30 CEST (UTC+2)				Stadium: Stade de la Tuilière

9 July 2022 Friendly	Thun (Switzerland)	0–1	(Switzerland) Lausanne-Sport	Gstaad
16:30 CEST (UTC+2)			Custodio 89'	Stadium: Sportplatz Schützebode

3 December 2022 Friendly	Lausanne-Sport (Switzerland)	0–1	(Switzerland) Basel	Lausanne
14:30 CET (UTC+1)			Amdouni 18'	Stadium: Stade de la Tuilière

14 January 2023 Friendly	Lausanne-Sport (Switzerland)	3–0	(Algeria) MC Alger	Tunis, Tunisia
16:00 CET (UTC+1)	Turkeš 47' (pen.); 50' (o.g.); Spielmann 61'	Report		Stadium: Centre d’entraînement du Club Africain de Tunis; Attendance: 0

== Competitions ==
=== Overall record ===
Competition	First match	Last match	Starting round	Final position	Record							
Competition	First match	Last match	Starting round	Final position	Pld	W	D	L	GF	GA	GD	Win %
Swiss Challenge League	16 July 2022	27 May 2023	Matchday 1		35	17	9	9	56	41	+15	48.57
Swiss Cup	21 August 2022	9 November 2022	Round 1	Last 16	3	2	0	1	8	7	+1	66.67
Total					38	19	9	10	64	48	+16	50.00

Last updated: 23 May 2023
Source: Soccerway

=== Swiss Challenge League ===
==== League table ====
Pos	Team	Pld	W	D	L	GF	GA	GD	Pts	Promotion or qualification
1	Yverdon (C, P)	36	20	6	10	64	53	+11	66	Promotion to Swiss Super League
2	Lausanne (P)	36	17	10	9	58	43	+15	61	Promotion to Swiss Super League
3	Lausanne-Ouchy (Note: Lausanne-Ouchy were deducted 3 points on 1 November 2022, due to license violations. This decision was overturned following the team's appeal on 22 November 2022.) (O, P)	36	17	9	10	70	53	+17	60	Qualification for the promotion play-off
4	Aarau	36	15	12	9	63	57	+6	57	
5	Wil	36	16	8	12	62	52	+10	56	

Source: Swiss Challenge League
Rules for classification: 1) Points; 2) Goal difference; 3) Goals scored; 4) Head-to-head goal difference; 5) Away goals scored; 6) Draw.
(C) Champions; (O) Play-off winners; (P) Promoted

==== Results summary ====
Overall								Home						Away					
Pld	W	D	L	GF	GA	GD	Pts	W	D	L	GF	GA	GD	W	D	L	GF	GA	GD
5	3	1	1	8	3	+5	10	1	1	0	5	1	+4	2	0	1	3	2	+1

Last updated: 12 August 2022.
Source: Swiss Challenge League

==== Results by round ====
Round	1	2	3	4	5	6
Ground	A	H	A	H	A	H
Result	L	W	W	D	W	
Position						

Updated to match(es) played on 12 August 2022. Source: Swiss Challenge League
A = Away; H = Home; W = Win; D = Draw; L = Loss

==== Matches ====
The league fixtures were announced on 17 June 2022.

=== Swiss Cup ===
21 August 2022 Round 1	Gland	0–4	Lausanne-Sport	Gland
15:00 CEST (UTC+2)		Report		Stadium: Centre sportif En Bord

18 September 2022 Round 2	FC Lausanne-Sport (ChL)	3–2 (a.e.t.)	FC Zürich (SL)	Lausanne
16:00 CEST (UTC+1)	Labeau 24'; Turkes 90+5', 114'	Report	9' (o.g.) Husic; 36' Marchesano; (yellow card) 105' (yellow-red card) 117' Okita	Stadium: Stade de la Tuilière

9 November 2022 Round 3	FC Lausanne-Sport (ChL)	1–5	BSC Young Boys (SL)	Lausanne
20:15 CET (UTC+1)		Report		Stadium: Stade de la Tuilière
