= 2016 Super 8s =

- League: Rugby League Super 8s
- Duration: 7 Rounds (Followed by 2 rounds of relevant playoffs)
- Teams: 39
- Broadcast partners: (United Kingdom) Sky Sports (United Kingdom) BBC Sport (United Kingdom) SLTV; Fox Sports (Australia) (France) beIN Sport (United States) Fox Soccer Plus (Europe) Sport Klub

2016 season
- Super League; Wigan Warriors; Qualifiers; Leeds Rhinos; Championship Shield; Bradford Bulls; League 1 Rochdale Hornets; League 1 Shield; Newcastle Thunder
- Biggest home win: Bradford Bulls 83 – 0 Oldham
- Biggest away win: Hemel Stags 10 – 66 Newcastle Thunder
- Man of Steel Awards: Danny Houghton (Hull F.C.)
- Top try-scorer: Denny Solomona (Castleford Tigers) (40)

Promotion and relegation
- Promoted from Championship League 1: Leigh Centurions; Rochdale Hornets
- Relegated to Championship League 1: Hull Kingston Rovers; Workington Town; Whitehaven

The 2016 Super 8s were a feature of the British rugby league system, between 2015 and 2018, and were played in the top three professional divisions.

After 23 games the league table is frozen and the teams are split into 5 groups called the Super 8s. The top 8 Super League play each other once more before the top 4 team enter the playoffs for a place in the Super League Grand Final.

The bottom 4 Super League teams and top 4 Championship teams play each other in The Qualifiers for a place in next seasons Super League. The bottom 4 Championship teams play each other once more with the top 4 teams entering the playoffs for the Championship Shield with the bottom 2 teams being relegated to League 1.

The top 8 League 1 sides play each other once more before the top 5 teams enter the playoffs with 2 teams being promoted. The bottom 7 teams play each other for the League 1 Shield

== Super League ==
The Super League Super 8s sees the top 8 teams from the Super League play 7 games each. Each team's points are carried over and after 7 additional games the top 4 teams will contest the play off semi-finals with the team in 1st hosting the team in 4th, and the team finishing 2nd hosting the 3rd placed team; the winners of these semi-finals will contest the Super League Grand Final at Old Trafford.

=== Round 1 ===
| Home | Score | Away | Match Information |
| Home | Score | Away | Venue | Referee | Attendance |
|---|---|---|---|---|---|
| Warrington Wolves | 18–20 | St. Helens | Halliwell Jones Stadium | Bentham | 10,881 |
| Hull F.C. | 16–30 | Castleford Tigers | KCOM Stadium | Smith | 9,936 |
| Wigan Warriors | 60–12 | Wakefield Trinity | DW Stadium | Mikalauskas | 10,593 |
| Catalans Dragons | 26-10 | Widnes Vikings | Stade Gilbert Brutus | Hicks | 7,341 |

=== Round 2 ===
| Home | Score | Away | Match Information |
| Home | Score | Away | Venue | Referee | Attendance |
|---|---|---|---|---|---|
| Widnes Vikings | 0–38 | Hull F.C. | Halton Stadium | Thaler | 4,359 |
| Castleford Tigers | 36-22 | Wigan Warriors | Wheldon Road | Cobb | 6,325 |
| St. Helens | 39-16 | Catalans Dragons | Langtree Park | Child | 9,440 |
| Wakefield Trinity | 10-38 | Warrington Wolves | Belle Vue | Hicks | 3,552 |

=== Round 3 ===
| Home | Score | Away | Match Information |
| Home | Score | Away | Venue | Referee | Attendance |
|---|---|---|---|---|---|
| Hull F.C. | 44-0 | Catalans Dragons | KCOM Stadium | Bentham | 10,494 |
| Wigan Warriors | 25-0 | St. Helens | DW Stadium | Thaler | 15,265 |
| Warrington Wolves | 14-11 | Castleford Tigers | Halliwell Jones Stadium | Kendall | 9,228 |
| Widnes Vikings | 40–8 | Wakefield Trinity | Halton Stadium | | 4,010 |

=== Round 4 ===
| Home | Score | Away | Match Information |
| Home | Score | Away | Venue | Referee | Attendance |
|---|---|---|---|---|---|
| Wigan Warriors | 6-8 | Widnes Vikings | DW Stadium | Bentham | 11,495 |
| St. Helens | 31-10 | Hull F.C. | Langtree Park | Campbell | 10,086 |
| Catalans Dragons | 22-26 | Warrington Wolves | Stade Gilbert Brutus | Smith | 7,108 |
| Castleford Tigers | 46-22 | Wakefield Trinity | Wheldon Road | Hewer | 6,298 |

=== Round 5 ===
| Home | Score | Away | Match Information |
| Home | Score | Away | Venue | Referee | Attendance |
|---|---|---|---|---|---|
| St. Helens | 40–16 | Castleford Tigers | Langtree Park | Smith | 9,448 |
| Warrington Wolves | 30–12 | Widnes Vikings | Halliwell Jones Stadium | Hewer | 10,488 |
| Hull F.C. | 12–18 | Wigan Warriors | KCOM Stadium | Thaler | 11,686 |
| Wakefield Trinity | 10–14 | Catalans Dragons | Belle Vue | Child | 2,612 |

=== Round 6 ===
| Home | Score | Away | Match Information |
| Home | Score | Away | Venue | Referee | Attendance |
|---|---|---|---|---|---|
| Widnes Vikings | 8–21 | St. Helens | Halton Stadium | Child | 6,128 |
| Warrington Wolves | 28–35 | Wigan Warriors | Halliwell Jones Stadium | Hicks | 13,044 |
| Catalans Dragons | 28–34 | Castleford Tigers | Stade Gilbert Brutus | Bentham | 7,802 |
| Wakefield Trinity | 12–18 | Hull F.C. | Belle Vue | Campbell | 3,413 |

=== Round 7 ===
| Home | Score | Away | Match Information |
| Home | Score | Away | Venue | Referee | Attendance |
|---|---|---|---|---|---|
| St. Helens | 32–12 | Wakefield Trinity | Langtree Park | Cobb | 9,516 |
| Hull F.C. | 6–23 | Warrington Wolves | KCOM Stadium | Thaler | 17,453 |
| Wigan Warriors | 48–24 | Catalans Dragons | DW Stadium | Bentham | 16,140 |
| Castleford Tigers | 40–26 | Widnes Vikings | Wheldon Road | Smith | 7,103 |

=== Standings ===
| Pos | Team | Pld | W | D | L | PF | PA | PD | Pts | Qualification |
|---|---|---|---|---|---|---|---|---|---|---|
| 1 | Warrington Wolves (L) | 30 | 21 | 1 | 8 | 852 | 541 | +311 | 43 | Semi-finals |
| 2 | Wigan Warriors (C) | 30 | 21 | 0 | 9 | 669 | 560 | +109 | 42 | Semi-finals |
| 3 | Hull F.C. | 30 | 20 | 0 | 10 | 749 | 579 | +170 | 40 | Semi-finals |
| 4 | St Helens | 30 | 20 | 0 | 10 | 756 | 641 | +115 | 40 | Semi-finals |
| 5 | Castleford Tigers | 30 | 15 | 1 | 14 | 830 | 808 | +22 | 31 | |
| 6 | Catalans Dragons | 30 | 15 | 0 | 15 | 723 | 716 | +7 | 30 | |
| 7 | Widnes Vikings | 30 | 12 | 0 | 18 | 603 | 643 | −40 | 24 | |
| 8 | Wakefield Trinity | 30 | 10 | 0 | 20 | 571 | 902 | −331 | 20 | |

Source: BBC Sport
(C) Champions; (L) League Leaders' Shield Winners

=== Play-offs ===
| # | Home | Score | Away | Match Information |
| # | Home | Score | Away | Date and Time (Local) | Venue | Referee | Attendance |
|---|---|---|---|---|---|---|---|
SEMI-FINALS
| SF1 | Warrington Wolves | 18–10 | St. Helens | 29 September 20:00 | Halliwell Jones Stadium | Thaler | 12,036 |
| SF2 | Wigan Warriors | 28-18 | Hull F.C. | 30 September 20:00 | DW Stadium | Hicks | 10,013 |
GRAND FINAL
| F | Warrington Wolves | 6–12 | Wigan Warriors | 8 October 18:00 | Old Trafford, Manchester | Hicks | 70,202 |

== The Qualifiers ==
The Qualifiers Super 8s sees the bottom 4 teams from Super League table join the top 4 teams from the Championship. The points totals are reset to 0 and each team plays 7 games each, playing every other team once. After 7 games each the teams finishing 1st, 2nd, and 3rd will gain qualification to the 2017 Super League season. The teams finishing 4th and 5th will play in the "Million Pound Game" at the home of the 4th place team which will earn the winner a place in the 2017 Super League; the loser, along with teams finishing 6th, 7th and 8th, will be relegated to the Championship.

=== Round 1 ===
| Home | Score | Away | Match Information |
| Home | Score | Away | Venue | Attendance |
|---|---|---|---|---|
| Featherstone Rovers | 6–62 | Leeds Rhinos | Post Office Road | 6,671 |
| Leigh Centurions | 34-30 | London Broncos | Leigh Sports Village | 4,041 |
| Salford Red Devils | 34–12 | Huddersfield Giants | Salford City Stadium | 2,184 |
| Hull Kingston Rovers | 58–18 | Batley Bulldogs | Craven Park | 5,491 |

=== Round 2 ===
| Home | Score | Away | Match Information |
| Home | Score | Away | Venue | Attendance |
|---|---|---|---|---|
| Leeds Rhinos | 22–18 | Hull Kingston Rovers | Headingley Stadium | 14,180 |
| Leigh Centurions | 32–26 | Salford Red Devils | Leigh Sports Village | 4,547 |
| Huddersfield Giants | 62-16 | Featherstone Rovers | Kirklees Stadium | 3,690 |
| London Broncos | 76-16 | Batley Bulldogs | Trailfinders Sports Ground | 594 |

=== Round 3 ===
| Home | Score | Away | Match Information |
| Home | Score | Away | Venue | Attendance |
|---|---|---|---|---|
| Salford Red Devils | 12–29 | Hull Kingston Rovers | Salford City Stadium | 2,074 |
| Featherstone Rovers | 18–30 | Leigh Centurions | Post Office Road | 1,678 |
| London Broncos | 28–42 | Leeds Rhinos | Trailfinders Sports Ground | 3,015 |
| Batley Bulldogs | 28–58 | Huddersfield Giants | Mount Pleasant | 1,390 |

=== Round 4 ===
| Home | Score | Away | Match Information |
| Home | Score | Away | Venue | Attendance |
|---|---|---|---|---|
| Leeds Rhinos | 30-8 | Salford Red Devils | Headingley Stadium | 13,996 |
| Hull Kingston Rovers | 18–25 | Leigh Centurions | Craven Park | 7,363 |
| Batley Bulldogs | 11–10 | Featherstone Rovers | Mount Pleasant | 1,131 |
| Huddersfield Giants | 40-4 | London Broncos | Kirklees Stadium | 3,794 |

=== Round 5 ===
| Home | Score | Away | Match Information |
| Home | Score | Away | Venue | Attendance |
|---|---|---|---|---|
| Leeds Rhinos | 32–0 | Batley Bulldogs | Headingley Stadium | 15,135 |
| Leigh Centurions | 48–40 | Huddersfield Giants | Leigh Sports Village | 5,934 |
| Salford Red Devils | 70-16 | Featherstone Rovers | Salford City Stadium | 1,579 |
| London Broncos | 18-58 | Hull Kingston Rovers | Trailfinders Sports Ground | 1,215 |

=== Round 6 ===
| Home | Score | Away | Match Information |
| Home | Score | Away | Venue | Attendance |
|---|---|---|---|---|
| Leigh Centurions | 42-24 | Batley Bulldogs | Leigh Sports Village | 10,556 |
| Salford Red Devils | 16-19 | London Broncos | Salford City Stadium | 2,521 |
| Featherstone Rovers | 24–32 | Hull Kingston Rovers | Post Office Road | 4,034 |
| Huddersfield Giants | 22–14 | Leeds Rhinos | Kirklees Stadium | 6,666 |

=== Round 7 ===
| Home | Score | Away | Match Information |
| Home | Score | Away | Venue | Attendance |
|---|---|---|---|---|
| Leeds Rhinos | 37–12 | Leigh Centurions | Headingley Stadium | 14,747 |
| Batley Bulldogs | 14–42 | Salford Red Devils | Mount Pleasant | 1,520 |
| London Broncos | 46–6 | Featherstone Rovers | Trailfinders Sports Ground | 605 |
| Hull Kingston Rovers | 22–23 | Huddersfield Giants | KC Lightstream Stadium | 8,024 |

=== Standings ===
| Pos | Team | Pld | W | D | L | PF | PA | PD | Pts | Qualification |
|---|---|---|---|---|---|---|---|---|---|---|
| 1 | Leeds Rhinos | 7 | 6 | 0 | 1 | 239 | 94 | +145 | 12 | 2017 Super League |
| 2 | Leigh Centurions (P) | 7 | 6 | 0 | 1 | 223 | 193 | +30 | 12 | 2017 Super League |
| 3 | Huddersfield Giants | 7 | 5 | 0 | 2 | 257 | 166 | +91 | 10 | 2017 Super League |
| 4 | Hull Kingston Rovers (R) | 7 | 4 | 0 | 3 | 235 | 142 | +93 | 8 | Million Pound Game |
| 5 | Salford Red Devils | 7 | 3 | 0 | 4 | 208 | 152 | +56 | 6 | Million Pound Game |
| 6 | London Broncos | 7 | 3 | 0 | 4 | 221 | 212 | +9 | 6 | 2017 Championship |
| 7 | Batley Bulldogs | 7 | 1 | 0 | 6 | 111 | 318 | −207 | 2 | 2017 Championship |
| 8 | Featherstone Rovers | 7 | 0 | 0 | 7 | 96 | 313 | −217 | 0 | 2017 Championship |

Source: Rugby League Project
Rules for classification: 1) Points; 2) Points difference; 3) Number of points scored;
(P) Promoted; (R) Relegated

=== Million Pound Game ===
| Home | Score | Away | Match Information |
| Home | Score | Away | Date and Time (local) | Venue | Attendance |
|---|---|---|---|---|---|
Million Pound Game
| Hull Kingston Rovers | 18-19 AET | Salford Red Devils | 1 October 15:00 | KC Lightstream Stadium | 6,562 |

== Championship Shield ==
At the end of the regular season the bottom 8 Championship teams play each other once more, home or away. The bottom two teams are then relegated to League 1 and the top four teams qualify for the play off for the Championship Shield.

=== Round 1 ===
| Home | Score | Away | Match Information |
| Home | Score | Away | Venue | Attendance |
|---|---|---|---|---|
| Whitehaven | 18–46 | Bradford Bulls | Recreation Ground | 675 |
| Dewsbury Rams | 36–24 | Swinton Lions | Crown Flatt | 647 |
| Halifax | 28–48 | Sheffield Eagles | The Shay | 1,228 |
| Oldham R.L.F.C. | 30–16 | Workington Town | Bower Fold | 573 |

=== Round 2 ===
| Home | Score | Away | Match Information |
| Home | Score | Away | Venue | Attendance |
|---|---|---|---|---|
| Bradford Bulls | 44–22 | Halifax | Odsal Stadium | 3,498 |
| Sheffield Eagles | 48–16 | Whitehaven | Bawtry Road | 412 |
| Swinton Lions | 8–30 | Oldham R.L.F.C. | Heywood Road | 693 |
| Workington Town | 34–24 | Dewsbury Rams | Derwent Park | 527 |

=== Round 3 ===
| Home | Score | Away | Match Information |
| Home | Score | Away | Venue | Attendance |
|---|---|---|---|---|
| Bradford Bulls | 83–0 | Oldham R.L.F.C. | Odsal Stadium | 3,022 |
| Halifax | 22–24 | Dewsbury Rams | The Shay | 1,133 |
| Sheffield Eagles | 38–40 | Swinton Lions | Bawtry Road | 466 |
| Workington Town | 24–28 | Whitehaven | Derwent Park | 1,058 |

=== Round 4 ===
| Home | Score | Away | Match Information |
| Home | Score | Away | Venue | Attendance |
|---|---|---|---|---|
| Whitehaven | 10–30 | Halifax | Recreation Ground | 718 |
| Dewsbury Rams | 26–36 | Bradford Bulls | Crown Flatt | 1,807 |
| Oldham R.L.F.C. | 24–54 | Sheffield Eagles | Bower Fold | 680 |
| Swinton Lions | 19–12 | Workington Town | Heywood Road | 546 |

=== Round 5 ===
| Home | Score | Away | Match Information |
| Home | Score | Away | Venue | Attendance |
|---|---|---|---|---|
| Bradford Bulls | 46–28 | Swinton Lions | Odsal Stadium | 4,030 |
| Dewsbury Rams | 12–56 | Whitehaven | Crown Flatt | 524 |
| Halifax | 32–18 | Oldham R.L.F.C. | The Shay | 1,182 |
| Sheffield Eagles | 62–0 | Workington Town | Bawtry Road | 380 |

=== Round 6 ===
| Home | Score | Away | Match Information |
| Home | Score | Away | Venue | Attendance |
|---|---|---|---|---|
| Oldham R.L.F.C. | 18-20 | Whitehaven | Bower Fold | 843 |
| Sheffield Eagles | 22-38 | Dewsbury Rams | Bawtry Road | 564 |
| Swinton Lions | 28-26 | Halifax | Heywood Road | 582 |
| Workington Town | 30-26 | Bradford Bulls | Derwent Park | 596 |

=== Round 7 ===
| Home | Score | Away | Match Information |
| Home | Score | Away | Venue | Attendance |
|---|---|---|---|---|
| Whitehaven | 40-18 | Swinton Lions | Recreation Ground | 733 |
| Bradford Bulls | 80-0 | Sheffield Eagles | Odsal Stadium | 4,035 |
| Dewsbury Rams | 30-12 | Oldham R.L.F.C. | Crown Flatt | 628 |
| Halifax | 46-26 | Workington Town | The Shay | 1,217 |

=== Standings ===
| Pos | Club | P | W | D | L | For | Agst | Diff | Points | Qualification |
|---|---|---|---|---|---|---|---|---|---|---|
| 1 | Bradford Bulls (Q) | 30 | 19 | 2 | 9 | 997 | 570 | 507 | 40 | PlayOffs |
| 2 | Halifax (Q) | 30 | 16 | 1 | 13 | 775 | 656 | 139 | 33 | PlayOffs |
| 3 | Sheffield Eagles (Q) | 30 | 12 | 0 | 18 | 855 | 763 | 12 | 24 | PlayOffs |
| 4 | Dewsbury Rams (Q) | 30 | 12 | 0 | 18 | 646 | 797 | -133 | 24 | PlayOffs |
| 5 | Swinton Lions (S) | 30 | 10 | 1 | 19 | 596 | 1001 | -427 | 21 | Season Complete |
| 6 | Oldham R.L.F.C. (S) | 30 | 10 | 0 | 20 | 523 | 888 | -383 | 20 | Season Complete |
| 7 | Whitehaven (R) | 30 | 8 | 1 | 21 | 571 | 945 | -365 | 17 | Relegation to 2017 League 1 |
| 8 | Workington Town (R) | 30 | 7 | 1 | 22 | 541 | 919 | -394 | 15 | Relegation to 2017 League 1 |

(Q) = Qualified for Play-offs

(S) = Secured spot in Championship

(R) = Relegated to League 1

=== Play-offs ===
| # | Home | Score | Away | Match Information |
| # | Home | Score | Away | Date and Time (Local) | Venue | Referee | Attendance |
|---|---|---|---|---|---|---|---|
SEMI-FINALS
| SF1 | Halifax | 32-46 | Sheffield Eagles | | The Shay | | 946 |
| SF2 | Bradford Bulls | 36-22 | Dewsbury Rams | | Odsal Stadium | | 2,189 |
CHAMPIONSHIP SHIELD FINAL
| F | Bradford Bulls | 27-16 | Sheffield Eagles | | Odsal Stadium | | 3,518 |

== League 1 Super 8s ==
The top 8 teams in League 1 carry points forward and play each other once more home or away. The top five teams after 7 games will enter the playoffs.

=== Round 1 ===
| Home | Score | Away | Match Information |
| Home | Score | Away | Venue | Attendance |
|---|---|---|---|---|
| Hunslet Hawks | 30 – 26 | London Skolars | South Leeds Stadium | 414 |
| Toulouse Olympique | 40 – 4 | Keighley Cougars | Stade Ernest-Argelès | 1,214 |
| Barrow Raiders | 34–12 | Rochdale Hornets | Craven Park | 913 |
| York City Knights | 28–36 | Doncaster | Bootham Crescent | 540 |

=== Round 2 ===
| Home | Score | Away | Match Information |
| Home | Score | Away | Venue | Attendance |
|---|---|---|---|---|
| Doncaster | 12–40 | Barrow Raiders | Keepmoat Stadium | 622 |
| Keighley Cougars | 8–18 | Hunslet Hawks | Cougar Park | 384 |
| London Skolars | 28–38 | Rochdale Hornets | New River Stadium | 308 |
| Toulouse Olympique | 46–16 | York City Knights | Stade Ernest-Argelès | 1,314 |

=== Round 3 ===
| Home | Score | Away | Match Information |
| Home | Score | Away | Venue | Attendance |
|---|---|---|---|---|
| Hunslet Hawks | 24–36 | Doncaster | South Leeds Stadium | 379 |
| Rochdale Hornets | 18–4 | Keighley Cougars | Spotland | 510 |
| London Skolars | 14–58 | Toulouse Olympique | New River Stadium | 974 |
| York City Knights | 6–20 | Barrow Raiders | Bootham Crescent | 664 |

=== Round 4 ===
| Home | Score | Away | Match Information |
| Home | Score | Away | Venue | Attendance |
|---|---|---|---|---|
| Keighley Cougars | 30–10 | London Skolars | Cougar Park | 297 |
| Barrow Raiders | 44–26 | Hunslet Hawks | Craven Park | 1,003 |
| Doncaster | 18–38 | Toulouse Olympique | Keepmoat Stadium | 573 |
| Rochdale Hornets | 16–36 | York City Knights | Spotland | 413 |

=== Round 5 ===
| Home | Score | Away | Match Information |
| Home | Score | Away | Venue | Attendance |
|---|---|---|---|---|
| Toulouse Olympique | 46–6 | Rochdale Hornets | Stade Ernest-Argelès | 1,772 |
| York City Knights | 12–33 | Hunslet Hawks | Bootham Crescent | 702 |
| London Skolars | 4–54 | Barrow Raiders | New River Stadium |
| Doncaster | 26–24 | Keighley Cougars | Keepmoat Stadium | 609 |

=== Round 6 ===
| Home | Score | Away | Match Information |
| Home | Score | Away | Venue | Attendance |
|---|---|---|---|---|
| Barrow Raiders | 26–18 | Keighley Cougars | Craven Park | 1,173 |
| Rochdale Hornets | 38–22 | Doncaster | Spotland | 393 |
| Hunslet Hawks | 12–16 | Toulouse Olympique | South Leeds Stadium | 541 |
| York City Knights | 30–4 | London Skolars | Bootham Crescent | 448 |

=== Round 7 ===
| Home | Score | Away | Match Information |
| Home | Score | Away | Venue | Attendance |
|---|---|---|---|---|
| Rochdale Hornets | 34–18 | Hunslet Hawks | Spotland | 690 |
| Keighley Cougars | 50–8 | York City Knights | Cougar Park | 658 |
| Toulouse Olympique | 44–22 | Barrow Raiders | Stade Ernest-Argelès | 1,161 |
| Doncaster | 34–30 | London Skolars | Keepmoat Stadium | 587 |

=== Standings ===
| Pos | Club | P | W | D | L | For | Ag | Diff | Pts | Qualification |
|---|---|---|---|---|---|---|---|---|---|---|
| 1 | Toulouse Olympique (PP) | 21 | 20 | 1 | 0 | 990 | 276 | 714 | 41 | Promotion Final |
| 2 | Rochdale Hornets (PP) | 21 | 16 | 1 | 4 | 709 | 440 | 269 | 33 | Promotion Final |
| 3 | Barrow Raiders (Q) | 21 | 15 | 1 | 5 | 769 | 375 | 394 | 31 | Playoffs |
| 4 | Doncaster (Q) | 21 | 14 | 0 | 7 | 683 | 526 | 157 | 28 | Playoffs |
| 5 | York City Knights (Q) | 21 | 12 | 1 | 8 | 618 | 461 | 157 | 25 | Playoffs |
| 6 | Keighley Cougars (F) | 21 | 11 | 0 | 10 | 658 | 514 | 144 | 22 | Season Complete |
| 7 | Hunslet (F) | 21 | 11 | 0 | 10 | 544 | 550 | -6 | 22 | Season Complete |
| 8 | London Skolars (F) | 21 | 8 | 0 | 13 | 470 | 650 | -180 | 16 | Season Complete |

(C) = Champions

(PP) = Qualified for Promotion Playoff

(Q) = Qualified for Play-offs

(F) = Failed to reach Playoffs

=== Play-offs ===
| Home | Score | Away | Match Information |
| Home | Score | Away | Venue | Attendance |
|---|---|---|---|---|
PROMOTION FINAL
| Toulouse Olympique | 22-24 | Rochdale Hornets | Stade Ernest-Argelès |

| # | Home | Score | Away | Match Information |
| # | Home | Score | Away | Venue | Attendance |
|---|---|---|---|---|---|
SEMI-FINALS
| SF1 | Barrow Raiders | 46-6 | Doncaster | Craven Park |
| SF2 | Toulouse Olympique | 62-10 | York City Knights | Stade des Minimes |
LEAGUE 1 PLAYOFF FINAL
| F | Toulouse Olympique | 32-22 | Barrow Raiders | Stade des Minimes |

== League 1 Shield ==
The bottom 7 teams compete in the League 1 Shield where they play each other once more home or away. The top 2 teams compete for the League 1 Shield.

=== Round 1 ===
| Home | Score | Away | Match Information |
| Home | Score | Away | Venue | Attendance |
|---|---|---|---|---|
| North Wales Crusaders | 30–26 | South Wales Scorpions | Hare Lane | 343 |
| Coventry Bears | 48–6 | Oxford | Butts Park Arena | 366 |
| Newcastle Thunder | 50–24 | Gloucestershire All Golds | Kingston Park | 482 |

=== Round 2 ===
| Home | Score | Away | Match Information |
| Home | Score | Away | Venue | Attendance |
|---|---|---|---|---|
| Hemel Stags | 18–42 | North Wales Crusaders | Pennine Way | 147 |
| Gloucestershire All Golds | 16–28 | Oxford | Prince of Wales Stadium | 105 |
| South Wales Scorpions | 26–28 | Newcastle Thunder | Virginia Park | 410 |

=== Round 3 ===
| Home | Score | Away | Match Information |
| Home | Score | Away | Venue | Attendance |
|---|---|---|---|---|
| Coventry Bears | 14–18 | South Wales Scorpions | Butts Park Arena | 497 |
| Newcastle Thunder | 30–14 | North Wales Crusaders | Kingston Park | 408 |
| Oxford | 46–10 | Hemel Stags | Tilsey Park | 103 |

=== Round 4 ===
| Home | Score | Away | Match Information |
| Home | Score | Away | Venue | Attendance |
|---|---|---|---|---|
| Oxford | 18–62 | Newcastle Thunder | Tilsey Park | 121 |
| North Wales Crusaders | 28–30 | Coventry Bears | Racecourse Ground | 297 |
| Gloucestershire All Golds | 74–18 | Hemel Stags | Prince of Wales Stadium | 101 |

=== Round 5 ===
| Home | Score | Away | Match Information |
| Home | Score | Away | Venue | Attendance |
|---|---|---|---|---|
| South Wales Scorpions | 12–20 | Oxford | Virginia Park | 178 |
| Hemel Stags | 10–66 | Newcastle Thunder | Pennine Way | 112 |
| Coventry Bears | 33–20 | Gloucestershire All Golds | Butts Park Arena | 392 |

=== Round 6 ===
| Home | Score | Away | Match Information |
| Home | Score | Away | Venue | Attendance |
|---|---|---|---|---|
| Newcastle Thunder | 46–10 | Coventry Bears | Kingston Park | 456 |
| North Wales Crusaders | 18–4 | Gloucestershire All Golds | Racecourse Ground | 270 |
| South Wales Scorpions | 16–8 | Hemel Stags | Virginia Park | 151 |

=== Round 7 ===
| Home | Score | Away | Match Information |
| Home | Score | Away | Venue | Attendance |
|---|---|---|---|---|
| Oxford | 6–37 | North Wales Crusaders | Tilsey Park | 120 |
| Gloucestershire All Golds | 33–18 | South Wales Scorpions | Prince of Wales Stadium | 80 |
| Hemel Stags | 12–22 | Coventry Bears | Pennine Way | 307 |

=== Standings ===
| Pos | Club | P | W | D | L | For | Ag | Diff | Pts | Qualification |
|---|---|---|---|---|---|---|---|---|---|---|
| 1 | Newcastle Thunder (Q) | 20 | 13 | 1 | 6 | 558 | 426 | 132 | 27 | League 1 Shield Final |
| 2 | North Wales Crusaders (Q) | 20 | 9 | 2 | 9 | 440 | 433 | 36 | 20 | League 1 Shield Final |
| 3 | Coventry Bears (F) | 20 | 8 | 1 | 11 | 383 | 542 | -159 | 17 | |
| 4 | Gloucestershire All Golds (F) | 20 | 5 | 0 | 15 | 411 | 607 | -196 | 10 | |
| 5 | Oxford (F) | 20 | 4 | 0 | 16 | 312 | 732 | -487 | 8 | |
| 6 | South Wales Scorpions (F) | 20 | 2 | 0 | 18 | 254 | 697 | -443 | 4 | |
| 7 | Hemel Stags (W) | 20 | 2 | 0 | 18 | 230 | 828 | -598 | 4 | Wooden Spoon |

(Q) = Qualified for Shield Final

(F) = Unable to qualify for Shield Final

(W) = Wooden Spoon

=== Final ===
| Home | Score | Away | Match Information |
| Home | Score | Away | Venue | Attendance |
|---|---|---|---|---|
League 1 Shield Final
| Newcastle Thunder | 31-26 | North Wales Crusaders | Kingston Park |

== See also ==
- Super League XXI
- 2016 RFL Championship
- League 1 2016 season
