= Eyad Hammoud =

Association football player (born 2001)

Personal information
- Full name: Eyad Omar Hammoud
- Date of birth: 24 July 2001 (age 25)
- Place of birth: Majdal Anjar, Lebanon
- Height: 1.65 m (5 ft 5 in)
- Position: Forward

Youth career
- 2009–2017: Lokomotiv Plovdiv
- 2017–2019: Sheffield Wednesday

Senior career*
| Years | Team | Apps | (Gls) |
| 2016–2017 | Lokomotiv Plovdiv | 3 | (0) |
| 2019–2020 | Ansar | 0 | (0) |
| Total | | 3 | (0) |

International career
| 2016 | Bulgaria U16 | 8 | (4) |
| 2016 | Bulgaria U17 | 8 | (0) |
| 2019 | Bulgaria U18 | 1 | (0) |
| 2019 | Lebanon U19 | 3 | (0) |
- * Club domestic league appearances and goals

Eyad Omar Hammoud (Arabic: إياد عمر حمود; Bulgarian: Ияд Омар Хамуд; born 24 July 2001) is a former professional footballer who played as a forward.

Born in Lebanon to a Lebanese father and a Bulgarian mother, Hammoud moved to Bulgaria at a young age and obtained citizenship; he represented Bulgaria at youth level between 2016 and 2019, before switching allegiance to Lebanon.

== Club career ==
=== Lokomotiv Plovdiv ===
Hammoud made his professional debut for Lokomotiv Plovdiv on 20 November 2016, in the local derby against Botev Plovdiv. At age of 15 years, 3 months and 26 days he became the second-youngest player to play in Bulgarian First League. Lokomotiv won the match 2–0, with Hammoud assisting the first goal.

=== Sheffield Wednesday ===
In the beginning of 2017, Hammoud trialled with Sheffield Wednesday, returning to Lokomotiv with and option to sign with the team in the summer. On 27 June 2017, he signed a two-year contract with the club, joining the under-18 team until gaining a work permit. Hammoud trialed with Preston North End in April 2019, but returned to Sheffield until he was released by the club on 8 May.

=== Ansar ===
On 6 August 2019, Hammoud signed for Lebanese Premier League side Ansar on a five-year deal.

== International career ==
On 23 May 2017, Hammoud played for Bulgaria U16 in the 1–1 draw against Cyprus U16. He was also called up for the U18 team in March 2019 to play two friendly games against Ukraine U18. In August 2019 Hammoud switched allegiance to Lebanon, representing his native country's under-19 team in two friendly games against Armenia.

== Style of play ==
A center forward with technical skills, Hammoud is a fast player, both on and off the ball, with vision and positioning in the field. Hammoud's link up play with his teammates, as well as his focus on the goal, are important in his teams' attacking plays.

== Personal life ==
Hammoud was born in Majdal Anjar, Lebanon. His father, Omar, is Lebanese and his mother, Maria, is Bulgarian from Burgas. He moved with his family to Plovdiv, Bulgaria, in 2009 at the age of eight. He holds dual citizenship, Lebanese and Bulgarian.

== Career statistics ==
=== Club ===
As of 3 December 2016

| Club | Season | League | | | National Cup (Note: Includes the Bulgarian Cup) | | Total | |
| Club | Season | Division | Apps | Goals | Apps | Goals | Apps | Goals |
|---|---|---|---|---|---|---|---|---|
| Lokomotiv Plovdiv | 2016–17 | First League | 3 | 0 | 0 | 0 | 3 | 0 |
| Career statistics | | | 3 | 0 | 0 | 0 | 3 | 0 |

== Honours ==
Sheffield Wednesday

- U18 Professional Development League Division 2: 2018–19
- U18 Professional Development League Division 2 North: 2018–19

Individual

- Bulgarian First League Debut of the Year: 2016 (Note: Jointly shared with Kristian Dobrev.)
