= Scott Banks =

Scottish footballer (born 2001)

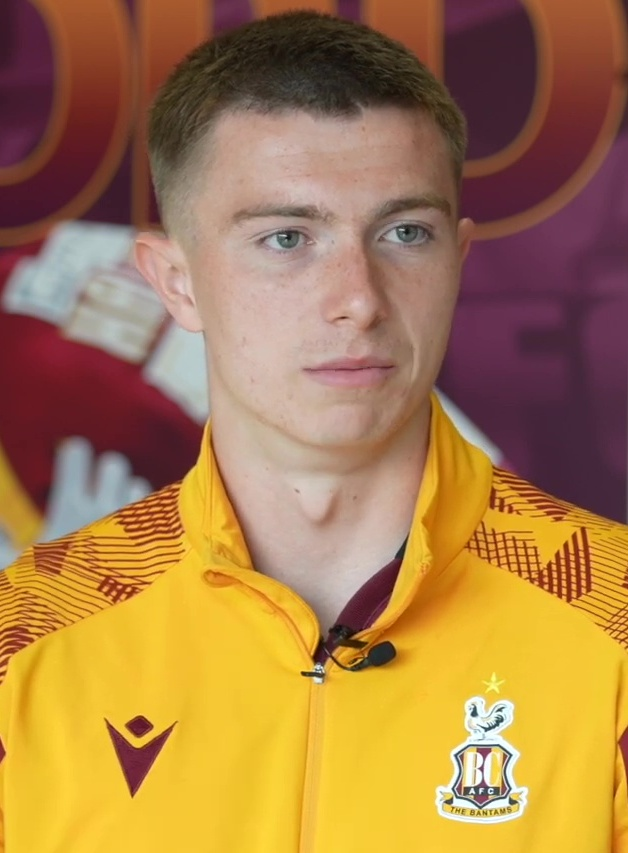
- Banks in 2022

Personal information
- Full name: Scott Brian Banks
- Date of birth: 26 September 2001 (age 25)
- Place of birth: Linlithgow, Scotland
- Height: 1.83 m (6 ft 0 in)
- Positions: Attacking midfielder; winger

Team information
- Current team: FC St. Pauli
- Number: 17

Youth career
- Linlithgow Rose CFC
- 2013–2018: Dundee United

Senior career*
Years	Team	Apps	(Gls)
2018–2020	Dundee United	1	(0)
2019	→ Clyde (loan)	12	(1)
2020–2024	Crystal Palace	0	(0)
2020	→ Alloa Athletic (loan)	4	(0)
2021	→ Dunfermline Athletic (loan)	11	(0)
2022–2023	→ Bradford City (loan)	29	(6)
2023–2024	→ FC St. Pauli (loan)	4	(0)
2024–	FC St. Pauli	13	(0)
2025–2026	→ Blackpool (loan)	14	(1)
2026	→ Barnsley (loan)	22	(3)

International career
2019	Scotland U19	2	(0)
2021–2022	Scotland U21	7	(0)
- * Club domestic league appearances and goals as of 14 August 2026

Scott Brian Banks (born 26 September 2001) is a Scottish professional footballer who plays as an attacking midfielder or winger for 2. Bundesliga club FC St. Pauli.

Banks began his career in Scotland with Dundee United, and has also played for Clyde, Alloa Athletic and Dunfermline Athletic on loan. He made his debut for the Scotland under-21 team in 2021.

== Early life ==
Banks comes from Linlithgow, West Lothian, and attended the Scottish Football Association performance school at Graeme High School in Falkirk.

== Club career ==
Banks joined Dundee United at youth level from Linlithgow Rose Community Football Club in 2013. After being top scorer for the United under-17 team the previous season, he signed his first professional contract with the club in 2018.

In February 2019, Banks joined League Two club Clyde on loan for the rest of the 2018–19 season, quickly becoming a "fans' favourite". He scored the club's goal of the season against Peterhead and was man of the match against Annan Athletic in the match that secured Clyde's promotion from League Two.

After impressing manager Robbie Neilson in pre-season matches, Banks made his Dundee United debut as a substitute against Heart of Midlothian in the Scottish League Cup in July 2019. The following month, United reportedly turned down a £400,000 transfer bid for Banks from Premier League club Crystal Palace. Following this, Banks rejected a new contract offer from Dundee United and was left out of the squad by Neilson.

In January 2020, Banks signed a three-year contract with Crystal Palace. Later in January, Palace loaned Banks to Alloa Athletic until the end of the 2019–20 season.

In January 2021, Banks was signed on a loan deal by Scottish Championship side Dunfermline Athletic until the end of the 2020–21 Season.

On 8 August 2022, Banks joined EFL League Two club Bradford City on a season-long loan. At the end of his successful loan spell with the Bantams he was awarded the Supporters Trust Young Player of the Year.

On 10 August 2023, Banks moved on a new loan to St. Pauli in German 2. Bundesliga. After just three substitute appearances, Banks suffered a serious knee injury on 1 September 2023. He returned to the side as a substitute in the last game of the season, providing a crucial late assist to the winning goal as St. Pauli clinched the Bundesliga 2 title. The transfer was made permanent.

Banks joined Blackpool, of England's League One, on a season-long loan on 1 September 2025. He scored two goals, his first and second for the club, in a 5–0 victory over Barrow in the EFL Trophy on 16 September. On 26 January 2026, he moved on a new loan to Barnsley, also in League One.

== International career ==
Banks made two appearances for the Scotland under-19 team, both in friendly matches against Japan played in Pinatar, Spain, during September 2019. He was called up to the under-21 squad for the first time in 2021, for two friendly matches against Northern Ireland at the Dumbarton Football Stadium. He made his debut at under-21 international in the first match, a 2–1 win for Scotland.

Prior to being called up for Scotland under-21s, Banks had held talks with Wales under-21 coach Paul Bodin with a view to joining their squad, as he is also eligible to represent Wales.

== Career statistics ==
As of match played 23 August 2026

Appearances and goals by club, season and competition
Club	Season	League			National cup		League cup		Other		Total	
Club	Season	Division	Apps	Goals	Apps	Goals	Apps	Goals	Apps	Goals	Apps	Goals
Dundee United	2018–19	Scottish Championship	0	0	0	0	0	0	0	0	0	0
Dundee United	2019–20	Scottish Championship	1	0	0	0	3	0	0	0	4	0
Dundee United	Total		1	0	0	0	3	0	0	0	4	0
Clyde (loan)	2018–19	Scottish League Two	12	1	0	0	0	0	3 (Note: Appearances in Scottish League Two play-offs)	0	15	1
Crystal Palace	2019–20	Premier League	0	0	0	0	0	0	0	0	0	0
Crystal Palace	2020–21	Premier League	0	0	0	0	0	0	0	0	0	0
Crystal Palace	2021–22	Premier League	0	0	0	0	0	0	2 (Note: Appearances in EFL Trophy)	0	2	0
Crystal Palace	2022–23	Premier League	0	0	0	0	0	0	0	0	0	0
Crystal Palace	Total		13	1	0	0	3	0	5	0	21	1
Alloa Athletic (loan)	2019–20	Scottish Championship	4	0	0	0	0	0	0	0	4	0
Dunfermline Athletic (loan)	2020–21	Scottish Championship	11	0	0	0	0	0	2 (Note: Appearances in Scottish Championship play-offs)	0	13	0
Bradford City (loan)	2022–23	League Two	29	6	1	0	2	0	4 (Note: Two appearances in EFL Trophy, two appearances in play offs)	0	36	6
St. Pauli (loan)	2023–24	2. Bundesliga	4	0	0	0	0	0	0	0	4	0
St. Pauli	2024–25	Bundesliga	12	0	0	0	0	0	0	0	12	0
St. Pauli	2026–27	2. Bundesliga	1	0	1	0	—		0	0	2	0
St. Pauli	Total		13	0	1	0	0	0	0	0	14	0
Blackpool (loan)	2025–26	League One	14	1	3	1	—		3 (Note: Appearances in EFL Trophy)	3	20	5
Barnsley (loan)	2025–26	League One	22	3	—		—		—		22	3
Career total			110	11	5	1	5	0	14	3	134	15

== Honours ==
FC St. Pauli

- 2.Bundesliga : 2023–24
