= Matty Bowman =

English footballer (born 2000)

Personal information
- Full name: Matthew Bowman
- Date of birth: 26 November 2000 (age 25)
- Place of birth: Scarborough, England
- Height: 1.73 m (5 ft 8 in)
- Position: Defender

Team information
- Current team: Coventry Sphinx

Youth career
- 2010—2013: Middlesbrough
- 2013—2016: Hull City

Senior career*
Years	Team	Apps	(Gls)
2018—2019	Scarborough Athletic	4	(0)
2019—2021	Dunfermline Athletic	0	(0)
2020	→ Pickering Town (loan)	5	(0)
2021—2023	Loughborough Students	64	(16)
2023	Basford United	13	(0)
2023—2024	Mickleover	8	(0)
2024	Bridlington Town	5	(0)
2025	Pickering Town	12	(1)
Total		111	(17)
- * Club domestic league appearances and goals

Matthew 'Matty' Bowman (born 26 November 2000) is an English footballer who plays as a defender.

== Club career ==
Bowman came through the Middlesbrough and Hull City Academies before joining Repton School to complete his A Levels and be involved in their football programme. Bowman was signed by Scottish Championship club Dunfermline Athletic on 29 May 2019, on a two-year deal. In February 2020, Bowman joined Pickering Town on loan before returning to Dunfermline at the end of the season. On 14 November, Bowman made his professional debut in a 3–2 win against Clyde, in the Scottish League Cup, aged 19. Bowman left Dunfermline in January 2021 by mutual agreement.

Bowman joined Loughborough University in 2021 where he represented Loughborough Students. Bowman left Loughborough Students in 2023 to join Basford United, and has since represented Mickleover, Bridlington Town, and Pickering Town. In 2025, Bowman signed for Coventry Sphinx in the Northern Premier League – Midlands Division.

== Career statistics ==
Appearances and goals by club, season and competition
Club	Season	League			FA Cup		League Cup		Other		Total	
Club	Season	Division	Apps	Goals	Apps	Goals	Apps	Goals	Apps	Goals	Apps	Goals
Dunfermline Athletic	2019–20	Scottish Championship	0	0	0	0	0	0	0	0	0	0
Dunfermline Athletic	2020–21	Scottish Championship	0	0	0	0	1	0	0	0	1	0
Dunfermline Athletic	Total		0	0	0	0	1	0	0	0	1	0
Career total			0	0	0	0	1	0	0	0	1	0
