= Sheffield Hallam University Sports Park =

Sports venue in Sheffield, South Yorkshire, England

Coordinates: 53.4065°N 1.3869°W

- Bawtry Road
- Interactive map of Sheffield Hallam University Sports Park
- Full name: Sheffield Hallam University Sports Park
- Location: Bawtry Road, Sheffield, South Yorkshire, England
- Owner: Sheffield Hallam University
- Operator: Sheffield Hallam University
- Capacity: 3,000
- Surface: Grass

Tenants
- Sheffield Hallam University (1992–present); Sheffield Hallam Eagles (2013–present); Sheffield Eagles (2016); Sheffield Wednesday Academy (2026–)

Sheffield Hallam University Sports Park is a multipurpose sports venue in Sheffield, England, that is owned and run by Sheffield Hallam University.

== History ==
The venue was opened in 1992 when Sheffield Hallam University officially gained university status. It has since been used by a variety of the university's sports teams including football and rugby league. In 2013 rugby league team Sheffield Eagles joined with SHU to form the Sheffield Hallam Eagles which acts as a reserve team for the Sheffield Eagles. In 2016 Sheffield Eagles became tenants while the Sheffield Olympic Legacy Stadium was being built.

In June 2026, Sheffield Wednesday's Academy relocated to the Sheffield Hallam University Sports Park following their takeover by Arise Capital.
