= Vytas Gašpuitis =

Lithuanian footballer

Personal information
- Date of birth: 4 March 1994 (age 32)
- Place of birth: Šiauliai, Lithuania
- Height: 1.97 m (6 ft 6 in)
- Position: Centre-back

Youth career
- Šiauliai

Senior career*
Years	Team	Apps	(Gls)
2011–2016	Šiauliai	71	(4)
2012	→ Venta (loan)	0	(0)
2016–2018	Atlantas	46	(1)
2018–2021	Panevėžys	49	(5)
2021–2022	Dunfermline Athletic	18	(0)
2022–2023	Šiauliai	24	(0)
2023	Song Lam Nghe An	16	(1)
2024–2025	Šiauliai	46	(3)
2026	Garudayaksa	10	(0)

International career
2016	Lithuania U21	3	(0)
2020–2021	Lithuania	11	(0)
- * Club domestic league appearances and goals as of 9 May 2026

Vytas Gašpuitis (born 4 March 1994) is a Lithuanian footballer who plays as a centre-back.

== Club career ==
Gašpuitis began his career with his hometown club Šiauliai in the A Lyga, spending five years with the side that included a spell on loan with lower league club Venta Kuršėnai. He subsequently spent two years each with Atlantas and Panevėžys, before joining Scottish Championship side Dunfermline Athletic in February 2021. He made his debut coming on for Scott Banks in the second half of a match against Greenock Morton on March 13, 2021. Gašpuitis and Dunfermline agreed to mutually terminate his contract in January 2022 in order to allow him to return to Lithuania.

== International career ==
Gašpuitis made his international debut for Lithuania on 11 November 2020 in a friendly match against the Faroe Islands.

== Career statistics ==
=== International ===
As of match played 15 November 2021

Lithuania
Year	Apps	Goals
2020	3	0
2021	8	0
Total	11	0

== Honours ==
Garudayaksa

- Championship: 2025–26
