= Raoul Giger =

Swiss footballer (born 1997)

Personal information
- Full name: Raoul Luca Giger
- Date of birth: 29 October 1997 (age 29)
- Place of birth: Aargau, Switzerland
- Height: 1.80 m (5 ft 11 in)
- Position: Right-back

Team information
- Current team: Wisła Kraków
- Number: 34

Youth career
- 2003–2009: FC Gränichen
- 2009–2015: Aarau

Senior career*
Years	Team	Apps	(Gls)
2015–2017	Team Aargau U21	49	(4)
2016–2022	Aarau	151	(1)
2022–2025	Lausanne-Sport	95	(1)
2025–	Wisła Kraków	25	(0)
- * Club domestic league appearances and goals as of 13:44, 26 May 2026 (UTC)

Raoul Luca Giger (born 29 October 1997) is a Swiss professional footballer who plays as a right-back for Ekstraklasa club Wisła Kraków.

== Club career ==
Giger is a product of the youth academies of the Swiss clubs FC Gränichen and Aarau. He began his senior career with Aarau's reserves Aargau U21 in 2015. He debuted with the senior Aarau team in a 1–1 Challenge League tie with FC Zürich on 25 September 2016. On 18 January 2018, he extended his contract until 2021. On 21 January 2021, he extended his contract with Aarau until 2021 with an option to extend for 2 more seasons. After more than 150 matches in the Challenge League, he transferred to Lausanne-Sport on 14 June 2022. In his first season with Lausanne-Sport they achieved promotion to the Swiss Super League.

On 12 August 2025, Giger transferred to the Polish I liga club Wisła Kraków on a contract until 2026 with an option to extend for another year. On 24 March 2026, the option to extend was triggerred until 2027.

== Honours ==
Wisła Kraków

- I liga: 2025–26
