= Gabby McGill =

English footballer

Personal information
- Full name: Gabriel McGill
- Date of birth: 4 September 2000 (age 26)
- Place of birth: York, England
- Height: 1.81 m (5 ft 11 in)
- Position: Forward

Team information
- Current team: Airdrieonians
- Number: 23

Youth career
- 2014–2017: York City
- 2017–2019: Middlesbrough

Senior career*
Years	Team	Apps	(Gls)
2019–2021	Dunfermline Athletic	13	(1)
2020–2021	→ Edinburgh City (loan)	8	(2)
2021	→ York City (loan)	1	(0)
2021–2024	Airdrieonians	79	(24)
- * Club domestic league appearances and goals as of 10 May 2024

Gabriel 'Gabby' McGill (born 4 June 2000) is an English footballer who plays as a forward. McGill previously played youth football with York City and Middlesbrough, senior footballer with Dunfermline Athletic and Airdrieonians and had spells on loan with Edinburgh City and York City.

== Club career ==
McGill, son of York City chairman Jason McGill, started his career with the Bootham Crescent club, playing for their youth squads over a three-year period. In July 2017, McGill was signed by EFL Championship side Middlesbrough on a two-year deal.

After spending two years with the Middlesbrough youth sides, McGill was signed by Scottish Championship club Dunfermline Athletic on 30 May 2019, after the two clubs agreed a development fee. In October 2020, McGill joined Scottish League Two club Edinburgh City until January 2021. McGill subsequently returned to York City for the remainder of the season on loan, and left Dunfermline at the end of his contract in May 2021.

McGill signed with Scottish League One club Airdrieonians in July 2021. McGill played a pivotal role in Airdrieonians gaining promotion to the Scottish Championship scoring a number of important goals including goals in the play-off semi-final and final.

== Career statistics ==
As of 1 June 2021

Appearances and goals by club, season and competition
Club	Season	League			FA Cup		League Cup		Other		Total	
Club	Season	Division	Apps	Goals	Apps	Goals	Apps	Goals	Apps	Goals	Apps	Goals
Dunfermline Athletic	2019–20	Scottish Championship	13	1	0	0	4	0	1 (Note: Appearances in the Scottish Challenge Cup)	0	18	1
Dunfermline Athletic	2020–21	Scottish Championship	0	0	0	0	1	0	0	0	1	0
Dunfermline Athletic	Total		13	1	0	0	5	0	1	0	19	1
Edinburgh City	2020–21	Scottish League Two	8	2	0	0	0	0	0	0	8	2
York City	2020–21	National League North	1	0	0	0	0	0	0	0	1	0
Career total			22	3	0	0	5	0	1	0	28	3
