= Fernando Carro =

Fernando Carro may refer to:

- Fernando Carro (businessman) (born 1964), Spanish football director who is the CEO of Bayer Leverkusen
- Fernando Carro (athlete) (born 1992), Spanish athlete specialising in the 3000 metres steeplechase
