= Sheffield Wednesday F.C. Academy =

Coordinates: 53.414°N 1.507°W

Sheffield Wednesday Academy
- Full name: Sheffield Wednesday Football Club Youth Academy
- Nickname: The Owls
- Short name: Owls
- Founded: 1948
- Ground: Sheffield Hallam University Sports Park; Sheffield
- Academy manager: Jonathan Pepper
- League: Professional Development League

The Sheffield Wednesday Academy is the youth system of Sheffield Wednesday Football Club.

The academy runs two sides; the U21 Development squad, and the U18 Academy. Both play in the respective age groups' Professional Development League.

== History ==
=== League history ===
- 1957–58: Sheffield Intermediate League
- 1958–59 to 1997–98: Northern Intermediate League
- 1997–98: Premier Youth League
- 1998–99 to 2011–12: Premier Academy League
- 2012–13 to present: Professional Development League

== Honours ==
- FA Youth Cup: runners-up 1991
- Northern Intermediate League Cup: winners 1982, 1989, 1993
- Professional U23 Development League 2 North: winners 2016–17
- Professional U23 Development League 2: winners 2016–17
- Professional U18 Development League 2 North: winners 2018–19
- Professional U18 Development League 2: winners 2018–19

== Players ==
=== Under-21s ===
As of 11 November 2026

Note: Flags indicate national team as defined under FIFA eligibility rules; some limited exceptions apply. Players may hold more than one non-FIFA nationality.

No.	Pos.	Nation	Player
31	DF	ENG	Louis Poland
42	DF	ENG	Will McPartland
—	MF	POR	Bruno Fernandes

No.	Pos.	Nation	Player
—	MF	ENG	Joel Martin
—	MF	CAN	Aodhan Sopala

==== Out on loan ====
Note: Flags indicate national team as defined under FIFA eligibility rules; some limited exceptions apply. Players may hold more than one non-FIFA nationality.

No.	Pos.	Nation	Player
34	MF	ENG	Fortune Onoh (on loan to Beverley Town)
38	MF	ENG	Denny Oliver (on loan to Pontefract Collieries)
44	FW	ENG	Joel Akpobi (on loan to Pontefract Collieries)
46	DF	ENG	Kailen Hatfield (on loan to Stalybridge Celtic)

No.	Pos.	Nation	Player
47	FW	NGR	Samuel Duruh (on loan to Beverley Town)
—	GK	WAL	Logan Stretch (on loan to Buxton)
—	DF	ENG	Reece Johnson (on loan to Eastleigh)
—	MF	SCO	Joshua Bayliss (on loan to Farnborough)

=== Under-18s ===
As of 11 November 2026

Note: Flags indicate national team as defined under FIFA eligibility rules; some limited exceptions apply. Players may hold more than one non-FIFA nationality.

No.	Pos.	Nation	Player
36	MF	ENG	James Kay
39	DF	ENG	Harrison Langford
41	MF	ENG	Kleven De Oliveira
43	FW	ENG	Charlie Liddell
49	GK	ENG	Oliver Bramhall
—	GK	ENG	Charlie Hobbs
—	GK	ENG	Louis Hutchinson
—	GK	ENG	Thomas Streets
—	DF	ENG	Jack Barraclough Faulkner
—	DF	ENG	Jamie Darley
—	DF	ENG	Noah Dixon

No.	Pos.	Nation	Player
—	DF	ENG	Perry Ridge
—	DF	ENG	Reuben Selby
—	MF	ENG	Roman Cawley
—	MF	ENG	Harry Chadbourne
—	MF	ENG	Dennis Kohn
—	MF	ENG	Sammy Omoniyi
—	MF	ENG	Logan Scott
—	MF	ENG	Benji Sedgwick
—	MF	ENG	Oscar Wildman
—	FW	ENG	Charlie Robinson

== Academy staff ==
As of 5 November 2026

Role	Name
Academy manager	(England) Jonathan Pepper
U21 manager	(England) Mark Burton
U21 coach	(England) Giles Coke
U18 manager	(England) Luke Morgan
Assistant PDP coach	(England) Lee Gregory
PDP coach	(England) Andy Holdsworth

== Graduates ==
The following list includes players who have graduated from Sheffield Wednesday's youth system to make their senior debut for the first team. Players who currently represent the Sheffield Wednesday senior team are highlighted in italics. Players who have represented their national team at senior level are highlighted in bold.

As of 10 July 2026

- (Ghana) **Junior Agogo**
- (England) Yisa Alao
- (England) Mark Beevers
- (England) Luke Boden
- (Republic of Ireland) Ciaran Brennan
- (England) Leigh Bromby
- (England) George Brown
- (Jamaica) **Bailey Cadamarteri**
- (Northern Ireland) **Pierce Charles**
- (England) Tony Crane
- (England) Cameron Dawson
- (England) Joe Emery
- (Portugal) Bruno Fernandes
- (Zimbabwe) **Sean Fusire**
- (Republic of Ireland) Derek Geary
- (Wales) Will Grainger
- (England) Matt Hamshaw
- (England) Steve Haslam
- (Scotland) **George Hirst**
- (England) Ritchie Humphreys
- (England) Alex Hunt
- (England) Arron Jameson
- (England) Reece Johnson
- (England) Connor Kirby
- (Norway) Rocky Lekaj
- (England) Mackenzie Maltby
- (England) Sean McAllister
- (Northern Ireland) **Rory McArdle**
- (England) Lewis McMahon
- (England) Nathan Modest
- (Northern Ireland) Devlan Moses
- (England) Richard O'Donnell
- (England) Favour Onukwuli
- (Scotland) **Liam Palmer**
- (England) Matt Penney
- (Zimbabwe) **Joey Phuthi**
- (England) Kevin Pressman
- (Scotland) Fraser Preston
- (England) Jon Shaw
- (England) Liam Shaw
- (England) Rio Shipston
- (England) Tommy Spurr
- (England) Jack Stobbs
- (England) Chris Stringer
- (England) Drew Talbot
- (England) Jarvis Thornton
- (England) Ernie Weaver
- (England) Joe Wildsmith
- (England) Richard Wood
