= Archie Brown (footballer) =

English footballer (born 2002)

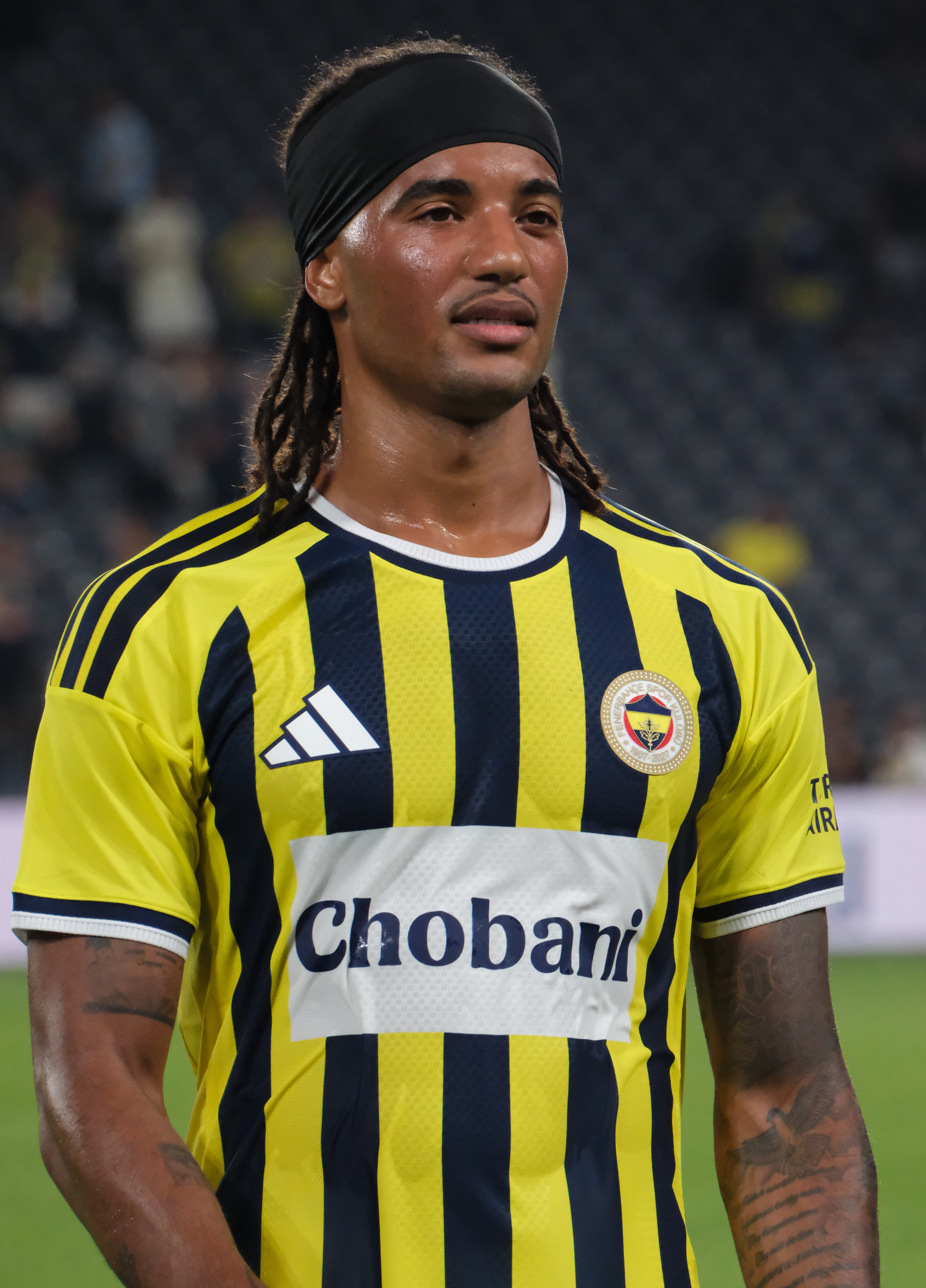
- Brown playing for Fenerbahçe in 2026

Personal information
- Full name: Archibald Norman Brown
- Date of birth: 28 May 2002 (age 24)
- Place of birth: Birmingham, England
- Height: 6 ft 3 in (1.90 m)
- Positions: Left-back; left midfielder

Team information
- Current team: Fenerbahçe
- Number: 3

Youth career
- West Bromwich Albion
- 2017–2021: Derby County

Senior career*
| Years | Team | Apps | (Gls) |
| 2021–2022 | Lausanne-Sport II | 4 | (1) |
| 2021–2023 | Lausanne-Sport | 41 | (5) |
| 2023–2025 | Gent | 63 | (1) |
| 2025– | Fenerbahçe | 33 | (3) |

International career
| 2024 | England U20 | 2 | (1) |
- * Club domestic league appearances and goals as of 26 October 2026

Archibald Norman Brown (born 28 May 2002) is an English professional footballer who plays as a left-back or left midfielder for Süper Lig club Fenerbahçe.

Born in Birmingham, Brown spent his youth career in the academies of West Bromwich Albion and Derby County before moving abroad to begin his senior professional career. He made his professional debut with Swiss club Lausanne-Sport in 2021, spending two seasons there before transferring to Belgian Pro League side Gent in 2023. Following a standout period in Belgium, he signed with Turkish giants Fenerbahçe in July 2025. He was instrumental in helping the club qualify for the 2026–27 UEFA Champions League, scoring a decisive goal against Lyon in the play-off round.

Brown has represented England at the under-20 international level, scoring his first international goal against the Republic of Ireland under-21s in June 2024, in which the game ended in a 2-2 draw.

== Club career ==
=== Early career ===
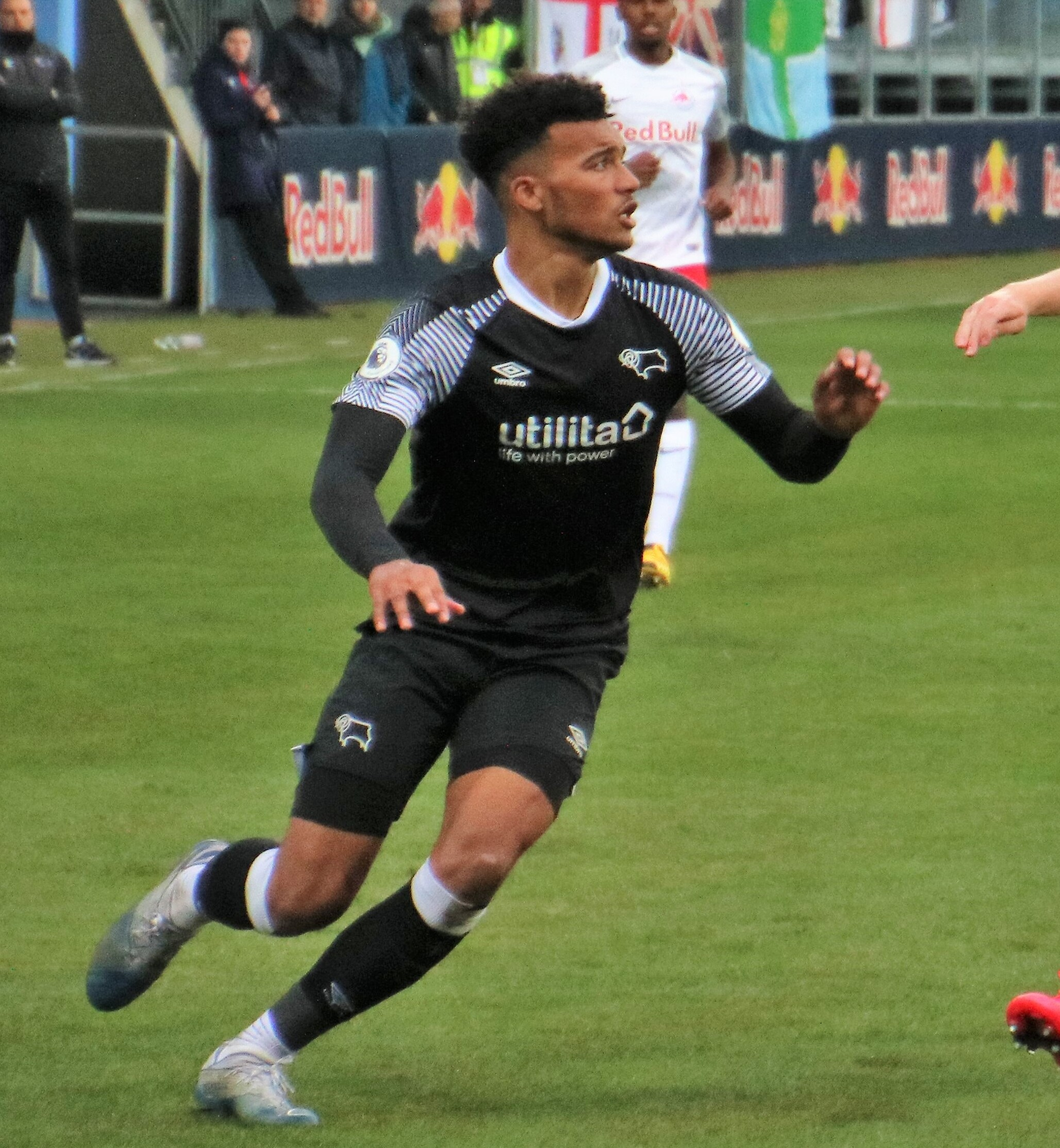
Brown playing for Derby County in 2020

Brown began his youth career with the West Bromwich Albion Academy, which is located about 7 miles (11 kilometres) northwest of his hometown, Birmingham. At the age of 15, he joined the youth academy of another English club, Derby County, where he helped the team win their first and only youth top-flight title, the 2018–19 U18 Premier League. He scored a hat-trick and provided an assist in the final game against the Arsenal U18s. Over the course of his time with the Derby County Reserves and Academy Teams, he recorded 18 goals and 14 assists in 72 matches.

=== Lausanne-Sport ===
In 2021, Brown signed for Lausanne-Sport in Switzerland. He made his debut for the club on 28 November 2021 in a 3–0 Swiss Super League game loss to Servette.

On 10 February 2023, he scored his first professional goal in a win against Neuchâtel Xamax.

=== Gent ===
On 11 August 2023, Brown signed a four-year contract with Belgian club Gent. He became the fourth English player to represent the club.

He made his league debut on 20 August 2023 in a Belgian Pro League match against Sint-Truiden. On 24 August 2023, he made his European debut in the first leg of the UEFA Europa Conference League play-off round, contributing to a 2–0 home win over APOEL.

=== Fenerbahçe ===
==== 2025–26 season ====
On 12 July 2025, Fenerbahçe announced that Brown had joined the club on a three-year deal for just under £7 million, with an option to extend.

He made his debut on 6 August 2025 in the first leg of the UEFA Champions League third qualifying round, a 2–1 away defeat to Feyenoord. On 12 August 2025, in the return leg, he scored and provided two assists to help the team progress to the play-off round of the Champions League qualifying.

Brown made his Süper Lig debut on 16 August 2025 in a 0–0 away draw against Göztepe. He scored his first Süper Lig goal a week later, on 23 August 2025, in a 3–1 home win over Kocaelispor.

In the 2025–26 season, he recorded 3 goals and 2 assists in 25 Süper Lig matches, and 5 goals and 6 assists in 38 matches across all competitions.

==== 2026–27 season ====
On 26 August 2026, he scored in a 2–1 away win against Lyon in 2026–27 UEFA Champions League play-off round second leg. On 10 September, he scored his team's goal in the in the 1–1 draw against Roma, during the opening week of the 2026–27 UEFA Champions League league phase and also named Player of the Match, scoring the club's first UEFA Champions League goal in 18 years, making him the first player to score for the club in the competition since Colin Kazim-Richards scored against Porto in November 2008, and named Player of the Match, also elected for Champions League Team of the Week: Matchday 1. On 4 November 2026, he scored one goal and made an assist that helped his team secure a 3–2 victory over Liverpool, in the 2026–27 UEFA Champions League match played at Chobani Stadium, and also elected for Champions League Team of the Week: Matchday 4, second time in this season.

== International career ==
On 7 June 2024, Brown made his debut for the England U20s in a 2–1 win over Sweden at Stadion ŠRC Sesvete. Four days later, he scored his first international goal in a 2–2 draw with the Republic of Ireland U21s.

== Style of play ==
Brown has been deployed in several positions throughout his career, including full-back, wing-back, winger, and occasionally as a left forward. He is noted for his composure in defence and his ability to contribute in attacking phases.

== Personal life ==
Born and raised in Birmingham, England, Brown is of Jamaican descent and can also represent the country at international level.

His father is an Arsenal fan, he said he looked up to Ashley Cole as his idol when he was playing in the youth ranks, and he had the chance to train with his idol in 2019 while playing for Derby County youth academy.

== Career statistics ==
As of match played 4 November 2026

Appearances and goals by club, season and competition
| Club | Season | League | | | National cup (Note: Includes Swiss Cup, Belgian Cup and Turkish Cup) | | Europe | | Other | | Total | |
| Club | Season | Division | Apps | Goals | Apps | Goals | Apps | Goals | Apps | Goals | Apps | Goals |
|---|---|---|---|---|---|---|---|---|---|---|---|---|
| Lausanne-Sport | 2021–22 | Swiss Super League | 4 | 0 | 0 | 0 | — | | 4 (Note: Appearances in 1. Liga Classic) | 1 | 8 | 1 |
| Lausanne-Sport | 2022–23 | Swiss Challenge League | 34 | 5 | 2 | 0 | — | | — | | 36 | 5 |
| Lausanne-Sport | 2023–24 | Swiss Super League | 3 | 0 | 0 | 0 | — | | — | | 3 | 0 |
| Lausanne-Sport | Total | | 41 | 5 | 2 | 0 | — | | 4 | 1 | 47 | 6 |
| Gent | 2023–24 | Belgian Pro League | 31 | 0 | 2 | 0 | 8 (Note: Appearances in UEFA (Europa) Conference League) | 0 | — | | 41 | 0 |
| Gent | 2024–25 | Belgian Pro League | 32 | 1 | 0 | 0 | 14 | 2 | — | | 46 | 3 |
| Gent | Total | | 63 | 1 | 2 | 0 | 22 | 2 | — | | 87 | 3 |
| Fenerbahçe | 2025–26 | Süper Lig | 25 | 3 | 2 | 1 | 11 (Note: Four appearances and one goal in UEFA Champions League, seven appearances in UEFA Europa League) | 1 | 0 | 0 | 38 | 5 |
| Fenerbahçe | 2026–27 | Süper Lig | 8 | 0 | 0 | 0 | 8 (Note: Appearances in UEFA Champions League) | 3 | 0 | 0 | 16 | 3 |
| Fenerbahçe | Total | | 33 | 3 | 2 | 1 | 19 | 4 | 0 | 0 | 54 | 8 |
| Career total | | | 137 | 9 | 6 | 1 | 41 | 6 | 4 | 1 | 188 | 17 |

== Honours ==
Derby County

- U18 Premier League: 2018–19

Fenerbahçe

- Turkish Super Cup: 2025

Individual

- 2026–27 UEFA Champions League Team of the Week: Matchday 1, Matchday 4
