= 2025–26 Dunfermline Athletic F.C. season =

Dunfermline Athletic
2025–26 season
- Chairman: David Cook (until 27 August); Jim Leishman (from 27 August)
- Manager: Neil Lennon
- Stadium: East End Park; Dunfermline, Scotland (capacity: 11,480)
- Scottish Championship: Fourth place
- Premiership play-offs: Semi-finals
- Scottish Cup: Runners-up
- League Cup: Group stage
- Challenge Cup: Second round
- Top goalscorer: League: Andrew Tod (13); All: Andrew Tod (16)
- Highest home attendance: 10,399 vs. Aberdeen, Scottish Cup, 7 March 2026
- Lowest home attendance: 2,389 vs. Stirling Albion, League Cup, 26 July 2025
- Average home league attendance: 5,487

The 2025–26 season was Dunfermline Athletic's third season back in the Scottish Championship, following their promotion from Scottish League One.

== Results and fixtures ==
=== Pre-season ===
| 26 June 2025 Friendly | PFC Slavia Sofia | 1 – 1 | Dunfermline Athletic | Bansko, Bulgaria |
| 15:00 | | Report | Cooper | Stadium: St Petar Stadium |

| 28 June 2025 Friendly | East Kilbride | 1 – 0 | Dunfermline Athletic | East Kilbride, Scotland |
| 15:00 | Robertson 9' | Report | | Stadium: K-Park Training Academy; Referee: Sean Murdoch |

| 5 July 2025 Friendly | Kelty Hearts | 1 – 3 | Dunfermline Athletic | Kelty, Scotland |
| 15:00 | Moore 45' | Report | Cooper 18'; Young 54'; Fyfe 90' | Stadium: New Central Park; Attendance: 1,272; Referee: Jordan Curran |

| 8 July 2025 Friendly | East Fife | 1 – 3 | Dunfermline Athletic | Methil, Scotland |
| 19:30 | Jones 85' | Report | Gilmour 44'; Mcleod 49'; Kane 85' | Stadium: Bayview Stadium; Attendance: 876; Referee: Alastair Grieve |

=== Scottish Championship ===
| 2 August 2025 1 | Greenock Morton | 0 – 0 | Dunfermline Athletic | Greenock, Scotland |
| 15:00 | | Report | | Stadium: Cappielow; Attendance: 2,497; Referee: Dan McFarlane |

| 9 August 2025 2 | Dunfermline Athletic | 2 – 0 | Airdrieonians | Dunfermline, Scotland |
| 15:00 | J.Tod 40'; A.Tod 43' | Report | | Stadium: East End Park; Attendance: 5,598; Referee: Ryan Lee |

| 22 August 2025 3 | Raith Rovers | 2 – 0 | Dunfermline Athletic | Kirkcaldy, Scotland |
| 19:45 | Stevenson 2'; Vaughan 78' | Report | | Stadium: Stark's Park; Attendance: 6,511; Referee: David Dickinson |

| 30 August 2025 4 | Dunfermline Athletic | 2 – 2 | Ross County | Dunfermline, Scotland |
| 15:00 | Chilokoa-Mullen 23'; Rudden 58' | Report | Hale 36', 89' | Stadium: East End Park; Attendance: 4,828; Referee: Nick Walsh |

| 13 September 2025 5 | Arbroath | 0 – 5 | Dunfermline Athletic | Arbroath, Scotland |
| 19:45 | | Report | A.Tod 20', 45+1', 58'; Rudden 65'; MacLeod 76' | Stadium: Gayfield Park; Attendance: 2,074; Referee: David Dickinson |

| 19 September 2025 6 | St Johnstone | 2 – 1 | Dunfermline Athletic | Perth, Scotland |
| 19:45 | Fotheringham 51'; McPake 83' | Report | MacLeod 83' | Stadium: McDiarmid Park; Attendance: 6,232; Referee: Matthew Macdermid |

| 23 September 2025 7 | Dunfermline Athletic | 0 – 1 | Ayr United | Dunfermline, Scotland |
| 19:45 | Chilokoa-Mullen (red card) 47' | Report | McKenzie 9'; Watret (red card) 90+2' | Stadium: East End Park; Attendance: 4,910; Referee: Dan McFarlane |

| 27 September 2025 8 | Dunfermline Athletic | 0 – 2 | Partick Thistle | Dunfermline, Scotland |
| 15:00 | Cáceres (red card) 44' | Report | Watt 1'; Chalmers 10' | Stadium: East End Park; Attendance: 5,629; Referee: Duncan Nicolson |

| 4 October 2025 9 | Dunfermline Athletic | 0 – 0 | Queen's Park | Dunfermline, Scotland |
| 15:00 | | Report | | Stadium: East End Park; Attendance: 4,602; Referee: Grant Irvine |

| 17 October 2025 10 | Dunfermline Athletic | 2 – 0 | Raith Rovers | Dunfermline, Scotland |
| 19:45 | Stewart 19'; Kane 79' | Report | | Stadium: East End Park; Attendance: 6,753; Referee: Nick Walsh |

| 21 October 2025 11 | Airdrieonians | 0 – 4 | Dunfermline Athletic | Airdrie, Scotland |
| 19:45 | McStravick (red card) 40' | Report | A.Tod 39', 42'; M.Todd 47'; Kane 90' | Stadium: Excelsior Stadium; Referee: Calum Scott |

| 25 October 2025 12 | Ross County | 3 – 2 | Dunfermline Athletic | Dingwall, Scotland |
| 15:00 | Fraser 2'; White 3'; Hale 67' | Report | A.Tod 45+1'; Randall 53' (o.g.) | Stadium: Victoria Park; Attendance: 2,771; Referee: Duncan Nicolson |

| 31 October 2025 13 | Ayr United | 0 – 1 | Dunfermline Athletic | Ayr, Scotland |
| 19:45 | | Report | Stewart 42' | Stadium: Somerset Park; Attendance: 2,015; Referee: Grant Irvine |

| 8 November 2025 14 | Dunfermline Athletic | 2 – 2 | St Johnstone | Dunfermline, Scotland |
| 15:00 | Stewart 8'; A.Tod 90+1' | Report | McAlear 30'; Smith 66' | Stadium: East End Park; Attendance: 6,894; Referee: Ross Hardie |

| 22 November 2025 15 | Dunfermline Athletic | 1 – 0 | Greenock Morton | Dunfermline, Scotland |
| 15:00 | Gilmour 16' | Report | | Stadium: East End Park; Attendance: 4,989; Referee: Colin Steven |

| 25 November 2025 16 | Partick Thistle | 1 – 0 | Dunfermline Athletic | Glasgow, Scotland |
| 19:45 | Fitzpatrick 25' | Report | | Stadium: Firhill Stadium; Attendance: 2,893; Referee: Calum Scott |

| 6 December 2025 17 | Dunfermline Athletic | 1 – 2 | Arbroath | Dunfermline, Scotland |
| 15:00 | Stewart 61' | Report | Kabongolo 75', 90+4' | Stadium: East End Park; Attendance: 4,900; Referee: David Dickinson |

| 13 December 2025 18 | Queen's Park | 1 – 1 | Dunfermline Athletic | Glasgow, Scotland |
| 15:00 | Fieldson 40' | Report | Gilmour 81' | Stadium: Lesser Hampden; Attendance: 906; Referee: Iain Snedden |

| 20 December 2025 19 | Dunfermline Athletic | 2 – 3 | Ayr United | Dunfermline, Scotland |
| 15:00 | Ngwenya 63', 65' | Report | McKenzie 5'; Dowds 26'; King 45+4' | Stadium: East End Park; Attendance: 4,961; Referee: Calum Scott |

| 27 December 2025 20 | Raith Rovers | 1 – 2 | Dunfermline Athletic | Kirkcaldy, Scotland |
| 15:00 | Easton 60' (pen.) | Report | A.Tod 33'; Stewart 41' | Stadium: Stark's Park; Attendance: 6,773; Referee: Dan McFarlane |

| 24 January 2026 21 | St Johnstone | 0 – 1 | Dunfermline Athletic | Perth, Scotland |
| 15:00 | | Report | Fraser 50' | Stadium: McDiarmid Park; Attendance: 8,347; Referee: David Dickinson |

| 31 January 2026 22 | Dunfermline Athletic | 0 – 2 | Airdrieonians | Dunfermline, Scotland |
| 15:00 | Hamilton (red card) 55' | Report | Henderson 14'; McGrattan 82' | Stadium: East End Park; Attendance: 5,314; Referee: Peter Stuart |

| 17 February 2026 23 | Greenock Morton | 2 – 0 | Dunfermline Athletic | Greenock, Scotland |
| 19:45 | Brophy 22'; MacPherson 65' (pen.) | Report | Ngwenya (red card) 53' | Stadium: Cappielow; Attendance: 1,559; Referee: Greg Soutar |

| 21 February 2026 24 | Arbroath | 4 – 2 | Dunfermline Athletic | Arbroath, Scotland |
| 19:45 | Dow 2'; Muirhead 49'; Mehmet 67' (o.g.); Marshall 89'; MacIntyre (red card) 90+4' | Report | A.Tod 14'; Cooper 82' | Stadium: Gayfield Park; Attendance: 1,809; Referee: Kevin Clancy |

| 24 February 2026 25 | Dunfermline Athletic | 2 – 2 | Partick Thistle | Dunfermline, Scotland |
| 15:00 | Abdulai 50'; Ngwenya 90+2' | Report | Chalmers 15'; Samuel 66' | Stadium: East End Park; Attendance: 5,246; Referee: Dan McFarlane |

| 28 February 2026 26 | Dunfermline Athletic | 1 – 0 | Queen's Park | Dunfermline, Scotland |
| 15:00 | Morrison 25' (pen.) | Report | | Stadium: East End Park; Attendance: 4,783; Referee: David Dickinson |

| 3 March 2026 27 | Dunfermline Athletic | 3 – 0 | Ross County | Dunfermline, Scotland |
| 19:45 | Morrison 15', 26'; Kane 80' | Report | | Stadium: East End Park; Attendance: 4,962; Referee: Chris Graham |

| 14 March 2026 28 | Dunfermline Athletic | 3 – 0 | Raith Rovers | Dunfermline, Scotland |
| 15:00 | Morrison 27'; Kane 90'; A.Tod 90+3' | Report | | Stadium: East End Park; Attendance: 6,605; Referee: Matthew MacDermid |

| 21 March 2026 29 | Ross County | 2 – 2 | Dunfermline Athletic | Dingwall, Scotland |
| 15:00 | Phillips 12', 16'; Mackie (red card) 90+3' | Report | Morrison 33'; A.Tod 69' | Stadium: Victoria Park; Attendance: 3,203; Referee: Grant Irvine |

| 4 April 2026 30 | Dunfermline Athletic | 3 – 1 | Greenock Morton | Dunfermline, Scotland |
| 15:00 | A.Tod 48'; Ngwenya 52'; M.Todd 66' | Report | Blues 36' | Stadium: East End Park; Attendance: 5,037; Referee: Colin Steven |

| 7 April 2026 31 | Ayr United | 0 – 3 | Dunfermline Athletic | Ayr, Scotland |
| 19:45 | | Report | Cooper 1'; Kane 55' (pen.); Bray 86' | Stadium: Somerset Park; Attendance: 2,033; Referee: Duncan Nicolson |

| 11 April 2026 32 | Partick Thistle | 2 – 0 | Dunfermline Athletic | Glasgow, Scotland |
| 15:00 | Samuel 18', 22' | Report | | Stadium: Firhill Stadium; Attendance: 4,017; Referee: Kevin Clancy |

| 14 April 2026 33 | Airdrieonians | 2 – 2 | Dunfermline Athletic | Airdrie, Scotland |
| 19:45 | Thomas 12'; Mochrie 48' | Report | Cooper 53'; Fyfe 85' | Stadium: Excelsior Stadium; Attendance: 1,620; Referee: Peter Stuart |

| 21 April 2026 34 | Dunfermline Athletic | 0 – 2 | St Johnstone | Dunfermline, Scotland |
| 19:45 | | Report | McAlear 56'; Paton 73' | Stadium: East End Park; Attendance: 7,691; Referee: Don Robertson |

| 25 April 2026 35 | Queen's Park | 0 – 2 | Dunfermline Athletic | Glasgow, Scotland |
| 15:00 | | Report | Chilokoa-Mullen 25'; Kane 46' | Stadium: Lesser Hampden; Attendance: 889; Referee: Ross Hardie |

| 1 May 2026 36 | Dunfermline Athletic | 0 – 0 | Arbroath | Dunfermline, Scotland |
| 19:45 | | Report | | Stadium: East End Park; Attendance: 5,065; Referee: Cameron Stirling |

=== Premiership play-offs ===
| 5 May 2026 Quarter-finals 1st leg | Dunfermline Athletic | 1 – 0 | Arbroath | Dunfermline, Scotland |
| 19:45 | Kane 7' | Report | | Stadium: East End Park; Attendance: 5,079; Referee: Ryan Lee |

| 8 May 2026 Quarter-finals 2nd leg | Arbroath | 0 – 0 (0 – 1 agg.) | Dunfermline Athletic | Arbroath, Scotland |
| 19:45 | | Report | | Stadium: Gayfield Park; Attendance: 3,689; Referee: David Dickinson |

| 12 May 2026 Semi-finals 1st leg | Dunfermline Athletic | 1 – 1 | Partick Thistle | Dunfermline, Scotland |
| 19:45 | Morrison 23' | Report | Stanway 24' | Stadium: East End Park; Attendance: 6,873; Referee: Duncan Nicolson |

| 15 May 2026 Semi-finals 2nd leg | Partick Thistle | 2 – 1 (3 – 2 agg.) | Dunfermline Athletic | Glasgow, Scotland |
| 19:45 | Chalmers 50'; Samuel 75' | Report | Gilmour 34' | Stadium: Firhill Stadium; Attendance: 8,044; Referee: Calum Scott |

=== Scottish League Cup ===
==== Group stage ====
| 12 July 2025 1 | Heart of Midlothian | 4 – 1 | Dunfermline Athletic | Edinburgh, Scotland |
| 17:15 | Wilson 3'; Shankland 76', 79'; Kingsley 90+1' | Report | Cooper 38' | Stadium: Tynecastle Park; Attendance: 12,940; Referee: Lloyd Wilson |

| 19 July 2025 2 | Dumbarton | 0 – 4 | Dunfermline Athletic | Dumbarton, Scotland |
| 15:00 | | Report | Cooper 14', 59'; Kane 45+1'; A.Tod 55' | Stadium: Dumbarton Football Stadium; Attendance: 1,026; Referee: George Calder |

| 22 July 2025 3 | Dunfermline Athletic | 2 – 1 | Hamilton Academical | Dunfermline, Scotland |
| 19:45 | A.Tod 39'; Kilday 70' (o.g.) | Report | Shaw 69' | Stadium: East End Park; Attendance: 2,582; Referee: Daniel Graves |

| 26 July 2025 4 | Dunfermline Athletic | 2 – 0 | Stirling Albion | Dunfermline, Scotland |
| 15:00 | A.Tod 75'; MacLeod 90+4' (pen.) | Report | | Stadium: East End Park; Attendance: 2,389; Referee: Graham Grainger |

=== Scottish Challenge Cup ===
| 16 December 2025 Second round | Queen of the South | 4 – 3 | Dunfermline Athletic | Dumfries, Scotland |
| 19:45 | Guthrie 6'; Scott 11'; O'Donoghue 74'; Dickenson 76' | Report | MacLeod 41'; Stewart 79', 83' | Stadium: Palmerston Park; Attendance: 484; Referee: Jamie Wilkie |
Note: Match postponed due to Storm Bram.

=== Scottish Cup ===
| 29 November 2025 Third round | Dunfermline Athletic | 2 – 1 | Queen of the South | Dunfermline, Scotland |
| 15:00 | Kane 7', 15' | Report | J.Tod 4' (o.g.) | Stadium: East End Park; Attendance: 2,127; Referee: Dan McFarlane |

| 17 January 2026 Fourth round | Dunfermline Athletic | 1 – 0 | Hibernian | Dunfermline, Scotland |
| 12:30 | Chaiwa 90+2' (o.g.) | Report | | Stadium: East End Park; Attendance: 10,350; Referee: Steven McLean |

| 7 February 2026 Fifth round | Dunfermline Athletic | 2 – 0 | Kelty Hearts | Dunfermline, Scotland |
| 15:00 | Kane 75', 87' | Report | | Stadium: East End Park; Attendance: 4,976; Referee: Lloyd Wilson |

| 7 March 2026 Quarter-finals | Dunfermline Athletic | 3 – 0 | Aberdeen | Dunfermline, Scotland |
| 19:30 | M.Todd 14'; Thomas 22', 61' | Report | | Stadium: East End Park; Attendance: 10,399; Referee: Ryan Lee |

| 18 April 2026 Semi-finals | Dunfermline Athletic | 0 – 0 (4 – 2 p) | Falkirk | Glasgow, Scotland |
| 12:30 | | Report | Cartwright (red card) 120+1' | Stadium: Hampden Park; Attendance: 25,237; Referee: John Beaton |

| 23 May 2026 Final | Celtic | 3 – 1 | Dunfermline Athletic | Glasgow, Scotland |
| 15:00 | Maeda 19'; Engels 36'; Iheanacho 73' | Report | Cooper 80' | Stadium: Hampden Park; Attendance: 49,613; Referee: Steven McLean |

== Squad statistics ==
=== Appearances and goals ===
As of match played 23 May 2026

| No. | Pos | Nat | Player | Total | | Championship + playoffs | | League Cup | | Challenge Cup | | Scottish Cup | |
| No. | Pos | Nat | Player | Apps | Goals | Apps | Goals | Apps | Goals | Apps | Goals | Apps | Goals |
|---|---|---|---|---|---|---|---|---|---|---|---|---|---|
| 1 | GK | (Turkey) TUR | Deniz Mehmet | 12 | 0 | 5+1 | 0 | 4 | 0 | 1 | 0 | 1 | 0 |
| 2 | DF | (Scotland) SCO | Jeremiah Chilokoa-Mullen | 44 | 2 | 34 | 2 | 4 | 0 | 0 | 0 | 6 | 0 |
| 3 | DF | (Trinidad and Tobago) TRI | Kieran Ngwenya | 27 | 4 | 19 | 4 | 0+2 | 0 | 1 | 0 | 5 | 0 |
| 4 | DF | (Scotland) SCO | Kyle Benedictus | 23 | 0 | 11+6 | 0 | 4 | 0 | 1 | 0 | 0+1 | 0 |
| 5 | MF | (Scotland) SCO | Chris Hamilton | 32 | 0 | 15+9 | 0 | 0+3 | 0 | 1 | 0 | 1+3 | 0 |
| 6 | DF | (Scotland) SCO | Ewan Otoo | 16 | 0 | 6+4 | 0 | 4 | 0 | 1 | 0 | 0+1 | 0 |
| 8 | MF | (Scotland) SCO | Charlie Gilmour | 46 | 3 | 32+3 | 3 | 4 | 0 | 1 | 0 | 5+1 | 0 |
| 9 | FW | (Scotland) SCO | Zak Rudden | 12 | 2 | 7+1 | 2 | 0 | 0 | 1 | 0 | 2+1 | 0 |
| 10 | MF | (Scotland) SCO | Matty Todd | 43 | 3 | 27+7 | 2 | 0+2 | 0 | 0+1 | 0 | 6 | 1 |
| 11 | DF | (Northern Ireland) NIR | Shea Kearney | 39 | 0 | 19+11 | 0 | 2+2 | 0 | 0 | 0 | 0+5 | 0 |
| 13 | GK | (England) ENG | Aston Oxborough | 15 | 0 | 12 | 0 | 0 | 0 | 0 | 0 | 3 | 0 |
| 14 | MF | (Mozambique) MOZ | Alfons Amade | 40 | 0 | 20+12 | 0 | 2+1 | 0 | 0 | 0 | 3+2 | 0 |
| 16 | FW | (Scotland) SCO | Rory MacLeod | 18 | 3 | 9+6 | 1 | 0+2 | 1 | 1 | 1 | 0 | 0 |
| 18 | DF | (Ghana) GHA | Nurudeen Abdulai | 31 | 1 | 24+2 | 1 | 0 | 0 | 0 | 0 | 5 | 0 |
| 19 | FW | (England) ENG | Olly Thomas | 10 | 2 | 5+3 | 0 | 0 | 0 | 0 | 0 | 2 | 2 |
| 20 | FW | (Scotland) SCO | Chris Kane | 38 | 12 | 11+19 | 7 | 3 | 1 | 0 | 0 | 3+2 | 4 |
| 22 | DF | (Scotland) SCO | Keith Bray | 22 | 1 | 9+9 | 1 | 0+2 | 0 | 1 | 0 | 1 | 0 |
| 23 | DF | (Scotland) SCO | Alasdair Davidson | 2 | 0 | 2 | 0 | 0 | 0 | 0 | 0 | 0 | 0 |
| 24 | MF | (Republic of Ireland) IRL | Graham Carey | 2 | 0 | 0+1 | 0 | 0 | 0 | 0 | 0 | 1 | 0 |
| 26 | MF | (Scotland) SCO | Andrew Tod | 45 | 16 | 33+3 | 13 | 2+1 | 3 | 0 | 0 | 5+1 | 0 |
| 27 | DF | (Scotland) SCO | Liam Hoggan | 0 | 0 | 0 | 0 | 0 | 0 | 0 | 0 | 0 | 0 |
| 28 | MF | (Scotland) SCO | Ewan McLeod | 2 | 0 | 2 | 0 | 0 | 0 | 0 | 0 | 0 | 0 |
| 31 | DF | (Scotland) SCO | John Tod | 25 | 1 | 17+2 | 1 | 4 | 0 | 0 | 0 | 2 | 0 |
| 33 | MF | (Scotland) SCO | Josh Cooper | 33 | 7 | 11+13 | 3 | 4 | 3 | 1 | 0 | 0+4 | 1 |
| 34 | MF | (Scotland) SCO | Lucas Fyfe | 13 | 1 | 2+8 | 1 | 1 | 0 | 0+1 | 0 | 0+1 | 0 |
| 35 | MF | (England) ENG | Tashan Oakley-Boothe | 34 | 0 | 9+15 | 0 | 3+1 | 0 | 0+1 | 0 | 3+2 | 0 |
| 38 | MF | (Scotland) SCO | Callumn Morrison | 20 | 6 | 15+1 | 6 | 0 | 0 | 0 | 0 | 3+1 | 0 |
| 39 | DF | (Republic of Ireland) IRL | Freddie Turley | 10 | 0 | 6+3 | 0 | 0 | 0 | 0 | 0 | 1 | 0 |
| 40 | GK | (England) ENG | Billy Terrell | 18 | 0 | 16 | 0 | 0 | 0 | 0 | 0 | 2 | 0 |
| 42 | MF | (Scotland) SCO | Christopher McDowell | 1 | 0 | 0+1 | 0 | 0 | 0 | 0 | 0 | 0 | 0 |
| 43 | FW | (Scotland) SCO | Jay Haughey | 1 | 0 | 0+1 | 0 | 0 | 0 | 0 | 0 | 0 | 0 |
| 44 | FW | (Scotland) SCO | Jack Quinn | 1 | 0 | 0+1 | 0 | 0 | 0 | 0 | 0 | 0 | 0 |
| 47 | DF | (Scotland) SCO | Robbie Fraser | 41 | 1 | 33+2 | 1 | 0 | 0 | 0 | 0 | 6 | 0 |
Players who left during the season:
| 7 | MF | (England) ENG | Kane Ritchie-Hosler | 21 | 0 | 3+12 | 0 | 2+2 | 0 | 1 | 0 | 0+1 | 0 |
| 12 | MF | (Peru) PER | Jefferson Cáceres | 14 | 0 | 9+4 | 0 | 0 | 0 | 0 | 0 | 0+1 | 0 |
| 15 | DF | (Scotland) SCO | Sam Fisher | 1 | 0 | 0+1 | 0 | 0 | 0 | 0 | 0 | 0 | 0 |
| 17 | FW | (Scotland) SCO | Connor Young | 6 | 0 | 3+1 | 0 | 1+1 | 0 | 0 | 0 | 0 | 0 |
| 19 | FW | (England) ENG | Barney Stewart | 12 | 7 | 7+4 | 5 | 0 | 0 | 0+1 | 2 | 0 | 0 |
| 24 | FW | (Scotland) SCO | Taylor Sutherland | 0 | 0 | 0 | 0 | 0 | 0 | 0 | 0 | 0 | 0 |
| 25 | MF | (Scotland) SCO | Sam Young | 0 | 0 | 0 | 0 | 0 | 0 | 0 | 0 | 0 | 0 |
| 29 | FW | (Scotland) SCO | Jake Sutherland | 0 | 0 | 0 | 0 | 0 | 0 | 0 | 0 | 0 | 0 |
| 30 | MF | (Scotland) SCO | Freddie Rowe | 0 | 0 | 0 | 0 | 0 | 0 | 0 | 0 | 0 | 0 |
| 32 | FW | (Scotland) SCO | Mark Beveridge | 0 | 0 | 0 | 0 | 0 | 0 | 0 | 0 | 0 | 0 |
| 36 | GK | (Scotland) SCO | Thomas Margetts | 0 | 0 | 0 | 0 | 0 | 0 | 0 | 0 | 0 | 0 |
| 37 | MF | (Scotland) SCO | Danny Dobbie | 0 | 0 | 0 | 0 | 0 | 0 | 0 | 0 | 0 | 0 |
| 54 | GK | (Northern Ireland) NIR | Mason Munn | 8 | 0 | 7+1 | 0 | 0 | 0 | 0 | 0 | 0 | 0 |

=== Goalscorers ===
As of match played 23 May 2026

| Ranking | Position | Nation | Name | Total | Scottish Championship + playoffs | Scottish League Cup | Scottish Challenge Cup | Scottish Cup |
|---|---|---|---|---|---|---|---|---|
| 1 | MF | (Scotland) | Andrew Tod | 16 | 13 | 3 | | |
| 2 | FW | (Scotland) | Chris Kane | 12 | 7 | 1 | | 4 |
| 3 | MF | (Scotland) | Josh Cooper | 7 | 3 | 3 | | 1 |
| 3 | FW | (England) | Barney Stewart | 7 | 5 | | 2 | |
| 4 | MF | (Scotland) | Callumn Morrison | 6 | 6 | | | |
| 5 | FW | (Scotland) | Rory MacLeod | 4 | 2 | 1 | 1 | |
| 5 | DF | (Trinidad and Tobago) | Kieran Ngwenya | 4 | 4 | | | |
| 6 | MF | (Scotland) | Charlie Gilmour | 3 | 3 | | | |
| 6 | MF | (Scotland) | Matty Todd | 3 | 2 | | | 1 |
| 7 | DF | (Scotland) | Jeremiah Chilokoa-Mullen | 2 | 2 | | | |
| 7 | FW | (Scotland) | Zak Rudden | 2 | 2 | | | |
| 7 | FW | (England) | Olly Thomas | 2 | | | | 2 |
| 8 | DF | (Ghana) | Nurudeen Abdulai | 1 | 1 | | | |
| 8 | DF | (Scotland) | Keith Bray | 1 | 1 | | | |
| 8 | MF | (Scotland) | Lucas Fyfe | 1 | 1 | | | |
| 8 | DF | (Scotland) | Robbie Fraser | 1 | 1 | | | |
| 8 | DF | (Scotland) | John Tod | 1 | 1 | | | |
| Total | | | | 72 | 53 | 8 | 3 | 8 |

=== Disciplinary record ===
As of match played 23 May 2026

| Squad number | Position | Nation | Name | Total | | Scottish Championship + playoffs | | Scottish League Cup | | Scottish Challenge Cup | | Scottish Cup | |
| Squad number | Position | Nation | Name | Booked | Sent off (straight red) | Booked | Sent off (straight red) | Booked | Sent off (straight red) | Booked | Sent off (straight red) | Booked | Sent off (straight red) |
|---|---|---|---|---|---|---|---|---|---|---|---|---|---|
| 1 | GK | (Turkey) | Deniz Mehmet | 2 | | 1 | | 1 | | | | | |
| 2 | DF | (Scotland) | Jeremiah Chilokoa-Mullen | 7 | 1 | 7 | 1 | | | | | | |
| 3 | DF | (Trinidad and Tobago) | Kieran Ngwenya | 5 | 1 | 5 | 1 | | | | | 1 | |
| 4 | DF | (Scotland) | Kyle Benedictus | 2 | | 3 | | | | | | | |
| 5 | MF | (Scotland) | Chris Hamilton | 5 | 1 | 4 | 1 | | | 1 | | | |
| 8 | MF | (Scotland) | Charlie Gilmour | 11 | | 9 | | 1 | | | | 2 | |
| 9 | FW | (Scotland) | Zak Rudden | 3 | | 3 | | | | | | | |
| 11 | DF | (Northern Ireland) | Shea Kearney | 3 | | 2 | | 1 | | | | | |
| 12 | MF | (Peru) | Jefferson Cáceres | 1 | 1 | 1 | 1 | | | | | | |
| 13 | GK | (England) | Aston Oxborough | 1 | | 1 | | | | | | | |
| 14 | MF | (Mozambique) | Alfons Amade | 3 | | 3 | | | | | | | |
| 16 | FW | (Scotland) | Rory MacLeod | 3 | | 3 | | | | | | | |
| 17 | FW | (Scotland) | Connor Young | 1 | | 1 | | | | | | | |
| 18 | DF | (Ghana) | Nurudeen Abdulai | 2 | | 2 | | | | | | 1 | |
| 19 | FW | (England) | Olly Thomas | 1 | | 1 | | | | | | | |
| 20 | FW | (Scotland) | Chris Kane | 1 | | | | | | | | 1 | |
| 22 | DF | (Scotland) | Keith Bray | 1 | | | | | | | | 1 | |
| 24 | MF | (Republic of Ireland) | Graham Carey | 1 | | | | | | | | 1 | |
| 26 | MF | (Scotland) | Andrew Tod | 2 | | 2 | | | | | | 1 | |
| 31 | DF | (Scotland) | John Tod | 5 | | 5 | | | | | | | |
| 33 | MF | (Scotland) | Josh Cooper | 1 | | | | 1 | | | | | |
| 35 | MF | (England) | Tashan Oakley-Boothe | 2 | | 2 | | | | | | 1 | |
| 38 | MF | (Scotland) | Callumn Morrison | 3 | | 2 | | | | | | 1 | |
| 39 | MF | (Republic of Ireland) | Freddie Turley | 2 | | 2 | | | | | | | |
| 40 | GK | (England) | Billy Terrell | 1 | | 1 | | | | | | | |
| 47 | DF | (Scotland) | Robbie Fraser | 4 | | 4 | | | | | | | |
| Total | | | | 79 | 4 | 64 | 4 | 4 | 0 | 1 | 0 | 10 | 0 |

== Club statistics ==
=== League table ===
| Pos | Team | Pld | W | D | L | GF | GA | GD | Pts | Promotion, qualification or relegation |
|---|---|---|---|---|---|---|---|---|---|---|
| 2 | Partick Thistle | 36 | 17 | 15 | 4 | 53 | 36 | +17 | 66 | Qualification for the Premiership play-off semi-final |
| 3 | Arbroath | 36 | 13 | 13 | 10 | 43 | 41 | +2 | 52 | Qualification for the Premiership play-off quarter-final |
| 4 | Dunfermline Athletic | 36 | 14 | 9 | 13 | 52 | 41 | +11 | 51 | Qualification for the Premiership play-off quarter-final |
| 5 | Raith Rovers | 36 | 12 | 9 | 15 | 43 | 42 | +1 | 45 | |
| 6 | Queen's Park | 36 | 9 | 14 | 13 | 35 | 48 | −13 | 41 | |

Rules for classification: 1) Points; 2) Goal difference; 3) Goals scored; 4) Head-to head points; 5) Head-to-head goal difference; 6) Play-off (only for deciding promotion, play-off participation and relegation).

=== League cup table ===
| Pos | Team | Pld | W | PW | PL | L | GF | GA | GD | Pts | Qualification | HOM | DNF | DUM | HAM | STI |
|---|---|---|---|---|---|---|---|---|---|---|---|---|---|---|---|---|
| 1 | Heart of Midlothian | 4 | 4 | 0 | 0 | 0 | 16 | 1 | +15 | 12 | Qualification for the second round | — | 4–1 | 4–0 | — | — |
| 2 | Dunfermline Athletic | 4 | 3 | 0 | 0 | 1 | 9 | 5 | +4 | 9 | | — | — | — | 2–1 | 2–0 |
| 3 | Dumbarton | 4 | 2 | 0 | 0 | 2 | 2 | 8 | −6 | 6 | | — | 0–4 | — | — | 1–0 |
| 4 | Hamilton Academical | 4 | 1 | 0 | 0 | 3 | 3 | 7 | −4 | 3 | | 0–4 | — | 0–1 | — | — |
| 5 | Stirling Albion | 4 | 0 | 0 | 0 | 4 | 0 | 9 | −9 | 0 | | 0–4 | — | — | 0–2 | — |

Rules for classification: 1) goal difference, 2) goals scored, 3) away goals scored, 4) matches won, 5) away matches won, 6) drawing of lots.

== Transfers ==
=== Players in ===
| Date | Position | No. | Nationality | Name | From | Fee | Ref. |
|---|---|---|---|---|---|---|---|
| 2 June 2025 | MF | 8 | (Scotland) | Charlie Gilmour | Inverness CT | Free | |
| 16 June 2025 | FW | | (Scotland) | Zeke Cameron | Dundee United | Free | |
| 4 July 2025 | MF | 14 | (Mozambique) | Alfons Amade | Septemvri Sofia | Free | |
| 11 July 2025 | FW | 16 | (Scotland) | Rory MacLeod | Dundee United | Undisclosed | |
| 11 July 2025 | DF | 23 | (Scotland) | Alasdair Davidson | Celtic | Free | |
| 11 July 2025 | DF | 11 | (Northern Ireland) | Shea Kearney | Cliftonville | Undisclosed | |
| 11 July 2025 | MF | 37 | (Scotland) | Danny Dobbie | Livingston | Free | |
| 1 August 2025 | GK | 40 | (England) | Billy Terrell | Bournemouth | Free | |
| 15 August 2025 | DF | 47 | (Scotland) | Robbie Fraser | Rangers | Undisclosed | |
| 15 August 2025 | MF | 12 | (Peru) | Jefferson Cáceres | Sheffield United | Undisclosed | |
| 28 August 2025 | FW | 9 | (Scotland) | Zak Rudden | Livingston | Undisclosed | |
| 1 September 2025 | DF | 18 | (Ghana) | Nurudeen Abdulai | Medeama SC | Undisclosed | |
| 16 January 2026 | MF | 38 | (Scotland) | Callumn Morrison | Linfield | Undisclosed | |

=== Players out ===
| Date | Position | No. | Nationality | Name | To | Fee | Ref. |
|---|---|---|---|---|---|---|---|
| 7 May 2025 | DF | 12 | (Scotland) | Rhys Breen | East Kilbride | Free | |
| 7 May 2025 | MF | 8 | (Scotland) | Joe Chalmers | Inverness CT | Free | |
| 7 May 2025 | MF | 22 | (England) | Craig Clay | Kelty Hearts | Free | |
| 7 May 2025 | DF | 2 | (Scotland) | Aaron Comrie | Greenock Morton | Free | |
| 7 May 2025 | MF | 44 | (Kenya) | Victor Wanyama | | Free | |
| 7 May 2025 | FW | 23 | (Scotland) | Michael O'Halloran | Greenock Morton | Free | |
| 7 May 2025 | MF | 45 | (Wales) | Omar Taylor-Clarke | | Free | |
| 7 May 2025 | FW | 9 | (Scotland) | Craig Wighton | Montrose | Free | |
| 7 May 2025 | MF | 19 | (Canada) | David Wotherspoon | Inverness CT | Free | |
| 12 June 2025 | FW | 11 | (Northern Ireland) | Lewis McCann | Fleetwood Town | Free | |
| 12 June 2025 | FW | 62 | (Scotland) | Dapo Mebude | Arbroath | Free | |
| 20 January 2026 | FW | 24 | (Scotland) | Taylor Sutherland | Montrose | Free | |
| 22 February 2026 | MF | 12 | (Peru) | Jefferson Cáceres | FBC Melgar | Undisclosed | |

=== Loans in ===
| Date | Position | No. | Nationality | Name | From | Duration | Ref. |
|---|---|---|---|---|---|---|---|
| 26 July 2025 | GK | 54 | (Northern Ireland) | Mason Munn | Rangers | 1 January 2026 | |
| 26 September 2025 | FW | 19 | (England) | Barney Stewart | Falkirk | 1 January 2026 | |
| 7 January 2026 | FW | 19 | (England) | Olly Thomas | Bristol City | 31 May 2026 | |
| 29 January 2026 | MF | 24 | (Republic of Ireland) | Graham Carey | Livingston | 31 May 2026 | |
| 1 February 2026 | DF | 39 | (Republic of Ireland) | Freddie Turley | Derby County | 31 May 2026 | |
| 24 February 2026 | GK | 13 | (England) | Aston Oxborough | Motherwell | 31 May 2026 | |

=== Loans out ===
| Date | Position | No. | Nationality | Name | To | Duration | Ref. |
|---|---|---|---|---|---|---|---|
| 31 July 2025 | MF | 28 | (Scotland) | Ewan McLeod | East Fife | 31 May 2026 | |
| 1 August 2025 | FW | 24 | (Scotland) | Taylor Sutherland | Clyde | 1 January 2026 | |
| 5 August 2025 | FW | 29 | (Scotland) | Jake Sutherland | Forfar Athletic | 31 May 2026 | |
| 6 September 2025 | FW | | (Scotland) | Zeke Cameron | Stenhousemuir | 31 May 2026 | |
| 6 September 2025 | FW | 32 | (Scotland) | Mark Beveridge | Glenrothes | 31 May 2026 | |
| 3 October 2025 | FW | 17 | (Scotland) | Connor Young | East Kilbride | 31 May 2026 | |
| 3 October 2025 | DF | 23 | (Scotland) | Alasdair Davidson | Bo'ness United | 31 May 2026 | |
| 3 October 2025 | DF | 25 | (Scotland) | Sam Young | Tranent | 31 January 2026 | |
| 12 October 2025 | MF | 37 | (Scotland) | Danny Dobbie | Bonnyrigg Rose | 31 May 2026 | |
| 14 November 2025 | GK | 36 | (Scotland) | Thomas Margetts | Kelty Hearts | 31 May 2026 | |
| 4 January 2026 | MF | 30 | (Scotland) | Freddie Rowe | East Fife | 31 May 2026 | |
| 7 January 2026 | DF | 15 | (Scotland) | Sam Fisher | Kelty Hearts | 31 May 2026 | |
| 9 January 2026 | MF | 25 | (Scotland) | Sam Young | East Kilbride | 31 May 2026 | |
| 10 February 2026 | MF | 7 | (England) | Kane Ritchie-Hosler | Stenhousemuir | 31 May 2026 | |
