= Deniz Mehmet =

English footballer

Personal information
- Full name: Deniz Doğan Mehmet
- Date of birth: 19 September 1992 (age 34)
- Place of birth: Enfield, London, England
- Height: 1.92 m (6 ft 4 in)
- Position: Goalkeeper

Team information
- Current team: Queen of the South

Youth career
- Arsenal
- Charlton Athletic
- 2007–2008: Manchester United
- 2008–2011: West Ham United

Senior career*
Years	Team	Apps	(Gls)
2011	Welling United	0	(0)
2011–2015	Kayserispor	0	(0)
2016–2017	Falkirk	2	(0)
2017	Port Vale	9	(0)
2017–2019	Dundee United	6	(0)
2019	Queen of the South	2	(0)
2019–2021	Dundee United	4	(0)
2021–2026	Dunfermline Athletic	83	(0)
2026–	Queen of the South	0	(0)

International career
2007	Turkey U16	1	(0)
2008–2009	Turkey U17	17	(0)
2009–2010	Turkey U18	3	(0)
2010	Turkey U19	2	(0)
- * Club domestic league appearances and goals as of 27 July 2026

Deniz Doğan Mehmet (born 19 September 1992) is a professional footballer who plays as a goalkeeper for Scottish League One club Queen of the South.

A former youth team player at Arsenal, Charlton Athletic, Manchester United, and West Ham United, Mehmet then signed for Welling United for a brief spell in 2011. Having represented Turkey up to under-19 level, English-born Mehmet then spent four years in Turkey as a reserve team goalkeeper at Kayserispor. Mehmet then signed for Scottish club Falkirk in January 2016, where he stayed for one year. Mehmet then returned to England to sign for Port Vale in March 2017 before signing for Dundee United later that same year. He joined Queen of the South in March 2019 before returning to Dundee United four months later. He sat on the bench as United won the Scottish Championship in the 2019–20 season. He joined Dunfermline Athletic in June 2021 and kept goal as the club won the Scottish League One title at the end of the 2022–23 season, earning himself a place in the PFA Scotland Team of the Year. He joined Queen of the South in July 2026.

== Early life ==
Mehmet was born in Enfield, London, on 19 September 1992 and he is of Turkish Cypriot descent.

== Club career ==
=== Journeyman back-up goalkeeper ===
Mehmet was associated with the youth academies at Arsenal, Charlton Athletic, and Manchester United, before he joined the youth academy at West Ham United in 2008. Mehmet departed West Ham in the 2011 close season and had trials with Ipswich Town and Wycombe Wanderers that summer. He then signed for Welling United of the Conference South. Mehmet departed Welling to sign for Turkish Süper Lig club Kayserispor. He departed the Turkish club in January 2015, having played ten cup matches in four seasons.

Mehmet then had trials with Luton Town and Leyton Orient in the 2015 close season and then went on to have a trial with Plymouth Argyle in October 2015 and featured for the club in the Under-21 Premier League Cup. He then signed for Scottish Championship club Falkirk in January 2016 after a one-month trial. Mehmet was unable to replace first-choice goalkeeper Danny Rogers and departed the club by mutual consent in January 2017, after informing manager Peter Houston that he wanted to play regular matches elsewhere.

Mehmet then signed a short-term contract with EFL League One club Port Vale on 1 March 2017, intending to be the back-up to on loan goalkeeper Leo Fasan. Mehmet debuted for Port Vale in a crucial 2–1 win versus relegation rivals Shrewsbury Town at Vale Park on 17 March 2017. One week later, he impressed in a 0–0 home draw versus Milton Keynes Dons, which was the club's first clean sheet in 14 matches. Mehmet was released by manager Michael Brown, following the club's relegation in May 2017.

Mehmet signed a one-year contract with Scottish Championship side Dundee United after impressing after a trial in July 2017. He was restricted to cup appearances in the first part of the 2017–18 season, despite expecting a better opportunity when Csaba László replaced Ray McKinnon as manager in November 2017, although he explained that the change in management had little effect on him as he spent most of his time at Tannadice with goalkeeping coach Stuart Garden. Mehmet eventually staked his claim as first-team goalkeeper towards the end of that season, as United defeated Dunfermline Athletic in the play-off quarter-finals but had to be substituted for Harry Lewis just under an hour into the second leg, after he injured himself celebrating Scott McDonald's equalising goal. Manager Laszlo stated that "this was the funniest thing he had seen in football and was really stupid". Mehmet signed a new one-year contract with Dundee United in May 2018, however, the tore cruciate ligament injury he sustained in the play-offs left him unable to feature during the first half of the 2018–19 season. Manager Robbie Neilson gave him a six-month contract extension to help him through his rehabilitation.

On 29 March 2019, Mehmet signed for Queen of the South until the end of the 2018–19 season and manager Gary Naysmith explained that he signed him after first-team goalkeeper Martin and third-choice goalkeeper Ryan Gibson both picked up injuries. He rejoined Dundee United on 5 July 2019 signing a two-year contract; sporting director Tony Asghar explained that he was allowed to leave the club in order to prove his fitness, and having done so he was re-signed to provide competition for first-choice goalkeeper Benjamin Siegrist. However, Siegrist played all 28 league games in the 2019–20 season as United were declared as league champions with eight games left to play due to the COVID-19 pandemic in Scotland. Mehmet made four league and eight cup appearances throughout the 2020–21 campaign, including playing in a Scottish Cup semi-final defeat to Hibernian. However, he decided to leave Tannadice after concluding that "it just wasn't happening for me at Dundee United" with manager Micky Mellon settled on playing Siegrist in goal.

=== Dunfermline Athletic ===
On 23 June 2021, Mehmet signed for Scottish Championship side Dunfermline Athletic on a two-year deal, arriving as Peter Grant second signing of the summer. Veteran goalkeeper Owain Fôn Williams left East End Park in February, though Jakub Stolarczyk was selected as his replacement as Mehmet was out with a finger injury. Manager John Hughes praised Mehmet for his performances filling in whilst Stolarczyk was away on international duty. He featured eight times in the 2021–22 relegation campaign.

Following Dunfermline's relegation, Mehmet became the first-choice goalkeeper for the 2022–23 season, appearing 44 times and breaking the club record for clean sheets. Mehmet was selected in League One's PFA Scotland Team of the Year as Dunfermline secured promotion as champions. When asked for his thoughts on fans chanting his name, he commented on the contrasting fortunes with the previous campaign, saying "I think, if you had told them a year down the line they'd be doing that, they'd have told you you're mad. I would have anyway!" On 3 May 2024, Mehmet was injured during a 3–3 draw at Ayr United and suffered from dizziness. Manager James McPake described it as a "pretty scary" incident but confirmed that Mehmet was recovering after being given the all clear at the hospital. He was a backup to Tobi Oluwayemi in the 2024–25 campaign.

With Oluwayemi no longer at the club, Mehmet aimed to become Dunfermline's first-choice goalkeeper again. Neil Lennon brought in two new goalkeepers, however, in Rangers loanee Mason Munn and permanent signing Billy Terrell. Aston Oxborough also arrived on loan in the January transfer window. Mehmet played 12 games in the 2025–26 campaign, and was released upon the expiry of his contract.

=== Return to Queen of the South ===
He appeared as a trialist for former club Queen of the South in July 2026. On 26 July, signed a one-year deal with the club.

== International career ==
Mehmet has been capped by Turkey at under-16, under-17, under-18, and under-19 level. He was selected by Abdullah Ercan as a squad member for the 2009 UEFA European Under-17 Championship in Germany and the 2009 FIFA U-17 World Cup in Nigeria.

== Career statistics ==
As of match played 1 May 2026

Appearances and goals by club, season and competition
Club	Season	League			National cup (Note: Includes Turkish Cup, Scottish Cup)		League cup (Note: Includes Spor Toto Cup, Scottish League Cup)		Other		Total	
Club	Season	Division	Apps	Goals	Apps	Goals	Apps	Goals	Apps	Goals	Apps	Goals
Welling United	2011–12	Conference South	0	0	0	0	—		0	0	0	0
Kayserispor	2011–12	Süper Lig	0	0	0	0	6	0	—		6	0
Kayserispor	2012–13	Süper Lig	0	0	0	0	—		0	0	0	0
Kayserispor	2013–14	Süper Lig	0	0	0	0	—		0	0	0	0
Kayserispor	2014–15	TFF First League	0	0	4	0	—		0	0	4	0
Kayserispor	Total		0	0	4	0	6	0	0	0	10	0
Falkirk	2015–16	Scottish Championship	1	0	0	0	0	0	0	0	1	0
Falkirk	2016–17	Scottish Championship	1	0	0	0	1	0	2 (Note: Appearances in Scottish Challenge Cup)	0	4	0
Falkirk	Total		2	0	0	0	1	0	2	0	5	0
Port Vale	2016–17	EFL League One	9	0	—		—		—		9	0
Dundee United	2017–18	Scottish Championship	6	0	0	0	1	0	6 (Note: Four appearances in Scottish Challenge Cup, two in Scottish Premiership play-offs)	0	13	0
Dundee United	2018–19	Scottish Championship	0	0	0	0	0	0	0	0	0	0
Dundee United	Total		6	0	0	0	1	0	6	0	13	0
Queen of the South	2018–19	Scottish Championship	2	0	—		—		0	0	2	0
Dundee United	2019–20	Scottish Championship	0	0	0	0	1	0	1	0	2	0
Dundee United	2020–21	Scottish Premiership	4	0	4	0	4	0	—		12	0
Dundee United	Total		4	0	4	0	5	0	1	0	14	0
Dunfermline Athletic	2021–22	Scottish Championship	5	0	0	0	3	0	0	0	8	0
Dunfermline Athletic	2022–23	Scottish League One	36	0	2	0	4	0	2	0	44	0
Dunfermline Athletic	2023–24	Scottish Championship	29	0	1	0	4	0	0	0	34	0
Dunfermline Athletic	2024–25	Scottish Championship	7	0	0	0	4	0	1	0	12	0
Dunfermline Athletic	2025–26	Scottish Championship	6	0	1	0	4	0	1	0	12	0
Dunfermline Athletic	Total		83	0	4	0	19	0	4	0	110	0
Queen of the South	2026–27	Scottish League One	0	0	0	0	0	0	0	0	0	0
Career total			106	0	12	0	32	0	13	0	163	0

== Honours ==
Kayserispor

- TFF First League: 2014–15

Dundee United

- Scottish Championship: 2019–20

Dunfermline Athletic

- Scottish League One: 2022–23

Individual

- PFA Scotland Team of the Year (Scottish League One): 2022–23
