= List of Scottish football transfers summer 2026 =

This is a list of Scottish football transfers, featuring at least one 2026–27 Scottish Premiership club or one 2026–27 Scottish Championship club, which were completed during the summer 2026 transfer window. The window closed on 3 September.

== List ==
Date	Name	Moving from	Moving to	Fee
4 May 2026	George Oakley	Ayr United	Raith Rovers	Free
5 May 2026	Curtis Main	Ayr United	Free agent	Free
8 May 2026	Shaun Byrne	Raith Rovers	Montrose	Free
11 May 2026	Josh Mullin	Raith Rovers	Stirling Albion	Free
14 May 2026	Tyrese Sinclair	York City	Livingston	Free
17 May 2026	Sam Nicholson	Motherwell	Livingston	Free
19 May 2026	Joel Nouble	Livingston	Free agent	Free
19 May 2026	Barrie McKay	Livingston	Free agent	Free
19 May 2026	Jeremy Bokila	Livingston	Free agent	Free
19 May 2026	Andrew Shinnie	Livingston	Free agent	Free
19 May 2026	Jamie Smith	Livingston	Free agent	Free
19 May 2026	Samson Lawal	Livingston	Free agent	Free
19 May 2026	Graham Carey	Livingston	Free agent	Free
19 May 2026	Andy Winter	Livingston	Free agent	Free
19 May 2026	Lewis Latona	Livingston	Free agent	Free
19 May 2026	Danny Wilson	Livingston	Free agent	Free
19 May 2026	Mohamed Sylla	Livingston	Free agent	Free
20 May 2026	Daniel Finlayson	Livingston	St Johnstone	Free
20 May 2026	Craig Sibbald	Dundee United	Falkirk	Free
20 May 2026	Johnny Russell	Dundee United	Free agent	Free
20 May 2026	Kristijan Trapanovski	Dundee United	Free agent	Free
20 May 2026	Callum Slattery	Motherwell	Free agent	Free
20 May 2026	Zach Robinson	Motherwell	Free agent	Free
20 May 2026	Andy Halliday	Motherwell	Retired	Free
21 May 2026	Liam Polworth	Kilmarnock	Livingston	Free
22 May 2026	Cammy Palmer	Glentoran	Livingston	Free
22 May 2026	Sean Mackie	Falkirk	Free agent	Free
22 May 2026	Jack Walton	Preston North End	Dundee United	Free
25 May 2026	Jordan Doherty	Raith Rovers	Livingston	Free
25 May 2026	Oscar MacIntyre	Inverness Caledonian Thistle	Free agent	Free
25 May 2026	Jake Davidson	Inverness Caledonian Thistle	Free agent	Free
25 May 2026	Chanka Zimba	Inverness Caledonian Thistle	Free agent	Free
25 May 2026	Vicente Besuijen	Aberdeen	Free agent	Free
25 May 2026	Tom McIntyre	Aberdeen	Free agent	Free
25 May 2026	Elvis Bwomono	Aberdeen	Free agent	Free
25 May 2026	Ali Crawford	Greenock Morton	Free agent	Free
25 May 2026	Nathan Shaw	Greenock Morton	Free agent	Free
26 May 2026	Graeme Shinnie	Aberdeen	Inverness Caledonian Thistle	Free
26 May 2026	Élie Youan	Hibernian	Wisla Krakow	Free
26 May 2026	Brian Graham	Falkirk	Ross County	Free
26 May 2026	Robby McCrorie	Kilmarnock	Free agent	Free
26 May 2026	Matty Kennedy	Kilmarnock	Free agent	Free
26 May 2026	Kyle Magennis	Kilmarnock	Free agent	Free
26 May 2026	Bruce Anderson	Kilmarnock	Free agent	Free
26 May 2026	Marley Watkins	Kilmarnock	Free agent	Free
26 May 2026	Liam Polworth	Kilmarnock	Free agent	Free
27 May 2026	Kasper Schmeichel	Celtic	Retired	Free
27 May 2026	Beni Baningime	Heart of Midlothian	Free agent	Free
27 May 2026	Frankie Kent	Heart of Midlothian	Free agent	Free
27 May 2026	Fran Franczak	St Johnstone	Free agent	Free
27 May 2026	Jonathan Svedberg	St Johnstone	Free agent	Free
27 May 2026	Josh McPake	St Johnstone	Heart of Midlothian	Free
27 May 2026	Reghan Tumilty	St Johnstone	Free agent	Free
27 May 2026	Stevie Mallan	St Johnstone	Free agent	Free
27 May 2026	Tashan Oakley-Boothe	Dunfermline Athletic	Free agent	Free
27 May 2026	Kane Ritchie-Hosler	Dunfermline Athletic	Free agent	Free
28 May 2026	Jack McMillan	Exeter City	Falkirk	Free
29 May 2026	Paul McGovern	Glenavon	Falkirk	Undisclosed
29 May 2026	Scott Martin	Partick Thistle	Queen's Park	Free
29 May 2026	Josh Clarke	Celtic	Partick Thistle	Free
29 May 2026	Ben McPherson	Celtic	Partick Thistle	Free
29 May 2026	Robbie Thompson	Inverness Caledonian Thistle	Strathspey Thistle	Free
1 June 2026	Chris Hamilton	Dunfermline Athletic	Ross County	Free
1 June 2026	Brad Lyons	Kilmarnock	Aberdeen	Free
1 June 2026	Lewis Montsma	Dundee	Free agent	Free
1 June 2026	Ethan Ingram	Dundee	Free agent	Free
1 June 2026	Scott Tanser	St Mirren	Falkirk	Free
1 June 2026	James Scott	St Mirren	Free agent	Free
1 June 2026	Lewis Mayo	Kilmarnock	Aberdeen	Free
1 June 2026	Alexander Briedl	Blau-Weiß Linz	Aberdeen	Free
1 June 2026	Jesse Randall	Auckland FC	Dundee United	Free
1 June 2026	Joshua Rawlins	Melbourne Victory	Dundee United	Free
1 June 2026	Lachlan Rose	Newcastle Jets	Dundee United	Free
1 June 2026	Dylan Tait	Falkirk	Dundee United	Free
1 June 2026	Rogers Mato	Vardar	Heart of Midlothian	Free
1 June 2026	Ben Summers	Celtic	Ayr United	Free
1 June 2026	Jack Wilkie	Arbroath	Livingston	Free
1 June 2026	John Robertson	East Kilbride	Raith Rovers	Free
2 June 2026	Bobby McLuckie	Heart of Midlothian	Greenock Morton	Free
3 June 2026	Luis Palma	Celtic	Lech Poznań	£3.5 million
4 June 2026	Kyle Turner	Partick Thistle	Raith Rovers	Free
4 June 2026	Oisin Smyth	St Mirren	Partick Thistle	Free
4 June 2026	Calvin Miller	Falkirk	Heart of Midlothian	Undisclosed
4 June 2026	Euan Henderson	Airdrieonians	Partick Thistle	Free
4 June 2026	Deniss Meļņiks	FK Auda	Falkirk	Free
4 June 2026	Kyle Turner	Partick Thistle	Raith Rovers	Free
4 June 2026	Reece Lyon	Kelty Hearts	Ayr United	Free
5 June 2026	Sam Fisher	Dunfermline Athletic	Airdrieonians	Free
5 June 2026	Ross Millen	Inverness Caledonian Thistle	Raith Rovers	Free
5 June 2026	Charlie Telfer	Airdrieonians	Raith Rovers	Free
9 June 2026	Liam Sole	Livingston	Inverness Caledonian Thistle	Free
9 June 2026	Grant Savoury	Queen's Park	Greenock Morton	Free
9 June 2026	Ethan Laidlaw	Brentford	Falkirk	Undisclosed
9 June 2026	Richard Chin	Raith Rovers	Ross County	Undisclosed
9 June 2026	Ross Taylor	Stenhousemuir	Ayr United	Undisclosed
10 June 2026	Amadou Ba-Sy	FC Rouen	Heart of Midlothian	Undisclosed
10 June 2026	Ben Davies	Rangers	Bolton Wanderers	Free
10 June 2026	Ben Dempsey	Ayr United	Partick Thistle	Free
10 June 2026	Kofi Balmer	Motherwell	Bristol Rovers	Free
11 June 2026	Matthew Todd	Dunfermline Athletic	St Johnstone	Free
11 June 2026	Kenneth Vargas	Heart of Midlothian	Kalamata	Loan
11 June 2026	Arron Lyall	Ross County	Raith Rovers	Free
11 June 2026	Jack Hamilton	Raith Rovers	Queen's Park	Free
11 June 2026	Matthew Todd	Dunfermline Athletic	St Johnstone	Free
11 June 2026	Harry Stone	Heart of Midlothian	Ayr United	Loan
15 June 2026	Lawrence Shankland	Heart of Midlothian	Rangers	Undisclosed
15 June 2026	Ieuan Owen	Barry Town United	Kilmarnock	Undisclosed
15 June 2026	David Watson	Kilmarnock	Bolton Wanderers	Compensation
15 June 2026	Jay Hogarth	Clyde	Falkirk	Free
15 June 2026	Dylan Wells	Motherwell	Linfield	Free
16 June 2026	Noa Boutin	Bournemouth	Inverness Caledonian Thistle	Free
16 June 2026	Toyosi Olusanya	Houston Dynamo	Aberdeen	Free
16 June 2026	Michael Forbes	West Ham United	Dundee United	Free
16 June 2026	Jason Kerr	Wigan Athletic	Hibernian	Free
17 June 2026	Calem Nieuwenhof	Heart of Midlothian	Perth Glory	Loan
17 June 2026	Connor Ronan	Colorado Rapids	Aberdeen	Free
17 June 2026	Unax Álvarez	CD Guadalajara	St Johnstone	Free
17 June 2026	Barney Stewart	Falkirk	West Bromwich Albion	Undisclosed
17 June 2026	Seb Drozd	Queen's Park	Partick Thistle	Free
18 June 2026	Malachi Fagan-Walcott	York City	Heart of Midlothian	Undisclosed
18 June 2026	Kian Corbally	Ballymena United	Dunfermline Athletic	Undisclosed
18 June 2026	Trevor Carson	Dundee	Queen of the South	Free
19 June 2026	Samuel Ramos	Zemplín Michalovce	St Mirren	Free
19 June 2026	Tony Yogane	Brentford	Aberdeen	Free
19 June 2026	Liam Gordon	Motherwell	Gillingham	Free
19 June 2026	Calum Ferrie	Queen's Park	Kilmarnock	Undisclosed
21 June 2026	Logan Chalmers	Partick Thistle	St Johnstone	Free
22 June 2026	David Mitchell	Ayr United	Queen's Park	Free
23 June 2026	Callum Wright	Plymouth Argyle	Hibernian	Free
23 June 2026	Michael Steinwender	Heart of Midlothian	VfL Bochum	Undisclosed
23 June 2026	Morgan Bates	Swansea City	Inverness Caledonian Thistle	Loan
23 June 2026	Zander MacKenzie	Partick Thistle	Queen of the South	Free
23 June 2026	Kieran Shanks	Peterhead	Ayr United	Undisclosed
23 June 2026	Oli Shaw	Hamilton Academical	Dunfermline Athletic	Undisclosed
23 June 2026	Conor McMenamin	St Mirren	Coleraine	Undisclosed
23 June 2026	Roshaun Mathurin	AS Trenčín	Kilmarnock	Free
24 June 2026	Sabri Guendouz	K Beerschot	Heart of Midlothian	Undisclosed
24 June 2026	Tom Renaud	Versailles	Heart of Midlothian	Undisclosed
24 June 2026	Lewis Neilson	Heart of Midlothian	Falkirk	Free
24 June 2026	Ryan Carr	Ipswich Town	St Mirren	Free
24 June 2026	Aaron Comrie	Greenock Morton	Hamilton Academical	Free
25 June 2026	Calvin Miller	Falkirk	Heart of Midlothian	Undisclosed
25 June 2026	Chris Mochrie	Airdrieonians	St Mirren	Free
25 June 2026	Jon McCracken	Dundee	Bradford City	Free
25 June 2026	Fergus Owens	Greenock Morton	Hamilton Academical	Free
26 June 2026	Idris Odutayo	Bromley	Dundee	Free
26 June 2026	Cameron Blues	Greenock Morton	Hamilton Academical	Free
26 June 2026	Alfie Bavidge	Aberdeen	Inverness Caledonian Thistle	Loan
26 June 2026	Hayato Inamura	Celtic	FC Tokyo	Undisclosed
27 June 2026	Sven Sprangler	St Johnstone	Walsall	Undisclosed
27 June 2026	Ryan Finnigan	Blackpool	Dundee	Undisclosed
28 June 2026	Islam Chesnokov	Heart of Midlothian	FC Tobol	Undisclosed
28 June 2026	Mark O'Hara	St Mirren	Kilmarnock	Free
28 June 2026	Bailey Rice	Rangers	Kilmarnock	Loan
28 June 2026	Ayoub Mouloua	FUS Rabat	Aberdeen	Undisclosed
29 June 2026	Jay Hogarth	Falkirk	Clyde	Loan
29 June 2026	Ben Godfrey	Atalanta	Rangers	Loan
29 June 2026	Luke McBeth	Partick Thistle	Ayr United	Undisclosed
29 June 2026	Zak Delaney	Greenock Morton	Raith Rovers	Free
30 June 2026	Ivor Pandur	Hull City	Rangers	£6,000,000
30 June 2026	Luke Armstrong	Cardiff City	Raith Rovers	Loan
30 June 2026	Cormac Daly	Nottingham Forest	Heart of Midlothian	Free
1 July 2026	Jacob Chapman	Huddersfield Town	St Mirren	Undisclosed
1 July 2026	MJ Kamson-Kamara	Lincoln City	Heart of Midlothian	Compensation
1 July 2026	Stephen Welsh	Celtic	Swansea City	Free
1 July 2026	Stuart Findlay	Oxford United	Heart of Midlothian	Free
1 July 2026	Dan Happe	Leyton Orient	Aberdeen	Free
1 July 2026	Dan Neil	Sunderland	Rangers	Free
1 July 2026	Billy Koumetio	Dundee	Charlton Athletic	£500,000
1 July 2026	Jeremiah Chilokoa-Mullen	Dunfermline Athletic	Wigan Athletic	Undisclosed
1 July 2026	Jordan Amissah	Burton Albion	Dundee United	Free
2 July 2026	Jack Butland	Rangers	Hull City	£3,000,000
2 July 2026	Luke Graham	Dundee	Stoke City	£2,000,000
2 July 2026	Miguel Freckleton	St Mirren	LASK	Undisclosed
3 July 2026	Ross Matthews	Raith Rovers	Bentleigh Greens	Free
3 July 2026	Martin Moormann	Blau-Weiß Linz	Motherwell	Undisclosed
3 July 2026	Willy Vogt	Bellinzona	Motherwell	Free
3 July 2026	Samuel Cleall-Harding	Dundee United	Dunfermline Athletic	Loan
3 July 2026	Ryan Duncan	Aberdeen	Inverness Caledonian Thistle	Free
4 July 2026	Erik Ring	Lincoln City	Kilmarnock	Undisclosed
4 July 2026	Azeem Abdulai	Leyton Orient	Hibernian	Undisclosed
4 July 2026	Hamzad Kargbo	Maidstone United	Inverness Caledonian Thistle	Free
6 July 2026	Luke Robinson	Wigan Athletic	Dunfermline Athletic	Free
6 July 2026	Zach Mitchell	Charlton Athletic	St Johnstone	Loan
6 July 2026	Idjessi Metsoko	Viktoria Plzeň	Dundee United	Loan
6 July 2026	Alexander Jensen	Aberdeen	Elfsborg	Undisclosed
7 July 2026	Toby Steward	Portsmouth	St Johnstone	Loan
7 July 2026	Alfie Stewart	Aberdeen	Inverness Caledonian Thistle	Loan
7 July 2026	Owen Stirton	Dundee United	Ayr United	Loan
7 July 2026	Žan Bešir	ND Primorje	Dundee	Free
7 July 2026	Paul Digby	Dundee	Colchester United	Free
8 July 2026	Musa Dibaga	Crusaders	Dunfermline Athletic	Undisclosed
8 July 2026	Emile Acquah	Dundee	Notts County	Undisclosed
8 July 2026	Stuart Bannigan	Ayr United	Hamilton Academical	Free
8 July 2026	Nesta Guinness-Walker	Northampton Town	Aberdeen	Free
9 July 2026	Dan Nlundulu	St Mirren	Petrolul	Free
9 July 2026	Henry Fieldson	Queen's Park	St Mirren	Free
9 July 2026	Jamie Sneddon	Falkirk	Airdrieonians	Free
10 July 2026	Owen Bevan	Bournemouth	Dundee	Free
10 July 2026	Camilo Durán	Qarabağ	Celtic	Undisclosed
10 July 2026	Ben Brannan	Kilmarnock	Queen's Park	Loan
10 July 2026	Ruairidh Adams	Dundee United	Airdrieonians	Loan
10 July 2026	Topi Keskinen	Aberdeen	Odense	Undisclosed
11 July 2026	Cammy Devlin	Heart of Midlothian	Rangers	Free
12 July 2026	Mehdi Merghem	SC Bastia	Dundee United	Free
13 July 2026	Marko Lazetić	Aberdeen	Noah	Undisclosed
13 July 2026	Alex Paulsen	Bournemouth	Motherwell	Loan
13 July 2026	Lewis Smith	Livingston	Aberdeen	Undisclosed
13 July 2026	Alan Forrest	Heart of Midlothian	Dundee	Free
13 July 2026	Tete Yengi	Livingston	Machida Zelvia	Free
13 July 2026	Ben Krauhaus	Brentford	Falkirk	Loan
14 July 2026	Shin Yamada	Celtic	OH Leuven	Loan
14 July 2026	Nathan Lowe	Stoke City	Hibernian	Loan
14 July 2026	Eseosa Sule	West Bromwich Albion	St Mirren	Undisclosed
15 July 2026	Jake Girdwood-Reich	St. Louis City SC	Motherwell	Undisclosed
15 July 2026	Besir Iseni	Dukagjini	Livingston	Free
16 July 2026	Leon King	Rangers	Ayr United	Free
16 July 2026	Gary Oliver	Falkirk	Montrose	Free
16 July 2026	Craig Gordon	Heart of Midlothian	Retired	Free
16 July 2026	Bradly van Hoeven	Motor Lublin	Livingston	Free
16 July 2026	Marius Müller	VFL Wolfsburg	Aberdeen	Free
17 July 2026	Kerr Smith	Aston Villa	Inverness Caledonian Thistle	Free
17 July 2026	Kelechi Iheanacho	Celtic	Bursaspor	Free
17 July 2026	Ryan Strain	Dundee United	Falkirk	Free
17 July 2026	Aston Oxborough	Motherwell	Dunfermline Athletic	Undisclosed
17 July 2026	Liam McFarlane	Heart of Midlothian	Partick Thistle	Loan
17 July 2026	Macaulay Tait	Heart of Midlothian	St Johnstone	Undisclosed
17 July 2026	Beau Reus	Beveren	Heart of Midlothian	Free
17 July 2026	Maik Nawrocki	Celtic	Lens	Undisclosed
18 July 2026	Elliot Watt	Motherwell	Samsunspor	Undisclosed
20 July 2026	Eddie Beach	Kilmarnock	Shelbourne	Undisclosed
20 July 2026	Dylan Williams	Burton Albion	Motherwell	Undisclosed
21 July 2026	Anton Dowds	Ayr United	Raith Rovers	Free
22 July 2026	Elijah Just	Motherwell	Swansea City	£5,000,000
22 July 2026	Murray Johnson	Hibernian	Shelbourne	Loan
23 July 2026	Vanja Dragojević	FK Partizan	Rangers	£4,600,000
24 July 2026	Laurent Mendy	Forest Green Rovers	Heart of Midlothian	Undisclosed
25 July 2026	Danilo	Rangers	Botafogo	Loan
25 July 2026	Daizen Maeda	Celtic	Ipswich Town	Undisclosed
25 July 2026	Alex Lowry	Wycombe Wanderers	Motherwell	Loan
25 July 2026	Aodhan Doherty	Blackburn Rovers	Falkirk	Loan
25 July 2026	Owen Goodman	Crystal Palace	Dundee	Loan
26 July 2026	Deniz Mehmet	Dunfermline Athletic	Queen of the South	Free
28 July 2026	Kasper Høgh	Bodø/Glimt	Celtic	£11,000,000
28 July 2026	Joe Gardner	Nottingham Forest	Falkirk	Undisclosed
28 July 2026	Elyh Harrison	Manchester United	Greenock Morton	Loan
29 July 2026	Oliver Antman	Rangers	Anderlecht	£4,500,000
30 July 2026	Olwethu Makhanya	Philadelphia Union	Rangers	£3,000,000
30 July 2026	Paul Nsio	Rangers	St Mirren	Loan
30 July 2026	Aaron Donnelly	Dundee	Dunfermline Athletic	Loan
30 July 2026	Adam Forrester	Heart of Midlothian	Ross County	Loan
30 July 2026	Daniel Bennie	Queens Park Rangers	Dundee United	Loan
30 July 2026	Ashley Maynard-Brewer	Dundee United	Sheffield Wednesday	Free
31 July 2026	Jamie Knight-Lebel	Bristol City	Motherwell	Loan
31 July 2026	Chris Cadden	Hibernian	Aberdeen	Undisclosed
31 July 2026	Jonathan Meier	SSV Ulm	Kilmarnock	Free
31 July 2026	Johnly Yfeko	Exeter City	Kilmarnock	Undisclosed
1 August 2026	Alexander Schwolow	Heart of Midlothian	Mainz 05	Undisclosed
1 August 2026	Luke Thomas	Bristol Rovers	St Mirren	Free
3 August 2026	Nedim Bajrami	Rangers	Al Taawoun	Loan
4 August 2026	Paulo Bernardo	Celtic	Górnik Zabrze	Loan
4 August 2026	Ewan Otoo	Dunfermline Athletic	Rotherham United	Free
4 August 2026	Kieran Ngwenya	Dunfermline Athletic	Rotherham United	Free
5 August 2026	Mikael Mandron	St Mirren	Stockport County	Free
5 August 2026	Daisuke Yokota	Hannover	Rangers	£2,750,000
7 August 2026	Finley Barbrook	Ipswich Town	Falkirk	Loan
7 August 2026	Daniel MacKay	Partick Thistle	Inverness Caledonian Thistle	Free
7 August 2026	Olamilekan Adams	Dynamo České Budějovice	Dunfermline Athletic	Free
7 August 2026	Allan Oyirwoth	New England Revolution	Dunfermline Athletic	Loan
7 August 2026	Kevin Ciubotaru	Hermannstadt	Dundee United	Free
8 August 2026	Mitchy Ntelo	Yverdon-Sport	Aberdeen	Undisclosed
10 August 2026	Alexandros Kyziridis	Heart of Midlothian	Çorum	£1,700,000
12 August 2026	Mohamed Diomande	Rangers	Çorum	£4,500,000
12 August 2026	Haissem Hassan	Real Oviedo	Celtic	Undisclosed
13 August 2026	Dimitar Mitov	Aberdeen	FC St. Pauli	Undisclosed
13 August 2026	Mika Baur	SC Paderborn	Celtic	Undisclosed
14 August 2026	Kieran Wright	Rangers	Heart of Midlothian	Free
14 August 2026	Dylan Lobban	Aberdeen	Dunfermline Athletic	Loan
14 August 2026	Abdoulaye Yoro	İstanbul Başakşehir	Dundee United	Loan
15 August 2026	James Penrice	AEK Athens	Rangers	Loan
15 August 2026	Ismeal Kabia	Arsenal	St Mirren	Loan
15 August 2026	Arne Engels	Celtic	West Ham United	£22,000,000
18 August 2026	Danny Schmidt	Fortuna Düsseldorf	St Johnstone	Free
18 August 2026	Peter Ambrose	Aberdeen	Neuchâtel Xamax	Undisclosed
18 August 2026	Adam Montgomery	Celtic	Livingston	Loan
18 August 2026	Cathal McCarthy	Hull City	Kilmarnock	Loan
19 August 2026	Kosta Nedeljković	Aston Villa	Rangers	Loan
19 August 2026	Bobby Wales	Swansea City	Dundee	Loan
19 August 2026	Scott Tiffoney	Kilmarnock	Raith Rovers	Loan
19 August 2026	Seb Palmer-Houlden	Gillingham	Motherwell	Undisclosed
21 August 2026	Jacob Murrell	DC United	Falkirk	Free
22 August 2026	Bradley Fink	Wycombe Wanderers	Dundee	Loan
23 August 2026	Jacob Devaney	Manchester United	Hibernian	Loan
23 August 2026	Colton Swan	Charleston Battery	Hibernian	Undisclosed
24 August 2026	Christopher Cupps	Chicago Fire	Greenock Morton	Loan
24 August 2026	Enes Alić	Željezničar	St Johnstone	Free
24 August 2026	Conor McLeod	Wolverhampton Wanderers	Falkirk	Loan
25 August 2026	Ethan Schilte-Brown	Kilmarnock	Glentoran	Loan
25 August 2026	Alasana Manneh	Hibernian	Kolding IF	Free
25 August 2026	Julius Eskesen	Dundee United	KuPS	Loan
25 August 2026	Calvin Ramsay	Liverpool	St Mirren	Loan
25 August 2026	Sahil Bashir	Huddersfield Town	Greenock Morton	Loan
25 August 2026	JJ Williams	Rhode Island	Heart of Midlothian	Undisclosed
27 August 2026	Matai Akinmboni	Bournemouth	Dundee	Loan
27 August 2026	Kim Min-su	Girona	Rangers	£8,500,000
28 August 2026	Jack Baird	St Johnstone	Raith Rovers	Undisclosed
28 August 2026	Jack Thomson	Kilmarnock	Swindon Town	Undisclosed
28 August 2026	Jardell Kanga	Ilves	Motherwell	Undisclosed
29 August 2026	Michel-Ange Balikwisha	Celtic	Gent	Loan
30 August 2026	Nikolas Agrafiotis	Wehen Wiesbaden	St Mirren	Undisclosed
30 August 2026	Louis Jackson	Manchester United	St Mirren	Loan
31 August 2026	Kusini Yengi	Aberdeen	Sanfrecce Hiroshima	Loan
31 August 2026	Ricco Diack	Partick Thistle	Ross County	Loan
31 August 2026	Joe Wright	Bradford City	Dundee	Undisclosed
1 September 2026	Sander Kartum	Heart of Midlothian	Aalesunds	Free
1 September 2026	Reo Hatate	Celtic	Burnley	Undisclosed
1 September 2026	Dylan Levitt	Leyton Orient	Motherwell	Undisclosed
1 September 2026	Johnny Kenny	Celtic	Preston North End	Undisclosed
1 September 2026	Jack Moorhouse	Manchester United	Dundee	Loan
1 September 2026	Oliver Sørensen	Parma	Celtic	Loan
1 September 2026	Lyall Cameron	Rangers	Dundee United	Loan
1 September 2026	Connor Barron	Rangers	Middlesbrough	Loan
2 September 2026	Sam Johnstone	Wolverhampton Wanderers	Celtic	Loan
2 September 2026	Landon Emenalo	Chelsea	Celtic	Loan
2 September 2026	Thelo Aasgaard	Rangers	Anderlecht	Loan
2 September 2026	Joël van den Berg	PSV Eindhoven	Celtic	Undisclosed
2 September 2026	Jordan Lotomba	Feyenoord	Celtic	Undisclosed
2 September 2026	Marko Ivezić	Holstein Kiel	Hibernian	Undisclosed
2 September 2026	Warren O'Hora	Hibernian	Leicester City	Undisclosed
2 September 2026	Aron Benjaminsen	Víkingur Gøta	Heart of Midlothian	Undisclosed
2 September 2026	Shim Mheuka	Chelsea	Celtic	Loan
3 September 2026	Olly Whyte	Motherwell	Ayr United	Loan
3 September 2026	Owen Eames	Derby County	Falkirk	Loan
3 September 2026	Joel Cotterill	Swansea City	St Johnstone	Undisclosed
3 September 2026	Kevin Kelsy	Portland Timbers	Rangers	£9,000,000
3 September 2026	Badredine Bouanani	VfB Stuttgart	Rangers	Loan
3 September 2026	MJ Kamson-Kamara	Heart of Midlothian	Kilmarnock	Loan
3 September 2026	Alex Williams	West Bromwich Albion	Hibernian	Loan
3 September 2026	Josh Campbell	Hibernian	St Johnstone	Loan
3 September 2026	Zidane Iqbal	Utrecht	Dundee United	Undisclosed
3 September 2026	Leart Kabashi	Grasshopper	Heart of Midlothian	Undisclosed

== See also ==
- List of Scottish football transfers winter 2025–26
- List of Scottish football transfers winter 2026–27
