= List of Scottish football transfers winter 2026–27 =

This is a list of Scottish football transfers featuring at least one 2026–27 Scottish Premiership club or one 2026–27 Scottish Championship club which were completed after the summer 2026 transfer window closed and before the end of the 2026–27 season.

== List ==
Date	Name	Moving from	Moving to	Fee
4 September 2026	Olly Thomas	Bristol City	Dunfermline Athletic	Loan
4 September 2026	Kenan Bilalović	Aberdeen	MŠK Žilina	Loan
7 October 2026	Rabbi Matondo	Brann	Hibernian	Free

== See also ==
- List of Scottish football transfers summer 2026
