= Rory McLeod =

Rory McLeod may refer to:

- Rory McLeod (singer-songwriter) (1957–2025), English songwriter and performer
- Rory McLeod (snooker player) (born 1971), English snooker player

== See also ==
- Rory MacLeod (born 2006), Scottish footballer
