= Norrie McCathie =

Scottish footballer

Personal information
- Date of birth: 23 March 1961
- Place of birth: Edinburgh, Scotland
- Date of death: 8 January 1996 (aged 34)
- Place of death: Dunfermline, Scotland
- Position: Defender

Senior career*
Years	Team	Apps	(Gls)
1980–1981	Cowdenbeath	11	(0)
1981–1996	Dunfermline Athletic	495	(55)
1989	→ Ayr United (loan)	2	(0)
Total		508	(55)
- * Club domestic league appearances and goals

Norman "Norrie" McCathie (23 March 1961 – 8 January 1996) was a Scottish professional footballer best known for time with Scottish club Dunfermline Athletic.

Signed by Dunfermline in August 1981 from Cowdenbeath, McCathie went on to play a club record of 576 games between 1981 and 1996.

== Career ==
McCathie made his Dunfermline debut on 24 October 1981 against Ayr United and scored his first goal three days later in a 3–1 win over Queen's Park. By 1984, McCathie had become a regular in the Dunfermline team and helped the club to successive promotions to the First Division in season 1985–86 and to the Scottish Premier Division in season 1986–87.

McCathie sustained a career-threatening injury in 1989 and went on loan to Ayr United during his rehabilitation. He returned in January and scored in his return match against Airdrieonians. He went on to play in every match for Dunfermline in the next two seasons and helped the club reach the League Cup final in season 1991–92.

=== Final appearance ===
McCathie's final appearance on the field was a 2–1 defeat against St.Mirren at St.Mirren Park on 6 January 1996. That season Dunfermline went on to gain promotion to the Scottish Premier Division.

== Death ==
McCathie died on 8 January 1996 from carbon monoxide poisoning, aged 34, at his home in Fife. His 26-year-old girlfriend Amanda Burns also died in the tragedy. He had separated from his pregnant wife Julie in late 1995, and their daughter Jade Clare was born in March 1996 just over two months after his death. He also had two older children, Alison and Paul.

== Tributes ==
Following McCathie's untimely death, his shirt number 4 was retired for the remainder of the 1995–96 season.

In December 1998, a stand at the club's East End Park stadium was named after him. The stand is also home to a large banner & picture of Norrie with words reading, "Lead From The Front, Never Beaten" as well as "Legend 4 Ever".

== See also ==
- List of footballers in Scotland by number of league appearances (500+)
