= Dunfermline Athletic F.C. in European football =

Scottish club in European football

Dunfermline Athletic in European football
- Club: Dunfermline Athletic
- First entry: 1961–62 European Cup Winners' Cup
- Latest entry: 2007–08 UEFA Cup

Titles
- Europa League: 0 (Best: Second qualifying round)
- Cup Winners' Cup: 0 (Best: Semi-finals)

Dunfermline Athletic Football Club is a Scottish football club based in Dunfermline, Fife. The club first competed in a European competition in 1961–62, entering the UEFA Cup Winners' Cup. The club reached the quarter-finals on its first attempt. Their best run came in 1968–69 when they reached the semi-finals of the same competition.

== Matches ==
List of Dunfermline games in European competitions
Season	Competition	Round	Opponent	Home	Away	Other	Agg.	(Note: Round or group progressed or eliminated)	Notes	Ref
1961–62	Cup Winners' Cup	PR	(Republic of Ireland) St Patrick's Athletic	4–1	4–0	—N/a	8–1		—N/a	
1961–62	Cup Winners' Cup	1R	(Socialist Federal Republic of Yugoslavia) FK Vardar	5–0	0–2	—N/a	5–2		—N/a	
1961–62	Cup Winners' Cup	QF	(Hungary) Újpesti Dózsa	0–1	3–4	—N/a	3–5		—N/a	
1962–63	Fairs Cup	1R	(England) Everton	2–0	0–1	—N/a	2–1		—N/a	
1962–63	Fairs Cup	2R	(Spain) Valencia	6–2	0–4	0–1	6–7		Playoff	
1964–65	Fairs Cup	1R	(Sweden) Örgryte IS	4–2	0–0	—N/a	4–2		—N/a	
1964–65	Fairs Cup	2R	(West Germany) VfB Stuttgart	1–0	0–0	—N/a	1–0		—N/a	
1964–65	Fairs Cup	3R	(Spain) Athletic Bilbao	1–0	0–1	1–2	2–3		Playoff	
1965–66	Fairs Cup	2R	(Denmark) Boldklubben 1903	5–0	4–2	—N/a	9–2		—N/a	
1965–66	Fairs Cup	3R	(Czechoslovakia) Spartak Brno	2–0	0–0	—N/a	2–0		—N/a	
1965–66	Fairs Cup	QF	(Spain) Real Zaragoza	1–0	2–4	—N/a	3–4		Extra time	
1966–67	Fairs Cup	1R	(Norway) SK Frigg	3–1	3–1	—N/a	6–2		—N/a	
1966–67	Fairs Cup	2R	(Socialist Federal Republic of Yugoslavia) Dinamo Zagreb	4–2	0–2	—N/a	4–4		Away goals	
1968–69	Cup Winners' Cup	1R	(Cyprus) APOEL	10–1	2–0	—N/a	12–1		—N/a	
1968–69	Cup Winners' Cup	2R	(Greece) Olympiacos	4–0	0–3	—N/a	4–3		—N/a	
1968–69	Cup Winners' Cup	QF	(England) West Bromwich Albion	0–0	1–0	—N/a	1–0		—N/a	
1968–69	Cup Winners' Cup	SF	(Czechoslovakia) Slovan Bratislava	1–1	0–1	—N/a	1–2		—N/a	
1969–70	Fairs Cup	1R	(France) Bordeaux	4–0	0–2	—N/a	4–2		—N/a	
1969–70	Fairs Cup	2R	(Poland) Gwardia Warszawa	2–1	1–0	—N/a	3–1		—N/a	
1969–70	Fairs Cup	3R	(Belgium) Anderlecht	3–2	0–1	—N/a	3–3		Away goals	
2004–05	UEFA Cup	2QR	(Iceland) FH	1–2	2–2	—N/a	3–4		—N/a	
2007–08	UEFA Cup	2QR	(Sweden) BK Häcken	1–1	0–1	—N/a	1–2		—N/a	

== Overall record ==
=== By competition ===
Competition	P	W	D	L	GF	GA	GD
Inter-Cities Fairs Cup	28	16	3	9	49	31	+18
UEFA Cup Winners' Cup	14	7	2	5	34	14	+20
UEFA Cup	4	0	2	2	4	6	−2
Total	46	23	7	16	87	51	+36

=== By country ===
Country	Pld	W	D	L	GF	GA	GD	Win%	Ref
Belgium	2	1	0	1	3	3	+0	50.00	
Cyprus	2	2	0	0	12	1	+11	100.00	
Czechoslovakia	4	1	2	1	3	2	+1	25.00	
Denmark	2	2	0	0	9	2	+7	100.00	
England	4	2	1	1	3	1	+2	50.00	
France	2	1	0	1	4	2	+2	50.00	
Greece	2	1	0	1	4	3	+1	50.00	
Hungary	2	0	0	2	3	5	−2	0.00	
Iceland	2	0	1	1	3	4	−1	0.00	
Ireland	2	2	0	0	8	1	+7	100.00	
Norway	2	2	0	0	6	2	+4	100.00	
Poland	2	2	0	0	3	1	+2	100.00	
Spain	8	3	0	5	11	14	−3	37.50	
Sweden	4	1	2	1	5	4	+1	25.00	
West Germany	2	1	1	0	1	0	+1	50.00	
Yugoslavia	4	2	0	2	9	6	+3	50.00	
