= Robbie Fraser (footballer) =

Scottish footballer (born 2003)

Personal information
- Date of birth: 2 April 2003 (age 23)
- Place of birth: Glasgow, Scotland
- Position: Defender

Team information
- Current team: Dunfermline Athletic

Youth career
- 2010–2024: Rangers

Senior career*
Years	Team	Apps	(Gls)
2024–2025	Rangers	4	(0)
2025	→ Livingston (loan)	16	(1)
2025–	Dunfermline Athletic	31	(1)
- * Club domestic league appearances and goals as of 4 May 2026

Robbie Fraser (born 2 April 2003) is a Scottish professional footballer who plays as a defender for Scottish Championship club Dunfermline Athletic. He has previously played for Rangers and Livingston.

== Career ==
Fraser played through the Rangers Academy, having joined in 2010 as a seven-year-old and was club captain of the B-Team. He signed a one-year contract with the club on 9 May 2023. Fraser made his debut for Rangers during a Scottish Premiership match in 5-2 home win at Ibrox Stadium against Dundee on 14 May 2024. On 15 May 2024, Fraser has signed further contract extension until 2026. He made his UEFA Europa League debut in a game on 12 December 2024 against Tottenham Hotspur coming on for Ridvan Yilmaz on 80th minute in a 1-1 draw. On 3 January 2025, Fraser joined Livingston on loan for the remainder of the season.

Fraser moved to Scottish Championship club Dunfermline Athletic in August 2025 for an undisclosed transfer fee.

== Career statistics ==
As of match played 29 July 2026

Appearances and goals by club, season and competition
Club	Season	League			National Cup		League Cup		Continental		Other		Total	
Club	Season	Division	Apps	Goals	Apps	Goals	Apps	Goals	Apps	Goals	Apps	Goals	Apps	Goals
Rangers
Rangers	2023–24	Scottish Premiership	2	0	0	0	0	0	0	0	—		2	0
Rangers	2024–25	Scottish Premiership	1	0	0	0	1	0	1	0	—		3	0
Rangers	Rangers Total		3	0	0	0	1	0	1	0	—		5	0
Livingston (loan)	2024-25	Scottish Championship	16	1	3	0	0	0	—		4 (Note: Four appearances in the Scottish Premiership play-offs)	0	23	1
Dunfermline Athletic	2025-26	Scottish Championship	31	1	6	0	0	0	—		4 (Note: Appearances in the Scottish Premiership play-offs)	0	41	1
Dunfermline Athletic	2026-27	Scottish Championship	0	0	0	0	4	0	—		0	0	4	0
Dunfermline Athletic	Dunfermline Total		31	1	6	0	4	0	—		4	0	45	1
Career total			50	2	9	0	5	0	1	0	8	0	73	2

== Honours ==
Livingston

- Scottish Premiership play-offs: 2025
