= Olly Thomas =

English footballer

Personal information
- Full name: Oliver Charlie Thomas
- Date of birth: 18 April 2005 (age 21)
- Place of birth: Bristol, England
- Height: 1.82 m (6 ft 0 in)
- Position: Forward

Team information
- Current team: Dunfermline Athletic
- Number: 17

Youth career
- –2023: Bristol City

Senior career*
Years	Team	Apps	(Gls)
2023–2026	Bristol City	3	(0)
2023	→ Bath City (loan)	1	(0)
2023	→ Yeovil Town (loan)	6	(1)
2023	→ Newport County (loan)	8	(0)
2024	→ Yeovil Town (loan)	6	(0)
2026	→ Dunfermline Athletic (loan)	8	(0)
2026–	Dunfermline Athletic	3	(0)
- * Club domestic league appearances and goals as of 19:54, 24 October 2026 (UTC)

Oliver Charlie Thomas (born 18 April 2005) is an English professional footballer who plays as a striker for Scottish Championship club Dunfermline Athletic.

== Early life ==
Born in Bristol, Thomas grew up in the district of Bradley Stoke. He played for Mangotsfield and represented South Gloucestershire before joining Bristol City at the Under-16 level.

== Career ==
In January 2023 Thomas joined Bath City on loan from Bristol City for the remainder of the 2022–23 season. He played for Bath on 7 January 2023 against Eastbourne Borough. However, by the end of the month he was recalled by Bristol City following the sale of Antoine Semenyo. Thomas had a senior Bristol City first team match day experience being named as a substitute in the FA Cup against West Brom on 28 January 2023. He continued to train with the first team. In March 2023, it was revealed that Thomas had signed a professional contract with Bristol City, agreeing a two-year contract until the summer of 2025.

In July 2023, Thomas joined Yeovil Town of the National League South, on a six-month loan. He made his debut for Yeovil against Hemel Hempstead on 5 August 2023. On 15 August 2023, he scored his first goal for Yeovil against Truro City. He was recalled by Bristol City from the loan on 31 August 2023. The following day he joined EFL League Two side Newport County on a season-long loan. He made his debut for Newport on 2 September 2023, at home against AFC Wimbledon. On 24 November 2023, Thomas was recalled by Bristol City. On 29 January 2024, Thomas re-joined Yeovil Town in the National League South on loan until the end of the season.

Thomas made his senior league debut for Bristol City in a 1–0 win in the EFL Championship at home against Birmingham City on 25 October 2025.

On 7 January 2026, Thomas signed a two-and-a-half-year contract extension with Bristol City until the summer of 2028, and subsequently joined Scottish Championship side Dunfermline Athletic on loan until the end of the 2025–26 season. On 7 March, Thomas scored twice as Dunfermline defeated defending champions Aberdeen 3-0 to reach the semi-finals of the 2025–26 Scottish Cup. That September, he signed for Dunfermline on a permanent basis.

== Career statistics ==
As of match played 14 March 2026

Appearances and goals by club, season and competition
Club	Season	League			National cup (Note: Includes Scottish Cup)		League cup		Other		Total	
Club	Season	Division	Apps	Goals	Apps	Goals	Apps	Goals	Apps	Goals	Apps	Goals
Bristol City	2022–23	Championship	0	0	0	0	0	0	—		0	0
Bristol City	2023–24	Championship	0	0	0	0	0	0	—		0	0
Bristol City	2024–25	Championship	0	0	0	0	0	0	0	0	0	0
Bristol City	2025–26	Championship	3	0	0	0	0	0	—		3	0
Bristol City	Total		3	0	0	0	0	0	0	0	3	0
Bath City (loan)	2022–23	National League South	1	0	0	0	—		1 (Note: Appearance in FA Trophy)	0	2	0
Yeovil Town (loan)	2023–24	National League South	6	1	0	0	—		0	0	6	1
Newport County (loan)	2023–24	League Two	8	0	0	0	0	0	1 (Note: Appearance in EFL Trophy)	0	9	0
Yeovil Town (loan)	2023–24	National League South	6	0	—		—		—		6	0
Dunfermline Athletic (loan)	2025–26	Scottish Championship	8	0	2	2	—		—		10	2
Career total			32	1	2	2	0	0	2	0	36	3

== Honours ==
Yeovil Town

- National League South: 2023–24
