= Rory MacLeod =

Scottish footballer (born 2006)

Rory Macleod
Personal information
- Full name: Rory Iain MacLeod
- Date of birth: 3 February 2006 (age 20)
- Place of birth: Dundee, Scotland
- Height: 1.72 m (5 ft 8 in)
- Positions: Forward; right winger

Team information
- Current team: Dunfermline Athletic
- Number: 16

Youth career
- Dundee United

Senior career*
Years	Team	Apps	(Gls)
2022–2025	Dundee United	22	(0)
2023–2024	→ Forfar Athletic (loan)	7	(0)
2024–2025	→ Southampton (loan)	0	(0)
2025–	Dunfermline Athletic	26	(5)

International career^{‡}
2021	Scotland U16	4	(1)
2022–2023	Scotland U17	10	(0)
2023–2024	Scotland U19	9	(1)
- * Club domestic league appearances and goals as of 06:13, 21 November 2026 (UTC) ‡ National team caps and goals as of 08:35, 1 September 2025 (UTC)

Rory MacLeod (born 3 February 2006) is a Scottish professional footballer who plays as a forward or right winger for Scottish Championship club Dunfermline Athletic.

== Club career ==
In December 2021, aged only 15, MacLeod signed his first professional deal with Dundee United. On 9 February 2022, he became Dundee United's youngest player ever at the age of 16 years and 6 days when he came on as a late substitute in a 2–0 win over Motherwell. On 14 September 2023, MacLeod joined Scottish League Two side Forfar Athletic on loan until January 2024.

On 30 August 2024, he joined Premier League side Southampton on a season-long loan, joining the Under-21 squad.

On 11 July 2025, Macleod joined Scottish Championship side Dunfermline Athletic on a permanent deal for an undisclosed fee. His start with the club was interrupted by a spell in hospital to treat a throat abscess.

== International career ==
In October 2021, MacLeod was called up the Scotland under-16 squad for their Victory Shield matches. He scored in victory over Wales U16. In February 2022, he received his first call-up to the Scotland under-17 squad. In August 2023, he was called up to the under–19 squad for the first time.

== Career statistics ==
=== Club ===
As of match played 6 November 2026

Appearances and goals by club, season and competition
Club	Season	League			National Cup		League Cup		Other		Total	
Club	Season	Division	Apps	Goals	Apps	Goals	Apps	Goals	Apps	Goals	Apps	Goals
Dundee United	2021–22	Scottish Premiership	3	0	0	0	0	0	0	0	3	0
Dundee United	2022–23	Scottish Premiership	15	0	2	0	0	0	0	0	17	0
Dundee United	2023–24	Scottish Championship	4	0	0	0	3	0	0	0	7	0
Dundee United	2024–25	Scottish Premiership	0	0	0	0	1	0	0	0	1	0
Dundee United	Total		22	0	2	0	4	0	0	0	28	0
Forfar Athletic (loan)	2023–24	Scottish League Two	7	0	0	0	0	0	0	0	7	0
Southampton (loan)	2024–25	Premier League	0	0	0	0	0	0	—		0	0
Dunfermline Athletic	2025–26	Scottish Championship	16	2	0	0	2	1	1 (Note: Appearance in Scottish Challenge Cup)	1	19	4
Dunfermline Athletic	2026–27	Scottish Championship	10	3	0	0	2	0	1	0	13	3
Dunfermline Athletic	Total		26	5	0	0	4	1	1	1	32	7
Career total			55	5	2	0	8	1	1	1	67	7
