= Billy Terrell =

English footballer (born 2003)

Personal information
- Date of birth: 31 August 2003 (age 23)
- Place of birth: Southampton, England
- Position: Goalkeeper

Team information
- Current team: Dunfermline Athletic
- Number: 40

Youth career
- 2012–2017: Portsmouth
- 2017–2018: Southampton
- 2018–2025: AFC Bournemouth

Senior career*
Years	Team	Apps	(Gls)
2021–2025	AFC Bournemouth	0	(0)
2020–2021	→ Wimborne Town (loan)	5	(0)
2021–2022	→ Wimborne Town (loan)	12	(0)
2022–2023	→ Weymouth (loan)	4	(0)
2023–2024	→ Dover Athletic (loan)	21	(0)
2024	→ Dartford (loan)	12	(0)
2024–2025	→ Weymouth (loan)	7	(0)
2025–	Dunfermline Athletic	15	(0)
- * Club domestic league appearances and goals as of 23:59, 14 April 2026 (UTC)

Billy Terrell, also known as Billy Terrall, (born 31 August 2003) is an English professional footballer who plays as a goalkeeper for Scottish Championship club Dunfermline Athletic.

== Club career ==
=== AFC Bournemouth ===
Born in Southampton, Terrell previously played within the youth academies of both Portsmouth (2012–2017) and Southampton (2017–2018) before joining the youth academy at AFC Bournemouth in 2018.

He signed his first professional contract with AFC Bournemouth on 1 January 2021 and he was contracted to both their youth academy and their senior team until August 2025, making no appearances for AFC Bournemouth during 2025–26.

==== Wimborne Town (Two loan spells) ====
Terrell was loaned out to Wimborne Town during the 2020–21 season and he made ten appearances in all competitions, all coming in 2020 as the league season was curtailed before all matches could be played.

He was loaned out again to Wimborne Town during the 2021–22 season, making a further sixteen appearances for the club.

==== Weymouth (First loan spell) ====
Terrell was loaned out to Weymouth between 20 August 2022 and 1 January 2023 and made four appearances for the club.

==== Dover Athletic (Loan) ====
During the first half of the 2023–24 season, (Note: Terrell was initially loaned to Dover Athletic on a season long loan but he was recalled by AFC Bournemouth on 9 January 2023.) he was loaned out to Dover Athletic after Stuart Nelson moved to Cirencester Town, and during his time at the club, Terrell was a regular inclusion in the starting line-up.

==== Dartford (Loan) ====
For the remainder of the 2023–24 season, Terrell was loaned out to Dartford as a replacement for Ryan Sandford, who had moved to Crawley Town. He played all twelve league matches for Dartford during his time at the club.

==== Weymouth (Second loan spell) ====
Terrell was loaned out to Weymouth for a second time during what was initially planned to be a season-long deal encompassing the 2024–25 season as a replacement for Gerard Benfield, who was loaned out by Weymouth to Dorchester Town. (Note: Benfield was initially loaned to Dorchester Town on a season long loan but he was recalled by Weymouth no later than 7 September 2024 and went back on loan to Dorchester Town on 17 September 2024.)

Terrell only appeared in seven league for Weymouth during the 2024–25 season, and despite this, he became an unused substitute during a 2–1 away win against Dorking Wanderers on 7 September 2024 as Benfield was recalled from his loan spell at Dorchester Town to play one match for Weymouth.

Terrell was named as the substitute goalkeeper during Weymouth's 2–0 loss against Forest Green Rovers during the FA Cup 4th qualifying round match on 13 October 2024. He also featured during a 3–0 win against Wimborne Town during the 2024–25 Dorset Senior Cup quarter-final on 12 November 2024.

Terrell did not play in any league matches for Weymouth since September 2024, with the club favouring to instead start goalkeeper Will Buse, who was signed on a loan deal from Yeovil Town until June 2025. Terrell's second loan spell with Weymouth would then end prematurely on 17 January 2025, and he returned to Bournemouth on the same day.

=== Dunfermline Athletic ===
On 1 August 2025, Terrell signed a one-year deal with Scottish Championship club Dunfermline Athletic. He made his debut for the club on 23 September 2025 during the 1–0 loss against Ayr United, playing the full match. He was a runner-up in the 2025–26 Scottish Cup.

On 13 February 2026, he extended his contract until 2028.

== Career statistics ==
=== Club ===
As of match played 14 July 2026

Appearances and goals by club, season and competition
Club	Season	League			National cup (Note: Includes FA Cup and Scottish Cup)		League cup (Note: Includes EFL Cup and Scottish League Cup)		Other		Total	
Club	Season	Division	Apps	Goals	Apps	Goals	Apps	Goals	Apps	Goals	Apps	Goals
AFC Bournemouth	2020–21	EFL Championship	0	0	0	0	0	0	—		0	0
AFC Bournemouth	2021–22	EFL Championship	0	0	0	0	0	0	—		0	0
AFC Bournemouth	2022–23	Premier League	0	0	0	0	0	0	—		0	0
AFC Bournemouth	2023–24	Premier League	0	0	0	0	0	0	—		0	0
AFC Bournemouth	2024–25	Premier League	0	0	0	0	0	0	—		0	0
AFC Bournemouth	2025–26	Premier League	—		—		—		0	0	0	0
AFC Bournemouth	Total		0	0	0	0	0	0	0	0	0	0
Wimborne Town (loan)	2020–21	Southern Football League Premier Division South	5	0	5	0	—		0	0	10	0
Wimborne Town (loan)	2021–22	Southern Football League Premier Division South	12	0	3	0	—		1 (Note: Appearance in FA Trophy)	0	16	0
Weymouth (loan)	2022–23	National League South	4	0	0	0	—		0	0	4	0
Dover Athletic (loan)	2023–24	National League South	21	0	3	0	—		1	0	25	0
Dartford (loan)	2023–24	National League South	12	0	0	0	—		0	0	12	0
Weymouth (loan)	2024–25	National League South	7	0	1	0	—		1 (Note: Appearance in Dorset Senior Cup)	0	9	0
Total			63	0	12	0	—		3	0	78	0
Dunfermline Athletic	2025–26	Scottish Championship	15	0	2	0	0	0	1 (Note: Appearance in promotion play-offs)	0	18	0
Dunfermline Athletic	2026–27	Scottish Championship	0	0	0	0	1	0	0	0	1	0
Dunfermline Athletic	Total		15	0	2	0	0	0	1	0	19	0
Career total			78	0	14	0	1	0	4	0	97	0
