= East End Park =

Football stadium in Dunfermline, Scotland

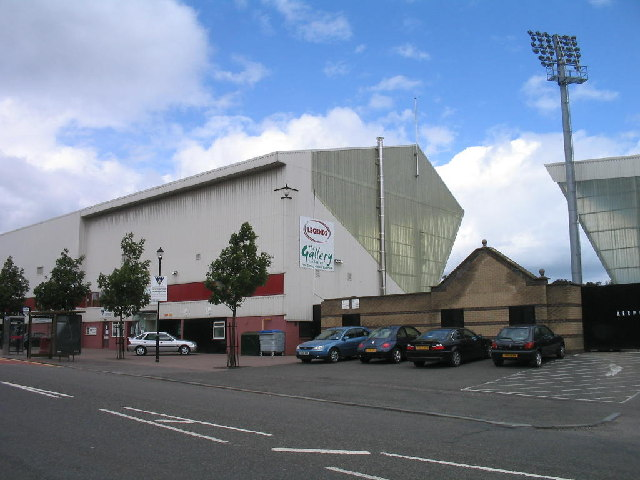
- View of the ground

- Location in Fife
- Location: Dunfermline, Scotland
- Coordinates: 56°04′31″N 3°26′31″W
- Owner: East End Park Limited
- Capacity: 11,480
- Surface: Grass
- Field size: 105 x 64 metres (pitch)

Construction
- Opened: 1885

Tenant
- Dunfermline Athletic F.C.

East End Park, currently named KDM Group East End Park for sponsorship purposes, is a football stadium situated in Dunfermline, Fife, Scotland with a seating capacity of 11,480.

The stadium plays host to the home matches of Scottish Championship side, Dunfermline Athletic The stadium currently comprises four stands: the East Stand (currently sponsored by SQMC), the Main Stand (currently sponsored by srj windows), the North Stand and the Norrie McCathie Stand. The stadium is all seater and has under-soil heating.

== History ==
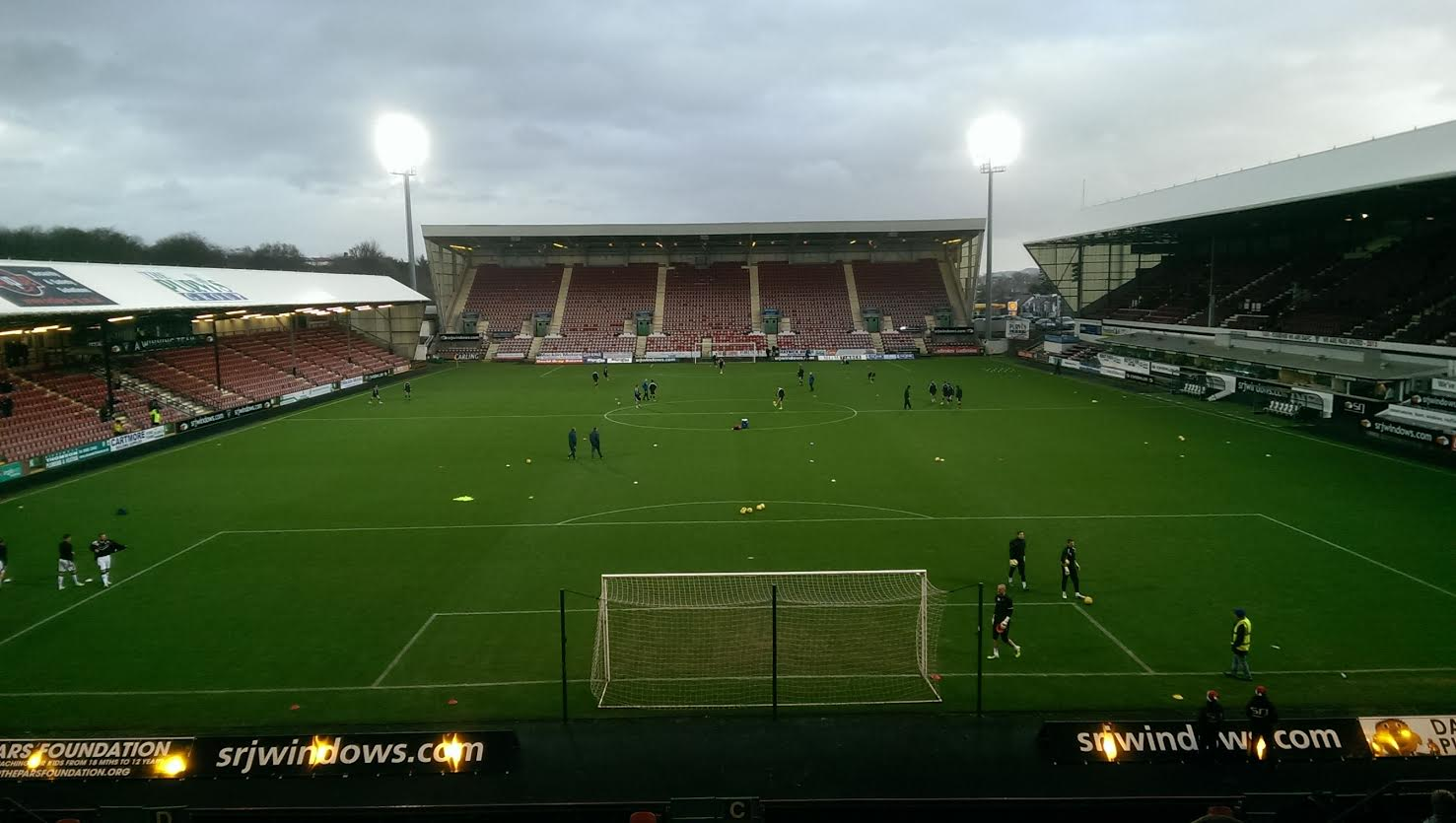
View of East End Park from the Norrie McCathie stand

East End Park was first used in 1885, the same year as the club was formed. The original stadium was situated slightly to the west. In 1920, the Board of Directors purchased 3 acres (12,000 m^{2}) of land from the North British Railway company for £3,500, and the present position of the ground was laid out. A wooden stand with a low roof and a pavilion were built on the southern side, backing onto Halbeath Road (A907). Terrace banks were extended to give a capacity of 16,000 when the club was promoted to the First Division in 1926. Relegation and the effects of the Great Depression forced East End Park to be used for greyhound racing in the early 1930s. The rent from this activity helped keep the club afloat, but the dog track cut across the corners of the pitch. Dunfermline were promoted in 1934 and a roof was built over the northern terrace. One year later, the eastern terrace was improved using wood salvaged from the liner Mauretania, which was being broken up in the Rosyth Dockyards.

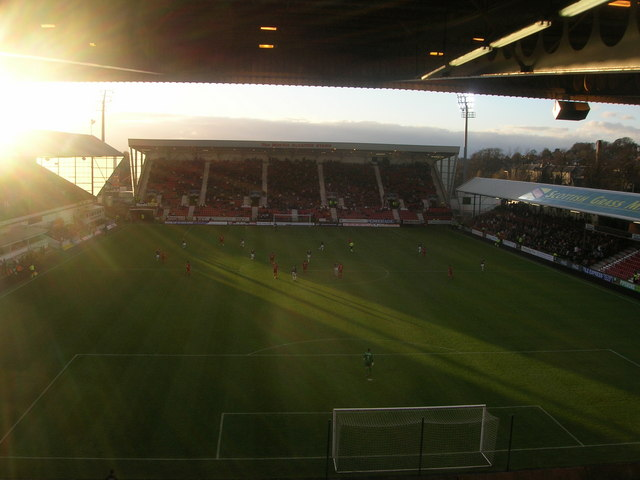
Interior of East End Park

Polish and British army units were stationed at East End Park during the Second World War. Dunfermline received £329 in compensation, but the ground remained quite primitive. Crush barriers were not installed until 1951, after a 20,000 crowd had attended a match. East End Park was greatly developed between 1957 and 1970, a period in which the club qualified several times for European competition. A two-tier Main Stand was constructed in 1962, funded by the club winning the 1960–61 Scottish Cup. The terracing was also improved, with an L-shaped roof formed over the western and northern sections. The record attendance for a Dunfermline Athletic home game of 27,816 was against Celtic on 30 April 1968. There were some chaotic crowd scenes, as people scaled the stand roof and floodlight pylons to gain access. One person died from his injuries after falling.

In the late 1990s, East End Park was converted to an all-seater stadium with a capacity of 12,509. But since then, the capacity has been downgraded to the present 11,480. Since then there have been sell-outs against Rangers in the Scottish Cup and against Raith Rovers in a title decider for the 2010–11 Scottish First Division. An artificial playing surface was installed at East End Park in 2003, as part of an experiment by UEFA. Opposing managers and players expressed reservations at the time that the surface could lead to injuries. The pitch was subsequently replaced with grass two seasons later. The 2006–07 Scottish Junior Cup Final between Kelty Hearts and Linlithgow Rose was held at East End Park on 3 June 2007. Dunfermline announced in November 2011 that the North Stand was to close, in order to reduce operating costs. However, in July 2012 the club announced it planned to reopen the stand.

In August 2022, Dunfermline made a long-term business agreement with local business KDM Group, which included renaming the stadium KDM Group East End Park, whilst the East Stand has been renamed as the Vertu Community Stand thanks to a partnership with the dealership located next door.

== Greyhound racing ==
The greyhound racing was independent (unlicensed) and started on 5 June 1931 until 1951.
