= Aston Oxborough =

English footballer (born 1998)

Personal information
- Full name: Aston Jay Oxborough
- Date of birth: 9 May 1998 (age 28)
- Place of birth: Great Yarmouth, England
- Height: 1.96 m (6 ft 5 in)
- Position: Goalkeeper

Team information
- Current team: Dunfermline Athletic
- Number: 1

Senior career*
Years	Team	Apps	(Gls)
2018–2022	Norwich City	0	(0)
2019–2020	→ Wealdstone (loan)	22	(0)
2020–2021	→ Barnet (loan)	22	(0)
2022–2026	Motherwell	25	(0)
2026	→ Dunfermline Athletic (loan)	9	(0)
2026–	Dunfermline Athletic	1	(0)
- * Club domestic league appearances and goals as of 20:23, 1 August 2026

Aston Jay Oxborough (born 9 May 1998) is an English footballer who plays as a goalkeeper for Dunfermline Athletic.

== Early life ==
Oxborough was born in 1998 in England, He grew up in Norfolk, England.

== Career ==
In 2019, Oxborough was sent on loan to English side Wealdstone. He helped the club win the league.

On 13 August 2022, Oxborough signed for Scottish side Motherwell. On 3 August 2024, he debuted for the club during a 0–0 draw with Ross County. On 10 October 2024, Oxborough signed a contract extension with Motherwell until the summer of 2027, with an option for an additional season. On 24 February 2026, Oxborough joined Dunfermline Athletic on loan for the remainder of the season. On 9 March 2026, Motherwell announced that Oxborough had returned to the club from his loan deal with Dunfermline Athletic after Matthew Connelly suffered an injury in training, with Oxborough scheduled to return to Dunfermline once Connelly had recovered from his injury. On 18 March 2026, Oxborough returned to Dunfermline Athletic on loan for the remainder of the season after Connelly had recovered from his injury.

== Career statistics ==
As of match played 7 April 2026

Appearances and goals by club, season and competition
Club	Season	League			National cup (Note: Includes FA Cup, Scottish Cup)		League cup (Note: Includes EFL Cup, Scottish League Cup)		Other		Total	
Club	Season	Division	Apps	Goals	Apps	Goals	Apps	Goals	Apps	Goals	Apps	Goals
Norwich City U23	2016-17	—			—		—		0	0	0	0
Norwich City	2018-19	Championship	0	0	0	0	0	0	—		0	0
Wealdstone (loan)	2019–20	National League South	22	0	2	0	—		0	0	24	0
Barnet (loan)	2021-22	National League	22	0	1	0	—		1 (Note: Appearance(s) in FA Trophy)	0	24	0
Motherwell	2022-23	Scottish Premiership	0	0	0	0	0	0	—		0	0
Motherwell	2023-24	Scottish Premiership	0	0	0	0	2	0	—		2	0
Motherwell	2024-25	Scottish Premiership	25	0	0	0	5	0	—		30	0
Motherwell	2025-26	Scottish Premiership	0	0	0	0	2	0	—		2	0
Motherwell	Total		25	0	0	0	7	0	—		32	0
Dunfermline Athletic (loan)	2025-26	Scottish Championship	6	0	1	0	0	0	—		7	0
Career total			75	0	4	0	7	0	1	0	87	0
