= Dunfermline Athletic F.C. =

Association football club in Dunfermline, Scotland

Dunfermline Athletic
- Full name: Dunfermline Athletic Football Club
- Nickname: The Pars
- Founded: 2 June 1885; 141 years ago
- Ground: East End Park
- Capacity: 11,480
- Owner: Park Bench SFC LLC
- Chairman: Jim Leishman
- Manager: Neil Lennon
- League: Scottish Championship
- 2025–26: Scottish Championship, 4th of 10
- Website: dafc.co.uk
Home colours	Away colours

Dunfermline Athletic Football Club is a Scottish professional football club based in the city of Dunfermline, Fife. Founded in 1885, the club currently compete in the Scottish Championship after winning the 2022–23 Scottish League One title. Nicknamed The Pars, Dunfermline play at East End Park.

The Pars' most successful period was in the 1960s, when the side won the Scottish Cup twice, in 1961 and 1968 under the management of Jock Stein and George Farm respectively. The club regularly played European football in this period, reaching the semi-finals of the 1968–69 European Cup Winners' Cup under Farm.

The club have played at East End Park since their formation in 1885; however, the pitch they initially played on – also known as East End Park – was slightly west of the present stadium.

After a period of relative success in the 2000s marked by appearances in three major finals (the 2004 Scottish Cup Final, the 2006 Scottish League Cup Final and the 2007 Scottish Cup Final), all of which were lost against Celtic, Dunfermline were relegated to the First Division in 2007. The club then encountered financial problems and, in April 2013, applied for and was granted full administration at the Court of Session in Edinburgh, and in October 2013, the fan group Pars United assumed control of the club.

== History ==
=== Beginning (1885–1959) ===
Chart of yearly table positions of Dunfermline in the Scottish League.

Dunfermline Football Club was formed in 1874, when members of Dunfermline Cricket Club decided to establish a football section, with the intention of maintaining fitness during the winter. A dispute over club membership caused some members to split away from Dunfermline Cricket Club, which resulted in the creation of Dunfermline Athletic Football Club on 2 June 1885. The club became the principal football club in Dunfermline and their first twenty-five years saw them compete primarily as an amateur team, until they turned professional in 1899. The club first entered into the Scottish Football League in 1912 where they took part in the Scottish Division Two. The fifty years following the club's admittance to the SFL saw little success, with the side most frequently playing in the second tier, with occasional appearances in the top flight.

=== Stein and Farm (1960–1970) ===
Dunfermline's finest period came during the sixties. After being appointed manager on 14 March 1960 and saving the club from relegation to Scottish Division Two, Jock Stein – in his first managerial appointment – guided the Pars to their first major piece of silverware, winning the Scottish Cup in 1961 after just thirteen months in charge.

The years which followed saw Dunfermline consistently competing in European competitions, reaching the semi-finals of the 1968–69 European Cup Winners' Cup under George Farm. Although they lost by one goal on aggregate to eventual winners Slovan Bratislava, it remains the greatest achievement in Dunfermline's history. This followed Farm managing Dunfermline to their second Scottish Cup victory, winning the competition in 1968.

=== Norrie and the Masterton era (1971–2012) ===
After a period of decline during the 1970s and much of the 1980s, the club returned to the top tier in 1987 under club legend Jim Leishman, although they were subsequently relegated after just one season. The following years saw a similar pattern, with a handful of promotions and relegations throughout the 1990s. It was during this period that the club were rocked by the loss of club captain Norrie McCathie, who died on 8 January 1996 by carbon monoxide poisoning.

The appointment of John Yorkston as chairman and the involvement of Gavin Masterton in 1999 saw the club enter a period of resurgence, with two Scottish Cup final appearances in 2004 and 2007, a Scottish League Cup final in 2006, as well as two short-lived excursions in the UEFA Cup in 2004 and 2007. In 2012 it emerged that the club had a number of outstanding tax bills with HMRC following the financial mismanagement of the football club by Yorkston and Masterton. The club were put into administration on 11 April 2013 and after a points deduction, were relegated to the third tier for the first time since 1986.

=== Fan ownership and German investment (2013–2024) ===
Following relegation to Scottish League One and with a depleted squad, Jim Jefferies remained as manager and achieved a comfortable second-place finish behind a Rangers team climbing the divisions following their own administration and multiple relegations two years prior.

The club were officially taken over by fans owned group Pars United in October 2013, including the full ownership of the club's East End Park. Pars United's Bob Garmory was appointed the club's interim chairman and was joined on the board by Jim Leishman, Ian Hunter, Kip McBay, Craig McWhirter and Margaret Ross. Eventually Ross McArthur would become the club's new long standing chairman.

Jefferies' side eventually failed to win promotion through the playoffs and he resigned in December of the following season. The club stumbled to a 7th-place finish under John Potter but the squad was in a much stronger position and Allan Johnston lead the Pars to the League One title by an 18-point margin in 2015. This period in the club's history saw the arrival of fan favourites such as Faissal El Bakhtaoui, Andy Geggan and a returning Joe Cardle.

Club legend and former striker Stevie Crawford was appointed head coach in January 2019 following a restructure that introduced other former players Jackie McNamara as technical consultant and Greg Shields as assistant head coach. Crawford resigned after two and a half seasons and was replaced by Peter Grant, who would become the manager with the lowest win percentage in the club's long history. John "Yogi" Hughes replaced Grant after five months and with the club bottom of the Scottish Championship he failed to turn around the team's fortunes, with the Pars once again relegated to League One.

In September 2020 and at the height of the COVID 19 pandemic, Dunfermline announced that a group of four German investors had agreed to purchase a minority share in the club with the intention to eventually be the majority owners. The investors, led by former St. Pauli manager Thomas Meggle joined the club's board with Meggle also naming himself Director of Football. Ross McArthur retired as chairman and the German outfit brought in former Manchester City and Nottingham Forest executive David Cook to serve as CEO and eventual chairman.

Work started on re-establishing the club's own in-house youth academy and the purchase of the former Rosyth Civil Service Club was made to develop state-of-the-art training facilities. Work stalled due to pandemic related construction cost increases and a fading interest from the German investors who had still not taken up the commitment to purchase the majority shares they had previously agreed to buy. Relations between the club and the fans began to sour due to a perceived lack of investment in the squad and the manager and in August 2024 the Germans announced their intention to sell their shares in the club after four years in charge.

Dunfermline appointed former Dundee boss James McPake as manager on a two-year deal following relegation to League One, with Dave Mackay joining as assistant. McPake brought instant success with the Pars winning the league by 14 points and losing only one league game all season. After struggling to compete in the Championship amid the ongoing sale of the club, McPake was dismissed at Christmas 2024.

=== American takeover and "a new era" (2025–present) ===
January 2025 saw a deal finalised for American-based outfit Park Bench SFC LLC to buy the club, with former poker star James Bord & business partner Evan Sofer named co-owners. The Las Vegas based duo cited their desire to utilise their backgrounds in data analytics and artificial intelligence to realise the club's "immense potential". Already owning a minority stake in Spanish Segunda División side Córdoba CF and Bulgarian outfit PFC Septemvri Sofia, Park Bench LLC acquired 99.84% of Dunfermline. The club's social media profiles quickly replaced the "Living True Sportsmanship" motto of the previous German owners with tag lines of "a new era".

The new owners first act was to fill the head coach vacancy by appointing Fife neighbours Kelty Hearts manager Michael Tidser on a two and a half year deal. With the team failing to score in eight out of eleven games and stuck in ninth place in the Championship, Tidser was sacked on 17 March after only two months in charge. On 21 March 2025, the club appointed former Celtic and Hibernian manager Neil Lennon on a short-term deal until the end of the season. Lennon signed former UEFA Champions League finalist and Kenyan international Victor Wanyama until the end of the season. Wanyama made his debut from the bench against Ayr United on 29 March 2025 and was sent off after 20 minutes following a deliberate handball.

After confirming the club's Championship status with a 7th-place finish, Lennon signed a two-year deal to remain as manager.

== Colours and badge ==
For much of Dunfermline's history their home colours have been black and white striped shirts, with black shorts and black socks, though recently they have worn white shorts and white socks. From the club's formation in 1885 until 1901, the club's home colours were a plain maroon shirt with either navy or white shorts and either maroon, white or grey socks. The club then went through a period between 1901 and 1909 when their kits were blue. The club first wore their now well-known black-and-white-striped shirts in 1909 and have worn these colours every year apart from the 1971–72 season, when they wore all white, the 2004–05 season, when they wore a white shirt with a single black stripe running down the left side of the shirt and during the 2007–08 season, in which they wore an all-white shirt with black shorts and white socks. For the 2008–09 season, the Pars reverted to their well-known black-and-white stripes resembling the kit they wore for the 1997–98 and 1998–99 seasons.

Conversely, there has been no consistent colour or design of the club's away strips. Since the start of the new millennium, the club have most regularly had red kits of varying design; for example, the 2004–2005 away strip consisted of vertical red and black lines, whereas the 2016–17 kit was mostly red, with four horizontal lines of red, white and black across the chest. However, away kit designs have not been exclusively red, with the club having also had kits of purple, blue and yellow, as well as black, as was the case during the 2005–06 season.

Period	Kit manufacturer	Front of Shirt sponsor
1977–1980	(England) Bukta	none
1980–1983	(England) Bukta	Braisby Roofing
1983–1986	(England) Bukta	Rennie
1986–1988	(England) Umbro	Aluglaze
1988–1989	(England) Umbro	Thomson's World of Furniture
1989–1992	(England) Umbro	Landmark
1992–1994	(Denmark) Hummel	Landmark
1994–1996	(England) Matchwinner	Landmark
1996–1997	(France) Le Coq Sportif	Landmark
1997–1999	(England) Avec	Landmark
1999–2000	(England) Avec	Auto Windscreens
2000–2001	(England) TFG	Auto Windscreens
2001–2005	(England) TFG	RAC Auto Windscreens
2005–2007	(England) TFG	The Purvis Group
2007–2008	(Germany) Adidas	The Purvis Group
2008–2012	(Germany) Puma	The Purvis Group
2012–2015	(Spain) Joma	The Purvis Group
2015–2023	(Spain) Joma	SRJ Windows
2023–2025	(Italy) Erreà	SRJ Windows
2025-	(Italy) Erreà	Gamdom.News

The current Dunfermline Athletic club badge design was created in 1957 by Colin Dymock, an art teacher at Dunfermline High School. It was allegedly inspired by one of Dymock's mysterious nightmares. The "DAFC" represents the initials of the club, Dunfermline Athletic Football Club, whilst the tower is a representation of Malcolm Canmore's Tower. The tower was adopted by the town of Dunfermline to be used for the Burgh Arms and old seals. Malcolm Canmore was King of Scotland from 1057 to 1093, and made his residence in Dunfermline within what is now Pittencrieff Park. The park is represented by the stormy, ghostly blue and black night scene behind the tower, including the park's infamous hanging tree. The green area at the bottom of the crest is meant to represent the club's stadium, East End Park. Whilst the badge has been in use since the 1950s, it has undergone a number of alterations since its original incarnation, with the most recent adjustments in 2011 altering the outlines, font and colours of the logo.

== Nickname ==
According to Black and White Magic, a 1984 book about the club by Jim Paterson and Douglas Scott, there are numerous theories as to the origin of the club's nickname, the Pars. The authors wrote:

"Most tend to confirm the more common belief that the name arose from the team's parallel striped shirts, their drinking habits or their style of play. The latter were both described as "paralytic". The earliest theory claims that in the early days when the Football Club was closely connected with the Cricket Club, the footballers were renowned for their performances at the bar and so were called the "Paralytics".

However, in the early 1900s it is known that Athletic's nickname was the "Dumps" – shortened from Dunfermline – and this is said to have been coined by English sailors visiting East End Park when their ship docked at Rosyth. After World War I they were known as the Pars and some believe the parallel black and white stripes to be the reason. Another school of thought involves English workers who came to work at the armaments depot at Crombie and at Rosyth Dockyard; they kept their association with their local team by forming the Plymouth Argyle (Rosyth) Supporters Club and it is said that the Dunfermline nickname comes from the banners in evidence around the ground."

Another view, which holds water with the older supporters is that the name derives from the word 'Parr' which is a juvenile salmon with dark vertical markings.

== Club culture ==
=== Songs ===
Like other football clubs, Dunfermline has a number of songs and anthems. A popular song, and the anthem to which the team runs out is "Into The Valley" by local band the Skids. Since the 1950s the crowd have left the ground after the game to the tune of "The Bluebell Polka" by Jimmy Shand and his band. After Dunfermline score a goal at East End Park, the chorus of the Dave Clark Five's Glad All Over is played.

=== Rivalries ===
Dunfermline Athletic have traditional rivalries with local sides Cowdenbeath and Raith Rovers as well as contesting the Kincardine Derby with near neighbours, Falkirk. They have also participated regularly in the Fife Cup since their formation in 1885, winning the competition more than thirty times, most recently during the 2018–19 season.

=== In popular culture ===
In the STV detective drama Taggart, writer Stuart Hepburn (a Dunfermline Athletic fan) used the names of the 1968 Scottish Cup-winning side for the characters in a 2003 episode.

=== Hall of Fame ===
The club launched its Hall of Fame in 2004, initially with nine inductees. 50 individuals (ranging from players and managers to kit managers and the club historian) and two team groups (the 1960s cup winners) were members as of 2019.

== Notable managers and players ==
=== Notable managers ===
- George Farm; FA Cup winner in 1953 with Blackpool; Scotland international goalkeeper who managed Dunfermline to their highest achievement, the semi-finals of the European Cup Winners' Cup during the 1968–69 season.
- Jim Leishman; former player, manager and current chairman of the club, also Provost of Fife.
- Jock Stein; former manager of the club and former manager of Celtic and the Scotland national team.

=== Notable players ===
- Sol Bamba; former player (39 league matches), and Ivory Coast international with 46 caps.
- Willie Callaghan; former player (286 league appearances), and Scotland international (6 caps).
- Owen Coyle; former player (47 matches, 10 goals), Republic of Ireland international, former manager of Queen's Park, Bolton Wanderers, Wigan Athletic, Houston Dynamo and Blackburn Rovers.
- Stevie Crawford; former player (203 matches, 55 goals), and Scotland international (25 caps).
- Alex Ferguson; former player (89 matches, 66 goals), and former manager of Aberdeen and Manchester United.
- Norrie McCathie; former player (495 league appearances); club captain who played for Dunfermline Athletic for 15 years. Died whilst with the club and has a stand at East End Park stadium named after him.
- David Moyes; former player (105 matches, 13 goals), current manager of Everton, former manager of Manchester United, Real Sociedad, Sunderland, and West Ham United.
- Barry Nicholson; former player (174 matches, 21 goals), and Scotland international (3 caps).
- Andrius Skerla; former player (169 league matches), and Lithuania international (84 caps).

== Players ==
=== First-team squad ===
As of 3 September 2026

Note: Flags indicate national team as defined under FIFA eligibility rules; some limited exceptions apply. Players may hold more than one non-FIFA nationality.

No.	Pos.	Nation	Player
1	GK	ENG	Aston Oxborough
2	DF	IRL	Freddie Turley (on loan from Derby County)
3	DF	SCO	John Tod
5	DF	SCO	Luke Robinson
6	DF	GHA	Nurudeen Abdulai
7	FW	SCO	Callumn Morrison
8	MF	SCO	Charlie Gilmour (captain)
9	FW	SCO	Zak Rudden
10	FW	SCO	Oli Shaw
11	DF	NIR	Shea Kearney
12	GK	GAM	Musa Dibaga
14	MF	MOZ	Alfons Amade
15	DF	SCO	Samuel Cleall-Harding (on loan from Dundee United)
16	FW	SCO	Rory MacLeod

No.	Pos.	Nation	Player
17	FW	ENG	Olly Thomas
18	MF	IRL	Kian Corbally
19	MF	UGA	Allan Oyirwoth (on loan from New England Revolution)
20	FW	SCO	Chris Kane
22	MF	SCO	Keith Bray
24	DF	SCO	Dylan Lobban (on loan from Aberdeen)
25	DF	NIR	Aaron Donnelly (on loan from Dundee)
26	MF	SCO	Andrew Tod
33	MF	SCO	Josh Cooper
36	GK	SCO	Thomas Margetts
38	MF	SCO	James Hardie
40	GK	ENG	Billy Terrell
47	DF	SCO	Robbie Fraser (vice-captain)
99	FW	NGR	Olamilekan Adams

=== On loan ===
Note: Flags indicate national team as defined under FIFA eligibility rules; some limited exceptions apply. Players may hold more than one non-FIFA nationality.

No.	Pos.	Nation	Player
21	MF	SCO	Zeke Cameron (co-operation loan with Stirling Albion)
23	DF	SCO	Alasdair Davidson (on loan at Kelty Hearts)
28	DF	SCO	Ewan McLeod (on loan at East Fife)
29	FW	SCO	Jake Sutherland (on loan at Montrose)
30	MF	SCO	Freddie Rowe (on loan at Edinburgh City)

No.	Pos.	Nation	Player
31	FW	ENG	Travion Jackson (on loan at Dundonald Bluebell)
32	MF	SCO	Struan McLeod (on loan at Dundonald Bluebell)
34	FW	SCO	Lucas Fyfe (co-operation loan with Stirling Albion)
35	FW	SCO	Callum Shearer (on loan at Kirkintilloch Rob Roy)
37	MF	SCO	Danny Dobbie (co-operation loan with Stirling Albion)

=== Club captains since 1985 ===
Period	Captain	Vice-captain
1985–1988	(Scotland) Bobby Robertson	
1988–1996	(Scotland) Norrie McCathie	
1996–1998	(Scotland) Craig Robertson	
1998–1999	(Scotland) Andy Smith	
1999–2000	(Scotland) Andy Tod	
2000–2002	(Scotland) Ian Ferguson	(Scotland) Scott M. Thomson
2002–2007	(Scotland) Scott M. Thomson	
2007–2009	(Scotland) Scott Wilson	(Scotland) Stephen Glass
2009–2010	(Scotland) Stephen Glass	
2010–2012	(Scotland) Austin McCann	
2012–2013	(Scotland) Jordan McMillan	(England) Josh Falkingham
2013–2014	(England) Josh Falkingham (Scotland) Andy Geggan	(England) Josh Falkingham
2014–2015	(England) Josh Falkingham	(Scotland) Gregor Buchanan
2015–2017	(Scotland) Callum Fordyce^{[note 1]} & (Scotland) Andy Geggan	
2017–2018	(Republic of Ireland) Callum Morris	(Scotland) Sean Murdoch
2018–2019	(Scotland) Lee Ashcroft	
2019–2020	(Northern Ireland) Paul Paton	(Scotland) Lee Ashcroft
2020–2021	(Scotland) Euan Murray	(Scotland) Ryan Dow
2021–2022	(Scotland) Graham Dorrans	
2022–2026	(Scotland) Kyle Benedictus	(Scotland) Chris Hamilton
2026–Present	(Scotland) Charlie Gilmour	(Scotland) Robbie Fraser

^{note 1} Fordyce was initially appointed club captain for the 2015–16 season, however, after suffering a severe leg-break in September 2015, Andy Geggan was given the captain's armband for the remainder of the season. The two are considered co-captains for the season, with both having lifted the Scottish League One trophy together at the end of the season.

== Management ==
=== Club officials ===
==== Backroom staff ====
As of 1 July 2026

Position	Name
Manager	Neil Lennon
Assistant managers	Iain Brunskill; Kevin McDonald
Goalkeeping coach	Andrew Collier
Football operations manager	Gary Montignani
Development coach	Kyle Benedictus
Club doctor	Dr Paul Grealis
Physiotherapist	Gregor Pirie
Head of performance	Steve Curnyn
Senior sports scientist	Euan Donaldson
Sports therapist	Euan Heeps
Sports therapist	Alan Richmond
Kitman	Liam Murphy
Kit coordinator	Sammi Connell

==== Board of directors ====
As of 1 July 2026

Position	Name
Chairman	Jim Leishman
Chief executive officer	David Cook
Director	James Bord
Director	Alsharif Faisal Bin Jamil
Director	Ian Laing
Director	Drew Main
Director	Evan Sofer

== Honours ==
=== Major honours ===
- Scottish Cup:
  - Winners (2): 1960–61, 1967–68
  - Runners-up (4): 1964–65, 2003–04, 2006–07, 2025–26
- Scottish League Cup:
  - Runners-up (3): 1949–50, 1991–92, 2005–06

=== Minor honours ===
- Scottish Championship, second tier:
  - Champions (4): 1925–26, 1988–89, 1995–96, 2010–11
  - Runners-up (9): 1912–13, 1933–34, 1954–55, 1957–58, 1972–73, 1986–87, 1993–94, 1994–95, 1999–2000
- Scottish League One, third tier:
  - Champions (3): 1985–86, 2015–16, 2022–23
  - Runners-up (2): 1978–79, 2013–14
- Scottish Challenge Cup:
  - Runners-up (1): 2007–08

=== Club records ===
- Highest home attendance: 27,816 vs Celtic, 30 April 1968
- Highest home European attendance: 26,000 vs West Bromwich Albion, European Cup Winners' Cup quarter-finals, 15 January 1969
- Biggest league win: 11–2 vs. Stenhousemuir, 1930
- Biggest league defeat: 10–0 vs. Dundee, 22 March 1947
- Biggest all-time defeat: 17–2 vs. Clackmannan, Midland League, 1891
- Most capped player: Andrius Skerla, 84 for Lithuania 2000–2005
- Most appearances: Norrie McCathie, 576 (497 league), 1981–1996
- Most career goals: Charlie Dickson, 212 (154 league), 1955–1964
- Record transfer fee paid: £540,000 to Bordeaux for Istvan Kozma, 9 August 1989
- Record transfer fee received: £650,000 from Celtic for Jackie McNamara, 4 October 1995

== See also ==
- McCrae's Battalion
