= 2025–26 Raith Rovers F.C. season =

Raith Rovers
2025–26 season
- Chairman: Colin Smart (interim until 25/03/26); John Sim (interim from 30/03/26 to present)
- Manager: Barry Robson (until 11 November); Paul Hanlon (interim player/manager); Dougie Imrie (from 25 November)
- Stadium: Stark's Park
- Championship: 5th
- Scottish Cup: 4th Round
- League Cup: Group Stage
- Challenge Cup: Winners
- Top goalscorer: League: Dylan Easton (8 goals); All: Dylan Easton (17 goals)
- Highest home attendance: 6,773
- Lowest home attendance: 596
- Average home league attendance: 3,794
Home colours	Away colours	Third colours

The 2025–26 season was Raith Rovers' sixth season back in the second tier of Scottish football after being promoted from Scottish League One at the end of the 2019–20 season. Raith Rovers also competed in the League Cup, Challenge Cup and the Scottish Cup.

== Summary ==
=== Management ===
Raith were led by manager Barry Robson until the 11th of November when he was relived of his duties after a poor run of form..

== Results & fixtures ==
Win Draw Loss Postponed

=== Friendlies ===
28 June 2025 Friendly	Linlithgow Rose	2–1	Raith Rovers	Prestonfield
14:00	McMartin 78'; Maguire 83'	Raith Report	Vaughan 17'	Referee: Iain Snedden

1 July 2025 Friendly	Raith Rovers	4–1	Alloa Athletic	Stark's Park
19:45	Vaughan 6'; Chin 44'; Rowe 53'; Mullin 70'	Raith Report	Trialist 84'	Referee: Alastair Grieve

5 July 2025 Friendly	Falkirk	4–2	Raith Rovers	Falkirk Stadium
14:00	Ross 41'; Graham 59'; Spencer 80'; MacIver 83'	Raith Report	Vaughan 36'; Doherty 69'	Attendance: 1,204; Referee: Ross Hardie

=== Scottish Championship ===
2 August 2025 1	Raith Rovers	1–1	Queen's Park	Stark's Park
15:00	Easton 81' (pen.)	Raith Report	Ruth 10' (pen.)	Attendance: 3,391; Referee: Duncan Nicolson

9 August 2025 2	Ayr United	0–1	Raith Rovers	Somerset Park
15:00		Raith Report	Easton 1'	Attendance: 2,570; Referee: Kevin Clancy

22 August 2025 3	Raith Rovers	2–0	Dunfermline Athletic	Stark's Park
19:45	Stevenson 2'; Vaughan 78'	Raith Report		Attendance: 6,511; Referee: David Dickinson

30 August 2025 4	Partick Thistle	3–2	Raith Rovers	Firhill Stadium
15:00	Watt 7'; Fitzpatrick 13'; Chalmers 75'	Raith Report	Easton 22' (pen.); Matthews 36'	Attendance: 3,871; Referee: Peter Stuart

6 September 2025 5	Greenock Morton	0–1	Raith Rovers	Cappielow
15:00		Raith Report	Easton 52'	Attendance: 2,004; Referee: Lloyd Wilson

13 September 2025 6	Raith Rovers	0–2	St Johnstone	Stark's Park
15:00		Raith Report	Sidibeh 29'; McPake 88'	Attendance: 5,163; Referee: Chris Graham

20 September 2025 7	Airdrieonians	0–0	Raith Rovers	Excelsior Stadium
15:00		Raith Report		Attendance: 1,502; Referee: Ryan Lee

27 September 2025 8	Raith Rovers	3–0	Arbroath	Stark's Park
15:00	Hanlon 47'; Chin 65'; Hamilton 88'	Raith Report		Attendance: 3,323; Referee: Grant Irvine

4 October 2025 9	Ross County	2–0	Raith Rovers	Victoria Park
15:00	Thomson 73'; Hale 90'	Raith Report		Attendance: 2,675; Referee: Colin Steven

11 October 2025 10	Raith Rovers	0–2	Ayr United	Stark's Park
15:00		Raith Report	McKenzie 12'; Murphy 32' (pen.)	Attendance: 3,448; Referee: Duncan Nicolson

17 October 2025 11	Dunfermline Athletic	2–0	Raith Rovers	East End Park
19:45	Stewart 19'; Kane 79'	Raith Report		Attendance: 6,753; Referee: Nick Walsh

25 October 2025 12	Raith Rovers	2–0	Partick Thistle	Stark's Park
15:00	Easton 55'; Hanlon 67'	Raith Report		Attendance: 3,776; Referee: Grant Irvine

1 November 2025 13	Raith Rovers	1–1	Greenock Morton	Stark's Park
15:00	Hamilton 39'	Raith Report	Moore 90'	Attendance: 3,141; Referee: Colin Steven

8 November 2025 14	Queen's Park	2–1	Raith Rovers	Lesser Hampden
15:00	Fowler 13', 78'	Raith Report	O'Connor 22'	Attendance: 867; Referee: Calum Scott

15 November 2025 15	Raith Rovers	0–3	Airdrieonians	Stark's Park
15:00		Raith Report	Gallagher 38'; Henderson 53'; Mochrie 63'	Attendance: 3,331; Referee: Lloyd Wilson

22 November 2025 16	Arbroath	0–0	Raith Rovers	Gayfield Park
15:00		Raith Report		Attendance: 1,688; Referee: Chris Graham

6 December 2025 17	St Johnstone	0–0	Raith Rovers	McDiarmid Park
15:00		Raith Report		Attendance: 4,113; Referee: Lloyd Wilson

13 December 2025 18	Raith Rovers	6–0	Ross County	Stark's Park
15:00	Brown 8'; Easton 14' (pen.), 49'; Rowe 37'; Nsio 77'; Hamilton 83'	Raith Report		Attendance: 3,001; Referee: Matthew MacDermid

20 December 2025 19	Partick Thistle	0–0	Raith Rovers	Firhill Stadium
15:00		Raith Report		Attendance: 3,682; Referee: Ross Hardie

27 December 2025 20	Raith Rovers	1–2	Dunfermline Athletic	Stark's Park
15:00	Easton 60' (pen.)	Raith Report	A.Tod 33'; Stewart 41'	Attendance: 6,773; Referee: Dan McFarlane

3 January 2026 21	Airdrieonians	0–0	Raith Rovers	Excelsior Stadium
15:00		Raith Report		Attendance: 1,564; Referee: Peter Stuart

10 January 2026 22	Raith Rovers	2–3	Arbroath	Stark's Park
15:00	Brown 52'; Mullin 68'	Raith Report	Reilly 28'; Mebude 45'; Robinson 81'	Attendance: 3,108; Referee: Duncan Nicolson

24 January 2026 23	Raith Rovers	4–1	Queen's Park	Stark's Park
15:00	Hamilton 39', 64', 69'; Mullin 45'	Raith Report	Drozd 76'	Attendance: 3,002; Referee: Colin Steven

31 January 2026 24	Ayr United	2–1	Raith Rovers	Somerset Park
15:00	Dempsey 28'; Dowds 57'	Raith Report	Vaughan 77'	Attendance: 2,062; Referee: Ross Hardie

14 February 2026 25	Greenock Morton	0–0	Raith Rovers	Cappielow
15:00		Raith Report		Attendance: 1,798; Referee: Iain Snedden

20 February 2026 26	Raith Rovers	0–0	St Johnstone	Stark's Park
19:45		Raith Report		Attendance: 4,121; Referee: Ross Hardie

28 February 2026 27	Ross County	2–0	Raith Rovers	Victoria Park
15:00	White 33'; Ikpeazu 43'	Raith Report		Attendance: 2,903; Referee: Lloyd Wilson

14 March 2026 29	Dunfermline Athletic	3–0	Raith Rovers	East End Park
15:00	Morrison 27'; Kane 90'; A.Tod 90'	Raith Report		Attendance: 6,605; Referee: Matthew MacDermid

21 March 2026 30	Raith Rovers	3–1	Airdrieonians	Stark's Park
15:00	Cameron 64'; Montagu 77', 85'	Raith Report	Devine 54'	Attendance: 3,218; Referee: Chris Graham

24 March 2026 28	Raith Rovers	0–2	Partick Thistle	Stark's Park
19:45		Raith Report	McPherson 40'; Fitzpatrick 90'	Attendance: 3,422; Referee: Dan McFarlane

27 March 2026 31	Raith Rovers	3–0	Ayr United	Stark's Park
19:45	Cameron 6', 60'; Chin 67'	Raith Report		Attendance: 3,113; Referee: Colin Steven

11 April 2026 33	Raith Rovers	3–2	Greenock Morton	Stark's Park
15:00	Nsio 60'; Cameron 66'; Doherty 84'	Raith Report	Blues 44'; Shaw 74'	Attendance: 3,132; Referee: Lloyd Wilson

14 April 2026 32	Queen's Park	0–2	Raith Rovers	Lesser Hampden
19:45		Raith Report	Vaughan 39' (pen.), 55'	Attendance: 788; Referee: Kevin Clancy

18 April 2026 34	Arbroath	2–1	Raith Rovers	Gayfield Park
15:00	MacIntyre 45'; Marshall 83'	Raith Report	Montagu 90'	Attendance: 2,044; Referee: Nick Walsh

24 April 2026 35	St Johnstone	2–0	Raith Rovers	McDiarmid Park
19:45	Gullan 21' (pen.), 41'	Raith Report		Attendance: 7,729; Referee: Dan McFarlane

1 May 2026 36	Raith Rovers	3–2	Ross County	Stark's Park
19:45	Cameron 76'; Hamilton 80'; Mullin 90' (pen.)	Raith Report	Phillips 16'; Carbon 90'	Attendance: 3,309; Referee: Duncan Nicolson

=== Scottish League Cup ===
12 July 2025 Group F	Elgin City	1–5	Raith Rovers	Borough Briggs
15:00	Murray 54'	Raith Report	Easton 10' (pen.), 60' (pen.); Rowe 37'; Vaughan 38'; Mullin 72'	Attendance: 1,025; Referee: Sean Murdoch

15 July 2025 Group F	Raith Rovers	2–4	East Kilbride	Stark's Park
19:45	Rowe 69'; Vaughan 87'	Raith Report	Healy 48'; Robertson 89', 90' (pen.), 90'	Attendance: 1,728; Referee: Iain Sneddon

22 July 2025 Group F	St Johnstone	3–1	Raith Rovers	McDiarmid Park
19:45	Gullan 27'; McPake 51'; Kirk 80'	Raith Report	Hamilton 57'	Attendance: 3,358; Referee: Greg Soutar

26 July 2025 Group F	Raith Rovers	5–1	Inverness Caledonian Thistle	Stark's Park
15:00	Easton 5', 7' (pen.), 64' (pen.); Hamilton 36'; Savage 90' (o.g.)	Raith Report	Wotherspoon 58'	Attendance: 1,032; Referee: Ross Hardie

=== Scottish Challenge Cup ===
9 December 2025 Round 2	Raith Rovers	5–2	Hamilton Academical	Stark's Park
19:45	O'Connor 5'; Brown 51'; Rowe 58', 81', 87'	Raith Report	Cameron 40', 79'	Attendance: 596; Referee: Graham Grainger

6 January 2026 Round 3	Raith Rovers	1–0	Queen of the South	Stark's Park
19:45	Easton 37' (pen.)	Raith Report		Attendance: 854; Referee: Josh Hay

27 January 2026 Quarter-Final	Queen's Park	1–1 (1–3 p)	Raith Rovers	Lesser Hampden
19:45	Fowler 73'	Raith Report	Nsio 32'	Attendance: 524; Referee: Sean Murdoch
	Penalties
	Savoury (penalty scored); Drozd (penalty missed); Connolly (penalty missed); MacGregor (penalty missed)		Brown (penalty missed); Mullin (penalty scored); McMullan (penalty scored); Doherty (penalty scored)

25 February 2026 Semi-Final	Airdrieonians	1–1 (3–5 p)	Raith Rovers	Excelsior Stadium
19:45	Hastie 88'	Raith Report	Easton 56'	Referee: Sean Murdoch
	Penalties
	Stirton (penalty scored); Mochrie (penalty scored); McGrattan (penalty missed); Hastie (penalty scored)		Mullin (penalty scored); Hanlon (penalty scored); Matthews (penalty scored); Rowe (penalty scored); Cameron (penalty scored)

5 April 2026 Final	Raith Rovers	4–1	Inverness Caledonian Thistle	Firhill Stadium
16:10	Cameron 29', 55'; Easton 60', 69'	Raith Report	Stewart 37'	Attendance: 4,812; Referee: Ryan Lee

=== Scottish Cup ===
29 November 2025 Round 3	Raith Rovers	1–0	Alloa Athletic	Stark's Park
15:00	Doherty 29'	Raith Report		Attendance: 1,405; Referee: Ross Hardie

18 January 2026 Round 4	Aberdeen	1–0	Raith Rovers	Pittodrie Stadium
14:30	Milne 9'	Raith Report		Attendance: 9,525; Referee: Kevin Clancy

== Player statistics ==
=== Squad ===
Last updated 1 May 2026

No.	Pos	Nat	Player	Total		Championship		League Cup		Scottish Cup		Challenge Cup	
No.	Pos	Nat	Player	Apps	Goals	Apps	Goals	Apps	Goals	Apps	Goals	Apps	Goals
1	GK	(Scotland) SCO	Josh Rae	46	0	36+0	0	4+0	0	2+0	0	4+0	0
2	DF	(England) ENG	Jai Rowe	35	6	20+5	1	4+0	2	1+1	0	3+1	3
3	DF	(Scotland) SCO	Ewan Wilson	20	0	9+5	0	0+0	0	1+1	0	3+1	0
4	DF	(Scotland) SCO	Paul Hanlon	42	2	30+2	2	4+0	0	2+0	0	4+0	0
5	DF	(Scotland) SCO	Callum Fordyce	22	0	17+0	0	4+0	0	0+0	0	1+0	0
6	DF	(Republic of Ireland) IRL	Darragh O'Connor	30	2	22+1	1	0+0	0	2+0	0	5+0	1
7	DF	(Malaysia) MAS	Richard Chin	27	2	1+19	2	0+3	0	0+0	0	0+4	0
8	MF	(Scotland) SCO	Ross Matthews	41	1	26+5	1	3+1	0	0+2	0	3+1	0
9	FW	(Scotland) SCO	Jack Hamilton	40	9	23+6	7	1+3	2	2+0	0	3+2	0
10	FW	(Scotland) SCO	Lewis Vaughan	25	6	11+7	4	3+1	2	0+1	0	1+1	0
11	FW	(Scotland) SCO	Innes Cameron	11	7	8+1	5	0+0	0	0+0	0	1+1	2
14	MF	(Scotland) SCO	Josh Mullin	41	3	15+15	2	2+2	1	2+0	0	1+4	0
17	FW	(Scotland) SCO	Lewis Gibson	5	0	0+2	0	0+2	0	0+0	0	0+1	0
18	FW	(Scotland) SCO	Paul McMullan	31	0	17+5	0	4+0	0	1+1	0	0+3	0
19	FW	(Scotland) SCO	Andy Winter	17	0	7+6	0	0+0	0	1+0	0	3+0	0
20	MF	(Scotland) SCO	Scott Brown	42	3	28+3	2	4+0	0	2+0	0	3+2	1
21	MF	(Scotland) SCO	Shaun Byrne	13	0	8+3	0	1+1	0	0+0	0	0+0	0
22	DF	(Republic of Ireland) IRL	Jordan Doherty	41	2	30+1	1	4+0	0	2+0	1	3+1	0
23	MF	(Scotland) SCO	Dylan Easton	47	17	36+0	8	4+0	5	2+0	0	4+1	4
24	GK	(Scotland) SCO	Aidan Glavin	1	0	0+0	0	0+0	0	0+0	0	1+0	0
25	MF	(Scotland) SCO	Kai Montagu	26	3	5+12	3	0+4	0	0+1	0	2+2	0
26	DF	(Scotland) SCO	Lewis Stevenson	34	1	27+2	1	2+0	0	1+0	0	2+0	0
27	DF	(Scotland) SCO	Callum Hannah	0	0	0+0	0	0+0	0	0+0	0	0+0	0
29	MF	(England) ENG	Paul Nsio	31	3	18+6	2	0+0	0	1+1	0	5+0	1
30	MF	(Scotland) SCO	Logan Raeside	0	0	0+0	0	0+0	0	0+0	0	0+0	0
Players who left during the season who made an appearance
11	FW	(Scotland) SCO	Callum Smith	8	0	1+5	0	0+0	0	0+1	0	1+0	0
19	FW	(Wales) WAL	Josh Gentles	8	0	0+6	0	0+0	0	0+1	0	1+0	0

=== Disciplinary record ===
Includes all competitive matches.

Last updated May 2026

Number	Position	Nation	Name	Championship		League Cup		Scottish Cup		Challenge Cup		Total	
Number	Position	Nation	Name	Booked	Sent off (straight red)	Booked	Sent off (straight red)	Booked	Sent off (straight red)	Booked	Sent off (straight red)	Booked	Sent off (straight red)
1	GK	(Scotland)	Josh Rae	2	0	0	0	0	0	0	0	2	0
2	DF	(England)	Jai Rowe	2	0	0	0	0	0	1	0	3	0
3	DF	(Scotland)	Ewan Wilson	3	0	0	0	0	0	0	0	3	0
4	DF	(Scotland)	Paul Hanlon	3	0	0	0	0	0	0	0	3	0
5	DF	(Scotland)	Callum Fordyce	2	0	0	0	0	0	0	0	2	0
6	DF	(Republic of Ireland)	Darragh O'Connor	6	0	0	0	0	0	0	0	6	0
7	DF	(Malaysia)	Richard Chin	4	0	0	0	0	0	0	0	4	0
8	MF	(Scotland)	Ross Matthews	9	0	0	0	0	0	0	0	9	0
9	FW	(Scotland)	Jack Hamilton	2	0	1	0	0	0	0	0	3	0
10	FW	(Scotland)	Lewis Vaughan	0	0	0	0	0	0	1	0	1	0
11	FW	(Scotland)	Innes Cameron	0	0	0	0	0	0	0	0	0	0
14	MF	(Scotland)	Josh Mullin	1	2	0	0	0	0	0	0	1	2
17	FW	(Scotland)	Lewis Gibson	0	0	0	0	0	0	0	0	0	0
18	FW	(Scotland)	Paul McMullan	2	0	0	0	0	0	0	0	2	0
19	FW	(Scotland)	Andy Winter	0	0	0	0	0	0	0	0	0	0
20	MF	(Scotland)	Scott Brown	12	0	1	0	1	0	1	0	15	0
21	MF	(Scotland)	Shaun Byrne	1	0	0	0	0	0	0	0	1	0
22	DF	(Republic of Ireland)	Jordan Doherty	4	0	0	0	0	0	1	0	5	0
23	MF	(Scotland)	Dylan Easton	8	0	0	0	0	0	0	0	8	0
24	GK	(Scotland)	Aidan Glavin	0	0	0	0	0	0	0	0	0	0
25	MF	(Scotland)	Kai Montagu	1	0	0	0	0	0	2	0	3	0
26	DF	(Scotland)	Lewis Stevenson	6	0	0	0	0	0	1	0	7	0
27	DF	(Scotland)	Callum Hannah	0	0	0	0	0	0	0	0	0	0
29	MF	(England)	Paul Nsio	8	0	0	0	0	0	2	0	10	0
30	MF	(Scotland)	Logan Raeside	0	0	0	0	0	0	0	0	0	0
Players who left during the season
11	FW	(Scotland)	Callum Smith	0	0	0	0	0	0	0	0	0	0
19	FW	(Wales)	Josh Gentles	0	0	0	0	0	0	0	0	0	0

== Team statistics ==
=== League table ===
Pos	Team	Pld	W	D	L	GF	GA	GD	Pts	Promotion, qualification or relegation
3	Arbroath	36	13	13	10	43	41	+2	52	Qualification for the Premiership play-off quarter-final
4	Dunfermline Athletic	36	14	9	13	52	41	+11	51	Qualification for the Premiership play-off quarter-final
5	Raith Rovers	36	12	9	15	43	42	+1	45	
6	Queen's Park	36	9	14	13	35	48	−13	41	
7	Ayr United	36	8	15	13	38	47	−9	39	

Rules for classification: 1) Points; 2) Goal difference; 3) Goals scored; 4) Head-to head points; 5) Head-to-head goal difference; 6) Play-off (only for deciding promotion, play-off participation and relegation).

=== League Cup table ===
Pos	Team	Pld	W	PW	PL	L	GF	GA	GD	Pts	Qualification	STJ	RAI	ICT	EKB	ELG
1	St Johnstone	4	4	0	0	0	15	2	+13	12	Qualification for the second round	—	3–1	—	—	8–0
2	Raith Rovers	4	2	0	0	2	13	9	+4	6		—	—	5–1	2–4	—
3	Inverness Caledonian Thistle	4	2	0	0	2	9	8	+1	6		0–1	—	—	—	2–0
4	East Kilbride	4	2	0	0	2	11	12	−1	6		1–3	—	2–6	—	—
5	Elgin City	4	0	0	0	4	2	19	−17	0		—	1–5	—	1–4	—

Rules for classification: 1) goal difference, 2) goals scored, 3) away goals scored, 4) matches won, 5) away matches won, 6) drawing of lots.

=== Management statistics ===
Last updated on 1 May 2026

Name	From	To	P	W	D	L	Win% (Note: Win% is the percentage of matches won rounded to two decimal places.)
Barry Robson	29 December 2024	11 November 2025	21	8	3	10	38.10
Paul Hanlon (interim)	11 November 2025	25 November 2025	2	0	1	1	0.00
Dougie Imrie	25 November 2025		27	13	5	9	48.15

== Transfers ==
=== Players in ===
Player	From	Fee
(England) Jai Rowe	(England) Boston United	Free
(Scotland) Aidan Glavin	(Scotland) Kilmarnock	Free
(Scotland) Josh Rae	(Scotland) St Johnstone	Undisclosed
(Malaysia) Richard Chin	(England) Farnborough	Free
(Scotland) Paul McMullan	(Republic of Ireland) Derry City	Undisclosed
(Wales) Josh Gentles	(Scotland) Rangers	Co-Operation Loan
(Scotland) Ewan Wilson	(Scotland) Motherwell	Loan
(Republic of Ireland) Darragh O'Connor	(England) York City	Loan
(England) Paul Nsio	(Scotland) Rangers	Co-Operation Loan
(Scotland) Innes Cameron	(England) Barrow	Loan

=== Players out ===
Player	To	Fee
(Scotland) Aidan Connolly	(Scotland) Queen's Park	Free
(Scotland) Sam Stanton	(Scotland) St Johnstone	Undisclosed
(Scotland) Euan Murray	(Scotland) Queen's Park	Free
(Scotland) Lewis Gibson	(Scotland) Montrose	Loan
(Scotland) Logan Raeside	(Scotland) Hill of Beath Hawthorn	Loan
(Scotland) Callum Hannah	(Scotland) Dundonald Bluebell	Loan
(Scotland) Callum Smith	(Scotland) Queen's Park	Free
(Scotland) Logan Raeside	(Scotland) Dundonald Bluebell	Loan
