= 2023–24 Raith Rovers F.C. season =

Raith Rovers
2023–24 season
- Chairman: Steven MacDonald
- Manager: Ian Murray
- Stadium: Stark's Park
- Championship: 2nd
- Scottish Cup: 4th Round
- League Cup: 2nd Round
- Challenge Cup: Semi-Final
- Top goalscorer: League: Lewis Vaughan (15 goals); All: Lewis Vaughan (20 goals)
- Highest home attendance: 7,923
- Lowest home attendance: 1,088
- Average home league attendance: 4,191
| Home colours | Away colours |

The 2023–24 season was Raith Rovers' fourth season back in the second tier of Scottish football after being promoted from Scottish League One at the end of the 2019–20 season. Raith Rovers also competed in the League Cup, Challenge Cup, the Scottish Cup and the Fife Cup.

== Summary ==
=== Management ===
Raith were led by manager Ian Murray. The 2023–24 season was his second season at the club.

== Results & fixtures ==
Win Draw Loss Postponed

=== Friendlies ===
| 24 June 2023 Friendly | Linlithgow Rose | 1–4 | Raith Rovers | Prestonfield |
| 14:30 | Cunningham 25' | Raith Report | Mullin 3', 36'; Easton 20'; Gullan 74' | Attendance: 840 |

| 27 June 2023 Friendly | Montrose | 1–3 | Raith Rovers | Links Park |
| 19:45 | McAllister 50' | Raith Report | Gullan 23'; Vaughan 29'; Easton 45' | Attendance: 372 |

| 8 July 2023 Friendly | East Fife | 0–2 | Raith Rovers | Bayview Stadium |
| 14:00 | | Raith Report | Vaughan 56' (pen.); Gullan 73' | Attendance: 1,354; Referee: Scott Lambie |

| 20 March 2024 Lewis Vaughan Testimonial | Raith Rovers | 1–5 | Hibernian | Stark's Park |
| 19:45 | Smith 74' | Raith Report | Stevenson 34'; Tavares 47'; McAllister 58'; Hanlon 65'; McDonald 76' | Attendance: 2,240; Referee: Daniel Graves |

=== Fife Cup ===
| 1 July 2023 Round 1 | Kelty Hearts | 2–2 (1–4 p) | Raith Rovers | New Central Park |
| 14:00 | Cunningham 27', 29' | Raith Report | Vaughan 8'; Gullan 64' | Attendance: 837; Referee: Jordan Curran |
| | Penalties |
| | Cunningham (penalty scored); Johnston (penalty missed); Lyon (penalty missed) | | Gullan (penalty scored); Smith (penalty scored); Vaughan (penalty scored); Millen (penalty scored) |

=== Scottish Championship ===
| 5 August 2023 1 | Partick Thistle | 2–2 | Raith Rovers | Firhill Stadium |
| 15:00 | McMillan 5'; Fitzpatrick 45' | Raith Report | Easton 83'; Mitchell 89' | Attendance: 3,468; Referee: Calum Scott |

| 12 August 2023 2 | Raith Rovers | 3–2 | Greenock Morton | Stark's Park |
| 15:00 | Hamilton 5'; Vaughan 14' (pen.); Smith 76' | Raith Report | Muirhead 17'; Crawford 71' | Attendance: 3,041; Referee: David Munro |

| 26 August 2023 3 | Dunfermline Athletic | 0–1 | Raith Rovers | East End Park |
| 15:00 | | Raith Report | Stanton 36' | Attendance: 7,583; Referee: Steven McLean |

| 2 September 2023 4 | Raith Rovers | 3–2 | Queen's Park | Stark's Park |
| 15:00 | Smith 8'; Vaughan 86', 90' | Raith Report | Turner 64'; Thomas 73' | Attendance: 2,984; Referee: Duncan Williams |

| 16 September 2023 5 | Raith Rovers | 1–0 | Inverness CT | Stark's Park |
| 15:00 | Gullan 87' | Raith Report | | Attendance: 2,846; Referee: Chris Graham |

| 23 September 2023 6 | Airdrieonians | 1–0 | Raith Rovers | Excelsior Stadium |
| 15:00 | Gallagher 73' | Raith Report | | Attendance: 1,804; Referee: Lloyd Wilson |

| 30 September 2023 7 | Ayr United | 1–2 | Raith Rovers | Somerset Park |
| 15:00 | Dowds 50' | Raith Report | Easton 23', 26' | Attendance: 1,848; Referee: David Munro |

| 7 October 2023 8 | Raith Rovers | 1–1 | Dundee United | Stark's Park |
| 15:00 | Vaughan 24' | Raith Report | Moult 67' | Attendance: 6,808; Referee: Alan Muir |

| 28 October 2023 10 | Raith Rovers | 1–0 | Dunfermline Athletic | Stark's Park |
| 15:00 | Stanton 90' | Raith Report | | Attendance: 5,925; Referee: Iain Snedden |

| 31 October 2023 11 | Greenock Morton | 1–2 | Raith Rovers | Cappielow |
| 19:45 | Wilson 48' | Raith Report | Connolly 26', 41' | Attendance: 1,408; Referee: David Dickinson |

| 4 November 2023 12 | Raith Rovers | 1–1 | Airdrieonians | Stark's Park |
| 15:00 | Smith 44' | Raith Report | Todorov 55' | Attendance: 3,118; Referee: Chris Graham |

| 11 November 2023 13 | Queen's Park | 2–3 | Raith Rovers | Hampden Park |
| 15:00 | Turner 70'; Paton 74' | Raith Report | Vaughan 39'; Hamilton 89'; Millen 90' (pen.) | Attendance: 1,689; Referee: Craig Napier |

| 2 December 2023 14 | Inverness CT | 1–2 | Raith Rovers | Caledonian Stadium |
| 15:00 | McKay 61' | Raith Report | Vaughan 86'; Gullan 90' (pen.) | Attendance: 2,143; Referee: Duncan Williams |

| 8 December 2023 15 | Raith Rovers | 4–3 | Partick Thistle | Stark's Park |
| 19:45 | O'Reilly 13'; Easton 46'; Smith 79'; Stanton 82' | Raith Report | O'Reilly 51' (o.g.); Graham 59'; Alston 69' | Attendance: 3,447; Referee: Alan Muir |

| 13 December 2023 9 | Arbroath | 1–2 | Raith Rovers | Gayfield Park |
| 19:45 | Hylton 30' (pen.) | Raith Report | Connolly 19'; Vaughan 90' | Attendance: 1,445; Referee: Gavin Duncan |

| 16 December 2023 16 | Dundee United | 0–1 | Raith Rovers | Tannadice Park |
| 15:00 | | Raith Report | Easton 59' | Attendance: 10,334; Referee: John Beaton |

| 22 December 2023 17 | Raith Rovers | 4–4 | Ayr United | Stark's Park |
| 19:45 | Stanton 30'; Vaughan 45', 81' (pen.), 90' | Raith Report | McGeady 29'; Dempsey 55'; Chalmers 63'; Rose 85' | Attendance: 3,698; Referee: Craig Napier |

| 30 December 2023 18 | Raith Rovers | 2–2 | Arbroath | Stark's Park |
| 15:00 | Easton 34'; Hamilton 61' | Raith Report | Adams 76'; McIntosh 81' (pen.) | Attendance: 3,806; Referee: Euan Anderson |

| 2 January 2024 19 | Dunfermline Athletic | 1–2 | Raith Rovers | East End Park |
| 15:00 | Summers 38' | Raith Report | O'Reilly 11', 51' | Attendance: 8,447; Referee: Graham Grainger |

| 6 January 2024 20 | Airdrieonians | 1–0 | Raith Rovers | Excelsior Stadium |
| 15:00 | Todorov 24' | Raith Report | | Attendance: 2,118; Referee: Dan McFarlane |

| 13 January 2024 21 | Raith Rovers | 1–2 | Queen's Park | Stark's Park |
| 15:00 | Hamilton 3' | Raith Report | Bruce 42'; Welsh 56' | Attendance: 3,501; Referee: Peter Stuart |

| 27 January 2024 22 | Raith Rovers | 2–3 | Inverness CT | Stark's Park |
| 15:00 | Hamilton 25'; Vaughan 52' | Raith Report | Samuel 31', 36', 40' | Attendance: 3,387; Referee: Dan McFarlane |

| 16 February 2024 24 | Raith Rovers | 2–1 | Dundee United | Stark's Park |
| 19:45 | Rudden 9'; Brown 89' | Raith Report | Moult 39' | Attendance: 7,923; Referee: Don Robertson |

| 24 February 2024 25 | Ayr United | 1–2 | Raith Rovers | Somerset Park |
| 15:00 | Syla 11' | Raith Report | Rudden 5'; Vaughan 45' | Attendance: 2,276; Referee: Steven McLean |

| 27 February 2024 26 | Raith Rovers | 0–0 | Greenock Morton | Stark's Park |
| 19:45 | | Raith Report | | Attendance: 4,175; Referee: Steven Kirkland |

| 1 March 2024 27 | Arbroath | 3–2 | Raith Rovers | Gayfield Park |
| 19:45 | Bird 61'; McIntosh 69'; Stowe 77' | Raith Report | Rudden 26'; Mullin 49' | Attendance: 1,780; Referee: Grant Irvine |

| 9 March 2024 28 | Raith Rovers | 2–0 | Dunfermline Athletic | Stark's Park |
| 15:00 | Stanton 38'; Easton 78' | Raith Report | | Attendance: 6,274; Referee: Craig Napier |

| 12 March 2024 23 | Partick Thistle | 0–1 | Raith Rovers | Firhill Stadium |
| 19:45 | | Raith Report | Murray 34' | Attendance: 2,319; Referee: Euan Anderson |

| 16 March 2024 29 | Queen's Park | 0–0 | Raith Rovers | Hampden Park |
| 15:00 | | Raith Report | | Attendance: 1,883; Referee: Kevin Clancy |

| 30 March 2024 31 | Dundee United | 2–0 | Raith Rovers | Tannadice Park |
| 15:00 | Watt 7'; Moult 75' (pen.) | Raith Report | | Attendance: 10,336; Referee: Nick Walsh |

| 6 April 2024 32 | Raith Rovers | 2–1 | Ayr United | Stark's Park |
| 15:00 | Easton 45'; Hamilton 65' (pen.) | Raith Report | Chalmers 55' | Attendance: 3,579; Referee: Ross Hardie |

| 9 April 2024 30 | Raith Rovers | 1–3 | Airdrieonians | Stark's Park |
| 19:45 | Mullin 68' | Raith Report | Frizzell 26', 30'; McGregor 80' | Attendance: 3,646; Referee: Lloyd Wilson |

| 13 April 2024 33 | Raith Rovers | 0–0 | Partick Thistle | Stark's Park |
| 15:00 | | Raith Report | | Attendance: 3,928; Referee: David Munro |

| 19 April 2024 34 | Inverness CT | 0–1 | Raith Rovers | Caledonian Stadium |
| 19:45 | | Raith Report | Vaughan 49' | Attendance: 2,385; Referee: Euan Anderson |

| 27 April 2024 35 | Greenock Morton | 0–0 | Raith Rovers | Cappielow |
| 15:00 | | Raith Report | | Attendance: 2,098; Referee: Colin Steven |

| 3 May 2024 36 | Raith Rovers | 5–0 | Arbroath | Stark's Park |
| 19:45 | Smith 21', 25'; Vaughan 56' (pen.), 79' (pen.); Hamilton 82' | Raith Report | | Attendance: 3,357; Referee: Scott Lambie |

=== Scottish Premiership Play-Offs ===
| 14 May 2024 Play-Off Semi-Final Leg 1 | Partick Thistle | 1–2 | Raith Rovers | Firhill Stadium |
| 19:45 | Alston 72' | Raith Report | Brown 22'; Vaughan 40' | Attendance: 5,497; Referee: Chris Graham |

| 17 May 2024 Play-Off Semi-Final Leg 2 | Raith Rovers | 1–2 (a.e.t.) (3–3 agg.) (4–3 p) | Partick Thistle | Stark's Park |
| 19:45 | Matthews 30' | Raith Report | Alston 16', 45+1' | Attendance: 6,070; Referee: Steven McLean |
| | Penalties |
| | Brown (penalty missed); Turner (penalty scored); Hamilton (penalty scored); Easton (penalty scored); Vaughan (penalty scored) | | (penalty scored) Stanway; (penalty scored) McBeth; (penalty scored) Graham; (penalty missed) McMillan; (penalty missed) Diack |

| 23 May 2024 Play-Off Final Leg 1 | Raith Rovers | 1–2 | Ross County | Stark's Park |
| 20:00 | Stanton 82' | Raith Report | Dhanda 53' (pen.); Baldwin 71' | Attendance: 6,216; Referee: John Beaton |

| 26 May 2024 Play-Off Final Leg 2 | Ross County | 4–0 (6–1 agg.) | Raith Rovers | Victoria Park |
| 12:00 | Murray 19', 75'; White 47'; Khela 86' | Raith Report | | Attendance: 5,797; Referee: Don Robertson |

=== Scottish League Cup ===
| 15 July 2023 Group F | Raith Rovers | 1–1 (2–4 p) | Dunfermline Athletic | Stark's Park |
| 17:15 | Easton 38' | Raith Report | McCann 30' | Attendance: 4,022; Referee: Don Robertson |
| | Penalties |
| | Gullan (penalty missed); Arnott (penalty scored); Easton (penalty scored); Vaughan (penalty missed) | | McCann (penalty scored); Fisher (penalty scored); Chalmers (penalty scored); Allan (penalty missed); Todd (penalty scored) |

| 18 July 2023 Group F | Raith Rovers | 2–0 | Albion Rovers | Stark's Park |
| 19:45 | Mullin 76'; Duffy 90' (o.g.) | Raith Report | | Attendance: 1,088; Referee: Colin Steven |

| 26 July 2023 Group F | Kilmarnock | 2–2 (4–5 p) | Raith Rovers | Rugby Park |
| 19:45 | Cameron 42'; Findlay 80' | Raith Report | Easton 46'; Dick 74' | Attendance: 3,316; Referee: John Beaton |
| | Penalties |
| | Armstrong (penalty missed); Kennedy (penalty scored); Magennis (penalty scored); Watkins (penalty scored); Polworth (penalty scored); Cameron (penalty missed) | | Mullin (penalty scored); Smith (penalty scored); Hamilton (penalty scored); Vaughan (penalty scored); Easton (penalty missed); Corr (penalty scored) |

| 29 July 2023 Group F | Annan Athletic | 2–3 | Raith Rovers | Galabank |
| 15:00 | Galloway 27'; Luissint 37' | Raith Report | Watson 11'; Smith 51'; Vaughan 79' (pen.) | Attendance: 419; Referee: Scott Lambie |

| 20 August 2023 Round 2 | Hibernian | 2–1 | Raith Rovers | Easter Road |
| 14:00 | Youan 57'; Vente 69' | Raith Report | Smith 68' | Attendance: 8,674; Referee: Nick Walsh |

=== Scottish Challenge Cup ===
| 9 September 2023 Round 3 | Raith Rovers | 3–0 | Cliftonville | Stark's Park |
| 14:00 | Masson 50'; Vaughan 69'; Hamilton 73' | Raith Report | | Attendance: 1,561; Referee: Grant Irvine |

| 14 October 2023 Round 4 | Raith Rovers | 3–1 | Montrose | Stark's Park |
| 15:00 | Smith 32'; Easton 57'; Mullin 67' | Raith Report | Watson 72' | Attendance: 1,388; Referee: Lloyd Wilson |

| 17 November 2023 Quarter-Final | Hamilton Academical | 1–4 | Raith Rovers | New Douglas Park |
| 19:45 | Zanatta 73' | Raith Report | Stanton 8'; Hamilton 58', 61'; Easton 90' | Attendance: 971; Referee: Iain Snedden |

| 2 February 2024 Semi-Final | Raith Rovers | 0–1 | Airdrieonians | Stark's Park |
| 19:40 | | Raith Report | Todorov 6' | Attendance: 2,640; Referee: Colin Steven |

=== Scottish Cup ===
| 24 November 2023 Round 3 | Dunfermline Athletic | 0–3 | Raith Rovers | East End Park |
| 19:45 | | Raith Report | Hamilton 15'; Stanton 65'; Vaughan 70' | Attendance: 5,243; Referee: Willie Collum |

| 20 January 2024 Round 4 | Livingston | 2–1 | Raith Rovers | Almondvale Stadium |
| 15:00 | Brandon 32'; MacKay 82' | Raith Report | Hamilton 5' | Attendance: 2,580; Referee: Grant Irvine |

== Player statistics ==
=== Squad ===
Last updated 26 May 2024

| No. | Pos | Nat | Player | Total | | Championship | | League Cup | | Scottish Cup | | Challenge Cup | | Fife Cup | | Premiership Play-Offs | |
| No. | Pos | Nat | Player | Apps | Goals | Apps | Goals | Apps | Goals | Apps | Goals | Apps | Goals | Apps | Goals | Apps | Goals |
|---|---|---|---|---|---|---|---|---|---|---|---|---|---|---|---|---|---|
| 1 | GK | (Poland) POL | Kevin Dąbrowski | 50 | 0 | 35+0 | 0 | 5+0 | 0 | 1+0 | 0 | 3+1 | 0 | 1+0 | 0 | 4+0 | 0 |
| 2 | DF | (Malta) MLT | James Brown | 12 | 0 | 11+1 | 0 | 0+0 | 0 | 0+0 | 0 | 0+0 | 0 | 0+0 | 0 | 0+0 | 0 |
| 3 | DF | (Scotland) SCO | Liam Dick | 49 | 1 | 34+1 | 0 | 5+0 | 1 | 0+0 | 0 | 4+0 | 0 | 1+0 | 0 | 4+0 | 0 |
| 4 | DF | (Scotland) SCO | Ross Millen | 26 | 1 | 20+0 | 1 | 1+0 | 0 | 1+0 | 0 | 3+0 | 0 | 1+0 | 0 | 0+0 | 0 |
| 5 | DF | (Scotland) SCO | Keith Watson | 22 | 1 | 13+1 | 0 | 5+0 | 1 | 0+0 | 0 | 1+0 | 0 | 1+0 | 0 | 1+0 | 0 |
| 6 | DF | (Scotland) SCO | Euan Murray | 37 | 1 | 30+0 | 1 | 1+0 | 0 | 0+0 | 0 | 2+0 | 0 | 0+0 | 0 | 4+0 | 0 |
| 7 | MF | (Scotland) SCO | Aidan Connolly | 36 | 3 | 17+11 | 3 | 0+0 | 0 | 1+0 | 0 | 2+1 | 0 | 0+0 | 0 | 3+1 | 0 |
| 8 | MF | (Scotland) SCO | Ross Matthews | 20 | 1 | 8+8 | 0 | 0+0 | 0 | 0+0 | 0 | 0+0 | 0 | 0+0 | 0 | 4+0 | 1 |
| 9 | FW | (Scotland) SCO | Jamie Gullan | 22 | 4 | 1+14 | 2 | 3+0 | 1 | 0+1 | 0 | 2+0 | 0 | 1+0 | 1 | 0+0 | 0 |
| 10 | FW | (Scotland) SCO | Lewis Vaughan | 50 | 20 | 27+9 | 15 | 5+0 | 1 | 1+0 | 1 | 3+0 | 1 | 1+0 | 1 | 4+0 | 1 |
| 11 | FW | (Scotland) SCO | Callum Smith | 48 | 8 | 23+11 | 6 | 5+0 | 1 | 1+0 | 0 | 2+1 | 1 | 1+1 | 0 | 0+3 | 0 |
| 12 | DF | (Scotland) SCO | Lee Ashcroft | 1 | 0 | 1+0 | 0 | 0+0 | 0 | 0+0 | 0 | 0+0 | 0 | 0+0 | 0 | 0+0 | 0 |
| 13 | GK | (Scotland) SCO | Andrew McNeil | 2 | 0 | 2+0 | 0 | 0+0 | 0 | 0+0 | 0 | 0+0 | 0 | 0+0 | 0 | 0+0 | 0 |
| 14 | MF | (Scotland) SCO | Josh Mullin | 43 | 4 | 27+5 | 2 | 5+0 | 1 | 1+0 | 0 | 0+2 | 1 | 1+0 | 0 | 1+1 | 0 |
| 15 | DF | (Scotland) SCO | Dylan Corr | 15 | 0 | 5+0 | 0 | 4+0 | 0 | 0+0 | 0 | 0+1 | 0 | 0+1 | 0 | 3+1 | 0 |
| 16 | MF | (Scotland) SCO | Sam Stanton | 44 | 8 | 29+2 | 5 | 5+0 | 0 | 1+0 | 1 | 2+0 | 1 | 1+0 | 0 | 4+0 | 1 |
| 17 | GK | (Scotland) SCO | Robbie Thomson | 1 | 0 | 0+0 | 0 | 0+0 | 0 | 0+0 | 0 | 1+0 | 0 | 0+0 | 0 | 0+0 | 0 |
| 18 | MF | (Scotland) SCO | Kyle Turner | 17 | 0 | 8+6 | 0 | 0+0 | 0 | 0+0 | 0 | 1+0 | 0 | 0+0 | 0 | 2+0 | 0 |
| 19 | FW | (Scotland) SCO | Jack Hamilton | 39 | 13 | 19+12 | 8 | 2+2 | 2 | 1+0 | 1 | 1+0 | 2 | 0+0 | 0 | 1+1 | 0 |
| 20 | MF | (Scotland) SCO | Scott Brown | 45 | 2 | 30+5 | 1 | 1+0 | 0 | 1+0 | 0 | 4+0 | 0 | 0+0 | 0 | 4+0 | 1 |
| 21 | MF | (Scotland) SCO | Shaun Byrne | 40 | 0 | 26+6 | 0 | 1+0 | 0 | 0+0 | 0 | 3+0 | 0 | 0+0 | 0 | 4+0 | 0 |
| 22 | MF | (Scotland) SCO | Ethan Ross | 4 | 1 | 0+3 | 0 | 0+0 | 1 | 0+0 | 0 | 0+1 | 0 | 0+0 | 0 | 0+0 | 0 |
| 23 | MF | (Scotland) SCO | Dylan Easton | 46 | 12 | 22+12 | 8 | 4+0 | 2 | 1+0 | 0 | 4+0 | 2 | 1+0 | 0 | 1+1 | 0 |
| 24 | MF | (Scotland) SCO | Scott McGill | 26 | 0 | 6+12 | 0 | 4+0 | 0 | 0+1 | 0 | 1+1 | 0 | 0+0 | 0 | 0+1 | 0 |
| 25 | MF | (Scotland) SCO | Aaron Arnott | 3 | 0 | 0+1 | 0 | 0+2 | 0 | 0+0 | 0 | 0+0 | 0 | 0+0 | 0 | 0+0 | 0 |
| 26 | FW | (Scotland) SCO | Kieran Mitchell | 4 | 1 | 0+1 | 1 | 0+3 | 0 | 0+0 | 0 | 0+0 | 0 | 0+0 | 0 | 0+0 | 0 |
| 27 | DF | (Scotland) SCO | Callum Hannah | 3 | 0 | 0+1 | 0 | 0+0 | 0 | 0+0 | 0 | 0+2 | 0 | 0+0 | 0 | 0+0 | 0 |
| 29 | FW | (Scotland) SCO | Zak Rudden | 17 | 3 | 8+6 | 3 | 0+0 | 0 | 0+0 | 0 | 1+0 | 0 | 0+0 | 0 | 0+2 | 0 |
| 30 | DF | (Scotland) SCO | Adam Masson | 7 | 1 | 0+4 | 0 | 0+0 | 0 | 0+0 | 0 | 3+0 | 1 | 0+0 | 0 | 0+0 | 0 |
| 34 | DF | (Republic of Ireland) IRL | Daniel O'Reilly | 7 | 3 | 6+0 | 3 | 0+0 | 0 | 1+0 | 0 | 0+0 | 0 | 0+0 | 0 | 0+0 | 0 |

=== Disciplinary record ===
Includes all competitive matches.

Last updated May 2024

| Number | Position | Nation | Name | Championship | | League Cup | | Scottish Cup | | Challenge Cup | | Fife Cup | | Premiership Play-Offs | | Total | |
| Number | Position | Nation | Name | Booked | Sent off (straight red) | Booked | Sent off (straight red) | Booked | Sent off (straight red) | Booked | Sent off (straight red) | Booked | Sent off (straight red) | Booked | Sent off (straight red) | Booked | Sent off (straight red) |
| 1 | GK | (Poland) | Kevin Dąbrowski | 1 | 0 | 0 | 0 | 0 | 0 | 0 | 0 | 0 | 0 | 0 | 0 | 1 | 0 |
| 2 | DF | (Malta) | James Brown | 0 | 0 | 0 | 0 | 0 | 0 | 0 | 0 | 0 | 0 | 0 | 0 | 0 | 0 |
| 3 | DF | (Scotland) | Liam Dick | 4 | 0 | 0 | 1 | 0 | 0 | 0 | 0 | 0 | 0 | 0 | 0 | 4 | 1 |
| 4 | DF | (Scotland) | Ross Millen | 7 | 1 | 0 | 0 | 0 | 0 | 0 | 0 | 0 | 0 | 0 | 0 | 7 | 1 |
| 5 | DF | (Scotland) | Keith Watson | 4 | 0 | 0 | 0 | 0 | 0 | 0 | 0 | 0 | 0 | 0 | 0 | 4 | 0 |
| 6 | DF | (Scotland) | Euan Murray | 3 | 1 | 0 | 0 | 0 | 0 | 0 | 0 | 0 | 0 | 1 | 0 | 4 | 1 |
| 7 | MF | (Scotland) | Aidan Connolly | 1 | 0 | 0 | 0 | 1 | 0 | 1 | 0 | 0 | 0 | 1 | 0 | 4 | 0 |
| 8 | MF | (Scotland) | Ross Matthews | 2 | 0 | 0 | 0 | 0 | 0 | 0 | 0 | 0 | 0 | 1 | 0 | 3 | 0 |
| 9 | FW | (Scotland) | Jamie Gullan | 3 | 0 | 0 | 0 | 0 | 0 | 0 | 0 | 0 | 0 | 0 | 0 | 3 | 0 |
| 10 | FW | (Scotland) | Lewis Vaughan | 4 | 0 | 0 | 0 | 1 | 0 | 0 | 0 | 0 | 0 | 0 | 0 | 5 | 0 |
| 11 | FW | (Scotland) | Callum Smith | 3 | 0 | 0 | 0 | 1 | 0 | 0 | 0 | 0 | 0 | 0 | 0 | 4 | 0 |
| 12 | DF | (Scotland) | Lee Ashcroft | 0 | 0 | 0 | 0 | 0 | 0 | 0 | 0 | 0 | 0 | 0 | 0 | 0 | 0 |
| 13 | GK | (Scotland) | Andrew McNeil | 0 | 0 | 0 | 0 | 0 | 0 | 0 | 0 | 0 | 0 | 0 | 0 | 0 | 0 |
| 14 | MF | (Scotland) | Josh Mullin | 3 | 0 | 0 | 0 | 0 | 0 | 0 | 0 | 0 | 0 | 0 | 0 | 3 | 0 |
| 15 | DF | (Scotland) | Dylan Corr | 1 | 0 | 0 | 0 | 0 | 0 | 0 | 0 | 0 | 0 | 1 | 0 | 2 | 0 |
| 16 | MF | (Scotland) | Sam Stanton | 1 | 0 | 2 | 0 | 0 | 0 | 0 | 0 | 0 | 0 | 0 | 0 | 3 | 0 |
| 17 | GK | (Scotland) | Robbie Thomson | 0 | 0 | 0 | 0 | 0 | 0 | 0 | 0 | 0 | 0 | 0 | 0 | 0 | 0 |
| 18 | MF | (Scotland) | Kyle Turner | 3 | 0 | 0 | 0 | 0 | 0 | 0 | 0 | 0 | 0 | 1 | 0 | 4 | 0 |
| 19 | FW | (Scotland) | Jack Hamilton | 4 | 0 | 0 | 0 | 1 | 0 | 1 | 0 | 0 | 0 | 0 | 0 | 6 | 0 |
| 20 | MF | (Scotland) | Scott Brown | 6 | 0 | 0 | 0 | 0 | 0 | 0 | 0 | 0 | 0 | 1 | 0 | 7 | 0 |
| 21 | MF | (Scotland) | Shaun Byrne | 8 | 0 | 1 | 0 | 0 | 0 | 0 | 0 | 0 | 0 | 0 | 0 | 9 | 0 |
| 22 | MF | (Scotland) | Ethan Ross | 0 | 0 | 0 | 0 | 0 | 0 | 0 | 0 | 0 | 0 | 0 | 0 | 0 | 0 |
| 23 | MF | (Scotland) | Dylan Easton | 8 | 0 | 2 | 0 | 0 | 0 | 1 | 0 | 0 | 0 | 1 | 0 | 12 | 0 |
| 24 | MF | (Scotland) | Scott McGill | 1 | 0 | 0 | 0 | 0 | 0 | 0 | 0 | 0 | 0 | 0 | 0 | 1 | 0 |
| 25 | MF | (Scotland) | Aaron Arnott | 0 | 0 | 0 | 0 | 0 | 0 | 0 | 0 | 0 | 0 | 0 | 0 | 0 | 0 |
| 26 | FW | (Scotland) | Kieran Mitchell | 0 | 0 | 0 | 0 | 0 | 0 | 0 | 0 | 0 | 0 | 0 | 0 | 0 | 0 |
| 27 | DF | (Scotland) | Callum Hannah | 0 | 0 | 0 | 0 | 0 | 0 | 0 | 0 | 0 | 0 | 0 | 0 | 0 | 0 |
| 29 | FW | (Scotland) | Zak Rudden | 2 | 0 | 0 | 0 | 0 | 0 | 1 | 0 | 0 | 0 | 0 | 0 | 3 | 0 |
| 30 | DF | (Scotland) | Adam Masson | 1 | 0 | 0 | 0 | 0 | 0 | 0 | 0 | 0 | 0 | 0 | 0 | 1 | 0 |
| 34 | DF | (Republic of Ireland) | Daniel O'Reilly | 1 | 0 | 0 | 0 | 1 | 0 | 0 | 0 | 0 | 0 | 0 | 0 | 2 | 0 |

== Team statistics ==
=== League table ===
| Pos | Team | Pld | W | D | L | GF | GA | GD | Pts | Promotion, qualification or relegation |
|---|---|---|---|---|---|---|---|---|---|---|
| 1 | Dundee United (C, P) | 36 | 22 | 9 | 5 | 73 | 23 | +50 | 75 | Promotion to the Premiership |
| 2 | Raith Rovers | 36 | 20 | 9 | 7 | 58 | 42 | +16 | 69 | Qualification for the Premiership play-off semi-final |
| 3 | Partick Thistle | 36 | 14 | 13 | 9 | 63 | 54 | +9 | 55 | Qualification for the Premiership play-off quarter-final |
| 4 | Airdrieonians | 36 | 15 | 7 | 14 | 44 | 44 | 0 | 52 | Qualification for the Premiership play-off quarter-final |
| 5 | Greenock Morton | 36 | 12 | 9 | 15 | 43 | 46 | −3 | 45 | |

Rules for classification: 1) Points; 2) Goal difference; 3) Goals scored; 4) Head-to-to head points; 5) Head-to-head goal difference; 6) Play-off (only for deciding promotion, play-off participation and relegation).
(C) Champions; (P) Promoted

=== League Cup table ===
| Pos | Team | Pld | W | PW | PL | L | GF | GA | GD | Pts | Qualification | KIL | RAI | DNF | ALB | ANN |
|---|---|---|---|---|---|---|---|---|---|---|---|---|---|---|---|---|
| 1 | Kilmarnock | 4 | 3 | 0 | 1 | 0 | 9 | 3 | +6 | 10 | Qualification for the second round | — | 2–2p | — | — | 3–0 |
| 2 | Raith Rovers | 4 | 2 | 1 | 1 | 0 | 8 | 5 | +3 | 9 | Qualification for the second round | — | — | 1–1p | 2–0 | — |
| 3 | Dunfermline Athletic | 4 | 2 | 1 | 0 | 1 | 8 | 3 | +5 | 8 | | 0–2 | — | — | — | 4–0 |
| 4 | Albion Rovers | 4 | 1 | 0 | 0 | 3 | 3 | 8 | −5 | 3 | | 1–2 | — | 0–3 | — | — |
| 5 | Annan Athletic | 4 | 0 | 0 | 0 | 4 | 3 | 12 | −9 | 0 | | — | 2–3 | — | 1–2 | — |

Rules for classification: 1) goal difference, 2) goals scored, 3) away goals scored, 4) matches won, 5) away matches won, 6) drawing of lots.

=== Management statistics ===
Last updated on 26 May 2024

| Name | From | To | P | W | D | L | Win% (Note: Win% is the percentage of matches won rounded to two decimal places.) |
|---|---|---|---|---|---|---|---|
| Ian Murray | 24 May 2022 | | 52 | 30 | 9 | 13 | 57.69 |
