= 2022–23 Raith Rovers F.C. season =

Raith Rovers
2022–23 season
- Chairman: Steven MacDonald
- Manager: Ian Murray
- Stadium: Stark's Park
- Championship: 7th
- Scottish Cup: Quarter-Final
- League Cup: Group Stage
- Challenge Cup: Runners-Up
- Top goalscorer: League: Aidan Connolly (10 goals); All: Aidan Connolly (15 goals)
- Highest home attendance: 4,436
- Lowest home attendance: 833
- Average home league attendance: 1,982
Home colours	Away colours

The 2022–23 season was Raith Rovers' third season back in the second tier of Scottish football after being promoted from Scottish League One at the end of the 2019–20 season. Raith Rovers also competed in the League Cup, Challenge Cup & the Scottish Cup.

== Summary ==
=== Management ===
Raith will be led by manager Ian Murray. The 2022–23 season is his first season at the club.

== Results & fixtures ==
Win Draw Loss Postponed

=== Friendlies ===
25 June 2022 Grant Thomson Testimonial	Dunbar United	1–7	Raith Rovers	New Countess Park
15:00	Redpath 84'	Raith Report	Gullan 13', 16'; Easton 26'; Connolly 30'; Ross 64'; Mitchell 76'; Trialist 88'	Attendance: 472

29 June 2022 Friendly	Raith Rovers	1–2	Queen of the South	Stark's Park
19:45	Gullan 69' (pen.)	Raith Report	Paton 46' (pen.); Connelly 70'	Attendance: 811; Referee: Gavin Duncan

2 July 2022 Friendly	Kelty Hearts	1–1	Raith Rovers	New Central Park
15:00	Agyeman 55'	Raith Report	Gullan 34'	Attendance: 893; Referee: Stewart Luke

9 July 2022 Friendly	Raith Rovers	4–0	Alloa Athletic	Stark's Park
12:00	Ross 2'; Gullan 8', 12'; Zanatta 17'	Raith Report

8 December 2022 Friendly	Hibernian	1–0	Raith Rovers	Easter Road
12:00	Campbell 5'

=== Scottish Championship ===
30 July 2022 1	Cove Rangers	2–0	Raith Rovers	Balmoral Stadium
15:00	Megginson 8', 50'	Raith Report		Attendance: 1,138; Referee: Matthew MacDermid

6 August 2022 2	Raith Rovers	0–1	Dundee	Stark's Park
15:00		Raith Report	Mulligan 13'	Attendance: 3,222; Referee: Chris Graham

13 August 2022 3	Raith Rovers	2–1	Greenock Morton	Stark's Park
15:00	Dick 51'; Connolly 66'	Raith Report	Blues 80'	Attendance: 1,600; Referee: Euan Anderson

20 August 2022 4	Hamilton Academical	0–2	Raith Rovers	New Douglas Park
15:00		Raith Report	Easton 2'; Gullan 74'	Attendance: 1,548; Referee: Calum Scott

27 August 2022 5	Partick Thistle	2–1	Raith Rovers	Firhill Stadium
15:00	Tiffoney 3'; Lawless 42'	Raith Report	Ross 43'	Attendance: 3,211; Referee: Matthew MacDermid

3 September 2022 6	Raith Rovers	0–2	Inverness Caledonian Thistle	Stark's Park
15:00		Raith Report	Allardice 61' (pen.); McKay 90'	Attendance: 1,745; Referee: Don Robertson

17 September 2022 8	Raith Rovers	3–2	Ayr United	Stark's Park
15:00	Connell 8'; Stanton 35'; Brown 83'	Raith Report	Young 51'; Murdoch 69'	Attendance: 2,045; Referee: Greg Aitken

1 October 2022 9	Queen's Park	1–0	Raith Rovers	Ochilview Park
15:00	Eze 59'	Raith Report		Attendance: 862; Referee: Grant Irvine

8 October 2022 10	Raith Rovers	3–0	Cove Rangers	Stark's Park
15:00	Connolly 6'; Gullan 27'; Stanton 65'	Raith Report		Attendance: 1,517; Referee: David Dickinson

15 October 2022 11	Greenock Morton	1–0	Raith Rovers	Cappielow
15:00	Gillespie 90' (pen.)	Raith Report		Attendance: 1,534; Referee: Greg Aitken

19 October 2022 7	Arbroath	0–1	Raith Rovers	Gayfield Park
19:45		Raith Report	Stanton 41'	Attendance: 1,663; Referee: Alan Muir

22 October 2022 12	Inverness Caledonian Thistle	1–1	Raith Rovers	Caledonian Stadium
15:00	Deas 38'	Raith Report	Stanton 13'	Attendance: 2,225; Referee: Matthew MacDermid

29 October 2022 13	Raith Rovers	3–0	Partick Thistle	Stark's Park
15:00	Connolly 12', 32'; Connell 44' (pen.)	Raith Report		Attendance: 2,096; Referee: Gavin Duncan

5 November 2022 14	Raith Rovers	3–1	Hamilton Academical	Stark's Park
15:00	Easton 5'; Connolly 50' (pen.); Dick 80'	Raith Report	Tiéhi 17'	Attendance: 1,890; Referee: Scott Lambie

12 November 2022 15	Dundee	2–0	Raith Rovers	Dens Park
15:00	Robinson 49' (pen.), 54'	Raith Report		Attendance: 5,022; Referee: Grant Irvine

19 November 2022 16	Raith Rovers	2–5	Queen's Park	Stark's Park
15:00	Connolly 18', 82'	Raith Report	Murray 36', 48'; Thomas 44', 77'; Thomson 72'	Attendance: 1,861; Referee: Don Robertson

3 December 2022 17	Ayr United	2–0	Raith Rovers	Somerset Park
15:00	Mullin 31', 70'	Raith Report		Attendance: 2,094; Referee: Kevin Clancy

17 December 2022 18	Raith Rovers	1–1	Arbroath	Stark's Park
15:00	Little 6' (o.g.)	Raith Report	Hamilton 45'	Attendance: 1,264; Referee: Calum Scott

23 December 2022 19	Raith Rovers	2–2	Greenock Morton	Stark's Park
19:45	Schwake 19' (o.g.); Connolly 21'	Raith Report	Baird 24'; Muirhead 44'	Attendance: 1,431; Referee: Matthew MacDermid

2 January 2023 20	Hamilton Academical	0–1	Raith Rovers	New Douglas Park
15:00		Raith Report	Gullan 9'	Attendance: 1,193; Referee: Lloyd Wilson

6 January 2023 21	Raith Rovers	1–1	Dundee	Stark's Park
19:45	Connolly 38'	Raith Report	McGhee 78'	Attendance: 3,050; Referee: Craig Napier

14 January 2023 22	Cove Rangers	2–2	Raith Rovers	Balmoral Stadium
15:00	McIntosh 32' (pen.); Neill 90'	Raith Report	Vaughan 29'; Easton 43'	Attendance: 726; Referee: Lloyd Wilson

28 January 2023 23	Raith Rovers	2–2	Inverness Caledonian Thistle	Stark's Park
15:00	Vaughan 29'; Connolly 62'	Raith Report	Henderson 49'; McKay 83'	Attendance: 2,025; Referee: Scott Lambie

4 February 2023 24	Arbroath	1–2	Raith Rovers	Gayfield Park
15:00	McKenna 20'	Raith Report	Brown 70'; McBride 77'	Attendance: 2,042; Referee: Alan Newlands

17 February 2023 25	Queen's Park	1–1	Raith Rovers	Ochilview Park
19:45	Shields 51'	Raith Report	Akio 75'	Attendance: 923; Referee: Craig Napier

24 February 2023 26	Raith Rovers	0–0	Ayr United	Stark's Park
19:45		Raith Report		Attendance: 1,939; Referee: Colin Steven

4 March 2023 27	Partick Thistle	3–0	Raith Rovers	Firhill Stadium
15:00	Tiffoney 39', 63'; Graham 53'	Raith Report		Attendance: 3,302; Referee: Greg Aitken

18 March 2023 29	Raith Rovers	6–1	Cove Rangers	Stark's Park
15:00	Gonçalves 4'; Vaughan 27', 70' (pen.); Nolan 54'; Easton 57'; McGill 79'	Raith Report	Longridge 66'	Attendance: 1,573; Referee: Lloyd Wilson

1 April 2023 31	Raith Rovers	2–0	Queen's Park	Stark's Park
15:00	Lang 30'; Vaughan 62'	Raith Report		Attendance: 1,679; Referee: Grant Irvine

4 April 2023 28	Raith Rovers	1–2	Hamilton Academical	Stark's Park
19:45	Lawson 50' (o.g.)	Raith Report	McGowan 62'; Ashley-Seal 64'	Attendance: 1,691; Referee: Euan Anderson

8 April 2023 32	Inverness Caledonian Thistle	2–0	Raith Rovers	Caledonian Stadium
15:00	Henderson 12'; Shaw 21'	Raith Report		Attendance: 2,198; Referee: Craig Napier

11 April 2023 30	Dundee	3–1	Raith Rovers	Dens Park
19:45	Robinson 29', 53'; Jakubiak 75'	Raith Report	Akio 77'	Attendance: 5,009; Referee: Greg Aitken

15 April 2023 33	Raith Rovers	1–1	Arbroath	Stark's Park
15:00	Brown 3'	Raith Report	O'Brien 48'	Attendance: 2,150; Referee: Iain Snedden

22 April 2023 34	Greenock Morton	1–0	Raith Rovers	Cappielow
15:00	King 2'	Raith Report		Attendance: 1,546; Referee: Dan McFarlane

29 April 2023 35	Ayr United	1–0	Raith Rovers	Somerset Park
15:00	Musonda 55'	Raith Report		Attendance: 2,331; Referee: David Munro

5 May 2023 36	Raith Rovers	2–2	Partick Thistle	Stark's Park
19:45	Vaughan 35' (pen.); McGill 59'	Raith Report	Brownlie 21'; Tiffoney 68'	Attendance: 2,899; Referee: Chris Graham

=== Scottish League Cup ===
13 July 2022 Group A	Raith Rovers	6–0	Peterhead	Stark's Park
19:45	Easton 16', 51'; Dixon 32' (o.g.); Dick 62'; Gullan 65'; Connolly 89'	Raith Report		Attendance: 1,031; Referee: Calum Scott

16 July 2022 Group A	Raith Rovers	1–1 (4–5 p)	Stirling Albion	Stark's Park
15:00	Connolly 20'	Raith Report	Moore 43'	Attendance: 960; Referee: Lloyd Wilson
	Penalties
	Gullan (penalty scored); Dick (penalty scored); Mahady (penalty scored); Coulson (penalty missed); Easton (penalty scored); Brown (penalty missed)		Thomson (penalty missed); Cummins (penalty scored); Clarke (penalty scored); Burns (penalty scored); Moore (penalty scored); Banner (penalty scored)

19 July 2022 Group A	Dumbarton	0–0 (2–3 p)	Raith Rovers	Dumbarton Football Stadium
19:45		Raith Report		Attendance: 276; Referee: Graham Grainger
	Penalties
	Buchanan (penalty missed); Byrne (penalty missed); McKee (penalty scored); Love (penalty scored); Carswell (penalty missed)		Gullan (penalty missed); Berra (penalty scored); Millen (penalty scored); Dick (penalty missed); Easton (penalty scored)

24 July 2022 Group A	Aberdeen	3–0	Raith Rovers	Pittodrie Stadium
15:00	Miovski 6' (pen.); McCrorie 39'; Hayes 46'	Raith Report		Attendance: 8,785; Referee: David Munro

=== Scottish Challenge Cup ===
24 September 2022 Round 3	Cove Rangers	0–1	Raith Rovers	Balmoral Stadium
15:00		Raith Report	McBride 11'	Attendance: 405; Referee: Gavin Duncan

10 December 2022 Round 4	Raith Rovers	1–1 (4–2 p)	Greenock Morton	Stark's Park
15:00	Vaughan 61'	Raith Report	King 49'	Attendance: 833; Referee: Mike Roncone
	Penalties
	Gullan (penalty scored); Connell (penalty scored); Connolly (penalty scored); Millen (penalty scored)		(penalty scored) Kabia; (penalty missed) King; (penalty scored) McGrattan; (penalty missed) Grimshaw

11 January 2023 Quarter-Final	Queen's Park	0–1	Raith Rovers	Ochilview Park
19:45		Raith Report	Frederiksen 80'	Attendance: 636; Referee: Chris Graham

8 February 2023 Semi-Final	Dundee	2–2 (a.e.t.) (3–4 p)	Raith Rovers	Dens Park
19:45	Cameron 5', 28'	Raith Report	Akio 77'; Stanton 82'	Attendance: 2,948; Referee: Colin Steven
	Penalties
	McGhee (penalty scored); Williamson (penalty scored); Tolaj (penalty scored); Maguire (penalty missed); Robinson (penalty missed)		(penalty scored) Spencer; (penalty scored) Akio; (penalty missed) Connolly; (penalty scored) Millen; (penalty scored) Easton

26 March 2023 Final	Raith Rovers	0–1	Hamilton Academical	Falkirk Stadium
16:15		Raith Report	Tumilty 30'	Attendance: 5,566; Referee: Colin Steven

=== Scottish Cup ===
26 November 2022 Round 3	Raith Rovers	3–0	Auchinleck Talbot	Stark's Park
15:00	Connolly 63', 73', 86'	Raith Report		Attendance: 1,697; Referee: David Dickinson

24 January 2023 Round 4	Linlithgow Rose	0–2	Raith Rovers	Prestonfield
19:45		Raith Report	Gullan 55', 88'	Attendance: 1,720; Referee: Graham Grainger

11 February 2023 Round 5	Raith Rovers	3–1	Motherwell	Stark's Park
15:00	Gullan 17' (pen.); Stanton 39'; Gonçalves 85'	Raith Report	Van Veen 51'	Attendance: 4,436; Referee: Nick Walsh

12 March 2023 Quarter-Final	Rangers	3–0	Raith Rovers	Ibrox Stadium
13:00	Goldson 42'; Nolan 58' (o.g.); Arfield 87'	Raith Report		Attendance: 41,168; Referee: John Beaton

== Player statistics ==
=== Squad ===
Last updated 5 May 2023

No.	Pos	Nat	Player	Total		Championship		League Cup		Scottish Cup		Challenge Cup	
No.	Pos	Nat	Player	Apps	Goals	Apps	Goals	Apps	Goals	Apps	Goals	Apps	Goals
1	GK	(Scotland) SCO	Jamie MacDonald	12	0	4+0	0	3+0	0	4+0	0	1+0	0
3	DF	(Scotland) SCO	Liam Dick	45	3	33+0	2	4+0	1	4+0	0	4+0	0
4	DF	(Scotland) SCO	Ross Millen	43	0	33+0	0	4+0	0	3+0	0	3+0	0
5 - left on 26/07/22	DF	(Scotland) SCO	Christophe Berra	4	0	0+0	0	4+0	0	0+0	0	0+0	0
5 - joined on 28/07/22	DF	(Republic of Ireland) IRL	Ryan Nolan	34	1	22+3	1	0+0	0	5+0	0	3+1	0
6	MF	(Scotland) SCO	Brad Spencer	33	0	21+4	0	0+0	0	5+0	0	3+0	0
7	MF	(Scotland) SCO	Aidan Connolly	46	15	33+0	10	4+0	2	4+1	3	1+3	0
8	MF	(Scotland) SCO	Ross Matthews	6	0	0+5	0	0+0	0	0+0	0	0+1	0
9	FW	(Scotland) SCO	Jamie Gullan	26	7	15+3	3	4+0	1	2+0	3	2+0	0
10	FW	(Scotland) SCO	Lewis Vaughan	26	7	15+5	6	0+0	0	2+1	0	2+1	1
11 - joined on 02/09/22	FW	(Scotland) SCO	Connor McBride	24	2	5+12	1	0+0	0	2+2	0	2+1	1
11 - left on 24/08/22	FW	(Canada) CAN	Dario Zanatta	5	0	0+2	0	3+0	0	0+0	0	0+0	0
12	DF	(Scotland) SCO	Tom Lang	20	1	14+0	1	0+0	0	3+0	0	2+1	0
13	GK	(Scotland) SCO	Andrew McNeil	4	0	2+0	0	0+0	0	0+0	0	2+0	0
14	DF	(Republic of Ireland) IRL	Connor O'Riordan	21	0	18+0	0	0+0	0	1+0	0	2+0	0
15	DF	(Malawi) MWI	Kieran Ngwenya	30	0	18+7	0	0+0	0	2+2	0	1+0	0
16	MF	(Scotland) SCO	Sam Stanton	42	6	29+3	4	3+0	0	4+1	2	2+0	0
17	GK	(Scotland) SCO	Robbie Thomson	5	0	1+1	0	1+0	0	1+0	0	1+0	0
18 - left on 26/01/23	FW	(Scotland) SCO	Kyle Connell	23	2	9+11	2	0+0	0	0+1	0	1+1	0
18 - joined on 28/01/23	FW	(South Sudan) SSD	William Akio	15	3	8+6	2	0+0	0	1+0	1	0+0	0
19	FW	(Scotland) SCO	Luke Mahady	1	0	0+0	0	0+1	0	0+0	0	0+0	0
20	MF	(Scotland) SCO	Scott Brown	47	3	35+0	3	4+0	0	4+0	0	4+0	0
22	MF	(Scotland) SCO	Ethan Ross	29	1	13+7	1	4+0	0	0+2	0	1+2	0
23	MF	(Scotland) SCO	Dylan Easton	44	6	26+6	4	3+1	2	4+1	0	2+1	0
24 - left on 30/09/22	FW	(Scotland) SCO	David Goodwillie	0	0	0+0	0	0+0	0	0+0	0	0+0	0
24 - joined on 20/01/23	MF	(Scotland) SCO	Scott McGill	11	2	7+4	2	0+0	0	0+0	0	0+0	0
25	MF	(Scotland) SCO	Aaron Arnott	3	0	0+1	0	1+1	0	0+0	0	0+0	0
26	FW	(Scotland) SCO	Kieran Mitchell	10	0	0+3	0	1+3	0	0+1	0	1+1	0
27	MF	(Scotland) SCO	Quinn Coulson	11	0	0+6	0	0+4	0	0+0	0	1+0	0
28	GK	(Scotland) SCO	Kyle Bow	0	0	0+0	0	0+0	0	0+0	0	0+0	0
29	DF	(Scotland) SCO	Greig Young	6	0	0+4	0	0+1	0	0+1	0	0+0	0
30	DF	(Scotland) SCO	Adam Masson	8	0	2+1	0	0+1	0	3+0	0	1+0	0
47 - left on 31/1/23	FW	(Faroe Islands) FRO	John Frederiksen	11	1	2+7	0	0+0	0	0+1	0	1+0	1
77	FW	(Guinea-Bissau) GNB	Esmaël Gonçalves	7	2	2+2	1	0+0	0	1+1	1	1+0	0

=== Disciplinary record ===
Includes all competitive matches.

Last updated May 2023

Number	Position	Nation	Name	Championship		League Cup		Scottish Cup		Challenge Cup		Total	
Number	Position	Nation	Name	Booked	Sent off (straight red)	Booked	Sent off (straight red)	Booked	Sent off (straight red)	Booked	Sent off (straight red)	Booked	Sent off (straight red)
1	GK	(Scotland)	Jamie MacDonald	1	0	0	0	0	0	0	0	1	0
3	DF	(Scotland)	Liam Dick	8	0	1	0	2	0	0	0	11	0
4	DF	(Scotland)	Ross Millen	7	0	1	0	0	0	1	0	9	0
5 - left on 26/07/22	DF	(Scotland)	Christophe Berra	0	0	0	0	0	0	0	0	0	0
5 - joined on 28/07/22	DF	(Republic of Ireland)	Ryan Nolan	4	0	0	0	1	0	1	0	6	0
6	MF	(Scotland)	Brad Spencer	7	0	0	0	2	0	2	0	11	0
7	MF	(Scotland)	Aidan Connolly	5	0	0	0	1	0	0	0	6	0
8	MF	(Scotland)	Ross Matthews	0	0	0	0	0	0	0	0	0	0
9	FW	(Scotland)	Jamie Gullan	1	0	0	0	0	0	0	0	1	0
10	FW	(Scotland)	Lewis Vaughan	1	1	0	0	1	0	1	0	3	1
11 - joined on 02/09/22	FW	(Scotland)	Connor McBride	0	0	0	0	0	0	1	0	1	0
11 - left on 24/08/22	FW	(Canada)	Dario Zanatta	0	0	1	0	0	0	0	0	1	0
12	DF	(Scotland)	Tom Lang	2	1	0	0	2	0	1	0	5	1
13	GK	(Scotland)	Andrew McNeil	0	0	0	0	0	0	0	0	0	0
14	DF	(Republic of Ireland)	Connor O'Riordan	3	0	0	0	0	0	1	0	4	0
15	DF	(Malawi)	Kieran Ngwenya	1	0	0	0	0	0	0	0	1	0
16	MF	(Scotland)	Sam Stanton	4	0	1	0	0	0	0	0	5	0
17	GK	(Scotland)	Robbie Thomson	0	0	0	0	1	0	0	0	1	0
18 - left on 26/01/13	FW	(Scotland)	Kyle Connell	3	0	0	0	0	0	0	0	3	0
18 - joined on 28/01/13	FW	(South Sudan)	William Akio	0	0	0	0	0	0	0	0	0	0
19	FW	(Scotland)	Luke Mahady	0	0	0	0	0	0	0	0	0	0
20	MF	(Scotland)	Scott Brown	8	0	1	0	2	0	0	0	11	0
22	MF	(Scotland)	Ethan Ross	0	0	0	0	0	0	0	0	0	0
23	MF	(Scotland)	Dylan Easton	7	0	0	0	2	0	0	0	9	0
24 - left on 30/09/22	FW	(Scotland)	David Goodwillie	1	0	0	0	0	0	0	0	1	0
24 - joined on 20/01/23	MF	(Scotland)	Scott McGill	4	0	0	0	0	0	0	0	4	0
25	MF	(Scotland)	Aaron Arnott	0	0	0	0	0	0	0	0	0	0
26	FW	(Scotland)	Kieran Mitchell	0	0	0	0	0	0	0	0	0	0
27	MF	(Scotland)	Quinn Coulson	0	0	1	0	0	0	1	0	2	0
28	GK	(Scotland)	Kyle Bow	0	0	0	0	0	0	0	0	0	0
29	DF	(Scotland)	Greig Young	1	0	0	0	0	0	0	0	1	0
30	DF	(Scotland)	Adam Masson	1	0	0	0	0	0	1	0	2	0
47	FW	(Faroe Islands)	John Frederiksen	1	0	0	0	0	0	0	0	1	0
77	FW	(Guinea-Bissau)	Esmaël Gonçalves	0	0	0	0	0	0	0	0	0	0

== Team statistics ==
=== League table ===
Pos	Team	Pld	W	D	L	GF	GA	GD	Pts	Promotion, qualification or relegation
5	Greenock Morton	36	15	12	9	53	43	+10	57	
6	Inverness Caledonian Thistle	36	15	10	11	52	47	+5	55	
7	Raith Rovers	36	11	10	15	46	49	−3	43	
8	Arbroath	36	6	16	14	29	47	−18	34	
9	Hamilton Academical (R)	36	7	10	19	31	63	−32	31	Qualification for the Championship play-offs

Rules for classification: 1) Points; 2) Goal difference; 3) Goals scored; 4) Head-to-to head points; 5) Head-to-head goal difference; 6) Play-off (only for deciding promotion, play-off participation and relegation).
(R) Relegated

=== League Cup table ===
Pos	Team	Pld	W	PW	PL	L	GF	GA	GD	Pts	Qualification	ABE	STI	RAI	DUM	PET
1	Aberdeen	4	4	0	0	0	12	0	+12	12	Qualification for the second round	—	—	3–0	2–0	—
2	Stirling Albion	4	2	1	0	1	6	7	−1	8		0–5	—	—	—	3–0
3	Raith Rovers	4	1	1	1	1	7	4	+3	6		—	1–1p	—	—	6–0
4	Dumbarton	4	1	0	1	2	3	4	−1	4		—	1–2	0–0p	—	—
5	Peterhead	4	0	0	0	4	0	13	−13	0		0–2	—	—	0–2	—

Rules for classification: 1) goal difference, 2) goals scored, 3) away goals scored, 4) matches won, 5) away matches won, 6) drawing of lots.

=== Management statistics ===
Last updated on 5 May 2023

Name	From	To	P	W	D	L	Win% (Note: Win% is the percentage of matches won rounded to two decimal places.)
Ian Murray	24 May 2022		49	20	10	19	40.82
