= Ross Matthews (footballer) =

Association football player (born 1996)

Personal information
- Date of birth: 23 January 1996 (age 30)
- Place of birth: Edinburgh, Scotland
- Position: Midfielder

Team information
- Current team: Bentleigh Greens Soccer Club
- Number: 8

Youth career
- Edinburgh City
- Royston Rangers
- 2004–2012: Heart of Midlothian
- 2012–2013: Raith Rovers

Senior career*
Years	Team	Apps	(Gls)
2013–2026	Raith Rovers	376	(19)
2026–	Bentleigh Greens Soccer Club		
- * Club domestic league appearances and goals as of 14 July 2026

Ross Matthews (born 23 January 1996) is a Scottish footballer playing for Bentleigh Greens Soccer Club in Melbourne, Australia. He previously spent the majority of his playing career at Scottish Championship club Raith Rovers in Scotland.

== Career ==
Born in Edinburgh, Matthews began his career with Edinburgh City and Royston Rangers boys clubs before being quickly scooped up by Heart of Midlothian. He began his professional career at Raith Rovers. He was first included in a matchday squad on 10 August 2013, remaining an unused substitute in a 0–1 home defeat to Hamilton Academical in the first game of the Scottish Championship season. On 28 December, he made his debut and only appearance of the season, replacing Calum Elliot for the final seven minutes of a 3–0 loss at Livingston. Matthews has been regular in the first team squad for the 2015–16 season and made his first start in the 3rd round tie of the League Cup loss to Celtic at Celtic Park. After the match, he was praised by manager Ray Mckinnon for an outstanding dominant performance in the middle of the park.

Since the beginning of the 2016–17 season for Rovers, Matthews was a regular within the first team squad under new head coach Gary Locke, moving from his natural central midfield position, into the right midfield role. On 6 August 2016, Mathews netted his first goal for the club and the 2nd of the match, during a 2–0 away win over Ayr United. Later on, he played a pivotal role in the 2019–20 Scottish League One victory, and promotion to the Scottish Championship. On 2 March 2022, he scored a goal in a 2–1 victory over Kilmarnock in the Challenge Cup semi-final, which his club eventually achieved after a 3–1 victory over Queen of the South in the final. In June 2024, he extended his contract until 2025.

On 9 October 2024, Matthews was honoured with a testimonial match against his boyhood club Hearts. Matthews' 13-year term with Raith Rovers ended in 2026 with him 12th on the club's all-time appearance list.

Following the close of the 2025–2026 season and the end of his contract with Raith Rovers, Matthews announced he had signed a short-term contract with Bentleigh Greens Soccer Club in Melbourne, Australia, where he will combine playing with a move into youth coaching.

== Career statistics ==
As of match played 26 May 2024

Appearances and goals by club, season and competition
Club	Season	League			Scottish Cup		League Cup		Other		Total	
Club	Season	Division	Apps	Goals	Apps	Goals	Apps	Goals	Apps	Goals	Apps	Goals
Raith Rovers	2013–14	Scottish Championship	1	0	0	0	0	0	0	0	1	0
Raith Rovers	2014–15	Scottish Championship	1	0	0	0	0	0	0	0	1	0
Raith Rovers	2015–16	Scottish Championship	15	0	2	0	1	0	1	0	19	0
Raith Rovers	2016–17	Scottish Championship	24	2	2	0	3	0	3	0	32	2
Raith Rovers	2017–18	Scottish League One	34	0	1	0	4	1	5	0	44	1
Raith Rovers	2018–19	Scottish League One	31	2	2	0	4	0	6	1	43	3
Raith Rovers	2019–20	Scottish League One	20	3	2	0	4	0	3	1	29	4
Raith Rovers	2020–21	Scottish Championship	17	3	0	0	4	0	4	0	25	3
Raith Rovers	2021–22	Scottish Championship	31	1	3	1	2	0	5	1	41	3
Raith Rovers	2022–23	Scottish Championship	5	0	0	0	0	0	1	0	6	0
Raith Rovers	2023–24	Scottish Championship	16	0	0	0	0	0	4	1	20	1
Raith Rovers	2024-25	Scottish Championship	31	0	3	0	4	0	1	0	39	0
Raith Rovers	2025-26	Scottish Championship	31	1	2	0	4	0	4	0	41	1
Career total			257	12	17	1	30	1	37	4	341	18

== Honours ==
Raith Rovers

- Scottish League One: 2019–20
- Scottish Challenge Cup: 2021–22, 2025–26
