= Paul Nsio =

English footballer (born 2006)

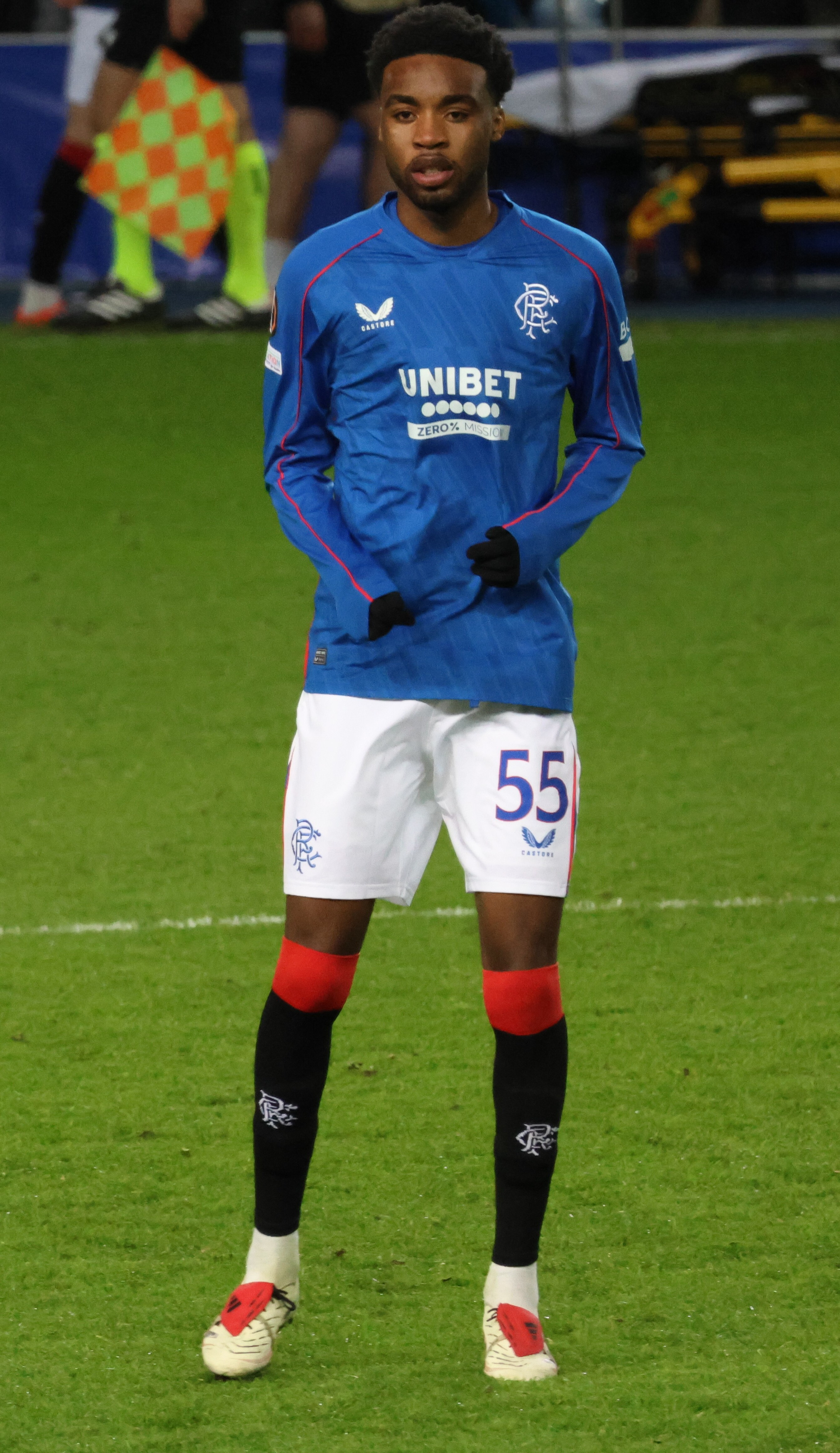
- Nsio with Rangers in 2025

Personal information
- Date of birth: 15 March 2006 (age 20)
- Place of birth: London, England
- Height: 1.81 m (5 ft 11 in)
- Position: Midfielder

Team information
- Current team: St Mirren (on loan from Rangers)
- Number: 48

Youth career
- Lambeth Tigers
- 2022–2025: Rangers

Senior career*
Years	Team	Apps	(Gls)
2025–	Rangers	1	(0)
2025–2026	→ Raith Rovers (loan)	24	(2)
2026–	→ St Mirren (loan)	6	(1)
- * Club domestic league appearances and goals as of 20:24, 24 September 2026 (UTC)

Paul Nsio (born 15 March 2006) is an English footballer who plays as a midfielder for Scottish Premiership club St Mirren, on loan from Rangers.

== Career ==
In June 2022, Nsio joined Rangers from London club Lambeth Tigers, as part of five new players for the under-18 team. He was one of three of those players to come from the English capital, and was described in The Athletic as "a flair player whose rangy physique means he can go box-to-box".

On 30 August 2022, Nsio was one of three 16-year-olds to make their first-team debuts as late substitutes for Rangers in a 3–1 home win over Queen of the South, as the club made it to the quarter-finals of the Scottish League Cup. He came on for the final two minutes in place of Fashion Sakala, under the management of Giovanni van Bronckhorst.

With the Rangers B Team, Nsio took part in the Scottish Challenge Cup. He scored the equaliser on 30 July 2024 as the team won 3–1 at home to Bo'ness United in the first round. The following 26 January, he made his Scottish Premiership debut in a win by the same score away to Dundee United, coming on in the last minute for Nedim Bajrami.

On 12 September 2025, Nsio signed a new two-year contract with Rangers, and was loaned for the rest of the season to Raith Rovers in the Scottish Championship. He was an unused substitute for seven games due to a lack of fitness, before making his debut on 1 November in a 1–1 home draw with Greenock Morton. In his sixth game on 13 December, he scored his first professional goal in a 6–0 win over Ross County at Stark's Park.

Nsio scored Raith Rovers' goal on 27 January 2026 as they drew 1–1 and then defeated Queen's Park on penalties in the Challenge Cup quarter-finals. On 5 April, he played in the 4–1 final win over Inverness Caledonian Thistle at Firhill Stadium. Across all competitions, he played 31 games and scored three goals, helping the team to 5th place, and was named their Young Player of the Year; manager Dougie Imrie was disappointed to not sign him for a second season.

On 30 July 2026, Nsio was loaned for one season to St Mirren in the Scottish Premiership. Manager Craig McLeish noted his versatility, having played in pre-season at right back for Rangers, and said he had strength and athleticism that was not present in the club's own young players. He made his debut two days later in a 2–0 win away to Falkirk, and was described as "eye-catching" in The Renfrewshire Gazette; he scored his first top-flight goal on 30 August in a 3–3 home draw with Motherwell.

== Personal life ==
Born in England, Nsio is of DR Congolese descent and holds dual-citizenship.

== Career statistics ==
As of 30 July 2026

Appearances and goals by club, season and competition
Club	Season	League			Scottish Cup		League Cup		Continental		Other		Total	
Club	Season	Division	Apps	Goals	Apps	Goals	Apps	Goals	Apps	Goals	Apps	Goals	Apps	Goals
Rangers	2022–23	Scottish Premiership	0	0	0	0	1	0	0	0	—		1	0
Rangers	2023–24	Scottish Premiership	0	0	0	0	0	0	0	0	—		0	0
Rangers	2024–25	Scottish Premiership	1	0	0	0	0	0	1 (Note: Appearance(s) in UEFA Europa League)	0	—		2	0
Rangers	2025–26	Scottish Premiership	0	0	0	0	0	0	0	0	—		0	0
Rangers	Total		1	0	0	0	1	0	1	0	—		3	0
Rangers B	2023–24	—			—		—		—		3 (Note: Appearance(s) in Scottish Challenge Cup)	0	3	0
Rangers B	2024–25	—			—		—		—		4	1	4	1
Rangers B	2025–26	—			—		—		—		1	0	1	0
Rangers B	Total		—		—		—		—		8	1	8	1
Raith Rovers (loan)	2025–26	Scottish Championship	24	2	2	0	0	0	—		5	1	31	3
Career total			25	2	2	0	1	0	1	0	13	2	42	4

== Honours ==
Raith Rovers

- Scottish Challenge Cup: 2025–26
