= Jack Hamilton (footballer, born 2000) =

Scottish footballer

Personal information
- Date of birth: 30 June 2000 (age 26)
- Place of birth: Coldingham, Scotland
- Height: 6 ft 2 in (1.87 m)
- Position: Striker

Team information
- Current team: Raith Rovers
- Number: 9

Senior career*
| Years | Team | Apps | (Gls) |
| 2017–2023 | Livingston | 26 | (2) |
| 2017 | → Penicuik Athletic (loan) | | |
| 2018 | → Berwick Rangers (loan) | 16 | (8) |
| 2019 | → Alloa Athletic (loan) | 15 | (1) |
| 2019–2020 | → Queen of the South (loan) | 22 | (4) |
| 2020–2021 | → East Fife (loan) | 9 | (7) |
| 2021 | → Arbroath (loan) | 14 | (8) |
| 2022 | → Arbroath (loan) | 16 | (7) |
| 2022–2023 | → Hartlepool United (loan) | 31 | (3) |
| 2023– | Raith Rovers | 75 | (17) |
- * Club domestic league appearances and goals as of 01:12, 22 May 2026

Jack Hamilton (born 30 June 2000) is a Scottish professional footballer who plays as a striker for Scottish Championship club Raith Rovers.

== Career ==
=== Livingston ===
Hamilton started his career with Livingston and spent time on loan at Penicuik Athletic, and Berwick Rangers in 2018. During the January 2019 transfer window, Hamilton was then moved out on loan to Alloa Athletic.

On 1 July 2019, Hamilton was sent out to Queen of the South on a season long loan. In March 2020 he signed a new contract with Livingson. In September 2020 he moved on loan to East Fife. After scoring seven goals from nine league games for the Fifers, Hamilton was named SPFL League 1 Player of the Month for December. He was recalled by his parent club Livingston on 8 January 2021. On 29 January, he headed out on loan once again, this time joining Scottish Championship side Arbroath where he scored eight goals in fourteen games and earned Scottish Championship Player of the Month for April. Thus, he collected two SPFL Player of the Month awards on two different teams for the 2020–2021 season.

In January 2022, Hamilton re-joined Arbroath on loan for the remainder for the 2021–22 season, where he scored ten goals in twenty appearances. He was twice named SPFL Team of the Week. Between his two loan spells, he scored eighteen goals in thirty four games for Arbroath.

On 1 July 2022, Hamilton signed a new two-year deal at Livingston.

On 20 July 2022, Hamilton signed for Hartlepool United on a season-long loan with a view to a permanent deal for the 2023–24 season. He was named in the League Two Team of the Week for back to back weeks on 31 December 2022, and 3 January 2023.

=== Raith Rovers ===
On 29 May 2023, Hamilton moved to Raith Rovers for a nominal transfer fee.

== Career statistics ==
As of match played 1 May 2026

Appearances and goals by club, season and competition
| Club | Season | League | | | National Cup | | League Cup | | Other | | Total | |
| Club | Season | Division | Apps | Goals | Apps | Goals | Apps | Goals | Apps | Goals | Apps | Goals |
|---|---|---|---|---|---|---|---|---|---|---|---|---|
| Livingston | 2017–18 | Scottish Championship | 0 | 0 | 0 | 0 | 1 | 0 | 0 | 0 | 1 | 0 |
| Livingston | 2018–19 | Scottish Premiership | 13 | 1 | 1 | 0 | 4 | 1 | 2 | 0 | 20 | 2 |
| Livingston | 2019–20 | Scottish Premiership | 0 | 0 | 0 | 0 | 0 | 0 | 0 | 0 | 0 | 0 |
| Livingston | 2020–21 | Scottish Premiership | 5 | 1 | 0 | 0 | 0 | 0 | 0 | 0 | 5 | 1 |
| Livingston | 2021–22 | Scottish Premiership | 8 | 0 | 0 | 0 | 2 | 0 | 0 | 0 | 10 | 0 |
| Livingston | 2022–23 | Scottish Premiership | 0 | 0 | 0 | 0 | 0 | 0 | 0 | 0 | 0 | 0 |
| Livingston | Total | | 26 | 2 | 1 | 0 | 7 | 1 | 2 | 0 | 36 | 3 |
| Berwick Rangers (loan) | 2017–18 | Scottish Second Division | 16 | 8 | 0 | 0 | 0 | 0 | 0 | 0 | 16 | 8 |
| Alloa Athletic (loan) | 2018–19 | Scottish Championship | 15 | 1 | 0 | 0 | 0 | 0 | 0 | 0 | 15 | 1 |
| Queen of the South (loan) | 2019–20 | Scottish Championship | 22 | 4 | 0 | 0 | 2 | 0 | 1 | 0 | 25 | 4 |
| East Fife (loan) | 2020–21 | Scottish League One | 9 | 7 | 0 | 0 | 4 | 2 | 0 | 0 | 13 | 9 |
| Arbroath (loan) | 2020–21 | Scottish Championship | 14 | 8 | 1 | 0 | 0 | 0 | 0 | 0 | 15 | 8 |
| Arbroath (loan) | 2021–22 | Scottish Championship | 16 | 7 | 2 | 3 | 0 | 0 | 2 | 0 | 20 | 10 |
| Hartlepool United (loan) | 2022–23 | League Two | 31 | 3 | 4 | 1 | 1 | 0 | 2 | 0 | 38 | 4 |
| Raith Rovers | 2023–24 | Scottish Championship | 30 | 7 | 2 | 2 | 4 | 0 | 3 | 3 | 40 | 12 |
| Raith Rovers | 2024–25 | Scottish Championship | 13 | 3 | 1 | 1 | 4 | 1 | 0 | 0 | 18 | 5 |
| Raith Rovers | 2025–26 | Scottish Championship | 32 | 7 | 2 | 0 | 4 | 2 | 5 | 0 | 43 | 9 |
| Raith Rovers | Total | | 75 | 17 | 5 | 3 | 12 | 3 | 8 | 3 | 101 | 26 |
| Career total | | | 224 | 57 | 13 | 7 | 28 | 6 | 15 | 3 | 280 | 73 |

== Honours ==
Raith Rovers

- Scottish Challenge Cup: 2025–26
