= Scott Brown (footballer, born 1994) =

Scottish footballer

Personal information
- Full name: Scott David Brown
- Date of birth: 25 November 1994 (age 31)
- Place of birth: Glasgow, Scotland
- Height: 5 ft 10 in (1.78 m)
- Position: Midfielder

Team information
- Current team: Raith Rovers
- Number: 20

Youth career
- 2010–2011: Clyde
- 2011–2012: Bradford City

Senior career*
Years	Team	Apps	(Gls)
2012–2013	Bradford City	0	(0)
2013–2016	St Johnstone	19	(1)
2015–2016	→ Dumbarton (loan)	16	(0)
2016–2022	Peterhead	183	(29)
2022–	Raith Rovers	122	(7)
- * Club domestic league appearances and goals as of 4 May 2026

Scott David Brown (born 25 November 1994) is a Scottish professional footballer who plays for Scottish Championship club Raith Rovers as a midfielder.

== Career ==
Following a trial in June 2011, Brown moved from Clyde to Bradford City in July 2011. He made his senior debut for them in a 1–1 draw against Northampton Town in the FA Cup on 3 November 2012. He was offered a professional contract by the club on 11 April 2013, alongside Louie Swain. In July 2013, it was announced that Brown was close to transferring to Scottish club St Johnstone, and Bradford City's official website confirmed he would not be given a 2013–14 squad number because of the proposed move. The deal was completed later that month.

Brown made his St Johnstone debut on 5 October 2013 against Inverness Caledonian Thistle in the Premiership, coming on as a substitute for David Wotherspoon in the 86th minute. He scored his first senior goal on 7 May 2014 in St Johnstone's 3–3 draw at home to Celtic.

He signed for Dumbarton on loan on 20 August 2015. He left at the end of his loan deal in January 2016.

He moved to Raith Rovers in May 2022.

== Career statistics ==
As of match played 25 October 2025

Appearances and goals by club, season and competition
Club	Season	League			National cup (Note: Includes FA Cup and Scottish Cup)		League cup (Note: Includes EFL Cup, Scottish League Cup)		Continental		Other		Total	
Club	Season	Division	Apps	Goals	Apps	Goals	Apps	Goals	Apps	Goals	Apps	Goals	Apps	Goals
Bradford City	2012–13	League Two	0	0	3	0	0	0	—		0	0	3	0
St Johnstone	2013–14	Scottish Premiership	4	1	1	0	0	0	0	0	—		5	1
St Johnstone	2014–15	Scottish Premiership	10	0	0	0	0	0	3 (Note: Appearance(s) in UEFA Europa League)	0	—		13	0
St Johnstone	2015–16	Scottish Premiership	5	0	0	0	0	0	1	0	—		6	0
St Johnstone	Total		19	1	1	0	0	0	4	0	—		24	1
Dumbarton (loan)	2015–16	Scottish Championship	16	0	0	0	0	0	—		0	0	16	0
Peterhead	2016–17	Scottish League One	32	2	1	0	0	0	—		5 (Note: One appearance in Scottish Challenge Cup; Four appearances, one goal in Scottish League One play-offs)	0	38	2
Peterhead	2017–18	Scottish League Two	32	3	2	1	4	0	—		7 (Note: Three appearances in Scottish Challenge Cup; Four appearances in Scottish League One play-offs)	0	45	4
Peterhead	2018–19	Scottish League Two	36	5	3	1	3	0	—		2 (Note: Appearance(s) in Scottish Challenge Cup)	0	44	6
Peterhead	2019–20	Scottish League One	27	8	0	0	4	0	—		1	0	32	8
Peterhead	2020–21	Scottish League One	22	5	1	0	4	0	—		0	0	27	5
Peterhead	2021–22	Scottish League One	34	6	2	1	3	2	—		2	0	41	9
Peterhead	Total		183	29	9	3	18	2	—		17	0	227	34
Raith Rovers	2022–23	Scottish Championship	35	3	3	0	4	0	—		5	0	47	3
Raith Rovers	2023–24	Scottish Championship	34	1	2	0	1	0	—		8 (Note: Four appearances in Scottish Challenge Cup; Four appearances, one goal in Scottish Premiership play-offs)	1	45	2
Raith Rovers	2024–25	Scottish Championship	22	1	3	0	3	0	—		0	0	28	1
Raith Rovers	2025–26	Scottish Championship	12	0	0	0	4	0	—		0	0	16	0
Raith Rovers	Total		103	5	8	0	12	0	—		13	1	136	6
Career total			321	35	21	3	30	2	4	0	30	1	406	41

== Honours ==
Raith Rovers

- Scottish Challenge Cup: 2025–26
