= Scott McGill (footballer) =

Scottish footballer (born 2002)

Personal information
- Date of birth: 27 January 2002 (age 24)
- Place of birth: Edinburgh, Scotland
- Height: 1.83 m (6 ft 0 in)
- Position: Midfielder

Team information
- Current team: Arbroath
- Number: 15

Youth career
- 2006–2009: Hutchison Vale
- 2009–2010: Tynecastle Boys Club
- 2010–2020: Heart of Midlothian

Senior career*
Years	Team	Apps	(Gls)
2020–2023	Heart of Midlothian	1	(0)
2021–2022	→ Airdrieonians (loan)	34	(4)
2022–2023	→ Kelty Hearts (loan)	11	(1)
2023	→ Raith Rovers (loan)	11	(2)
2023–2024	Raith Rovers	18	(0)
2024	Dundalk	9	(0)
2025–2026	Stenhousemuir	43	(2)
2026–	Arbroath	5	(0)
- * Club domestic league appearances and goals as of 17 October 2026

Scott McGill (born 27 January 2002) is a Scottish professional footballer who plays as a midfielder for Scottish Championship club Arbroath. He has previously played for Heart of Midlothian, Airdrieonians, Kelty Hearts, Raith Rovers, Dundalk and Stenhousemuir.

== Early and personal life ==
Born in Edinburgh, McGill grew up in Chesser and attended Balgreen primary school, thereafter joining the SFA Performance Program at Broughton High school Edinburgh.

== Career ==
=== Hearts ===
McGill played youth football for Hutchison Vale and Tynecastle and later for Heart of Midlothian. He signed his first professional contract with the club in June 2018. He made his debut for Heart of Midlothian on 10 October 2020 in a 1–0 Scottish League Cup victory over Cowdenbeath, and appeared again for them three days later in a 3–1 League Cup victory over Raith Rovers. McGill played 90 minutes in a 3-2 victory over East Fife in November 2020 in the Scottish League Cup.

He made his league debut for Hearts on 20 April 2021 in a goalless draw with Greenock Morton. Scott made four appearances for Heart of Midlothian.

=== Airdrieonians ===
On 21 July 2021, he joined Scottish League One club Airdrieonians on loan until May 2022. McGill scored on his debut for Airdrieonians in a 2–0 win in the League Cup against their Lanarkshire derby rivals Motherwell. He went on to play 41 times and score 1 league cup goal and 4 league goals for Airdrieonians during the 2021–22 Scottish League One season.

=== Kelty Hearts ===
McGill was loaned to Kelty Hearts in August 2022. He would make 13 appearances and would score 1 goal in a 2-0 league victory against Falkirk. McGill returned to his parent club Hearts in January 2023. Later that month, he would join Scottish Championship club Raith Rovers on loan until the end of the season.

=== Raith Rovers ===
Following a loan spell at the club, McGill signed on a permanent basis with Raith Rovers during the summer of 2023.

=== Dundalk ===
In June 2024, McGill signed for League of Ireland Premier Division club Dundalk on a permanent basis, signing under manager Jon Daly a coach at Heart of Midlothian when McGill was coming through the Academy.

=== Stenhousemuir ===
On 15 January 2025, McGill signed an 18 month contract with Scottish League One club Stenhousemuir.After playing 58 times and helping them gain promotion to the championship, McGill moved on to another challenge .

=== Arbroath ===
On 5 June 2026, McGill signed a two-year deal with Scottish Championship side Arbroath.

== Career statistics ==
As of match played 27 October 2024

Appearances and goals by club, season and competition
Club	Season	League			National Cup		League Cup		Other		Total	
Club	Season	Division	Apps	Goals	Apps	Goals	Apps	Goals	Apps	Goals	Apps	Goals
Heart of Midlothian U20	2019–20	—			—		—		1 (Note: Appearance(s) in Scottish Challenge Cup)	0	1	0
Heart of Midlothian U20	2021–22	—			—		—		2	0	2	0
Heart of Midlothian U20	2022–23	—			—		—		1	1	1	1
Heart of Midlothian U20	Total		0	0	0	0	0	0	4	1	4	1
Heart of Midlothian	2020–21	Scottish Championship	1	0	0	0	3	0	0	0	4	0
Heart of Midlothian	2021–22	Scottish Premiership	0	0	0	0	0	0	0	0	0	0
Heart of Midlothian	2022–23	Scottish Premiership	0	0	0	0	0	0	0	0	0	0
Heart of Midlothian	Total 108		1	0	0	0	3	0	0	0	4	0
Airdrieonians (loan)	2021–22	Scottish League One	34	4	2	0	2	1	3 (Note: Appearance(s) in playoffs)	0	41	5
Kelty Hearts (loan)	2022–23	Scottish League One	12	1	1	0	0	0	1	0	13	1
Raith Rovers (loan)	2022–23	Scottish Championship	11	2	—		—		—		11	2
Raith Rovers	2023–24	Scottish Championship	18	0	1	0	4	0	3 (Note: 2 appearances in Scottish Challenge Cup & 1 appearance in the playoffs)	0	26	0
Dundalk	2024	LOI Premier Division	9	0	1	0	—		—		10	0
Stenhousemuir	2024–25	Scottish League One	13	0	—		—		—		13	0
Career total			98	7	5	0	9	1	11	1	168	9
