= Lewis Vaughan =

Scottish footballer

Personal information
- Date of birth: 19 December 1995 (age 30)
- Place of birth: Edinburgh, Scotland
- Positions: Forward; winger

Team information
- Current team: Raith Rovers
- Number: 10

Youth career
- 2008–2011: Raith Rovers
- Heart of Midlothian
- Leith Athletic

Senior career*
| Years | Team | Apps | (Gls) |
| 2011– | Raith Rovers | 237 | (84) |
| 2017 | → Dumbarton (loan) | 15 | (4) |
- * Club domestic league appearances and goals as of 09:54, 10 January 2024 (UTC)

Lewis Vaughan (born 19 December 1995) is a Scottish footballer who plays as a forward for Scottish Championship club Raith Rovers.

== Career ==
Vaughan started as an under-14 player for Raith Rovers, progressing up the age groups and breaking into the under-19 team.

On 11 January 2012 Vaughan was given a 2 1/2-year professional contract by Raith Rovers, making his debut for the first-team as a sub in the 87th minute in the final match of season 2011–12 season away to Greenock Morton.

On 4 January 2017, Vaughan signed a one-year contract extension with Raith, and on the same date joined fellow Scottish Championship side Dumbarton on loan until the end of the 2016–17 season. He scored his first goal for he Sons with a solo effort in a 2–2 away draw with Falkirk in February 2017. He scored his fourth goal for the club against Dundee United in a 2–2 draw on 29 April 2017, a result that almost guaranteed Dumbarton's safety with one match to spare.

On 19 January 2019, Vaughan scored a second half hat-trick in a 3–0 win over Dunfermline Athletic in the Scottish Cup – his first professional career hat trick.

Vaughan has suffered four ACL injuries (two to his right knee and two to his left) in August 2015, January 2019, September 2019 and August 2021, missing several months each time after being operated on. He returned from the fourth rehabilitation in November 2022.

He was awarded a testimonial match in March 2024. That season he played over 40 times as Raith reached the Scottish Premiership promotion play-offs, but at the start of the 2024–25 season he had more injury problems, with a groin issue followed by a hamstring tear which required surgery.

== Career statistics ==
As of 1 July 2024

Appearances and goals by club, season and competition
| Club | Season | League | | | Scottish Cup | | League Cup | | Other | | Total | |
| Club | Season | Division | Apps | Goals | Apps | Goals | Apps | Goals | Apps | Goals | Apps | Goals |
|---|---|---|---|---|---|---|---|---|---|---|---|---|
| Raith Rovers | 2011–12 | Scottish First Division | 1 | 0 | 0 | 0 | 0 | 0 | 0 | 0 | 1 | 0 |
| Raith Rovers | 2012–13 | Scottish First Division | 3 | 0 | 0 | 0 | 0 | 0 | 0 | 0 | 3 | 0 |
| Raith Rovers | 2013–14 | Scottish Championship | 20 | 2 | 1 | 0 | 2 | 1 | 2 (Note: Appearances in the Scottish Challenge Cup) | 0 | 26 | 3 |
| Raith Rovers | 2014–15 | Scottish Championship | 21 | 7 | 2 | 0 | 2 | 0 | 1 | 0 | 26 | 7 |
| Raith Rovers | 2015–16 | Scottish Championship | 0 | 0 | 0 | 0 | 1 | 1 | 1 | 1 | 2 | 2 |
| Raith Rovers | 2016–17 | Scottish Championship | 12 | 0 | 0 | 0 | 4 | 2 | 1 | 0 | 17 | 2 |
| Raith Rovers | 2017–18 | Scottish League One | 35 | 15 | 0 | 0 | 4 | 4 | 6 (Note: 4 appearances / 4 goals in Scottish Challenge Cup; 2 appearances in the Scottish Championship play-offs) | 4 | 45 | 23 |
| Raith Rovers | 2018–19 | Scottish League One | 11 | 6 | 1 | 3 | 0 | 0 | 1 | 0 | 13 | 9 |
| Raith Rovers | 2019–20 | Scottish League One | 2 | 2 | 0 | 0 | 0 | 0 | 1 | 0 | 3 | 2 |
| Raith Rovers | 2020–21 | Scottish Championship | 10 | 2 | 2 | 1 | 1 | 0 | 4 (Note: Appearances in the Scottish Premiership play-offs) | 2 | 17 | 5 |
| Raith Rovers | 2021–22 | Scottish Championship | 1 | 2 | 0 | 0 | 4 | 2 | 0 | 0 | 5 | 4 |
| Raith Rovers | 2022–23 | Scottish Championship | 20 | 6 | 3 | 0 | 0 | 0 | 3 | 1 | 26 | 7 |
| Raith Rovers | 2023–24 | Scottish Championship | 34 | 15 | 2 | 1 | 5 | 1 | 7 (Note: 3 appearances / 1 goal in Scottish Challenge Cup; 4 appearances / 1 goal in the Scottish Premiership play-offs) | 2 | 48 | 19 |
| Raith Rovers | Total | | 171 | 57 | 11 | 5 | 23 | 11 | 27 | 10 | 285 | 105 |
| Dumbarton (loan) | 2016–17 | Scottish Championship | 15 | 4 | 0 | 0 | 0 | 0 | 0 | 0 | 15 | 4 |
| Career total | | | 186 | 61 | 11 | 5 | 23 | 11 | 27 | 10 | 300 | 109 |

== Honours ==
Raith Rovers

- Scottish League One: 2019–20
- Scottish Challenge Cup: 2013- 14, 2021–22, 2025–26
