= John Frederiksen =

Faroese-Danish footballer (born 1996)

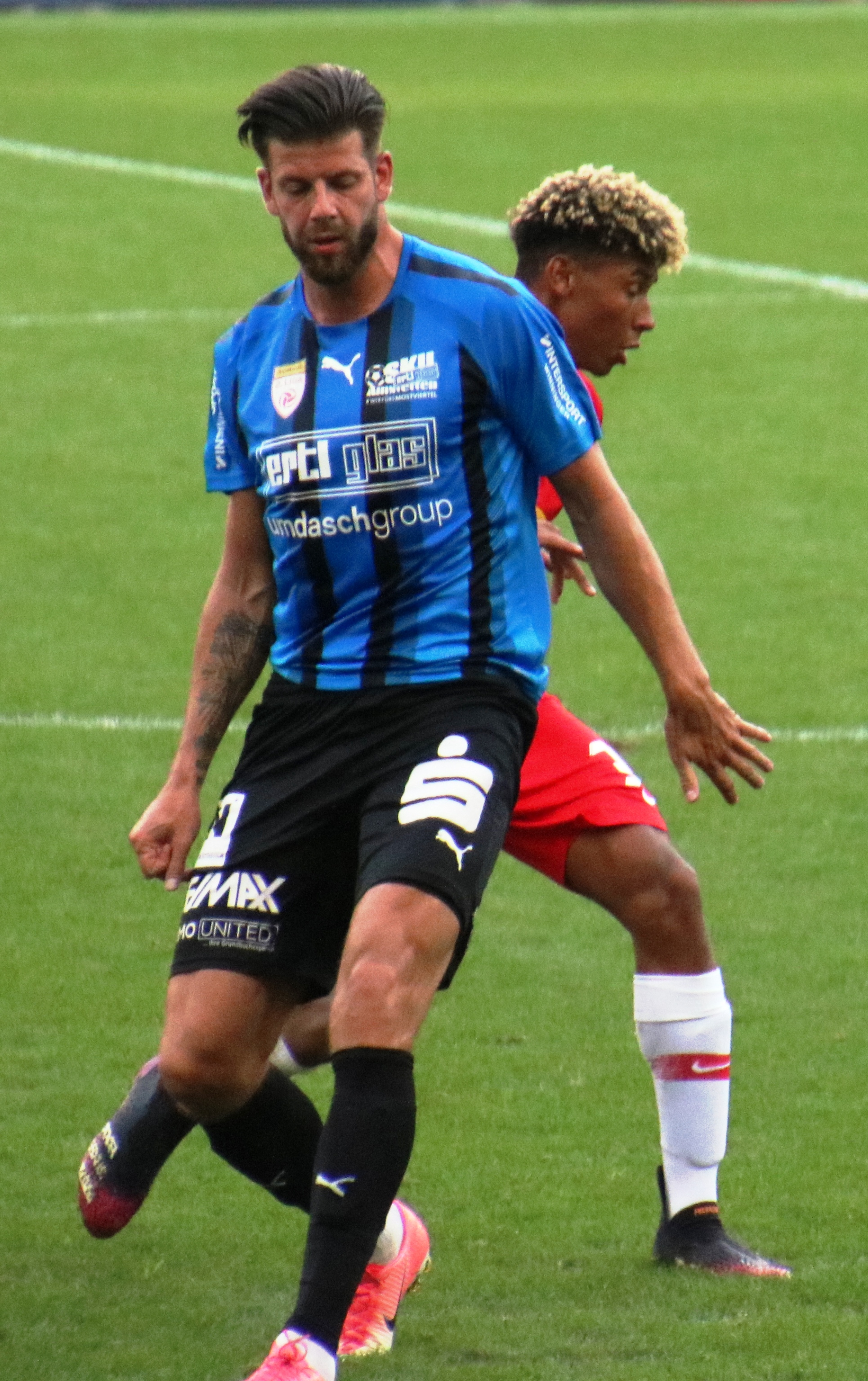
- Frederiksen in 2021

Personal information
- Full name: John Johannesen Frederiksen
- Date of birth: 10 January 1996 (age 30)
- Place of birth: Nexø, Denmark
- Height: 2.02 m (6 ft 8 in)
- Position: Forward

Team information
- Current team: Brabrand

Youth career
- 1999–2010: NB Bornholm
- 2010–2011: Midtbornholm
- 2012: Ikast
- 2013: Copenhagen

Senior career*
Years	Team	Apps	(Gls)
2013–2014	NB Bornholm		
2014–2017	Fredensborg		
2017	07 Vestur	13	(6)
2018	HB	16	(2)
2019	Frem		
2019	Skovshoved	13	(5)
2020–2021	MuSa	22	(11)
2021–2022	SKU Amstetten	28	(5)
2022–2023	Raith Rovers	9	(1)
2023	Arendal	16	(1)
2024	Thisted	8	(0)
2025	Brabrand	9	(0)
2026–	NB Bornholm	6	(6)

International career^{‡}
2012	Faroe Islands U17	1	(0)
2014	Faroe Islands U-19	3	(0)
2021–	Faroe Islands	4	(0)
- * Club domestic league appearances and goals as of 18 June 2026 ‡ National team caps and goals as of 18 November 2021

John Johannesen Frederiksen (born 10 January 1996) is a Faroese professional footballer who plays as a forward for Danish 2nd Division side Brabrand. Born in Denmark, he represents Faroe Islands internationally.

== Club career ==
At the age of 15, Frederiksen auditioned for Danish television show Drengedrømmen. As a youth player, he joined the youth academy of FCK, one of Denmark's most successful clubs.

Frederiksen started his career with Danish fourth division side Bornholm. After that, he signed for Fredensborg in the Danish third division. In 2017, Frederiksen signed for Faroese team 07 Vestur. Before the second half of 2018–19, he signed for Frem in Denmark.

In 2020, Frederiksen signed for Finnish outfit Musan Salama in second-tier Ykkönen, after trialing in Slovakia and receiving offers from Belarus, Romania, Tunisia, and Turkey. On 25 July 2020, he debuted for MuSa during a 5–1 win over Gnistan, scoring 3 goals.

In 2021, he was diagnosed with a brain tumor. After that, Frederiksen signed for SKU Amstetten in Austria. On 23 July 2021, Frederiksen debuted for SKU Amstetten during a 1–1 draw with FAC. On 7 October 2022, Raith Rovers announced the signing of Frederiksen on a short-term deal. Frederiksen would score his first goal for Raith in a Scottish Challenge Cup win over Queen's Park. Frederiksen would leave Raith by mutual consent on 31 January 2023.

On 13 April, Arendal announced the signing of Frederiksen.

In March 2024, Frederiksen signed for Danish 2nd Division club Thisted FC. Frederiksen left the club after the season and temporarily moved back to Bornholm, where he started as a personal coach for youth players.

On 7 August 2025, Frederiksen signed for Danish 2nd Division side Brabrand IF.

== International career ==
Frederiksen made his debut for the Faroe Islands national team on 4 September 2021 in a World Cup qualifier against Denmark, a 1–0 home loss. He substituted Jóan Símun Edmundsson in the 90th minute.
