= Callum Smith (footballer) =

Scottish footballer (born 1999)

Personal information
- Date of birth: 13 November 1999 (age 26)
- Place of birth: Cowdenbeath, Scotland
- Position: Forward

Team information
- Current team: Queen's Park
- Number: 27

Youth career
- 2013–2014: Dunfermline Athletic
- 2014–2016: Fife Elite Football Academy
- 2016–2017: Dunfermline Athletic

Senior career*
Years	Team	Apps	(Gls)
2017–2020	Dunfermline Athletic	18	(2)
2018	→ Alloa Athletic (loan)	14	(1)
2018	→ Arbroath (loan)	9	(0)
2019–2020	→ Airdrieonians (loan)	27	(4)
2020–2021	Hamilton Academical	24	(2)
2021–2023	Airdrieonians	66	(22)
2023–2025	Raith Rovers	53	(6)
2026–	Queen's Park	17	(1)

International career^{‡}
2017	Scotland U19	5	(2)
- * Club domestic league appearances and goals as of 4 May 2026 ‡ National team caps and goals as of 21:52, 14 November 2017 (UTC)

Callum Smith (born 13 November 1999) is a Scottish professional footballer who plays as a forward for Queen's Park. Smith has previously played for Alloa Athletic, Arbroath, Hamilton Academical, Dunfermline Athletic and Airdrieonians.

== Career ==
Smith was educated at Beath High School and began his career with Cowdenbeath's youth squad, before moving to Dunfermline Athletic, nicknamed the Pars, to join the Under 15s side. Smith then continued his development with the Fife Elite Football Academy, after the amalgamation of Fife's football clubs' youth sides into one academy. In 2016, Smith returned to the Pars, signing a one-year contract with the club to play for the side's development squad. His first appearance for the first-team came in the Scottish League Cup, where he came on as a 78th-minute substitute for Michael Moffat in the 5–1 loss to Inverness Caledonian Thistle at East End Park. Smith impressed with his performances for the youth side, becoming the club's top scorer in the SPFL Development League, which resulted in him making his first league appearance against Greenock Morton. Smith replaced Nicky Clark in the 82nd minute, and made an immediate impact, setting up Rhys McCabe, assisting in Dunfermline's third goal.

With the club deciding not to participate in the 2017–18 SPFL Development League, Smith was promoted to the first team for the 2017–18 season. He played in all four Scottish League Cup group stage matches, scoring his first goal for the Pars in a 6–0 win against Elgin City. His full debut came in the final match of the group stage against Hearts at Tynecastle. With main striker Nicky Clark injured, Smith started alongside Declan McManus, who he provided an assist for to put the Pars 2–1 ahead. Smith joined Scottish League One club Alloa Athletic on loan at the end of January 2018, helping the side to a third-place finish and victory in the Championship play-offs over Dumbarton.

In August 2018, Smith joined League One club Arbroath on a season long loan; despite being sidelined for two months with an injury, he made nine appearances before his loan was cut short in January 2019. At the beginning of the 2019–20 season, Smith moved on a season-long loan to Airdrieonians as part of a deal that saw Josh Edwards sign for Dunfermline.

Smith left Dunfermline after the curtailed 2019–20 season, and signed a two-year contract with Hamilton Academical in June 2020. He scored his first goal for Hamilton in a 3–0 win over Motherwell on 2 January 2021.

He joined Airdrieonians on 5 August 2021, and helped them win promotion to the Championship in 2022–23.

Raith Rovers signed Smith on a two-year contract in June 2023.

On 3 January 2026, Smith signed for Scottish Championship side Queen's Park.

== Personal life ==
Smith's younger brother Connor is also a footballer – they came up against one another in the Scottish Championship Promotion play-off final in both the 2021–22 (Queen's Park, with Connor on loan and among the scorers, defeated Callum's Airdrie) and 2022–23 seasons (Airdrie overcame Hamilton aided by a goal from Callum in the first leg against his former club; Connor levelled the tie for the opposition in the return, and the outcome was settled on penalties).

== Career statistics ==
As of 15 March 2025

Club statistics
Club	Season	League			Scottish Cup		League Cup		Other		Total	
Club	Season	Division	Apps	Goals	Apps	Goals	Apps	Goals	Apps	Goals	Apps	Goals
Dunfermline Athletic	2016–17	Scottish Championship	2	0	0	0	1	0	0	0	3	0
Dunfermline Athletic	2017–18	Scottish Championship	13	2	0	0	4	1	2 (Note: Appearances in the Scottish Challenge Cup)	0	19	3
Dunfermline Athletic	2018–19	Scottish Championship	3	0	0	0	0	0	1	1	4	1
Dunfermline Athletic	2019–20	Scottish Championship	0	0	0	0	0	0	0	0	0	0
Dunfermline Athletic	Total		18	2	0	0	5	1	3	1	26	4
Alloa Athletic (loan)	2017–18	Scottish League One	14	1	0	0	0	0	4 (Note: Appearances in the Scottish Championship play-offs)	0	18	1
Arbroath (loan)	2018–19	Scottish League One	9	0	0	0	0	0	0	0	9	0
Airdrieonians (loan)	2019–20	Scottish League One	27	4	2	0	3	1	3	1	35	6
Hamilton Academical	2020–21	Scottish Premiership	23	2	0	0	3	0	0	0	26	2
Hamilton Academical	2021–22	Scottish Championship	1	0	0	0	4	2	0	0	5	2
Hamilton Academical	Total		24	2	0	0	7	2	0	0	31	4
Airdrieonians	2021–22	Scottish League One	31	12	2	1	0	0	5 (Note: One appearance and one goal in the Scottish Challenge Cup, four appearances and three goals in the Scottish Championship play-offs)	4	38	17
Airdrieonians	2022–23	Scottish League One	35	10	1	1	4	0	5 (Note: One appearance in the Scottish Challenge Cup, four appearances and two goals in the Scottish Championship play-offs)	2	45	13
Airdrieonians	Total		66	22	3	2	4	0	10	6	83	30
Raith Rovers	2023–24	Scottish Championship	34	6	2	0	5	2	8 (Note: Four appearances and one goal in the Scottish Challenge Cup, four appearances in the Scottish Premiership play-offs)	1	49	9
Raith Rovers	2024–25	Scottish Championship	11	0	0	0	4	1	1	1	16	2
Raith Rovers	Total		45	6	2	0	9	3	9	2	65	11
Career total			203	37	7	2	28	7	29	10	267	56
