= Jamie Gullan =

Scottish footballer (born 1999)

Personal information
- Date of birth: 2 July 1999 (age 27)
- Place of birth: Edinburgh, Scotland
- Height: 1.80 m (5 ft 11 in)
- Position: Striker

Team information
- Current team: St Johnstone
- Number: 10

Youth career
- –2015: Heart of Midlothian
- 2015–2018: Hibernian

Senior career*
Years	Team	Apps	(Gls)
2017–2022	Hibernian	27	(1)
2017	→ Gala Fairydean Rovers (loan)		
2018	→ Queen's Park (loan)	7	(0)
2019	→ Raith Rovers (loan)	10	(1)
2019–2020	→ Raith Rovers (loan)	18	(10)
2021	→ Raith Rovers (loan)	12	(4)
2022–2024	Raith Rovers	43	(6)
2024	Dundalk	31	(6)
2025	Raith Rovers	17	(4)
2025–	St Johnstone	33	(11)
- * Club domestic league appearances and goals as of 4 May 2026

Jamie Gullan (born 2 July 1999) is a Scottish professional footballer who plays as a striker for Scottish Premiership club St Johnstone. Gullan has previously played for Hibernian, where he spent loan spells with Gala Fairydean Rovers, Queen's Park and Raith Rovers, before joining Raith permanently in 2022. He spent 2024 with League of Ireland Premier Division club Dundalk.

== Career ==
=== Hibernian ===
Gullan was in the Heart of Midlothian youth system, but was released and he then signed with Hibernian. During the 2017–18 season he played for the Hibs development team, and he was also loaned to Gala Fairydean Rovers and Queen's Park He scored one of the goals as Hibs won the 2017–18 Scottish Youth Cup final against Aberdeen.

He made his first team debut for Hibernian in July 2018, in a 2018–19 UEFA Europa League qualifier against Faroese club NSI Runavik. In February 2019, Gullan was loaned to Scottish League One club Raith Rovers. Gullan scored his first goal for Raith on 7 May 2019, in a playoff match against Forfar Athletic. He returned to Raith on loan in August 2019. Gullan scored nine goals for Raith during this second spell, which helped to put them top of the 2019–20 Scottish League One table in early January. The clubs agreed to extend the loan by one week during January 2020.

Gullan returned to Hibs for the second part of the 2019–20 season, acting as cover for Christian Doidge and Marc McNulty. Gullan scored his first goal for Hibs on 28 February 2020, netting the fifth in a 5–2 Scottish Cup quarter-final win against Inverness Caledonian Thistle.

On 1 February 2021, Gullan joined Raith Rovers on loan until the end of the season. He scored two of the goals in a 5–1 Fife derby win against Dunfermline on 30 March.

On 22 August 2021, Gullan made his first competitive appearance back at Hibernian following his loan spell with Raith Rovers, he came off the bench in the game which saw Hibernian draw 2–2 with Dundee away from home.

=== Raith Rovers ===
On 6 January 2022, Gullan signed for Raith Rovers permanently on a two-and-a-half-year deal for an undisclosed fee. He left for Irish side Dundalk in January 2024 for an undisclosed fee.

=== St Johnstone ===
On 30 May 2025, Gullan joined Scottish Championship club St Johnstone on a two-year deal.

== Career statistics ==
As of match played on 20 August 2022

Appearances and goals by club, season and competition
Club	Season	League			Scottish Cup		League Cup		Other		Total	
Club	Season	Division	Apps	Goals	Apps	Goals	Apps	Goals	Apps	Goals	Apps	Goals
Hibernian	2017–18	Scottish Premiership	0	0	0	0	0	0	—		0	0
Hibernian	2018–19 (Note: Soccerbase did not record an appearance made by Gullan against NSI Runavik on 19 July 2018.)	Scottish Premiership	2	0	0	0	0	0	1 (Note: Appearance in UEFA Europa League)	0	3	0
Hibernian	2019–20	Scottish Premiership	5	0	2	1	0	0	—		7	1
Hibernian	2020–21	Scottish Premiership	14	0	0	0	6	2	—		20	2
Hibernian	2021–22	Scottish Premiership	6	0	0	0	1	0	0	0	7	0
Hibernian	Total		27	0	2	1	7	2	1	0	37	3
Queen's Park (loan)	2017–18	Scottish League One	7	0	0	0	0	0	1	0	8	0
Raith Rovers (loan)	2018–19	Scottish League One	10	0	0	0	0	0	4	1	14	1
Raith Rovers (loan)	2019–20	Scottish League One	18	9	0	0	0	0	0	0	18	9
Raith Rovers (loan)	2020–21	Scottish Championship	12	4	2	0	0	0	2 (Note: Appearance in Scottish Premiership play-offs)	0	16	4
Raith Rovers (loan)	Total		40	13	2	0	0	0	6	1	48	14
Hibernian Under-20s
Hibernian Under-20s	2018–19		—						1	0	1	0
Hibernian Under-20s	2019–20		—						1	1	1	1
Hibernian Under-20s	Total		—						2	1	2	1
Raith Rovers	2021–22	Scottish Championship	9	1	2	0	0	0	0	0	11	1
Raith Rovers	2022–23	Scottish Championship	4	1	0	0	4	1	0	0	8	2
Raith Rovers	Total		13	2	2	0	4	1	0	0	19	3
Career total			87	15	6	1	11	3	10	2	114	21

== Honours ==
St Johnstone

- Scottish Championship: 2025–26
