= Aidan Connolly =

Scottish footballer (born 1995)

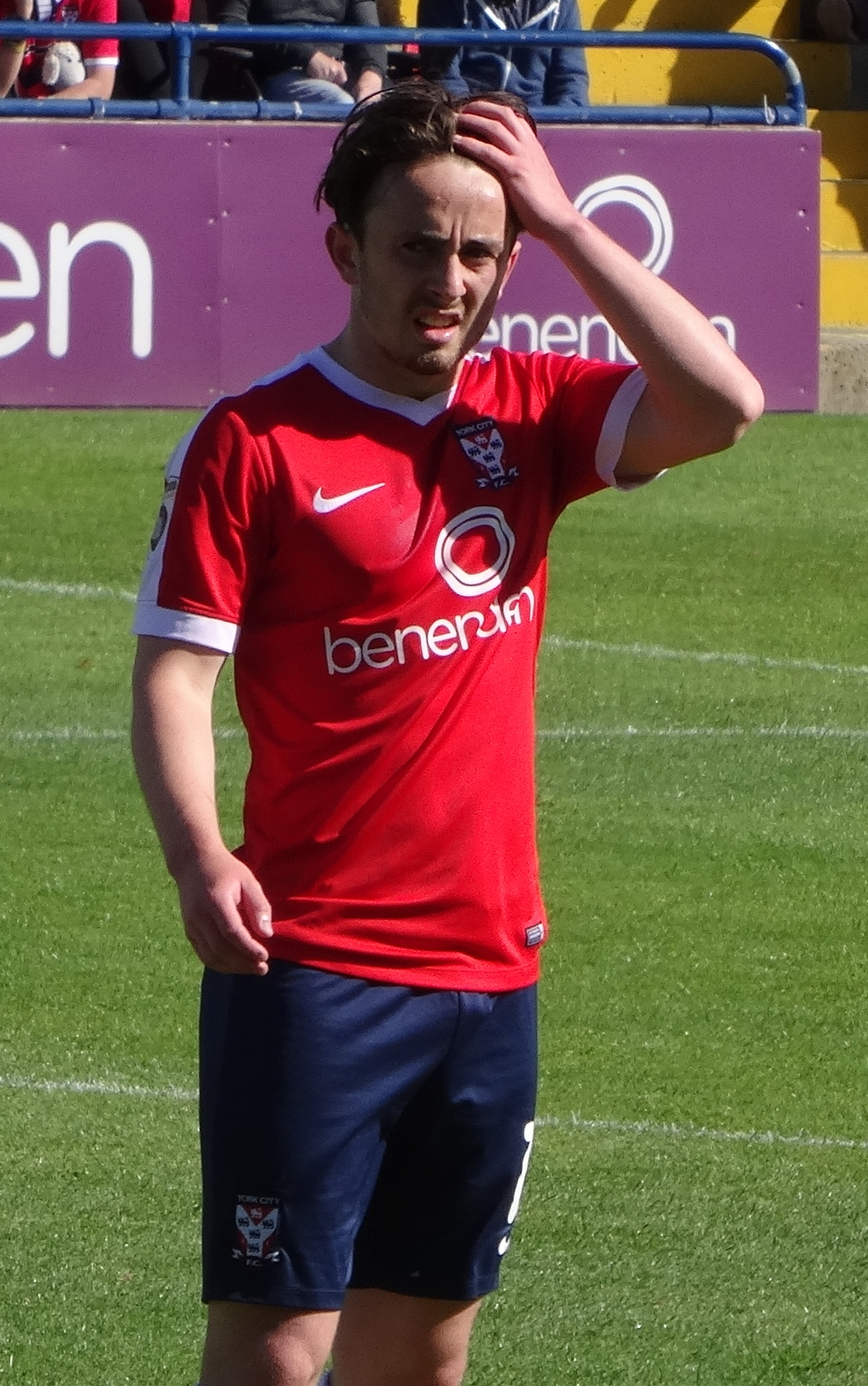
- Connolly playing for York City in 2016

Personal information
- Full name: Aidan Charles Patrick Connolly
- Date of birth: 15 August 1995 (age 31)
- Place of birth: Dundee, Scotland
- Height: 5 ft 5 in (1.65 m)
- Position: Winger

Team information
- Current team: Queen's Park
- Number: 11

Youth career
- –2012: Queen's Park

Senior career*
Years	Team	Apps	(Gls)
2012–2013	Queen's Park	23	(6)
2013–2016	Dundee United	31	(1)
2013	→ Brechin City (loan)	4	(0)
2016	Raith Rovers	16	(5)
2016–2018	York City	50	(9)
2018–2019	Dunfermline Athletic	17	(1)
2019–2021	Falkirk	30	(5)
2021–2025	Raith Rovers	116	(24)
2025–	Queen's Park	35	(4)

International career
2010	Scotland U16	1	(0)
2013	Scotland U19	1	(0)
- * Club domestic league appearances and goals as of 4 May 2026

Aidan Charles Patrick Connolly (born 15 August 1995) is a Scottish professional footballer who plays as a winger for Scottish Championship club Queen's Park.

Connolly began his career with Queen's Park before joining Dundee United in 2013, and also played for Brechin City on loan. He was released by Dundee United in January 2016, joining Raith Rovers shortly after. He spent two seasons with York City from 2016 to 2018, and one year with Dunfermline Athletic. He has represented Scotland at under-16 and under-19 level.

== Early life ==
Connolly was born in Dundee on 15 August 1995, when his father Paddy Connolly was playing for Dundee United. He attended Williamwood High School in Clarkston, East Renfrewshire.

== Club career ==
Connolly started his career at Queen's Park, progressing through the club's youth system. He made his first-team debut in November 2012 whilst still at school. He was voted Scottish Football League Young Player of the Month for December 2012 after scoring three times since his first appearance.

Together with Queen's Park teammate Andrew Robertson, Connolly signed for Scottish Premiership club Dundee United in June 2013. He was sent out on a one-month loan to Brechin City in September 2013. After returning from Brechin, Connolly made his Dundee United debut as a late substitute in a 3–1 victory over Motherwell. At the start of the following season he signed a one-year contract extension to keep him at the club until 2016. Connolly made his first start and scored his first goal for Dundee United against Hibernian in the Scottish League Cup on 29 October 2014. Retaining his place in the next match against St Mirren, he contributed to all three of United's goals on his first Premiership start.

After making only one starting appearance during the 2015–16 season, Connolly was released from his Dundee United contract by mutual consent on 21 January 2016. The following day, he joined Scottish Championship club Raith Rovers on a contract until the end of 2015–16.

On 28 June 2016, Connolly joined newly relegated National League club York City on a two-year contract, having previously played under manager Jackie McNamara at Dundee United. On 21 May 2017, he came on as a 69th-minute substitute as York beat Macclesfield Town 3–2 at Wembley Stadium in the 2017 FA Trophy Final, scoring the winning goal in the 86th minute after forcing Jon Parkin's shot over the line from centimetres out. Connolly was released by York at the end of 2017–18.

Connolly signed for Scottish Championship club Dunfermline Athletic on 20 June 2018 on a one-year contract. He left the club at the end of his contract and signed for League One club Falkirk under his former Raith manager, Ray McKinnon.

In 2021, Connolly returned to Raith Rovers on a two-year deal. After two successful seasons during which he was a vital player for the team, Connolly signed a new two-year deal in 2023, keeping him with Rovers until 2025.

In 2025, after the expiration of his deal at Raith Rovers, Connolly returned his first club Queen's Park, now a Scottish Championship side, on a permanent deal.

== International career ==
Connolly made one appearance for the Scotland under-16 team, against Jersey in 2010, and one for the under-19 team, against Latvia in 2013.

== Career statistics ==
As of 6 May 2019

Appearances and goals by club, season and competition
Club	Season	League			National Cup (Note: Includes Scottish Cup)		League Cup (Note: Includes Scottish League Cup)		Other		Total	
Club	Season	Division	Apps	Goals	Apps	Goals	Apps	Goals	Apps	Goals	Apps	Goals
Queen's Park	2012–13	Scottish Third Division	23	6	0	0	0	0	2 (Note: Appearances in Scottish Second Division play-offs)	0	25	6
Dundee United	2013–14	Scottish Premiership	2	0	0	0	0	0	—		2	0
Dundee United	2014–15	Scottish Premiership	18	1	3	0	1	1	—		22	2
Dundee United	2015–16	Scottish Premiership	11	0	0	0	0	0	—		11	0
Dundee United	Total		31	1	3	0	1	1	—		35	2
Brechin City (loan)	2013–14	Scottish League One	4	0	—		—		—		4	0
Raith Rovers	2015–16	Scottish Championship	16	5	—		—		1 (Note: Appearance in Scottish Premiership play-offs)	0	17	5
York City	2016–17	National League	20	3	0	0	—		4 (Note: Appearances in FA Trophy)	2	24	5
York City	2017–18	National League North	30	6	0	0	—		2	0	32	6
York City	Total		50	9	0	0	—		6	2	56	11
Dunfermline Athletic	2018–19	Scottish Championship	17	1	0	0	5	0	3 (Note: Appearances in Scottish Challenge Cup)	0	25	1
Queen's Park	2025-Present	Scottish Championship	13	1			4				18	1
Career total			141	22	3	0	6	1	12	2	162	25

== Honours ==
York City

- FA Trophy: 2016–17

Individual

- Scottish Football League Young Player of the Month: December 2012
