= Dylan Easton =

Scottish footballer (born 1994)

Personal information
- Date of birth: 6 April 1994 (age 32)
- Place of birth: Edinburgh, Scotland
- Height: 5 ft 6 in (1.68 m)
- Position: Attacking midfielder

Team information
- Current team: Raith Rovers
- Number: 23

Youth career
- Hutchison Vale
- 2011–2012: Livingston

Senior career*
Years	Team	Apps	(Gls)
2012–2013	Livingston	6	(0)
2013	Berwick Rangers	17	(2)
2013–2015	St Johnstone	0	(0)
2014–2015	→ Arbroath (loan)	3	(0)
2015	→ Dumbarton (loan)	13	(0)
2015–2016	Elgin City	22	(3)
2016–2017	Clyde	5	(1)
2017–2019	Forfar Athletic	66	(11)
2019–2021	Kelty Hearts	20	(12)
2021–2022	Airdrieonians	34	(8)
2022–	Raith Rovers	137	(33)
- * Club domestic league appearances and goals as of 4 May 2026

Dylan Easton (born 6 April 1994) is a Scottish footballer who plays as an attacking midfielder or second striker for Scottish Championship club Raith Rovers.

Easton has previously played with Livingston, Berwick Rangers, St Johnstone, Elgin City, Clyde and Forfar Athletic, Kelty Hearts, Airdrieonians, as well as Arbroath and Dumbarton on loan.

== Career ==
=== Livingston ===
Easton signed for Livingston in July 2011 from Hutchison Vale. A member of their under 19 squad, he made his first team debut aged 17 as a substitute against Partick Thistle on 11 February 2012.

=== St Johnstone ===
In 2013, Easton signed a pre-contract agreement with Scottish Premier League club St Johnstone. Easton left the club by mutual consent in August 2015.

==== Dumbarton (loan) ====
He joined Dumbarton on loan in January 2015 and made his debut in a 5–1 defeat to Livingston.

=== Elgin City ===
In October 2015, Easton signed a contract agreement until the summer 2016 after he left St Johnstone by mutual consent in August 2015. Easton's attacking instincts produced many goal assists during his short time with the club. He was a fans favourite with several his fine displays, and was one of the star players of the season. Easton helped to lead the club to a 2nd-place finish and the promotion the play-offs. He was also named in the Ladbrokes Scottish League Two Team of the Season for 2015–16.

=== Clyde ===
On 28 May 2016, it was announced that Easton had signed for Scottish League Two club Clyde. After a positive start to his career at Clyde, Easton was ruled out for an extended period after rupturing his cruciate ligament in Clyde's 3–2 win over Arbroath. However, Easton still managed to win Clyde FC Goal of the Season 2016–17. The midfielder's excellent strike against Montrose in August was the most popular from a shortlist of six, in an online vote. The goal was also included in the shortlist for the PFA Scotland Goal of the Season. He left Clyde in June 2017.

=== Forfar Athletic ===
He signed a two-year contract with Forfar Athletic on 20 June 2017.

=== Kelty Hearts ===
Easton joined Lowland League club Kelty Hearts in June 2019.

=== Airdrieonians ===
On 11 June 2021, Easton signed for Scottish League One side Airdrieonians.

Easton helped the side to the Championship play offs scoring 8 goals and 12 assists, making him the highest assister in League 1. He won Airdrieonians Player of the Season and the Scottish PFA League 1 player of the year as well as being named in Scotlands PFA League 1 Team of the Year.

=== Raith Rovers ===
On 26 May 2022, Easton joined Scottish Championship side Raith Rovers on a 2-year deal.

== Career statistics ==
As of match played 11 May 2019

Appearances and goals by club, season and competition
Club	Season	League			Scottish Cup		League Cup		Other		Total	
Club	Season	Division	Apps	Goals	Apps	Goals	Apps	Goals	Apps	Goals	Apps	Goals
Livingston	2011–12	Scottish First Division	2	0	0	0	0	0	0	0	2	0
Livingston	2012–13	Scottish First Division	4	0	0	0	2	1	0	0	6	1
Livingston	Livingston total		6	0	0	0	2	1	0	0	8	1
Berwick Rangers	2012–13	Scottish Third Division	16	2	0	0	0	0	2 (Note: Appearances in the Second Division play-offs)	0	18	2
St Johnstone	2013–14	Scottish Premiership	0	0	0	0	0	0	0	0	0	0
Arbroath (loan)	2014–15	Scottish League Two	3	0	0	0	0	0	0	0	3	0
Dumbarton (loan)	2014–15	Scottish Championship	13	0	0	0	0	0	0	0	13	0
Elgin City	2015–16	Scottish League Two	22	3	2	0	0	0	2 (Note: Appearances in the League One play-offs)	0	26	3
Clyde	2016–17	Scottish League Two	5	1	0	0	4	1	0	0	9	2
Forfar Athletic	2017–18	Scottish League One	32	5	1	0	3	0	1 (Note: Appearance in the Scottish Challenge Cup)	0	37	5
Forfar Athletic	2018–19	Scottish League One	34	6	1	0	4	1	3 (Note: One appearance in the Scottish Challenge Cup and two in the Championship play-offs)	0	42	7
Forfar Athletic	Forfar Athletic total		66	11	2	0	7	1	4	0	79	12
Career total			131	17	4	0	13	3	8	0	156	20

== Honours ==
Kelty Hearts

- Lowland League: 2019–20

Raith Rovers

- Scottish Challenge Cup: 2025–26

Individual

- PFA Scotland Players' Player of the Year: 2020–21 Scottish League One
