= Ethan Ross (footballer, born 2001) =

Scottish footballer

Personal information
- Full name: Ethan Ross
- Date of birth: 15 August 2001 (age 25)
- Place of birth: Inverurie, Scotland
- Height: 5 ft 8 in (1.73 m)
- Position: Midfielder

Team information
- Current team: Falkirk
- Number: 23

Youth career
- 2011–2019: Aberdeen

Senior career*
Years	Team	Apps	(Gls)
2019–2021	Aberdeen	8	(0)
2020	→ Dunfermline Athletic (loan)	8	(0)
2020–2021	→ Raith Rovers (loan)	11	(2)
2021–2024	Raith Rovers	32	(6)
2023–2024	→ Falkirk (loan)	31	(1)
2024–	Falkirk	109	(12)

International career^{‡}
2017–2018	Scotland U17	8	(1)
2018–2019	Scotland U18	2	(1)
2019–	Scotland U19	6	(1)
- * Club domestic league appearances and goals as of 20 May 2026 ‡ National team caps and goals as of 20 February 2020

Ethan Ross (born 15 August 2001) is a Scottish professional footballer who plays as a midfielder for Scottish Premiership club Falkirk. He has previously played for Aberdeen and had previous loan spells at Dunfermline Athletic and Raith Rovers.

== Career ==
=== Aberdeen ===
Ross joined Aberdeen when he was 10 years old, and was the captain of their Under-18 side. He made his first team debut for Aberdeen on 29 January 2019, coming off the bench at Stenhousemuir in a Scottish Cup replay. On 9 March 2019, he made his league debut, again coming off the bench in an away match against Celtic. He signed a new two-year contract in May 2019.

Ross joined Dunfermline Athletic on loan in January 2020.

=== Raith Rovers ===
In October 2020, Ross signed for Raith Rovers on loan. He was recalled by Aberdeen in January 2021. Ross was offered a new contract by Aberdeen, but he decided to leave the club at the end of the 2020/21 season.

On 14 October 2021, Ross signed for Raith Rovers on a permanent deal. Having failed to sign a contract at Southampton and agreeing a compensation fee with former club Aberdeen, he became an "immediate impact" at Raith scoring three goals in his first six matches.

=== Falkirk ===
In 2023, he joined Falkirk on a season-long loan deal, won Scottish League One and then signed on a permanent deal in June 2024.

== Career statistics ==
As of match played 4 March 2025

Appearances and goals by club, season and competition
Club	Season	League			Scottish Cup		League Cup		Continental		Other		Total	
Club	Season	Division	Apps	Goals	Apps	Goals	Apps	Goals	Apps	Goals	Apps	Goals	Apps	Goals
Aberdeen	2018-19	Scottish Premiership	4	0	1	0	0	0	0	0	—		5	0
Aberdeen	2019-20	Scottish Premiership	2	0	0	0	0	0	0	0	—		2	0
Aberdeen	2020-21	Scottish Premiership	2	0	3	0	0	0	0	0	—		5	0
Aberdeen	Total		8	0	4	0	0	0	0	0	—		12	0
Aberdeen U21	2017-18	—			—		—		—		0	0	0	0
Aberdeen U21	2018-19	—			—		—		—		1 (Note: Appearance(s) in Scottish Challenge Cup)	0	1	0
Aberdeen U21	2019-20	—			—		—		—		1	0	1	0
Aberdeen U21	Total		—		—		—		—		2	0	2	0
Dunfermline Athletic (loan)	2019-20	Scottish Championship	8	0	0	0	0	0	—		0	0	8	0
Raith Rovers (loan)	2020-21	Scottish Championship	11	2	0	0	4	0	—		0	0	15	2
Raith Rovers	2021-22	Scottish Championship	25	5	3	1	0	0	—		3	1	31	7
Raith Rovers	2022-23	Scottish Championship	20	1	2	0	4	0	—		3	0	29	1
Raith Rovers	2023-24	Scottish Championship	3	0	0	0	1	0	—		1	0	5	0
Raith Rovers	Total		48	6	5	1	5	0	—		7	1	65	8
Falkirk (loan)	2023-24	Scottish League One	31	1	2	1	0	0	—		0	0	33	2
Falkirk	2024-25	Scottish Championship	36	8	1	0	6	1	—		1	0	44	9
Falkirk	2025-26	Scottish Premiership	29	1	3	0	4	2	—		0	0	36	3
Falkirk	2026-27	Scottish Premiership	13	2	0	0	4	0	—		0	0	17	2
Falkirk	Total		109	12	6	1	14	3	—		1	0	130	16
Career total			184	20	15	2	19	3	0	0	10	1	232	26

== Personal life ==
He is the younger brother of Seb Ross who plays in midfield for Peterhead F.C; their family runs a bakery business in Inverurie.

== Honours ==
Raith Rovers

- Scottish Challenge Cup : 2021-22

Falkirk

- Scottish League One: 2023-24
- Scottish Championship: 2024-25
