= 2019–20 Raith Rovers F.C. season =

Raith Rovers
2019–20 season
- Chairman: Bill Clark
- Manager: John McGlynn
- Stadium: Stark's Park
- League 1: Winners
- Challenge Cup: Joint Winners
- League Cup: Group stage
- Scottish Cup: Fourth round
- Top goalscorer: League: Jamie Gullan (7); All: Kieron Bowie (9)
- Highest home attendance: 2,907 vs. East Fife, 26 October 2019
- Lowest home attendance: 788 vs. Peterhead, 23 July 2019
- Average home league attendance: 1,838
Home colours	Away colours

The 2019–20 season was Raith Rovers' third season in the third tier of Scottish football since being relegated from the Scottish Championship via the play-offs at the end of the 2016–17 season. Raith Rovers also competed in the Challenge Cup, League Cup, the Scottish Cup and the Fife Cup.

== Summary ==
=== Management ===
Raith were led by manager John McGlynn for the 2019–20 season for his 2nd season at the club.

== Results & fixtures ==
Win Draw Loss Postponed

=== Pre-season ===
29 June 2019 Pre-Season Friendly	Raith Rovers	1 – 0	Stirling Albion	Stark's Park
15:00	Hendry 76' (pen.)	Raith Report		Attendance: 793; Referee: Colin Steven

4 July 2019 Pre-Season Friendly	Raith Rovers	3 – 2	Hamilton Academical	Stark's Park
19:30	Hendry 24' (pen.); Bowie 35'; Hunt 42' (o.g.)	Raith Report	Oakley 55'; Mimnaugh 59'	Attendance: 823; Referee: Gavin Duncan

6 July 2019 Pre-Season Friendly	Raith Rovers	2 – 0	Spartans	Stark's Park
15:00	Anderson 16'; Trialist 37'	Raith Report		Attendance: 689; Referee: Gavin McNab

9 July 2019 Pre-Season Friendly	Raith Rovers	2 – 1	Cowdenbeath	Stark's Park
19:45	Allan 16'; Anderson 40'	Raith Report	Cox 3'	Attendance: 643; Referee: Steven Kirkland

=== Scottish League One ===
3 August 2019 League One	Dumbarton	0 – 1	Raith Rovers	C&G Systems Stadium
15:00		Raith Report	Anderson 79'	Attendance: 870; Referee: Duncan Williams

10 August 2019 League One	Raith Rovers	5 – 2	Clyde	Stark's Park
15:00	Hendry 13' (pen.); Bowie 23'; Anderson 49'; Victoria 63'; Smith 79'	Raith Report	Goodwillie 78'; Love 89'	Attendance: 1,707; Referee: Euan Anderson

17 August 2019 League One	Stranraer	3 – 2	Raith Rovers	Stair Park
15:00	McManus 16'; Dangana 83'; Elliott 85'	Raith Report	Miller 48'; Spencer 70'	Attendance: 404; Referee: Greg Aitken

24 August 2019 League One	Raith Rovers	3 – 0	Montrose	Stark's Park
15:00	Bowie 80'; Gullan 84'; Trialist 90'	Raith Report		Attendance: 1,437; Referee: Scott Lambie

31 August 2019 League One	East Fife	4 – 2	Raith Rovers	Bayview Stadium
15:00	Dowds 19'; Higgins 57'; Wallace 65'; Agnew 90'	Raith Report	Allan 10'; Gullan 84'	Attendance: 1,792; Referee: Craig Napier

14 September 2019 League One	Raith Rovers	4 – 0	Peterhead	Stark's Park
15:00	G.Anderson 7'; Miller 29', 67'; Vaughan 52'	Raith Report		Attendance: 1,436; Referee: David Lowe

21 September 2019 League One	Airdrieonians	0 – 1	Raith Rovers	Penny Cars Stadium
15:00		Raith Report	G.Anderson 55'	Attendance: 1,132; Referee: Steven Reid

28 September 2019 League One	Forfar Athletic	1 – 2	Raith Rovers	Station Park
15:00	McLean 45'	Raith Report	Vaughan 51'; MacDonald 90'	Attendance: 847; Referee: Gavin Ross

5 October 2019 League One	Raith Rovers	2 – 2	Falkirk	Stark's Park
15:00	Miller 60'; Armstrong 78'	Raith Report	Longridge 3'; Sammon 17'	Attendance: 2,750; Referee: Scott Lambie

19 October 2019 League One	Clyde	2 – 2	Raith Rovers	Broadwood Stadium
15:00	Goodwillie 54', 68'	Raith Report	Bowie 11'; Gullan 29'	Attendance: 1,202; Referee: Peter Stuart

26 October 2019 League One	Raith Rovers	1 – 1	East Fife	Stark's Park
15:00	Spencer 35'	Raith Report	Boyd 25'	Attendance: 2,907; Referee: Barry Cook

2 November 2019 League One	Peterhead	2 – 0	Raith Rovers	Balmoor Stadium
15:00	Leitch 35'; Fraser 74'	Raith Report		Attendance: 610; Referee: Gavin Ross

9 November 2019 League One	Raith Rovers	3 – 1	Stranraer	Stark's Park
15:00	Gullan 45', 60'; Baird 49'	Raith Report	Stewart 75'	Attendance: 1,364; Referee: Lloyd Wilson

26 November 2019 League One	Raith Rovers	0 – 0	Forfar Athletic	Stark's Park
19:45		Raith Report		Attendance: 975; Referee: Kevin Graham

30 November 2019 League One	Montrose	0 – 1	Raith Rovers	Links Park
15:00		Raith Report	Spencer 68'	Attendance: 780; Referee: Barry Cook

7 December 2019 League One	Raith Rovers	1 – 0	Airdrieonians	Stark's Park
15:00	Matthews 42'	Raith Report		Attendance: 1,823; Referee: Greg Aitken

14 December 2019 League One	Falkirk	1 – 1	Raith Rovers	Falkirk Stadium
15:00	McManus 58'	Raith Report	Gullan 37'	Attendance: 4,024; Referee: Gavin Ross

21 December 2019 League One	Raith Rovers	0 – 2	Dumbarton	Stark's Park
15:00		Raith Report	Crossan 28'; McGeever 40'	Attendance: 1,504; Referee: Alan Muir

28 December 2019 League One	East Fife	3 – 5	Raith Rovers	Bayview Stadium
15:00	Agnew 28'; Dowds 61'; Wallace 71'	Raith Report	Gullan 8', 90'; MacDonald 21', 37'; Tait 54'	Attendance: 1,998; Referee: Don Robertson

4 January 2020 League One	Raith Rovers	2 – 1	Peterhead	Stark's Park
15:00	Tait 9'; Gullan 24'	Raith Report	Lyle 11'	Attendance: 1,807; Referee: Gavin Ross

11 January 2020 League One	Forfar Athletic	1 – 1	Raith Rovers	Station Park
15:00	Forbes 9'	Raith Report	Baird 72'	Attendance: 832; Referee: Duncan Williams

25 January 2020 League One	Raith Rovers	4 – 3	Montrose	Stark's Park
15:00	Matthews 8'; Bowie 25', 42'; Tait 66'	Raith Report	Johnston 55'; Niang 58'; Quinn 76'	Attendance: 1,717; Referee: Gavin Ross

1 February 2020 League One	Airdrieonians	0 – 1	Raith Rovers	Penny Cars Stadium
15:00		Raith Report	Matthews 4'	Attendance: 1,296; Referee: David Dickinson

8 February 2020 League One	Stranraer	1 – 1	Raith Rovers	Stair Park
15:00	Stevenson 54'	Raith Report	Baird 36'	Attendance: 327; Referee: David Lowe

22 February 2020 League One	Raith Rovers	1 – 0	Clyde	Stark's Park
15:00	MacLean 78'	Raith Report		Attendance: 1,527; Referee: Mike Roncone

29 February 2020 League One	Dumbarton	1 – 0	Raith Rovers	C&G Systems Stadium
15:00	Carswell 90'	Raith Report		Attendance: 804; Referee: Kevin Graham

3 March 2020 League One	Raith Rovers	1 – 1	Falkirk	Stark's Park
19:45	MacLean 47'	Raith Report	McManus 69'	Attendance: 3,225; Referee: Peter Stuart

7 March 2020 League One	Raith Rovers	2 – 1	Forfar Athletic	Stark's Park
15:00	Armstrong 9'; Baird 76'	Raith Report	Coupe 90'	Attendance: 1,551; Referee: Alan Newlands

=== Scottish Challenge Cup ===
13 August 2019 Round 2	Ross County Colts	2 – 3	Raith Rovers	Global Energy Stadium
19:45	Keillor-Dunn 55'; Gallagher 83'	Raith Report	Allan 32', 35'; Matthews 89'	Attendance: 264; Referee: Graham Beaton

7 September 2019 Round 3	Raith Rovers	2 – 0	Falkirk	Stark's Park
15:00	Hendry 17' (pen.), 50' (pen.)	Raith Report		Attendance: 1,771; Referee: Greg Aitken

12 October 2019 Round 4	Raith Rovers	3 – 1	Glenavon	Stark's Park
15:00	Bowie 15'; Armstrong 32'; Allan 90'	Raith Report	Marshall 24'	Attendance: 1,301; Referee: Bryn Markham Jones

15 November 2019 Quarter-Final	Raith Rovers	3 – 2	Elgin City	Stark's Park
19:45	Bowie 6', 25'; McKay 56'	Raith Report	Hester 35'; Sutherland 84'	Attendance: 1,108; Referee: Euan Anderson

14 February 2020 Semi-Final	Partick Thistle	1 – 2	Raith Rovers	Firhill Stadium
19:45	Mansell 83'	Raith Report	Benedictus 31'; Hendry 74'	Attendance: 2,196; Referee: Alan Newlands

=== Scottish League Cup ===
==== Matches ====
13 July 2019 Group D	Raith Rovers	0 – 3	Dundee	Stark's Park
15:00		Raith Report	Nelson 14', 29' (pen.); Curran 75'	Attendance: 2,584; Referee: Lloyd Wilson

20 July 2019 Group D	Inverness CT	4 – 1	Raith Rovers	Caledonian Stadium
15:00	White 6'; Donaldson 56'; Doran 58'; Todorov 90'	Raith Report	Allan 50'	Attendance: 1,054; Referee: Gavin Ross

23 July 2019 Group D	Raith Rovers	3 – 1	Peterhead	Stark's Park
19:45	Bowie 4'; Miller 21'; Allan 80'	Raith Report	Armour 88'	Attendance: 788; Referee: Chris Fordyce

27 July 2019 Group D	Cove Rangers	3 – 0	Raith Rovers	Balmoral Stadium
15:00	Masson 45'; Antoniazzi 52'; Glass 73'	Raith Report		Attendance: 791; Referee: Craig Napier

=== Scottish Cup ===
23 November 2019 Round 3	Raith Rovers	1 – 0	Peterhead	Stark's Park
15:00	Bowie 3'	Raith Report		Attendance: 1,306; Referee: Steven Reid

18 January 2020 Round 4	Livingston	3 – 1	Raith Rovers	Tony Macaroni Arena
15:00	Lawless 77' (pen.), 90' (pen.); Dykes 78'	Raith Report		Attendance: 1,725; Referee: Alan Newlands

=== Fife Cup ===
20 August 2019 Quarter-Final	Burntisland Shipyard	0 – 4	Raith Rovers	Recreation Park
19:00		Burntisland Shipyard Report	Trialist A 5'; Trialist B 75'; Anderson 85'; Tait 88'	Attendance: 250; Referee: Scott Lambie

- Note: The Challenge Cup final was cancelled as a result of the coronavirus situation and Raith Rovers & Inverness CT declared joint winners.
- Note: The Fife Cup was declared abandoned on 22 March 2020 & league matches were declared over on 15 April 2020.

== Player statistics ==
=== Squad ===
Last updated 7 March 2020

No.	Pos	Nat	Player	Total		League 1		Challenge Cup		League Cup		Scottish Cup	
No.	Pos	Nat	Player	Apps	Goals	Apps	Goals	Apps	Goals	Apps	Goals	Apps	Goals
	GK	(Scotland) SCO	Robbie Thomson	6	0	5+0	0	1+0	0	0+0	0	0+0	0
	GK	(Scotland) SCO	David McGurn	13	0	10+1	0	1+0	0	1+0	0	0+0	0
	GK	(Scotland) SCO	Ross Munro	22	0	13+1	0	3+0	0	3+0	0	2+0	0
	DF	(Scotland) SCO	Kyle Benedictus	36	1	26+1	0	4+0	1	3+0	0	2+0	0
	DF	(Scotland) SCO	Iain Davidson	33	0	22+0	0	4+1	0	4+0	0	2+0	0
	DF	(Scotland) SCO	David McKay	21	1	10+3	0	3+1	1	2+0	0	2+0	0
	DF	(Scotland) SCO	Jamie Watson	10	0	5+2	0	1+0	0	1+1	0	0+0	0
	DF	(Scotland) SCO	Kieran MacDonald	39	3	28+0	3	4+1	0	4+0	0	2+0	0
	DF	(Scotland) SCO	Michael Miller	26	5	19+0	4	3+0	0	2+1	1	1+0	0
	DF	(France) FRA	Fernandy Mendy	4	0	0+0	0	0+0	0	2+2	0	0+0	0
	DF	(Scotland) SCO	Steven Anderson	12	0	8+0	0	2+1	0	0+0	0	1+0	0
	MF	(Scotland) SCO	Ross Matthews	29	4	18+2	3	3+0	1	4+0	0	2+0	0
	MF	(Scotland) SCO	Regan Hendry	31	4	22+0	1	4+0	3	4+0	0	1+0	0
	MF	(Scotland) SCO	Tony Dingwall	21	0	7+9	0	1+2	0	0+0	0	1+1	0
	MF	(Scotland) SCO	Dylan Tait	20	3	9+4	3	3+1	0	0+2	0	1+0	0
	MF	(Scotland) SCO	Grant Anderson	31	4	14+7	4	3+1	0	2+2	0	0+2	0
	MF	(Scotland) SCO	Brad Spencer	34	3	23+3	3	3+1	0	3+0	0	1+0	0
	MF	(Scotland) SCO	Daniel Armstrong	18	3	6+8	2	3+0	1	0+0	0	1+0	0
	FW	(Scotland) SCO	Lewis Vaughan	3	2	2+0	2	0+1	0	0+0	0	0+0	0
	FW	(Scotland) SCO	Jack Smith	7	1	0+6	1	1+0	0	0+0	0	0+0	0
	FW	(Scotland) SCO	Kieron Bowie	35	9	19+6	4	4+0	3	3+1	1	1+1	1
	FW	(Portugal) POR	João Victoria	12	1	0+7	1	0+0	0	2+2	0	0+1	0
	FW	(Scotland) SCO	Lewis Allan	22	6	10+3	1	2+2	3	4+0	2	0+1	0
	FW	(Scotland) SCO	Jamie Gullan	18	7	14+4	7	0+0	0	0+0	0	0+0	0
	FW	(Scotland) SCO	John Baird	25	5	13+6	4	4+0	0	0+0	0	2+0	1
	FW	(Scotland) SCO	Steven MacLean	7	2	5+1	2	1+0	0	0+0	0	0+0	0

- Squad numbers are not compulsory in Scottish League One.

=== Disciplinary record ===
Includes all competitive matches.

Last updated March 2020

Nation	Position	Name	League 1		Challenge Cup		League Cup		Scottish Cup		Total	
Nation	Position	Name	Booked	Sent off (straight red)	Booked	Sent off (straight red)	Booked	Sent off (straight red)	Booked	Sent off (straight red)	Booked	Sent off (straight red)
(Scotland)	DF	Kyle Benedictus	5	1	0	0	1	0	0	0	6	1
(Scotland)	DF	Iain Davidson	4	2	0	0	1	0	1	0	6	2
(Scotland)	DF	David McKay	1	1	0	0	0	0	1	0	2	1
(Scotland)	DF	Jamie Watson	1	0	0	0	0	0	0	0	1	0
(Scotland)	DF	Michael Miller	2	0	0	0	1	0	0	0	3	0
(France)	DF	Fernandy Mendy	0	0	0	0	1	0	0	0	1	0
(Scotland)	DF	Steven Anderson	1	1	0	0	0	0	0	0	1	1
(Scotland)	MF	Kieran MacDonald	5	0	1	0	0	0	0	0	6	0
(Scotland)	MF	Ross Matthews	2	1	1	0	1	0	1	0	5	1
(Scotland)	MF	Regan Hendry	4	0	2	0	1	0	0	0	7	0
(Scotland)	MF	Tony Dingwall	1	0	0	0	0	0	0	0	1	0
(Scotland)	MF	Dylan Tait	2	0	0	0	0	0	1	0	3	0
(Scotland)	MF	Grant Anderson	2	0	1	0	0	0	0	0	3	0
(Scotland)	MF	Brad Spencer	9	0	0	0	1	0	0	0	10	0
(Scotland)	MF	Daniel Armstrong	5	0	1	0	0	0	0	0	6	0
(Scotland)	FW	Kieron Bowie	1	0	0	0	0	0	0	0	1	0
(Scotland)	FW	Jamie Gullan	1	0	0	0	0	0	0	0	1	0
(Scotland)	FW	Steven MacLean	0	0	1	0	0	0	0	0	1	0

== Team statistics ==
=== League table ===
Pos	Team	Pld	W	D	L	GF	GA	GD	Pts	PPG	Promotion, qualification or relegation (Note: All play-off matches were cancelled, as clubs voted to curtail the season due to the COVID-19 pandemic.)
1	Raith Rovers (C, P)	28	15	8	5	49	33	+16	53	1.89	Promotion to the Championship
2	Falkirk	28	14	10	4	54	18	+36	52	1.86	
3	Airdrieonians	28	14	6	8	38	27	+11	48	1.71	
4	Montrose	28	15	2	11	48	38	+10	47	1.68	
5	East Fife	28	12	9	7	44	36	+8	45	1.61	

Source: SPFL
Rules for classification: 1) Points per game.
(C) Champions; (P) Promoted

=== League Cup table ===
Pos	Team	Pld	W	PW	PL	L	GF	GA	GD	Pts	Qualification	DND	ICT	PET	COV	RAI
1	Dundee	4	2	2	0	0	4	0	+4	10	Qualification for the Second Round	—	1–0	p0–0	—	—
2	Inverness CT	4	2	0	1	1	7	4	+3	7		—	—	—	3–2	4–1
3	Peterhead	4	1	1	1	1	3	4	−1	6		—	p0–0	—	2–1	—
4	Cove Rangers	4	1	0	1	2	6	5	+1	4		0–0p	—	—	—	3–0
5	Raith Rovers	4	1	0	0	3	4	11	−7	3		0–3	—	3–1	—	—

Rules for classification: 1) goal difference, 2) goals scored, 3) away goals scored, 4) matches won, 5) away matches won, 6) drawing of lots.

=== Management statistics ===
Last updated on 7 March 2020

Name	From	To	P	W	D	L	Win% (Note: Win% is the percentage of matches won rounded to two decimal places.)
John McGlynn	25 September 2018		44	27	8	9	61.36
