= 2020–21 Raith Rovers F.C. season =

Raith Rovers
2020–21 season
- Chairman: John Sim
- Manager: John McGlynn
- Stadium: Stark's Park
- Championship: 3rd
- League Cup: Group stage
- Scottish Cup: 3rd Round
- Top goalscorer: League: Daniel Armstrong (6); All: Manny Duku (10)
Home colours	Away colours

The 2020–21 season was Raith Rovers' first season back in the second tier of Scottish football after being promoted from Scottish League One at the premature end of the 2019–20 season. Raith Rovers also competed in the League Cup & the Scottish Cup.

== Summary ==
=== Management ===
Raith were led by manager John McGlynn for the 2020–21 season for his 3rd season at the club.

== Results & fixtures ==
Win Draw Loss Postponed

=== Pre-season ===
15 September 2020 Pre-Season Friendly	Dundee United	1 – 2	Raith Rovers	Tannadice Park
	40'	Raith Report	Hendry; Duku

19 September 2020 Pre-Season Friendly	Raith Rovers	2 – 6	Falkirk	Stark's Park
14:00	Coulson 11'; Hendry 53' (pen.)	Raith Report	Dowds 15', 57'; Morrison 28' (pen.); Connolly 66'; Keena 85'; Leitch 90'

22 September 2020 Pre-Season Friendly	Raith Rovers	5 – 2	Stenhousemuir	Stark's Park
19:30	Tumilty 22'; Duku 31'; Anderson 63', 87'; Armstrong 64'	Raith Report	Spence 24'; Blair 26'

26 September 2020 Pre-Season Friendly	Raith Rovers	4 – 0	Berwick Rangers	Stark's Park
14:00	Duku 9'; Tait 28', 61'; Coulson 48'	Raith Report

3 October 2020 Pre-Season Friendly	Brechin City	0 – 5	Raith Rovers	Glebe Park
15:00		Raith Report	Duku 20'; Armstrong 28'; Ross 35'; Coulson 63'; Page 71' (o.g.)

=== Scottish Championship ===
17 October 2020 Championship	Raith Rovers	3 – 0	Arbroath	Stark's Park
15:00	Armstrong 31'; Tumilty 36'; Hendry 44' (pen.)	Raith Report		Referee: Gavin Duncan

24 October 2020 Championship	Queen of the South	2 – 5	Raith Rovers	Palmerston Park
15:00	Dobbie 5' (pen.); Obileye 60'	Raith Report	Matthews 2'; Duku 12', 85'; Armstrong 27'; Tait 69'	Referee: Euan Anderson

31 October 2020 Championship	Dundee	1 – 1	Raith Rovers	Dens Park
15:00	Adam 41'	Raith Report	Musonda 86'	Referee: Alan Newlands

7 November 2020 Championship	Raith Rovers	5 – 0	Greenock Morton	Stark's Park
15:00	Armstrong 20' (pen.); Musonda 24'; Matthews 48', 54'; Mendy 82'	Raith Report		Referee: Willie Collum

21 November 2020 Championship	Inverness Caledonian Thistle	2 – 0	Raith Rovers	Caledonian Stadium
15:00	Keatings 19'; Allardice 68'	Raith Report		Attendance: 300; Referee: Alan Newlands

5 December 2020 Championship	Raith Rovers	2 – 2	Dunfermline Athletic	Stark's Park
15:00	Duku 28'; Musonda 65'	Raith Report	F.Murray 73'; McManus 74'	Referee: Euan Anderson

11 December 2020 Championship	Ayr United	0 – 0	Raith Rovers	Somerset Park
19:45		Raith Report		Referee: Alan Muir

26 December 2020 Championship	Alloa Athletic	2 – 5	Raith Rovers	Indodrill Stadium
15:00	Buchanan 75', 89' (pen.)	Raith Report	Duku 17'; Armstrong 33'; Lokotsch 84'; Ross 90', 90'	Referee: Steven McLean

29 December 2020 Championship	Raith Rovers	0 – 2	Queen of the South	Stark's Park
19:45		Raith Report	Shields 18'; Goss 90'	Referee: Barry Cook

23 January 2021 Championship	Heart of Midlothian	2 – 3	Raith Rovers	Tynecastle Park
15:00	Boyce 58', 90'	Raith Report	Ugwu 5'; Duku 47' (pen.); Tumilty 52'	Referee: John Beaton

26 January 2020 Championship	Raith Rovers	0 – 4	Heart of Midlothian	Stark's Park
19:45		Raith Report	Boyce 36'; Henderson 39'; Gnanduillet 84', 90'	Referee: Euan Anderson

30 January 2021 Championship	Raith Rovers	3 – 1	Dundee	Stark's Park
15:00	Benedictus 22'; Tumilty 54'; Kennedy 60'	Raith Report	Sow 5'	Referee: Craig Napier

3 February 2021 Championship	Dunfermline Athletic	4 – 1	Raith Rovers	East End Park
19:45	McManus 44'; Comrie 51'; F.Murray 66', 87'	Raith Report	Spencer 64'	Referee: Colin Steven

6 February 2021 Championship	Greenock Morton	0 – 1	Raith Rovers	Cappielow
15:00		Raith Report	Davidson 12'	Referee: Chris Graham

20 February 2021 Championship	Arbroath	1 – 0	Raith Rovers	Gayfield Park
15:00	Doolan 60'	Raith Report		Referee: Greg Aitken

27 February 2021 Championship	Raith Rovers	3 – 1	Alloa Athletic	Stark's Park
15:00	Davidson 68'; Hendry 84'; Gullan 90'	Raith Report	Cameron 14'	Referee: Steven Kirkland

9 March 2021 Championship	Raith Rovers	0 – 0	Ayr United	Stark's Park
19:00		Raith Report		Referee: Scott Lambie

12 March 2021 Championship	Inverness Caledonian Thistle	0 – 0	Raith Rovers	Caledonian Stadium
19:45		Raith Report		Referee: Steven McLean

16 March 2021 Championship	Raith Rovers	0 – 1	Inverness Caledonian Thistle	Stark's Park
19:00		Raith Report	D.MacKay 50'	Referee: Colin Steven

20 March 2021 Championship	Ayr United	1 – 1	Raith Rovers	Somerset Park
15:00	Muirhead 72'	Raith Report	Benedictus 57'	Referee: David Dickinson

27 March 2021 Championship	Raith Rovers	1 – 0	Greenock Morton	Stark's Park
15:00	Gullan 82'	Raith Report		Referee: John Beaton

30 March 2021 Championship	Raith Rovers	5 – 1	Dunfermline Athletic	Stark's Park
19:05	Hendry 17'; Vaughan 31', 40'; Gullan 48', 77'	Raith Report	O'Hara 22'	Referee: Euan Anderson

10 April 2021 Championship	Raith Rovers	2 – 2	Arbroath	Stark's Park
15:00	Armstrong 29', 70'	Raith Report	J.Hamilton 72'; Little 84'	Referee: Gavin Duncan

13 April 2021 Championship	Queen of the South	0 – 1	Raith Rovers	Palmerston Park
19:00		Raith Report	Ugwu 17'	Referee: David Dickinson

17 April 2021 Championship	Alloa Athletic	1 – 2	Raith Rovers	Indodrill Stadium
12:00	Cawley 23'	Raith Report	Ugwu 56' (pen.); Tait 61'	Referee: Greg Aitken

24 April 2021 Championship	Dundee	2 – 1	Raith Rovers	Dens Park
15:00	Cummings 13' (pen.); Fontaine 34'	Raith Report	Benedictus 88'	Referee: Willie Collum

30 April 2021 Championship	Raith Rovers	0 – 4	Heart of Midlothian	Stark's Park
19:45		Raith Report	MacKay-Steven 11', 73'; Henderson 57'; Naismith 70'	Referee: David Munro

=== Scottish Premiership play-offs ===
4 May 2021 Quarter-Final 1st Leg	Dunfermline Athletic	0 – 0	Raith Rovers	East End Park
19:00		Raith Report		Referee: Steven Kirkland

8 May 2021 Quarter-Final 2nd Leg	Raith Rovers	2 – 0 (2 – 0 agg.)	Dunfermline Athletic	Stark's Park
15:00	Vaughan 64'; Ugwu 89'	Raith Report		Referee: Greg Aitken

12 May 2021 Semi-Final 1st Leg	Raith Rovers	0 – 3	Dundee	Stark's Park
19:45		Raith Report	McGhee 22', 55'; Sow 84'	Referee: Nick Walsh

15 May 2021 Semi-Final 2nd Leg	Dundee	0 – 1 (3 – 1 agg.)	Raith Rovers	Dens Park
19:45		Raith Report	Vaughan 21'	Referee: Don Robertson

=== Scottish League Cup ===
==== Matches ====
10 October 2020 Group A	Raith Rovers	2 – 1	East Fife	Stark's Park
15:00	Hendry 45' (pen.); Duku 87'	Raith Report	Newton 15'	Referee: David Lowe

13 October 2020 Group A	Heart of Midlothian	3 – 1	Raith Rovers	Tynecastle Park
19:45	Wighton 2' (pen.), 40' (pen.), 87'	Raith Report	Duku 54'	Referee: Craig Napier

10 November 2020 Group A	Raith Rovers	3 – 3 (3 – 2 p)	Inverness Caledonian Thistle	Stark's Park
19:45	Duku 11', 90'; Devine 59' (o.g.)	Raith Report	Sutherland 24'; Keatings 67' (pen.); MacGregor 69'	Referee: Steven Reid
	Penalties
	Hendry (penalty scored); Matthews (penalty scored); Armstrong (penalty scored); Spencer (penalty missed)		Todorov (penalty missed); Keatings (penalty missed); Deas (penalty scored); Allardice (penalty scored); Kennedy (penalty missed)

14 November 2020 Group A	Cowdenbeath	0 – 1	Raith Rovers	Central Park
15:00		Raith Report	Duku 36'	Referee: David Lowe

=== Scottish Cup ===
23 March 2021 Round 2	Stirling Albion	0 – 2	Raith Rovers	Forthbank Stadium
19:45		Raith Report	Ugwu 45'; Tait 70'	Referee: Alan Newlands

3 April 2021 Round 3	Livingston	2 – 1 (a.e.t.)	Raith Rovers	Tony Macaroni Arena
15:00	Fitzwater 70'; Poplatnik 109'	Raith Report	Vaughan 13'	Referee: Bobby Madden

== Player statistics ==
=== Squad ===
Last updated 15 May 2021

No.	Pos	Nat	Player	Total		Championship		League Cup		Scottish Cup		Premiership play-offs	
No.	Pos	Nat	Player	Apps	Goals	Apps	Goals	Apps	Goals	Apps	Goals	Apps	Goals
1	GK	(Scotland) SCO	Jamie MacDonald	34	0	26+0	0	2+0	0	2+0	0	4+0	0
2	DF	(Scotland) SCO	Reghan Tumilty	37	3	27+0	3	4+0	0	2+0	0	4+0	0
3	DF	(Scotland) SCO	Kieran MacDonald	29	0	22+0	0	2+0	0	1+0	0	4+0	0
4	DF	(Scotland) SCO	Iain Davidson	22	2	14+2	2	2+0	0	1+0	0	3+0	0
5	DF	(Guinea-Bissau) GNB	Fernandy Mendy	12	1	4+3	1	3+0	0	0+0	0	1+1	0
6	DF	(Scotland) SCO	Kyle Benedictus	34	3	25+0	3	3+0	0	2+0	0	4+0	0
7	MF	(Scotland) SCO	Daniel Armstrong	35	6	23+3	6	3+1	0	0+2	0	3+0	0
8	MF	(Scotland) SCO	Regan Hendry	34	4	25+0	3	4+0	1	1+0	0	4+0	0
9	FW	(Netherlands) NED	Manny Duku	28	10	12+8	5	4+0	5	0+1	0	0+3	0
10	FW	(Scotland) SCO	Lewis Vaughan	17	5	7+3	2	0+1	0	1+1	1	4+0	2
11 - left on 20/10/20	MF	(Scotland) SCO	Grant Anderson	3	0	0+1	0	0+2	0	0+0	0	0+0	0
11 - joined on 27/10/20	FW	(Germany) GER	Lars Lokotsch	7	1	2+5	1	0+0	0	0+0	0	0+0	0
11 - joined on 29/01/21	FW	(England) ENG	Timmy Abraham	8	0	2+5	0	0+0	0	0+1	0	0+0	0
12	MF	(Scotland) SCO	Ross Matthews	25	3	15+2	3	4+0	0	0+0	0	4+0	0
13	MF	(Scotland) SCO	Brad Spencer	31	1	14+8	1	3+0	0	2+0	0	3+1	0
14	DF	(England) ENG	Frankie Musonda	25	3	17+4	3	2+0	0	2+0	0	0+0	0
15	DF	(Scotland) SCO	David McKay	0	0	0+0	0	0+0	0	0+0	0	0+0	0
16	FW	(Scotland) SCO	Jack Smith	1	0	0+1	0	0+0	0	0+0	0	0+0	0
17	GK	(Scotland) SCO	Robbie Thomson	5	0	1+2	0	2+0	0	0+0	0	0+0	0
18	MF	(Scotland) SCO	Dylan Tait	31	3	17+6	2	3+0	0	2+0	1	0+3	0
19	FW	(Scotland) SCO	Luke Mahady	0	0	0+0	0	0+0	0	0+0	0	0+0	0
20	GK	(Scotland) SCO	David McGurn	0	0	0+0	0	0+0	0	0+0	0	0+0	0
21	MF	(Scotland) SCO	Kai Kennedy	19	1	14+2	1	0+0	0	2+0	0	1+0	0
22 - joined on 02/10/20	MF	(Scotland) SCO	Ethan Ross	15	2	9+2	2	3+1	0	0+0	0	0+0	0
22 - joined on 31/03/21	DF	(Scotland) SCO	Nathan Cooney	2	0	0+2	0	0+0	0	0+0	0	0+0	0
23	FW	(England) ENG	Gozie Ugwu	19	5	9+4	3	0+0	0	1+1	1	1+3	1
25	MF	(Scotland) SCO	Aaron Arnott	0	0	0+0	0	0+0	0	0+0	0	0+0	0
26	MF	(Scotland) SCO	Adam King	13	0	5+5	0	0+0	0	1+1	0	0+1	0
27	MF	(Scotland) SCO	Quinn Coulson	2	0	0+1	0	0+1	0	0+0	0	0+0	0
28	GK	(Scotland) SCO	Kyle Bow	0	0	0+0	0	0+0	0	0+0	0	0+0	0
32	FW	(Scotland) SCO	Jamie Gullan	18	4	7+5	4	0+0	0	2+0	0	4+0	0

=== Disciplinary record ===
Includes all competitive matches.

Last updated May 2021

Number	Position	Nation	Name	Championship		League Cup		Scottish Cup		Premiership Play-offs		Total	
Number	Position	Nation	Name	Booked	Sent off (straight red)	Booked	Sent off (straight red)	Booked	Sent off (straight red)	Booked	Sent off (straight red)	Booked	Sent off (straight red)
1	GK	(Scotland)	Jamie MacDonald	0	0	0	0	0	0	0	0	0	0
2	DF	(Scotland)	Reghan Tumilty	5	0	0	0	0	0	2	0	7	0
3	DF	(Scotland)	Kieran MacDonald	3	0	0	0	0	0	1	0	4	0
4	DF	(Scotland)	Iain Davidson	1	2	1	0	0	0	1	0	3	2
5	DF	(Guinea-Bissau)	Fernandy Mendy	2	0	0	0	0	0	1	0	3	0
6	DF	(Scotland)	Kyle Benedictus	3	0	2	0	0	0	0	0	5	0
7	MF	(Scotland)	Daniel Armstrong	7	0	2	0	0	0	0	0	9	0
8	MF	(Scotland)	Regan Hendry	4	1	0	0	1	0	0	0	5	1
9	FW	(Netherlands)	Manny Duku	4	0	0	0	0	0	0	0	4	0
10	FW	(Scotland)	Lewis Vaughan	1	0	0	0	0	0	1	0	2	0
11 - left on 20/10/20	MF	(Scotland)	Grant Anderson	0	0	0	0	0	0	0	0	0	0
11 - joined on 27/10/20	FW	(Germany)	Lars Lokotsch	0	0	0	0	0	0	0	0	0	0
11 - joined on 29/01/21	FW	(England)	Timmy Abraham	2	0	0	0	0	0	0	0	2	0
12	MF	(Scotland)	Ross Matthews	6	0	1	0	0	0	2	0	9	0
13	MF	(Scotland)	Brad Spencer	3	0	0	0	1	0	2	0	6	0
14	DF	(England)	Frankie Musonda	2	0	0	0	0	0	0	0	2	0
15	DF	(Scotland)	David McKay	0	0	0	0	0	0	0	0	0	0
16	FW	(Scotland)	Jack Smith	0	0	0	0	0	0	0	0	0	0
17	GK	(Scotland)	Robbie Thomson	0	0	0	0	0	0	0	0	0	0
18	MF	(Scotland)	Dylan Tait	7	1	2	0	0	0	0	0	9	1
19	FW	(Scotland)	Luke Mahady	0	0	0	0	0	0	0	0	0	0
20	GK	(Scotland)	David McGurn	0	0	0	0	0	0	0	0	0	0
21	MF	(Scotland)	Kai Kennedy	2	0	0	0	0	0	0	0	2	0
22 - joined on 02/10/20	MF	(Scotland)	Ethan Ross	0	0	0	0	0	0	0	0	0	0
22 - joined on 31/03/21	DF	(Scotland)	Nathan Cooney	0	0	0	0	0	0	0	0	0	0
23	FW	(England)	Gozie Ugwu	0	0	0	0	0	0	0	0	0	0
25	MF	(Scotland)	Aaron Arnott	0	0	0	0	0	0	0	0	0	0
26	MF	(Scotland)	Adam King	1	0	0	0	0	0	0	0	1	0
27	MF	(Scotland)	Quinn Coulson	0	0	0	0	0	0	0	0	0	0
28	GK	(Scotland)	Kyle Bow	0	0	0	0	0	0	0	0	0	0
32	FW	(Scotland)	Jamie Gullan	2	0	0	0	1	0	1	0	4	0

== Team statistics ==
=== League table ===
Pos	Team	Pld	W	D	L	GF	GA	GD	Pts	Promotion, qualification or relegation
1	Heart of Midlothian (C, P)	27	17	6	4	63	24	+39	57	Promotion to the Premiership
2	Dundee (O, P)	27	12	9	6	49	40	+9	45	Qualification for the Premiership play-off semi-final
3	Raith Rovers	27	12	7	8	45	36	+9	43	Qualification for the Premiership play-off quarter-final
4	Dunfermline Athletic	27	10	9	8	38	34	+4	39	Qualification for the Premiership play-off quarter-final
5	Inverness Caledonian Thistle	27	8	12	7	36	31	+5	36	

Source: SPFL
Rules for classification: 1) Points; 2) Goal difference; 3) Goals scored; 4) Head-to-to head points; 5) Head-to-head goal difference; 6) Play-off (only for deciding promotion, play-off participation and relegation).
(C) Champions; (O) Play-off winners; (P) Promoted

=== League Cup table ===
Pos	Team	Pld	W	PW	PL	L	GF	GA	GD	Pts	Qualification	HOM	RAI	ICT	EFI	COW
1	Heart of Midlothian	4	4	0	0	0	8	3	+5	12	Qualification for the Second round	—	3–1	1–0	—	—
2	Raith Rovers	4	2	1	0	1	7	7	0	8		—	—	p3–3	2–1	—
3	Inverness Caledonian Thistle	4	1	1	1	1	4	4	0	6		—	—	—	1–0	p0–0
4	East Fife	4	1	0	0	3	5	6	−1	3		2–3	—	—	—	2–0
5	Cowdenbeath	4	0	0	1	3	0	4	−4	1		0–1	0–1	—	—	—

Rules for classification: 1) points, 2) goal difference, 3) goals scored, 4) away goals scored, 5) matches won, 6) away matches won, 7) drawing of lots.

=== Management statistics ===
Last updated on 15 May 2021

Name	From	To	P	W	D	L	Win% (Note: Win% is the percentage of matches won rounded to two decimal places.)
John McGlynn	25 September 2018		37	18	8	11	48.65
