= Regan Hendry =

Scottish footballer (born 1998)

Personal information
- Full name: Regan Hendry
- Date of birth: 21 January 1998 (age 28)
- Place of birth: Edinburgh, Scotland
- Height: 5 ft 10 in (1.78 m)
- Position: Central midfielder

Team information
- Current team: Mansfield Town
- Number: 24

Youth career
- Lothian Thistle Hutchison Vale
- –2018: Celtic

Senior career*
Years	Team	Apps	(Gls)
2018–2019	Celtic	0	(0)
2018	→ Raith Rovers (loan)	11	(0)
2018–2019	→ Raith Rovers (loan)	4	(0)
2019–2021	Raith Rovers	47	(4)
2021–2023	Forest Green Rovers	53	(4)
2023	→ Tranmere Rovers (loan)	19	(1)
2023–2025	Tranmere Rovers	71	(8)
2025–	Mansfield Town	9	(2)

International career^{‡}
2013	Scotland U15	4	(0)
2013	Scotland U16	3	(0)
2014–2015	Scotland U17	8	(2)
- * Club domestic league appearances and goals as of 1 November 2025 (UTC) ‡ National team caps and goals as of 10:08, 17 October 2020 (UTC)

Regan Hendry (born 21 January 1998) is a Scottish professional footballer who plays as a midfielder for EFL League One club Mansfield Town.

Hendry started his career at Raith Rovers, on loan from Celtic until the end of the season, in January 2018. After a second loan spell at Raith during the 2018–19 season, he was released by Celtic at the end of that season and joined Raith on a two-year contract. He won the Scottish League One title and promotion to the Scottish Championship in his first season at the club, and was named in the Championship Team of the Season by PFA Scotland and the SPFL for the following season. He signed for EFL League Two club Forest Green Rovers in summer 2021. Forest Green was promoted to EFL League One as League Two champions in his debut season at the club.

== Club career ==
=== Early career ===
Hendry was born in Edinburgh. He started his youth career at Lothian Thistle Hutchison Vale, before joining Celtic at the age of 15, where he signed a three-year contract in 2016.

=== Raith Rovers ===
On 2 January 2018, Hendry joined Raith Rovers on loan until the end of the season. He made 11 league appearances for the club over this spell. On 28 September 2018, he returned to Raith Rovers on loan until January 2019, and made a further four league appearances.

Hendry was released by Celtic at the end of the 2018–19 season, and he subsequently signed for Raith on a two-year contract. In a very successful stint with the club, Hendry would win the Scottish League One with Raith, and helped the club in a very impressive season in the Scottish Championship. Hendry would impress in these two seasons, and would be named in the Championship Team of the Season by both PFA Scotland and the SPFL in 2021. He left the club at the end of his contract in summer 2021.

=== Forest Green Rovers ===
Hendry signed a two-year contract with EFL League Two club Forest Green Rovers in June 2021. He made his debut for the club on 7 August 2021 in a 2–1 league win over newly promoted Sutton United, with Hendry providing the assist for Forest Green's late winner. Hendry made 31 league appearances for Forest Green during the 2021–22 season, scoring 3 goals and providing 2 assists as the club won EFL League Two and were promoted to EFL League One for the first time in its history.

On 31 January 2023, Hendry returned to League Two to join Tranmere Rovers on loan until the end of the season.

=== Mansfield Town ===
On 28 May 2025, Hendry agreed to join League One side Mansfield Town on a two-year deal upon the expiration of his contract with Tranmere Rovers.

== International career ==
He has played for Scotland at under-15, under-16 and under-17 levels.

== Career statistics ==
As of 1 November 2025

Appearances and goals by club, season and competition
Club	Season	League			National cup (Note: Includes FA Cup, Scottish Cup)		League cup (Note: Includes Scottish League Cup, EFL Cup)		Other		Total	
Club	Season	Division	Apps	Goals	Apps	Goals	Apps	Goals	Apps	Goals	Apps	Goals
Celtic U20	2016–17	—			—		—		3 (Note: Appearance(s) in Scottish Challenge Cup)	2	3	2
Celtic U20	2017–18	—			—		—		1	1	1	1
Celtic U20	2018–19	—			—		—		1	0	1	0
Celtic U20	Total		0	0	0	0	0	0	5	3	5	3
Celtic	2017–18	Scottish Premiership	0	0	0	0	0	0	0	0	0	0
Celtic	2018–19	Scottish Premiership	0	0	0	0	0	0	0	0	0	0
Celtic	Total		0	0	0	0	0	0	0	0	0	0
Raith Rovers (loan)	2017–18	Scottish League One	11	0	0	0	0	0	2 (Note: Appearances in Scottish Championship play-offs)	0	13	0
Raith Rovers (loan)	2018–19	Scottish League One	4	0	0	0	0	0	0	0	4	0
Raith Rovers	2019–20	Scottish League One	22	1	1	0	4	0	4	3	31	4
Raith Rovers	2020–21	Scottish Championship	25	3	1	0	4	1	4 (Note: Appearances in Scottish Premiership play-offs)	0	34	4
Raith Rovers	Total		47	4	2	0	8	1	8	3	65	8
Forest Green Rovers	2021–22	EFL League Two	31	3	0	0	2	1	2 (Note: Appearance(s) in EFL Trophy)	0	35	4
Forest Green Rovers	2022–23	EFL League One	22	1	3	0	2	0	4	0	31	1
Forest Green Rovers	Total		54	4	3	0	4	1	6	0	66	5
Tranmere Rovers (loan)	2022–23	EFL League Two	19	1	0	0	0	0	0	0	19	1
Tranmere Rovers	2023–24	EFL League Two	45	5	1	0	2	0	1	0	49	5
Tranmere Rovers	2024–25	EFL League Two	26	3	1	0	1	0	1	0	29	3
Tranmere Rovers	Total		71	8	2	0	3	0	2	0	78	8
Mansfield Town	2025–26	EFL League One	9	2	1	1	2	0	0	0	12	3
Career total			214	19	8	1	17	2	23	6	262	28

== Honours ==
Raith Rovers

- Scottish League One: 2019–20
- Scottish Challenge Cup: 2019–20

Forest Green Rovers

- EFL League Two: 2021–22

Individual

- PFA Scotland Championship Team of the Year: 2020–21
- SPFL Championship Team of the Season: 2020–21
