= Dylan Tait =

Scottish footballer

- Tait with Dundee United in 2026

Personal information
- Date of birth: 1 December 2001 (age 24)
- Place of birth: Glasgow, Scotland
- Height: 5 ft 9 in (1.76 m)
- Position: Midfielder

Team information
- Current team: Dundee United
- Number: 10

Youth career
- 2017–2019: Partick Thistle

Senior career*
Years	Team	Apps	(Gls)
2019–2021	Raith Rovers	40	(5)
2021–2024	Hibernian	0	(0)
2021–2022	→ Raith Rovers (loan)	17	(1)
2022	→ Kilmarnock (loan)	7	(0)
2022–2023	→ Arbroath (loan)	20	(0)
2023–2024	→ Hamilton Academical (loan)	17	(1)
2024	→ Falkirk (loan)	15	(2)
2024-2026	Falkirk	71	(7)
2026-	Dundee United	0	(0)
- * Club domestic league appearances and goals as of 12:10, 4 July 2026 (UTC)

Dylan Tait (born 1 October 2001) is a Scottish professional footballer who plays as a midfielder for Scottish Premiership club Dundee United.

Tait started his career with Raith Rovers, having first signed a senior contract in 2019. Hibernian signed him in August 2021 then loaned him back to Raith as part of the deal. He has since had loan spells with Kilmarnock, Arbroath, Hamilton Academical and Falkirk, with him permanently joining the latter in June 2024.

== Club career ==
=== Raith Rovers ===
Tait made his debut for Raith Rovers on the final matchday of the 2018–19 League One campaign, coming on as a late substitute in a 1–1 draw with Montrose. Tait made a further 13 appearances in the 2019–20 season, scoring 3 goals as Raith Rovers were promoted to the Scottish Championship. Tait started as Raith Rovers began their 2020–21 Championship season with a 3–0 win over Arbroath providing the assist for his side's second goal.

=== Hibernian ===
Hibernian signed Tait in August 2021 for an undisclosed fee, and loaned him back to Raith Rovers until January 2022 as part of the deal. On 20 January 2022, Tait joined Scottish Championship side Kilmarnock on loan for the remainder of the 2021–22 season.

Tait was loaned to Arbroath in September 2022, and Hamilton Academical in July 2023. His loan with Hamilton was ended in January 2024 and he then moved on loan to their League One title rivals Falkirk, where he won the title. He left Hibernian at the end of the 2023/24 season.

Falkirk

Tait joined Falkirk on the 14th June 2024 on a permanent undisclosed transfer following the expiry of the loan deal with Hibernian.

== Honours ==
Raith

- Scottish League One: 2019-20†

Falkirk

- Scottish League One: 2023-24
- Scottish Championship: 2024–25

== Career statistics ==
As of 29 April 2023

Appearances and goals by club, season and competition
Club	Season	League			Cup		League Cup		Other		Total	
Club	Season	Division	Apps	Goals	Apps	Goals	Apps	Goals	Apps	Goals	Apps	Goals
Raith Rovers	2018–19	Scottish League One	1	0	0	0	0	0	0	0	1	0
Raith Rovers	2019–20	Scottish League One	13	3	1	0	2	0	4 (Note: Appearances in the Scottish Challenge Cup)	0	20	3
Raith Rovers	2020–21	Scottish Championship	23	2	2	1	3	0	3 (Note: Appearances in the Scottish Premiership play-offs)	0	34	3
Raith Rovers	2021–22	Scottish Championship	3	0	0	0	5	0	0	0	8	0
Raith Rovers	Total		40	5	3	1	10	0	7	0	60	6
Hibernian	2021–22	Scottish Premiership	0	0	0	0	0	0	0	0	0	0
Hibernian	2022–23	Scottish Premiership	0	0	0	0	1	0	—		1	0
Hibernian	Total		0	0	0	0	1	0	0	0	1	0
Raith Rovers (loan)	2021–22	Scottish Championship	17	1	0	0	1	0	3 (Note: Appearances in the Scottish Challenge Cup)	1	21	2
Kilmarnock (loan)	2021–22	Scottish Championship	7	0	1	0	0	0	—		8	0
Arbroath (loan)	2022–23	Scottish Championship	20	0	1	0	0	0	—		21	0
Hamilton (loan)	2023–24	Scottish League One	17	1	1	0	4	0	3 (Note: Appearances in the Scottish Challenge Cup)	0	25	1
Falkirk (loan)	2023–24	Scottish League One	10	1	0	0	0	0	—		10	1
Career total			111	8	6	1	16	0	13	1	146	10
