= Daniel Armstrong (footballer, born 1997) =

Scottish professional footballer

Danny Armstrong
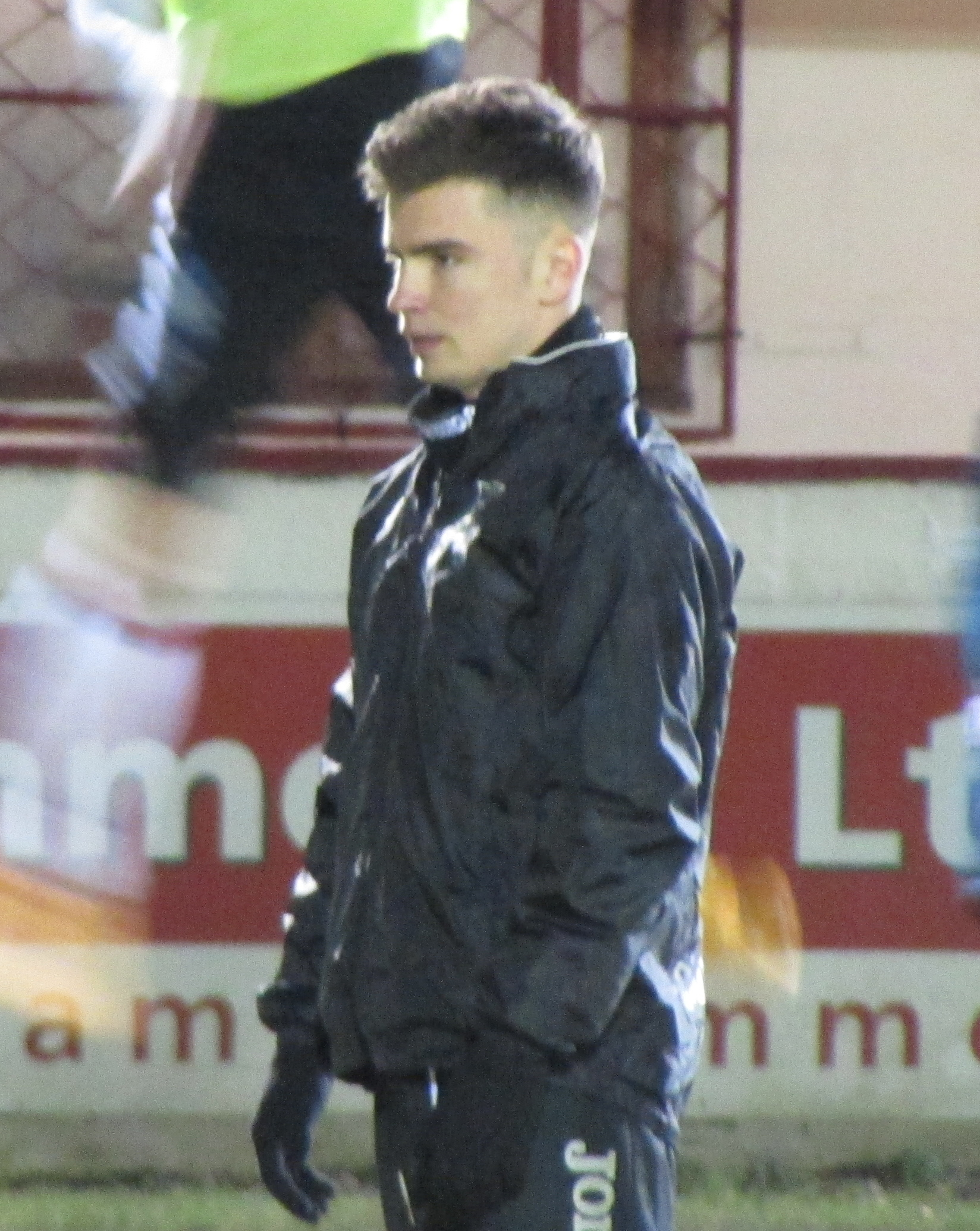

Personal information
- Full name: Daniel Charles Armstrong
- Date of birth: 11 October 1997 (age 29)
- Place of birth: Taunton, England
- Height: 5 ft 9 in (1.75 m)
- Position: Winger

Team information
- Current team: Dinamo București
- Number: 77

Youth career
- 2006–2015: Hamilton Academical
- 2015–2018: Wolverhampton Wanderers

Senior career*
Years	Team	Apps	(Gls)
2017–2018	Wolverhampton Wanderers	0	(0)
2018	→ Dunfermline Athletic (loan)	6	(0)
2018–2019	Raith Rovers	9	(5)
2019	Ross County	6	(0)
2019–2021	Raith Rovers	40	(8)
2021–2025	Kilmarnock	123	(19)
2025–	Dinamo București	53	(12)

International career
2012–2013	Scotland U16	4	(0)
- * Club domestic league appearances and goals as of 6 November 2026

Daniel Charles Armstrong (born 10 October 1997) is a Scottish professional footballer who plays as a winger for Liga I club Dinamo București.

== Career ==
Armstrong began his career playing youth football with Scottish club Hamilton Academical. After almost 10 years with the club, Armstrong was signed by EFL Championship side Wolverhampton Wanderers on 27 October 2015, agreeing a three-year deal with the side.

After primarily playing for the club's youth sides, Armstrong was loaned out to Scottish Championship side Dunfermline Athletic at end of January 2018, with the player expressing a desire to play first-team football. His first appearance for the club came as a second-half substitute for Andy Ryan in a 0–0 draw with Livingston.

He was released by Wolves at the end of the 2017–18 season. Armstrong then signed a short-term contract with Raith Rovers, and scored five goals in 11 appearances for the Kirkcaldy club. Armstrong moved to Scottish Championship club Ross County in January 2019. He scored on his debut for Ross County against East Fife in the Scottish Challenge Cup. Armstrong left County on 2 September 2019, and then returned to Raith Rovers in October 2019.

After four seasons with Kilmarnock, Armstrong signed for Romanian club Dinamo București.

== Personal life ==
Born in England, Armstrong is of Irish and Scottish descent.

== Career statistics ==
As of match played 6 November 2026

Appearances and goals by club, season and competition
Club	Season	League			National cup (Note: Includes Scottish Cup, Cupa României)		League cup (Note: Includes Scottish League Cup)		Other		Total	
Club	Season	Division	Apps	Goals	Apps	Goals	Apps	Goals	Apps	Goals	Apps	Goals
Dunfermline Athletic (loan)	2017–18	Scottish Championship	6	0	—		—		—		6	0
Raith Rovers	2018–19	Scottish League One	9	5	2	0	—		—		11	5
Ross County	2018–19	Scottish Championship	6	0	—		—		2 (Note: Appearances in Scottish Challenge Cup)	1	8	1
Raith Rovers	2019–20	Scottish League One	14	2	1	0	—		3	1	18	3
Raith Rovers	2020–21	Scottish Championship	26	6	2	0	4	0	3 (Note: Three appearances in Scottish Premiership play-offs)	0	35	6
Raith Rovers	Total		40	8	3	0	4	0	6	1	53	9
Kilmarnock	2021–22	Scottish Championship	15	1	1	0	4	0	4	1	24	2
Kilmarnock	2022–23	Scottish Premiership	37	9	3	0	7	3	—		47	12
Kilmarnock	2023–24	Scottish Premiership	38	6	3	2	6	1	—		47	9
Kilmarnock	2024–25	Scottish Premiership	33	3	1	0	—		6 (Note: Two appearances in UEFA Europa League, four appearances in UEFA Conference League)	0	40	3
Kilmarnock	Total		123	19	8	2	17	4	10	1	158	26
Dinamo Bucureşti	2025–26	Liga I	38	6	3	0	—		1 (Note: Appearances in Liga I European play-offs)	0	42	6
Dinamo Bucureşti	2026–27	Liga I	15	6	0	0	—		—		15	6
Dinamo Bucureşti	Total		53	12	3	0	—		1	0	57	12
Career total			237	43	16	2	21	4	19	3	293	52

== Honours ==
Ross County

- Scottish Championship: 2018–19
- Scottish Challenge Cup: 2018–19

Raith Rovers

- Scottish League One: 2019–20
- Scottish Challenge Cup: 2019–20

Kilmarnock

- Scottish Championship: 2021–22
