= Manny Duku =

Dutch footballer (born 1992)

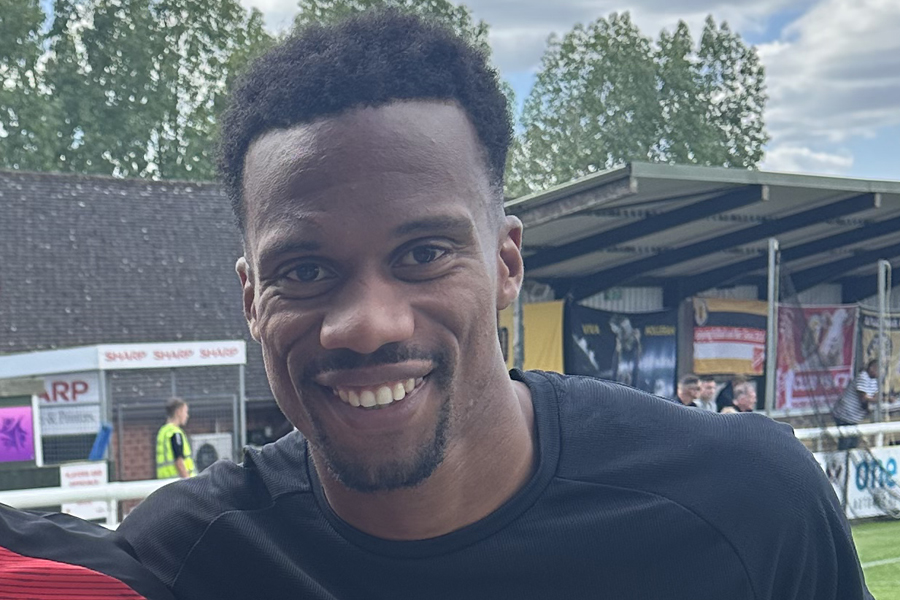
- Duku in 2025

Personal information
- Full name: Immanuelson Kwadwo Opoku Duku
- Date of birth: 28 December 1992 (age 33)
- Place of birth: Amsterdam, Netherlands
- Height: 1.88 m (6 ft 2 in)
- Position: Forward

Team information
- Current team: Bedford Town
- Number: 34

Youth career
- Legmeervogels

Senior career*
Years	Team	Apps	(Gls)
2010–2012	Legmeervogels		
2012–2014	FC Abcoude		
2014–2015	Breukelen		
2015	Eemdijk	0	(0)
2015	Chesham United	4	(0)
2015	Hemel Hempstead Town	0	(0)
2015–2017	Kings Langley	44	(7)
2017	Banbury United	12	(2)
2017–2018	Hayes & Yeading United	39	(33)
2018–2019	Cheltenham Town	11	(1)
2018	→ Barnet (loan)	6	(3)
2019	→ FC Halifax Town (loan)	12	(3)
2019	Torquay United	15	(0)
2020	Hayes & Yeading United	7	(4)
2020–2021	Raith Rovers	20	(5)
2021–2022	Inverness Caledonian Thistle	20	(0)
2022	Havant & Waterlooville	18	(7)
2022–2023	York City	30	(4)
2023	Manchester 62	6	(6)
2024	Maidstone United	5	(0)
2024	Wealdstone	9	(2)
2024–2025	Hednesford Town	24	(10)
2025	Solihull Moors	9	(4)
2025–2026	Tamworth	25	(6)
2026	Rochdale	3	(1)
2026	Eastleigh	4	(0)
2026–	Bedford Town	0	(0)
- * Club domestic league appearances and goals as of 09:39, 10 October 2026 (UTC)

Immanuelson Kwadwo Opoku Duku (born 28 December 1992) is a Dutch professional footballer who plays as a forward for National League North club Bedford Town.

== Career ==
Born in Amsterdam, Duku started his career with Legmeervogels. He was on trial with the reserve team of Eredivisie side Heerenveen at the age of 18 in 2011, before enjoying spells in the lower leagues with Legmeervogels, Abcoude, Breukelen and VV Eemdijk. He left for England to join Oxford City on a trial basis in 2015, despite not playing a minute of football for his new club, VV Eemdijk.

Following his first pre-season in England, Duku opted to join Chesham United over Oxford and went on to only appear four times for the Buckinghamshire-based side before making the switch to Hemel Hempstead Town. After just a sole appearance in an FA Trophy tie against Eastbourne Borough, Duku went on to enjoy spells with Kings Langley and Banbury United before joining Southern League Division One East side Hayes & Yeading United in June 2017. He finished as the club's top scorer, with 39 goals in all competitions across the 2017–18 season.

On 26 July 2018, Duku agreed to deal to join League Two side Cheltenham Town on a two-year deal. On the opening day of the 2018–19 campaign, he went on to make his Football League debut during Cheltenham's 1–0 home defeat to Crawley Town. Duku joined Barnet on loan in October 2018 until the end of the calendar year.

In February 2019 he joined FC Halifax Town on loan for a month. On 12 June 2019 it was announced that Duku had joined National League club Torquay United. On 9 December 2019, it was announced his contract was cancelled by mutual consent so he could return to the Netherlands with his young family. Later in an interview with Dutch website "Voetbalzone", the player contradicted this, saying this was only a statement of the club, not himself. Duku re-joined former club Hayes & Yeading United on 1 January 2020.

On 3 August 2020, Duku signed a one-year contract with Scottish Championship club Raith Rovers.

On 16 June 2021, Duku signed for fellow Scottish club Inverness Caledonian Thistle on a one-year deal. He left the club by mutual agreement in January 2022.

On 3 February 2022, Duku signed for National League South side Havant & Waterlooville. He left the club at the end of the season.

In July 2022, Duku joined newly promoted, York City in the National League. He scored his first goal for the club on his debut in a friendly against Middlesbrough. He was released after one season with the club. Upon the expiry of his contract, Duku moved to Gibraltar to join Manchester 62.

In January 2024, Duku returned to England, signing for National League South side Maidstone United. In March 2024, Duku signed for National League club Wealdstone. He scored twice in ten games before being released at the end of the season.

In July 2024, Duku joined Northern Premier League Division One West side Hednesford Town. He scored 19 goals in 38 games in all competitions before joining Solihull Moors on a short-term deal in March 2025. After scoring 4 goals in 9 appearances, Duku was released by Solihull upon the conclusion of the 2024–25 season.

On 18 July 2025, it was announced that Duku had signed for National League side Tamworth. He left the club by mutual agreement on 9 January 2026.

On 15 January 2026, he signed for Rochdale on a contract until the end of the season. On 18 May 2026, the club announced it was releasing him.

On 26 August 2026, he returned to the National League having achieved promotion with Rochdale the previous season, joining Eastleigh on a short-term deal. On 9 October 2026, he joined National League North club Bedford Town.

== Personal life ==
Born in the Netherlands, Duku is of Ghanaian descent.

== Career statistics ==
As of 9 October 2026

Appearances and goals by club, season and competition
Club	Season	League			National cup		League cup		Other		Total	
Club	Season	Division	Apps	Goals	Apps	Goals	Apps	Goals	Apps	Goals	Apps	Goals
Chesham United	2015–16	Southern League Premier Division	4	0	0	0	—		0	0	4	0
Hemel Hempstead Town	2015–16	National League South	0	0	—		—		1 (Note: Appearance(s) in FA Trophy)	0	1	0
Kings Langley	2015–16	Southern League Division One Central	15	2	—		—		0	0	15	2
Kings Langley	2016–17	Southern League Premier Division	29	5	1	0	—		4 (Note: One appearance in Southern League Cup, three in FA Trophy)	0	34	5
Kings Langley	Total		48	7	1	0	—		4	0	49	7
Banbury United	2016–17	Southern League Premier Division	12	2	—		—		0	0	12	2
Hayes & Yeading United	2017–18	Southern League Division One East	39	33	5	4	—		6 (Note: Two appearances in FA Trophy, three appearances and two goals in Southern League Cup, one appearance in Southern League Division One East play-offs)	2	50	39
Cheltenham Town	2018–19	League Two	11	1	1	0	0	0	1	0	13	1
Barnet (loan)	2018–19	National League	6	3	4	0	0	0	1	1	11	4
FC Halifax Town (loan)	2018–19	National League	12	3	0	0	0	0	0	0	12	3
Torquay United	2019–20	National League	15	0	1	0	0	0	0	0	16	0
Hayes & Yeading United	2019–20	Southern League Premier Division South	7	4	0	0	0	0	0	0	7	4
Raith Rovers	2020–21	Scottish Championship	20	5	1	0	4	5	3 (Note: Appearances in the Scottish Premiership play-offs)	0	28	10
Inverness Caledonian Thistle	2021–22	Scottish Championship	20	0	0	0	4	2	1 (Note: Appearances in the Scottish Challenge Cup)	0	25	2
Havant & Waterlooville	2021–22	National League South	18	7	0	0	—		0	0	18	7
York City	2022–23	National League	30	4	2	1	0	0	4	2	36	7
Manchester 62	2023–24	Gibraltar Football League	6	6	0	0	0	0	0	0	6	6
Maidstone United	2023–24	National League South	5	0	2	0	0	0	0	0	7	0
Wealdstone	2023–24	National League	9	2	0	0	0	0	1	0	10	2
Hednesford Town	2024–25	Northern Premier League Division One West	24	10	10	7	0	0	4 (Note: Includes FA Trophy and Walsall Senior Cup)	2	38	19
Solihull Moors	2024–25	National League	9	4	0	0	0	0	0	0	9	4
Tamworth	2025–26	National League	25	6	2	0	0	0	1 (Note: Appearances in National League Cup)	1	28	7
Rochdale	2025–26	National League	3	1	0	0	0	0	0	0	3	1
Easleigh	2026–27	National League	4	0	0	0	—		0	0	4	0
Career total			323	98	29	12	8	7	27	8	387	125
