= 2019–20 Scottish Challenge Cup =

Tournament details
- Country: Scotland
- Dates: 6 August 2019 – 28 March 2020
- Teams: 58

Final positions
- Champions: Inverness Caledonian Thistle; Raith Rovers (joint winners)

Tournament statistics
- Matches played: 56
- Goals scored: 177 (3.16 per match)
- Attendance: 46,317 (827 per match)
- Top goal scorer: Kane Hester (6 goals)
- All statistics correct as of 16 February 2020.

The 2019–20 Scottish Challenge Cup known as the Tunnock's Caramel Wafer Challenge Cup due to sponsorship reasons, was the 29th season of the competition. The total number of participating clubs is 58. The competition began on 6 August 2019 with the First Round and was due to end on 28 March 2020 with the final at McDiarmid Park in Perth. However, the final had to be postponed due to the COVID-19 pandemic and was never subsequently played.

Thirty teams from the Championship, League One and League Two compete, along with four teams from the Highland Football League and four from the Lowland Football League. In addition to this, Under-21 teams of the clubs competing in the Premiership are represented. This season there will be again two clubs from Northern Ireland's NIFL Premiership, two clubs from the Welsh Premier League, two clubs from the Republic of Ireland's League of Ireland and for the second time two entrants from the English National League (fifth tier) entered into the competition.

Ross County were the cup holders after they beat Connah's Quay 3–1 in the 2019 final, but they were ineligible to defend their title following their promotion to the Premiership for the 2019–20 season.

== Format ==
| Round | Date | Fixtures | Clubs | New entries |
|---|---|---|---|---|
| First Round | 6–7 August 2019 | 12 | 58 → 46 | 4 teams from 2018–19 Scottish League Two (7th–10th); 4 teams from 2018–19 Lowland Football League (1st–4th); 4 teams from 2018–19 Highland Football League (1st–4th); 12 U21 teams from 2019–20 Scottish Premiership |
| Second Round | 13–14 August 2019 | 14 | 46 → 32 | Teams from 2018–19 Scottish League One; 6 teams from 2018–19 Scottish League Two (1st–6th) |
| Third Round | 7–8 September 2019 | 16 | 32 → 16 | Teams from 2019–20 Scottish Championship; 2 teams from 2018–19 NIFL Premiership (2nd and 3rd); 2 teams from 2018–19 Welsh Premier League (1st and 2nd); 2 teams from 2018 League of Ireland Premier Division (4th and 6th); 2 teams from 2018–19 National League (2nd and 4th) |
| Fourth round | 12–13 October 2019 | 8 | 16 → 8 | |
| Quarter-finals | 16–17 November 2019 | 4 | 8 → 4 | |
| Semi-finals | 15–16 February 2020 | 2 | 4 → 2 | |
| Final | 28 or 29 March 2020 | 1 | 2 → 1 | |

== First round ==
The first round featured 4 clubs from the 2018-19 Scottish Highland Football League (Cove Rangers, Brora Rangers, Fraserburgh, Formartine United), 4 clubs from the 2018-19 Scottish Lowland Football League (East Kilbride, BSC Glasgow, Kelty Hearts, Spartans), 4 clubs from 2018–19 Ladbrokes League Two (Queen's Park, Elgin City, Albion Rovers, Berwick Rangers) and the 12 Under 21 teams of the 2019-20 Scottish Premiership.

The draw was made on 26 June 2019 at 12:30 in the Tunnock's factory in Uddingston and was broadcast live on the SPFL YouTube Channel. The draw was regionalised and all non-Under 21 teams were seeded. The matches were played on 6 and 7 August 2019.

=== North Section ===
==== Draw ====
Teams in bold advanced to the second round.

| Seeded Teams | Unseeded Teams |
|---|---|
| **Elgin City**; Albion Rovers; **Cove Rangers**; **Brora Rangers**; Fraserburgh; **Formartine United** | Aberdeen U21s; **Heart of Midlothian U21s**; Hibernian U21s; Livingston U21s; **Ross County U21s**; St Johnstone U21s |

==== Matches ====
| 6 August 2019 | Fraserburgh | **2–3** | **Ross County U21s** | Fraserburgh, Scotland |
| 19:30 | Beagrie 24'; Barbour 90+2' | | Murray 25'; Gallagher 54'; Keillor-Dunn 67' | Stadium: Bellslea Park; Attendance: 225; Referee: Dan McFarlane |

| 6 August 2019 | Hibernian U21s | **3–4** | **Elgin City** | Edinburgh, Scotland |
| 19:45 | Porteous 4'; Gullan 33'; Shaw 79' (pen.) | | Hester 8', 39'; Sutherland 36'; Cooper 90+2' | Stadium: Easter Road; Attendance: 424; Referee: Calum Scott |

| 6 August 2019 | **Brora Rangers** | **6–0** | Aberdeen U21s | Brora, Scotland |
| 19:45 | Nicolson 11'; Davidson 46'; Wagenaar 64'; Gillespie 71'; Macleod 75'; Williamson 90+1' | | | Stadium: Dudgeon Park; Attendance: 150; Referee: Harry Bruce |

| 6 August 2019 | Livingston U21s | **1–3** | **Formartine United** | Livingston, Scotland |
| 19:45 | Henderson 90+4' (pen.) | | McGowan 9'; Gethins 19'; Wood 84' | Stadium: Almondvale Stadium; Attendance: 120; Referee: Jordan Curran |

| 6 August 2019 | Albion Rovers | **1–4** | **Heart of Midlothian U21s** | Coatbridge, Scotland |
| 19:45 | Osadolor 34' | | Petkov 24'; Keena 29', 78'; Henderson 75' | Stadium: Cliftonhill; Attendance: 207; Referee: Alan Muir |

| 6 August 2019 | St Johnstone U21s | **1–4** | **Cove Rangers** | Perth, Scotland |
| 19:45 | Northcott 2' | | Brown 27'; Park 79'; Megginson 81'; Scott 88' | Stadium: McDiarmid Park; Attendance: 175; Referee: Matthew MacDermid |

=== South Section ===
==== Draw ====
Teams in bold advanced to the second round.

| Seeded Teams | Unseeded Teams |
|---|---|
| Queen's Park; Berwick Rangers; East Kilbride; BSC Glasgow; **Kelty Hearts**; Spartans | **Celtic U21s**; **Hamilton Academical U21s**; Kilmarnock U21s; **Motherwell U21s**; **Rangers U21s**; **St Mirren U21s** |

==== Matches ====
| 6 August 2019 | **Kelty Hearts** | **4–0** | Kilmarnock U21s | Kelty, Scotland |
| 19:45 | Carstairs 25'; Austin 36'; Mutch 49'; Linton 81' | | | Stadium: New Central Park; Attendance: 509; Referee: Stewart Luke |

| 6 August 2019 | Berwick Rangers | **1–2** | **Rangers U21s** | Berwick-upon-Tweed, England |
| 19:45 | Purves 71' | | Mebude 24' (pen.); McPake 31' | Stadium: Shielfield Park; Attendance: 303; Referee: Colin Whyte |

| 6 August 2019 | **St Mirren U21s** | **1–0** | East Kilbride | Paisley, Scotland |
| 19:45 | Breadner 32' | | | Stadium: St Mirren Park; Attendance: 245; Referee: Jordan Paterson |

| 6 August 2019 | Queen's Park | **2–2** (**3–4** p) | **Celtic U21s** | Airdrie, Scotland |
| 19:45 | Kouider-Aissa 39'; Martin 72' | | Aitchison 16'; Okoflex 29' | Stadium: Excelsior Stadium; Attendance: 321; Referee: John McKendrick |
| | **Penalties** |
| | Martin (penalty scored); Main (penalty scored); Moore (penalty missed); Clark (penalty scored); Purdue (penalty missed) | | (penalty scored) Henderson; (penalty scored) Robertson; (penalty scored) Welsh; (penalty missed) Miller; (penalty scored) Burt |

| 7 August 2019 | **Hamilton Academical U21s** | **4–0** | BSC Glasgow | Hamilton, Scotland |
| 19:45 | Breen 37'; Winter 69' (pen.), 77'; Slaven 81' | | | Stadium: New Douglas Park; Attendance: 164; Referee: Alastair Grieve |

| 7 August 2019 | **Motherwell U21s** | **1–0** | Spartans | Airdrie, Scotland |
| 19:45 | Semple 18' | | | Stadium: Excelsior Stadium; Attendance: 170; Referee: Ross Hardie |

== Second round ==
The draw was also made on 26 June 2019 at 12:30 in the Tunnock's factory in Uddingston and was broadcast live on the SPFL YouTube Channel. The draw was again regionalised but not seeded. Matches were played on 13 August 2019.

=== North Section ===
==== Matches ====
| 13 August 2019 | Heart of Midlothian U21s | 3–1 | Cowdenbeath | Linlithgow, Scotland |
| 19:45 | Baur 71'; Keena 80'; Zanatta 82' | | Barr 87' | Stadium: Prestonfield; Attendance: 326; Referee: Lloyd Wilson |

| 13 August 2019 | Ross County U21s | 2–3 | Raith Rovers | Dingwall, Scotland |
| 19:45 | Keillor-Dunn 55'; Gallagher 83' | | Allan 32', 35'; Matthews 89' | Stadium: Victoria Park; Attendance: 264; Referee: Graham Beaton |

| 13 August 2019 | Brora Rangers | 1–2 | Cove Rangers | Brora, Scotland |
| 19:45 | MacLeod 47' | | Scully 72'; Robertson 81' | Stadium: Dudgeon Park; Attendance: 300; Referee: Gordon Morrison |

| 13 August 2019 | Peterhead | 0–0 (6–7 p) | Formartine United | Peterhead, Scotland |
| 19:45 | | | | Stadium: Balmoor Stadium; Attendance: 551; Referee: Colin Steven |
| | Penalties |
| | McAllister (penalty scored); Smith (penalty scored); Fraser (penalty missed); Conroy (penalty scored); Leitch (penalty scored); S. Brown (penalty scored); J. Brown (penalty scored); Eadie (penalty missed) | | (penalty missed) Clark; (penalty scored) Smith; (penalty scored) Lisle; (penalty scored) Anderson; (penalty scored) Gethins; (penalty scored) Wood; (penalty scored) Rodger; (penalty scored) Strachan |

| 13 August 2019 | East Fife | 0–2 | Stirling Albion | Methil, Scotland |
| 19:45 | | | Duffy 37'; Peters 67' | Stadium: Bayview Stadium; Attendance: 419; Referee: Grant Irvine |

| 13 August 2019 | Brechin City | 4–5 | Elgin City | Brechin, Scotland |
| 19:45 | Reekie 20', 44', 90'; Page 36' | | Sutherland 1'; Hester 3', 35', 65'; Mackay 64' | Stadium: Glebe Park; Attendance: 217; Referee: Mike Roncone |

| 13 August 2019 | Montrose | 2–1 | Forfar Athletic | Montrose, Scotland |
| 19:45 | Milne 38'; Lyons 71' | | MacKintosh 36' | Stadium: Links Park; Attendance: 531; Referee: Gavin Duncan |

=== South Section ===
==== Matches ====
| 13 August 2019 | Clyde | 4–0 | Motherwell U21s | Cumbernauld, Scotland |
| 19:45 | Goodwillie 6'; Love 59'; McNiff 72'; Devine 84' (o.g.) | | | Stadium: Broadwood Stadium; Attendance: 372; Referee: Chris Graham |

| 13 August 2019 | Annan Athletic | 1–1 (5–6 p) | Kelty Hearts | Annan, Scotland |
| 19:45 | Currie 20' | | Ashe 69' | Stadium: Galabank; Attendance: 307; Referee: Peter Stuart |
| | Penalties |
| | Muir (penalty scored); McLean (penalty scored); Wilkie (penalty scored); McLear (penalty scored); Nadé (penalty missed); Bradley (penalty scored); Douglas (penalty missed) | | (penalty missed) Ashe; (penalty scored) Russell; (penalty scored) Linton; (penalty scored) Reilly; (penalty scored) Husband; (penalty scored) Philp; (penalty scored) McKirdy |

| 13 August 2019 | Hamilton Academical U21s | 0–1 | Airdrieonians | Hamilton, Scotland |
| 19:45 | | | Carrick 14' | Stadium: New Douglas Park; Attendance: 323; Referee: David Lowe |

| 13 August 2019 | Dumbarton | 0–1 | St Mirren U21s | Dumbarton, Scotland |
| 19:45 | | | Jack 30' | Stadium: Dumbarton Football Stadium; Attendance: 279; Referee: Craig Napier |

| 13 August 2019 | Stenhousemuir | 2–1 | Edinburgh City | Stenhousemuir, Scotland |
| 19:30 | Watters 33', 74' | | Henderson 72' | Stadium: Ochilview Park; Attendance: 178; Referee: Scott Lambie |

| 13 August 2019 | Falkirk | 1–1 (6–5 p) | Celtic U21s | Falkirk, Scotland |
| 19:45 | Longridge 10' | | Robertson 11' | Stadium: Falkirk Stadium; Attendance: 1,076; Referee: David Dickinson |
| | Penalties |
| | Telfer (penalty scored); Sammon (penalty scored); Johnstone (penalty scored); McShane (penalty scored); Longridge (penalty missed); Buchanan (penalty scored); Connolly (penalty scored) | | (penalty scored) Henderson; (penalty scored) Welsh; (penalty scored) Robertson; (penalty scored) Connell; (penalty missed) Burt; (penalty scored) Miller; (penalty missed) Aitchison |

| 13 August 2019 | Stranraer | 0–2 | Rangers U21s | Stranraer, Scotland |
| 19:45 | | | McPake 58'; Barjonas 82' | Stadium: Stair Park; Attendance: 524; Referee: Gavin Ross |

== Third round ==
The 14 winners of the Second Round are joined by the 10 clubs from the Scottish Championship and two teams from the National League, the NIFL Premiership, the Welsh Premier League and the League of Ireland Premier Division.

A pre-draw determined which country was allocated to Pot A, Pot B, Pot C and Pot D to avoid 2 cross-border teams from the same country playing each other. Pot E had the remaining 24 Scottish teams. Games will be played Saturday 7 September or Sunday 8 September 2019.

The draw was made on 14 August 2019 at 12:30 and was broadcast live on the SPFL YouTube Channel.

Teams in bold advanced to the fourth round.

| (Scotland) SPFL | | | Other Scottish | Teams from other countries |
| Championship | League One | League Two | Other Scottish | Teams from other countries |
|---|---|---|---|---|
| **Alloa Athletic**; **Arbroath**; Ayr United; Dundee; Dundee United; Dunfermline Athletic; Greenock Morton; **Inverness Caledonian Thistle**; **Partick Thistle**; Queen of the South | **Airdrieonians**; **Clyde**; Falkirk; Montrose; **Raith Rovers** | Cove Rangers; **Elgin City**; **Stenhousemuir**; Stirling Albion | Highland League: Formartine United; Lowland League: Kelty Hearts; Premiership U21s: Heart of Midlothian U21s; **Rangers U21s**; **St Mirren U21s** | (England) National League: **Solihull Moors**; **Wrexham**; (Northern Ireland) NIFL Premiership: Ballymena United; **Glenavon**; (Wales) Welsh Premier League: The New Saints; **Connah's Quay Nomads**; (Republic of Ireland) League of Ireland Premier Division: Bohemians; **Waterford** |

=== Matches ===
| 6 September 2019 | **(Republic of Ireland) Waterford** | **3–1** | Heart of Midlothian U21s | Waterford, Republic of Ireland |
| 19:45 | Chvedukas 27'; Phelan 79'; Madika 84' | | Watson 72' | Stadium: Waterford Regional Sports Centre; Attendance: 300; Referee: Paul Howard |

| 7 September 2019 | **Airdrieonians** | **3–2** | Bohemians **(Republic of Ireland)** | Airdrie, Scotland |
| 13:00 | Gallagher 19', 72'; Smith 77' | | Allardice 45+1'; Wade-Slater 74' | Stadium: Excelsior Stadium; Attendance: 730; Referee: Huw Jones |

| 7 September 2019 | **Stenhousemuir** | **1–1** (**3–1** p) | The New Saints **(Wales)** | Stenhousemuir, Scotland |
| 15:00 | Anderson 48' | | Brobbel 86' | Stadium: Ochilview Park; Attendance: 335; Referee: Damien MacGraith |
| | **Penalties** |
| | Munro (penalty scored); Gibson (penalty missed); Watters (penalty scored); Hopkirk (penalty scored) | | (penalty missed) Whitehouse; (penalty missed) Cieślewicz; (penalty scored) Marriott; (penalty missed) Ebbe |

| 7 September 2019 | **(England) Wrexham** | **1–1** (**6–5** p) | Ayr United | Wrexham, Wales |
| 15:00 | Bickerstaff 70' | | Roscoe 86' | Stadium: Racecourse Ground; Attendance: 1,697; Referee: Steven Gregg |
| | **Penalties** |
| | Rutherford (penalty scored); Bickerstaff (penalty scored); Barnum-Bobb (penalty scored); Tollitt (penalty scored); Barton (penalty scored); Lawlor (penalty scored) | | (penalty scored) Docherty; (penalty scored) Moffat; (penalty scored) Bell; (penalty scored) Geggan; (penalty scored) Forrest; (penalty missed) McCowan |

| 7 September 2019 | Kelty Hearts | **1–1** (**2–4** p) | **Solihull Moors (England)** | Kelty, Scotland |
| 15:00 | Russell 38' | | Stenson 72' | Stadium: New Central Park; Attendance: 1,146; Referee: Rob Rogers |
| | **Penalties** |
| | Ashe (penalty scored); Russell (penalty missed); Linton (penalty missed); Reilly (penalty scored) | | (penalty scored) Hawkridge; (penalty scored) Nicholls; (penalty scored) Hancox; (penalty scored) Carter |

| 7 September 2019 | Formartine United | **0–3** | **Glenavon (Northern Ireland)** | Pitmedden, Scotland |
| 15:00 | | | Daniels 13'; Marshall 70'; McCloskey 83' | Stadium: North Lodge Park; Attendance: 470; Referee: Martin Wood |

| 7 September 2019 | **Inverness Caledonian Thistle** | **3–1** | Greenock Morton | Inverness, Scotland |
| 15:00 | Todorov 25'; Doran 31'; Storey 57' | | Sutton 78' | Stadium: Caledonian Stadium; Attendance: 1,021; Referee: Willie Collum |

| 7 September 2019 | Montrose | **0–2** | **Partick Thistle** | Montrose, Scotland |
| 15:00 | | | Cardle 2'; Miller 53' | Stadium: Links Park; Attendance: 831; Referee: Craig Napier |

| 7 September 2019 | **St Mirren U21s** | **1–0** | Stirling Albion | Paisley, Scotland |
| 15:00 | MacPherson 80' | | | Stadium: St Mirren Park; Attendance: 450; Referee: Euan Anderson |

| 7 September 2019 | Dundee United | **0–0** (**3–4** p) | **Arbroath** | Dundee, Scotland |
| 15:00 | | | | Stadium: Tannadice Park; Attendance: 2,568; Referee: Mike Roncone |
| | **Penalties** |
| | Shankland (penalty scored); L. Smith (penalty missed); Stanton (penalty missed); McMullan (penalty scored); Clark (penalty scored) | | (penalty scored) McKenna; (penalty scored) Whatley; (penalty scored) Spence; (penalty missed) Stirling; (penalty scored) Linn |

| 7 September 2019 | **Clyde** | **3–2** | Queen of the South | Cumbernauld, Scotland |
| 15:00 | McStay 62'; Goodwillie 76' (pen.); McNiff 78' | | Murray 4'; Dobbie 47' (pen.) | Stadium: Broadwood Stadium; Attendance: 667; Referee: Colin Steven |

| 7 September 2019 | **Raith Rovers** | **2–0** | Falkirk | Kirkcaldy, Scotland |
| 15:00 | Hendry 17' (pen.), 50' (pen.) | | | Stadium: Stark's Park; Attendance: 1,771; Referee: Greg Aitken |

| 7 September 2019 | Dunfermline Athletic | **1–2** | **Alloa Athletic** | Dunfermline, Scotland |
| 15:00 | Kiltie 29' | | Thomson 40'; Trouten 53' | Stadium: East End Park; Attendance: 1,448; Referee: Steven McLean |

| 7 September 2019 | **(Wales) Connah's Quay Nomads** | **1–0** | Cove Rangers | Connah's Quay, Wales |
| 17:15 | Bakare 75' | | | Stadium: Deeside Stadium; Attendance: 327; Referee: Thomas Clarke |

| 8 September 2019 | Dundee | **1–2** | **Elgin City** | Dundee, Scotland |
| 15:00 | Kerr 18' | | Omar 56'; Sutherland 58' | Stadium: Dens Park; Attendance: 1,619; Referee: Grant Irvine |

| 18 September 2019 | **(Northern Ireland)** Ballymena United | **0–1** | **Rangers U21s** | Ballymena, Northern Ireland |
| 19:45 | | | Atakayi 87' | Stadium: Ballymena Showgrounds; Attendance: 895; Referee: Simon Lee Evans |

== Fourth round ==
The draw was made on 10 September 2019 at 12:30, live on the SPFL YouTube Channel.

Teams in Italics were not known at the time of the draw. Teams in Bold advanced to the quarter-finals.

| (Scotland) SPFL | Teams from other countries |
|---|---|
| Championship: Alloa Athletic; Arbroath; **Inverness Caledonian Thistle**; **Partick Thistle**; League One: Airdrieonians; **Clyde**; **Raith Rovers**; League Two: **Elgin City**; **Stenhousemuir**; Premiership U21s: **Rangers U21s**; St Mirren U21s | (England) National League: Solihull Moors; **Wrexham**; (Northern Ireland) NIFL Premiership: Glenavon; (Wales) Welsh Premier League: Connah's Quay Nomads; (Republic of Ireland) League of Ireland Premier Division: Waterford |

=== Matches ===
| 11 October 2019 | **Stenhousemuir** | **3–2** | Waterford **(Republic of Ireland)** | Stenhousemuir, Scotland |
| 19:35 | McLaughlin 30'; Hopkirk 61'; McGuigan 90+4' | | Fitzgerald 24'; O'Connor 74' | Stadium: Ochilview Park; Attendance: 440; Referee: Simon Mather |

| 12 October 2019 | Arbroath | **0–2** | **Clyde** | Arbroath, Scotland |
| 15:00 | | | Johnston 9'; Little 68' (o.g.) | Stadium: Gayfield Park; Attendance: 806; Referee: Greg Aitken |

| 12 October 2019 | Airdrieonians | **0–2** | **Elgin City** | Airdrie, Scotland |
| 15:00 | | | Hester 88'; Sutherland 90' | Stadium: Excelsior Stadium; Attendance: 615; Referee: Euan Anderson |

| 12 October 2019 | **Raith Rovers** | **3–1** | Glenavon **(Northern Ireland)** | Kirkcaldy, Scotland |
| 15:00 | Bowie 15'; Armstrong 32'; Allan 90' | | Marshall 24' | Stadium: Stark's Park; Attendance: 1,301; Referee: Bryn Markham-Jones |

| 12 October 2019 | **(England) Wrexham** | **4–1** | St Mirren U21s | Wrexham, Wales |
| 15:00 | Redmond 46'; McIntosh 55' (pen.), 73'; Tollitt 89' | | Henderson 68' | Stadium: Racecourse Ground; Attendance: 1,468; Referee: Raymond Matthews |

| 12 October 2019 | **Inverness Caledonian Thistle** | **3–0** | Alloa Athletic | Inverness, Scotland |
| 15:00 | Curry 42'; Trafford 64'; Machado 88' | | | Stadium: Caledonian Stadium; Attendance: 973; Referee: John McKendrick |

| 12 October 2019 | **Partick Thistle** | **2–0** | Connah's Quay Nomads **(Wales)** | Glasgow, Scotland |
| 17:15 | De Vita 34'; Penrice 77' | | | Stadium: Firhill Stadium; Attendance: 1,380; Referee: Jamie Robinson |

| 29 October 2019 | **(England)** Solihull Moors | **3–3** (**3–4** p) | **Rangers U21s** | Solihull, England |
| 19:45 | Howe 8'; Yussuf 36'; Carter 60' | | Barjonas 11'; Grezda 69', 84' | Stadium: Damson Park; Attendance: 1,598; Referee: John McLoughlin |
| | **Penalties** |
| | Hawkridge (penalty missed); Hancox (penalty scored); Carter (penalty scored); McCallum (penalty scored); Bigirimana (penalty missed) | | Barjonas (penalty scored); Patterson (penalty scored); Grezda (penalty scored); Kennedy (penalty scored) |

== Quarter-finals ==
The draw was made on 16 October 2019 at 13:00, live on the SPFL YouTube Channel.

Teams in Italics were not known at the time of the draw. Teams in Bold advanced to the semi-finals.

| (Scotland) SPFL | (England) National League |
|---|---|
| Championship: **Inverness Caledonian Thistle**; **Partick Thistle**; League One: Clyde; **Raith Rovers**; League Two: Elgin City; Stenhousemuir; Premiership U21s: **Rangers U21s** | Wrexham |

=== Matches ===
| 15 November 2019 | **Raith Rovers** | **3–2** | Elgin City | Kirkcaldy, Scotland |
| 19:45 | Bowie 6', 25'; McKay 56' | | Hester 35'; Sutherland 84' | Stadium: Stark's Park; Attendance: 1,108; Referee: Euan Anderson |

| 16 November 2019 | **Inverness Caledonian Thistle** | **0–0** (**4–2** p) | Clyde | Inverness, Scotland |
| 15:00 | | | | Stadium: Caledonian Stadium; Attendance: 1,066; Referee: Gavin Ross |
| | **Penalties** |
| | (penalty scored) Todorov; (penalty scored) Tremarco; (penalty scored) Donaldson; (penalty scored) Keatings | | (penalty scored) Grant; (penalty missed) Wallace; (penalty scored) McMullin; (penalty missed) McStay |

| 16 November 2019 | Stenhousemuir | **1–4** | **Partick Thistle** | Stenhousemuir, Scotland |
| 15:00 | Hopkirk 68' | | Cole 34'; Harkins 70'; Slater 79'; Miller 86' | Stadium: Ochilview Park; Attendance: 1,244; Referee: Alan Muir |

| 16 November 2019 | **Rangers U21s** | **2–0** | Wrexham **(England)** | Glasgow, Scotland |
| 15:00 | Barjonas 35'; Young-Coombes 71' | | | Stadium: Ibrox Stadium; Attendance: 5,426; Referee: Shane Andrews |

== Semi-finals ==
The draw was made on 20 November 2019 at 12:00 and was broadcast live on the SPFL YouTube Channel.

The fixtures were played from 14 to 16 February 2020.

(Scotland) SPFL

Championship

- Inverness Caledonian Thistle
- Partick Thistle

League One

- Raith Rovers

Premiership U21s

- Rangers U21s

=== Matches ===
| 14 February 2020 | Partick Thistle | 1–2 | Raith Rovers | Glasgow, Scotland |
| 19:45 | Mansell 83' | | Benedictus 31'; Hendry 74' | Stadium: Firhill Stadium; Attendance: 2,196; Referee: Alan Newlands |

| 16 February 2020 | Inverness Caledonian Thistle | 2–1 | Rangers U21s | Inverness, Scotland |
| 16:10 | Keatings 44'; Storey 73' | | Mebude 6' | Stadium: Caledonian Stadium; Attendance: 1,741; Referee: Greg Aitken |

- Note: The final was cancelled as a result of the coronavirus situation, both teams were declared joint winners.

== Broadcasting rights ==
The following matches are to be broadcast live on UK television:

| Round | BBC Alba | S4C | Premier Sports | BT Sport |
|---|---|---|---|---|
| Third Round | | Connah's Quay Nomads v Cove Rangers | | |
| Fourth Round | Stenhousemuir v Waterford | Partick Thistle v Connah's Quay Nomads | | |
| Quarter-Finals | Raith Rovers v Elgin City | | | |
| Semi-Finals | Partick Thistle v Raith Rovers; Inverness Caledonian Thistle v Rangers U21s | | | |

== Notes ==
A. The 2020–21 tournament was cancelled due to the COVID-19 pandemic in Scotland.
