= 2020–21 Scottish Championship =

Scottish Championship
- Season: 2020–21
- Dates: 16 October 2020 – 30 April 2021
- Champions: Heart of Midlothian
- Promoted: Heart of Midlothian; Dundee
- Relegated: Alloa Athletic
- Matches: 135
- Goals: 380 (2.81 per match)
- Top goalscorer: Liam Boyce (14 goals)
- Biggest home win: Heart of Midlothian 6–0 Alloa Athletic (9 April 2021)
- Biggest away win: Raith Rovers 0–4 Heart of Midlothian (26 January 2021)
- Highest scoring: Heart of Midlothian 6–2 Dundee (16 October 2020); Heart of Midlothian 5–3 Ayr United (26 December 2020)

The 2020–21 Scottish Championship was the eighth season of the Scottish Championship, the second tier of Scottish football.

Ten teams contested the league: Alloa Athletic, Arbroath, Ayr United, Dundee, Dunfermline Athletic, Greenock Morton, Heart of Midlothian, Inverness Caledonian Thistle, Queen of the South and Raith Rovers.

In June 2020, eight of the ten clubs voted in favour of shortening the season from the usual 36 games to 27 (playing each other three instead of four times), with the season starting on 16 October 2020. This was done to reduce costs in light of the coronavirus pandemic.

== Teams ==
The following teams changed division after the 2019–20 season.

=== To Championship ===
Promoted from League One

- Raith Rovers

Relegated from the Premiership

- Heart of Midlothian

=== From Championship ===
Relegated to League One

- Partick Thistle

Promoted to the Premiership

- Dundee United

=== Stadia and locations ===
Alloa Athletic	Arbroath	Ayr United	Dundee
Recreation Park	Gayfield Park	Somerset Park	Dens Park
Capacity: 3,100	Capacity: 6,600	Capacity: 10,185	Capacity: 11,775
Dunfermline Athletic	Location of teams in 2020–21 Scottish Championship		Greenock Morton
East End Park	Location of teams in 2020–21 Scottish Championship		Cappielow
Capacity: 11,480	Location of teams in 2020–21 Scottish Championship		Capacity: 11,589
Heart of Midlothian	Inverness Caledonian Thistle	Queen of the South	Raith Rovers
Tynecastle Park	Caledonian Stadium	Palmerston Park	Stark's Park
Capacity: 19,852	Capacity: 7,750	Capacity: 8,690	Capacity: 8,867

=== Personnel and kits ===
Team	Manager	Captain	Kit manufacturer	Shirt sponsor
Alloa Athletic	(Scotland) Peter Grant	(Scotland) Andy Graham	Pendle	Northern Gas and Power
Arbroath	(Scotland) Dick Campbell	(Scotland) Mark Whatley	Pendle	Megatech
Ayr United	(Scotland) David Hopkin	(Scotland) Jack Baird	Hummel	Bitcoin BCH
Dundee	(Northern Ireland) James McPake	(Scotland) Charlie Adam	Macron	Crown Engineering Services
Dunfermline Athletic	(Scotland) Stevie Crawford	(Scotland) Euan Murray	Joma	SRJ Windows
Greenock Morton	(Scotland) Gus MacPherson	(Republic of Ireland) Sean McGinty	est 1874	Millions
Heart of Midlothian	(Scotland) Robbie Neilson	(Scotland) Steven Naismith	Umbro	Save the Children
Inverness CT	(Scotland) Neil McCann (interim)	(Scotland) Sean Welsh	Puma	ILI Group
Queen of the South	(Scotland) Allan Johnston	(Scotland) Stephen Dobbie	Macron	BP's Taxis
Raith Rovers	(Scotland) John McGlynn	(Scotland) Kyle Benedictus	Joma	valmcdermid.com(Home); TAG (Away)

=== Managerial changes ===
Team	Outgoing manager	Manner of departure	Date of vacancy	Position in table	Incoming manager	Date of appointment
Heart of Midlothian	(Germany) Daniel Stendel	End of contract	21 June 2020	Pre-season	(Scotland) Robbie Neilson	21 June 2020
Greenock Morton	(Scotland) David Hopkin	Resigned	10 December 2020	7th	(Scotland) Anton McElhone (interim)	10 December 2020
Inverness CT	(Scotland) John Robertson	Compassionate leave	22 February 2021	7th	(Scotland) Neil McCann (interim)	23 February 2021
Ayr United	(Scotland) Mark Kerr	Mutual consent	28 February 2021	9th	(Scotland) David Hopkin	11 March 2021
Greenock Morton	(Scotland) Anton McElhone	End of interim	10 March 2021	6th	(Scotland) Gus MacPherson	10 March 2021

== League summary ==
=== League table ===
Pos	Team	Pld	W	D	L	GF	GA	GD	Pts	Promotion, qualification or relegation
1	Heart of Midlothian (C, P)	27	17	6	4	63	24	+39	57	Promotion to the Premiership
2	Dundee (O, P)	27	12	9	6	49	40	+9	45	Qualification for the Premiership play-off semi-final
3	Raith Rovers	27	12	7	8	45	36	+9	43	Qualification for the Premiership play-off quarter-final
4	Dunfermline Athletic	27	10	9	8	38	34	+4	39	Qualification for the Premiership play-off quarter-final
5	Inverness Caledonian Thistle	27	8	12	7	36	31	+5	36	
6	Queen of the South	27	9	5	13	38	51	−13	32	
7	Arbroath	27	7	9	11	28	34	−6	30	
8	Ayr United	27	6	11	10	31	37	−6	29	
9	Greenock Morton (O)	27	6	11	10	22	33	−11	29	Qualification for the Championship play-offs
10	Alloa Athletic (R)	27	5	7	15	30	60	−30	22	Relegation to League One

Source: SPFL
Rules for classification: 1) Points; 2) Goal difference; 3) Goals scored; 4) Head-to-to head points; 5) Head-to-head goal difference; 6) Play-off (only for deciding promotion, play-off participation and relegation).
(C) Champions; (O) Play-off winners; (P) Promoted; (R) Relegated

== Results ==
Teams play each other three times, twice in the first two thirds of the season (home and away) and once in the last third of the season, making a total of 135 games, with each team playing 27.

=== First two thirds of season (Matches 1–18) ===
Home \ Away	ALL	ARB	AYR	DUN	DNF	GMO	HOM	INV	QOS	RAI
Alloa Athletic	—	1–1	0–2	3–3	1–4	1–1	1–3	2–1	2–1	2–5
Arbroath	0–1	—	2–1	1–1	2–0	0–0	0–1	1–1	1–1	1–0
Ayr United	4–1	0–1	—	2–0	0–0	1–1	0–1	0–2	2–1	0–0
Dundee	3–1	1–0	1–3	—	3–3	1–0	3–1	2–1	2–3	1–1
Dunfermline Athletic	2–1	1–0	0–0	0–0	—	1–2	2–1	3–1	3–2	4–1
Greenock Morton	1–0	0–1	3–2	2–2	0–0	—	0–2	2–2	2–0	0–1
Heart of Midlothian	3–0	3–1	5–3	6–2	1–0	1–1	—	2–1	6–1	2–3
Inverness CT	2–2	3–1	1–1	2–2	1–1	0–1	1–1	—	0–1	2–0
Queen of the South	2–0	2–2	3–2	1–3	1–0	2–1	1–1	0–3	—	2–5
Raith Rovers	3–1	3–0	0–0	3–1	2–2	5–0	0–4	0–1	0–2	—

Source: SPFL
Legend: Blue = home team win; Yellow = draw; Red = away team win.
For upcoming matches, an "a" indicates there is an article about the rivalry between the two participants.

=== Last third of season (Matches 19–27) ===
Home \ Away	ALL	ARB	AYR	DUN	DNF	GMO	HOM	INV	QOS	RAI
Alloa Athletic	—	—	2–2	0–3	1–0	—	—	1–1	—	1–2
Arbroath	2–1	—	4–0	—	—	0–0	0–0	—	2–4	—
Ayr United	—	—	—	0–3	1–1	—	—	—	0–0	1–1
Dundee	—	2–0	—	—	3–2	1–1	—	—	—	2–1
Dunfermline Athletic	—	4–3	—	—	—	1–0	0–0	0–1	3–1	—
Greenock Morton	1–1	—	0–2	—	—	—	0–0	1–4	2–1	—
Heart of Midlothian	6–0	—	2–0	2–1	—	—	—	3–0	2–3	—
Inverness CT	—	1–0	2–2	1–1	—	—	—	—	—	0–0
Queen of the South	2–3	—	—	0–2	—	—	—	1–1	—	0–1
Raith Rovers	—	2–2	—	—	5–1	1–0	0–4	—	—	—

Source: SPFL
Legend: Blue = home team win; Yellow = draw; Red = away team win.
For upcoming matches, an "a" indicates there is an article about the rivalry between the two participants.

== Season statistics ==
=== Scoring ===
==== Top scorers ====
As of 30 April 2021

Rank	Player	Club	Goals
1	(Northern Ireland) Liam Boyce	Hearts	14
2	(Scotland) Declan McManus	Dunfermline Athletic	9
2	(Scotland) Craig Wighton	Hearts & Dunfermline Athletic	9
2	(Bulgaria) Nikolay Todorov	Inverness Caledonian Thistle	9
2	(England) Ayo Obileye	Queen of the South	9
6	(Scotland) Jack Hamilton	Arbroath	8
6	(Scotland) Jason Cummings	Dundee	8
6	(Sweden) Osman Sow	Dundee	8
6	(Scotland) Kevin O'Hara	Dunfermline Athletic	8
6	(Scotland) Connor Shields	Queen of the South	8

=== Hat-tricks ===
Player	For	Against	Score	Date
(Scotland) Kevin O'Hara	Dunfermline Athletic	Alloa Athletic	4–1 (A)	24 October 2020
(Sweden) Osman Sow	Dundee	Queen of the South	3–1 (A)	26 December 2020
(Scotland) Steven Naismith	Hearts	Arbroath	3–1 (H)	29 December 2020
(Northern Ireland) Liam Boyce	Hearts	Alloa Athletic	6–0 (H)	9 April 2021

=== Attendances ===
Games are mostly being played behind closed doors due to the COVID-19 pandemic. Limited attendance is allowed at some grounds with strict conditions under the Scottish Government Tier system, dependent on the club's geographical location.

== Awards ==
=== Monthly awards ===
Month	Manager of the Month		Player of the Month		Ref.
Month	Manager	Club	Player	Club	Ref.
October	(Scotland) Stevie Crawford	Dunfermline Athletic	(Scotland) Euan Murray	Dunfermline Athletic	
November	(Scotland) Stevie Crawford	Dunfermline Athletic	(Scotland) Kyle Turner	Dunfermline Athletic	
December	(Scotland) Robbie Neilson	Heart of Midlothian	(Scotland) Charlie Adam	Dundee	
January	(Scotland) Allan Johnston	Queen of the South	(Scotland) Connor Shields	Queen of the South	
February	(Scotland) Dick Campbell	Arbroath	(Scotland) Willie Gibson	Queen of the South	
March	(Northern Ireland) James McPake	Dundee	(England) David Carson	Inverness Caledonian Thistle	
April	(Scotland) Robbie Neilson	Heart of Midlothian	(Scotland) Jack Hamilton	Arbroath	

=== End-of-season awards ===
Manager of the Year		Player of the Year	
Manager	Club	Player	Club
(Scotland) James McPake	Dundee	(Scotland) Charlie Adam	Dundee

== Championship play-offs ==
The second bottom team (Greenock Morton) entered into a 4-team playoff with the 2nd-4th placed teams in 2020–21 Scottish League One. Cove Rangers and Airdrieonians have also secured playoff spots.

=== Semi-final ===
==== First leg ====
8 May 2021	Montrose	2–1	Greenock Morton	Montrose
15:00	McLean 57'; Webster 77'	Report	Oliver 5'	Stadium: Links Park; Referee: Grant Irvine

8 May 2021	Cove Rangers	1–1	Airdrieonians	Aberdeen
15:00	McIntosh 66'	Report	Graham 55' (o.g.)	Stadium: Balmoral Stadium; Referee: David Dickinson

==== Second leg ====
11 May 2021	Greenock Morton	3–1 (a.e.t.) (4–3 agg.)	Montrose	Greenock
19:45	Oliver 5'; Salkeld 19'; McGuffie 120'	Report	McLean 35'	Stadium: Cappielow; Referee: Euan Anderson

11 May 2021	Airdrieonians	3–2 (a.e.t.) (4–3 agg.)	Cove Rangers	Airdrie
19:45	Gallagher 19', 108'; J.McKay 90'	Report	Megginson 15'; McAllister 90'	Stadium: Excelsior Stadium; Referee: Colin Steven

=== Final ===
==== First leg ====
18 May 2021	Airdrieonians	0–1	Greenock Morton	Airdrie
19:35		Report	Muirhead 90+4'	Stadium: Excelsior Stadium; Attendance: 500; Referee: David Munro

==== Second leg ====
21 May 2021	Greenock Morton	3–0 (4–0 agg.)	Airdrieonians	Greenock
19:35	Muirhead 12', 78'; Oliver 44'	Report		Stadium: Cappielow; Attendance: 600; Referee: Alan Muir
