= Kyle Benedictus =

Scottish footballer (born 1991)

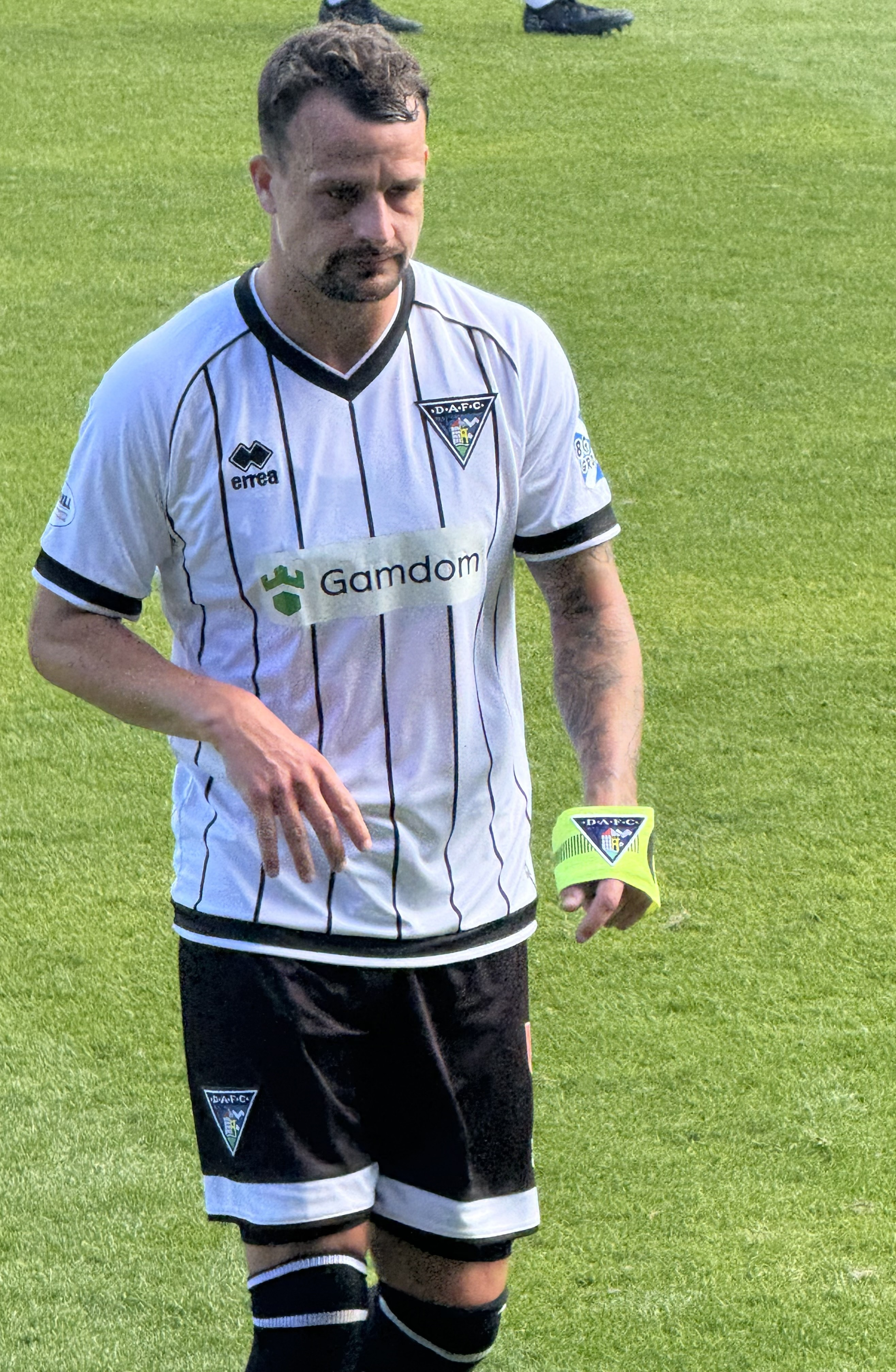
- Benedictus playing for Dunfermline Athletic in August 2025.

Personal information
- Full name: Kyle Benedictus
- Date of birth: 7 December 1991 (age 34)
- Place of birth: Dundee, Scotland
- Height: 5 ft 11 in (1.80 m)
- Position: Defender

Team information
- Current team: Dunfermline Athletic (player/coach)
- Number: 4

Youth career
- Lincraig B.C.

Senior career*
Years	Team	Apps	(Gls)
2008–2015	Dundee	84	(2)
2011	→ Montrose (loan)	5	(0)
2014–2015	→ Alloa Athletic (loan)	26	(0)
2015–2022	Raith Rovers	180	(8)
2022–	Dunfermline Athletic	96	(8)
- * Club domestic league appearances and goals as of 4 May 2026

Kyle Benedictus (born 7 December 1991) is a Scottish footballer and coach who plays as a centre back for Scottish Championship side Dunfermline Athletic, while also serving as a development coach for the club.

He started his career with Douglas Lads, then moving to Lincraig Boys Club from where he joined Dundee, and had loan spells at Montrose in 2011 and Alloa Athletic in the 2014–15 season. He would then have a lengthy stint with Raith Rovers, during which he would captain the side.

== Career ==
Dundee-born Benedictus made his début for Dundee on 1 November 2008 against Airdrie United at Dens Park, playing the full match. He later signed a contract extension after breaking into the first team.

On 28 January 2011 he joined Montrose on loan for a month.

On 1 September 2014, Benedictus signed for Scottish Championship club Alloa Athletic on a season-long loan deal. At the end of the season Alloa finished second bottom of the 2014–15 Scottish Championship meaning they faced play-offs to avoid relegation. Having not scored all season Benedictus scored twice in the play-offs and Alloa survived.

On 10 June 2015, it was confirmed that Benedictus had signed for Raith Rovers. During his lengthy 7-year stint in Kirkcaldy, Benedictus would quickly be named the club captain in his first season, experience a shock relegation to the Scottish League One in 2017, see a return to the Championship after winning the League One title in 2020, lead a strong push to the Premiership play-offs the following season, and winning two Scottish Challenge Cup titles.

On 6 June 2022, Benedictus would sign a two-year deal with Raith's Fife rivals and Scottish League One side Dunfermline Athletic. Benedictus scored his first goal for the Pars from the penalty spot in September, against league rivals Falkirk. On 15 April 2023, after an exemplary season as club captain, Benedictus led Dunfermline to the Scottish League One title which was confirmed after a 5-0 rout of Queen of the South.

On 18 June 2026, Benedictus signed a new contract extension with Dunfermline which would keep him as a registered player, but this would become a secondary role to his new title of development coach.

== Career statistics ==
As of match played 1 May 2026

Appearances and goals by club, season and competition
Club	Season	League			National Cup		League Cup		Other		Total	
Club	Season	Division	Apps	Goals	Apps	Goals	Apps	Goals	Apps	Goals	Apps	Goals
Dundee	2008–09	First Division	11	0	1	0	0	0	0	0	12	0
Dundee	2009–10	First Division	5	0	0	0	2	0	1 (Note: Appearances in the Scottish Challenge Cup)	0	8	0
Dundee	2010–11	First Division	10	0	1	0	0	0	0	0	11	0
Dundee	2011–12	First Division	14	0	0	0	0	0	1	0	15	0
Dundee	2012–13	Premier League	27	1	1	0	1	0	—		29	1
Dundee	2013–14	Championship	17	1	0	0	0	0	1	0	18	1
Dundee	2014–15	Premiership	0	0	0	0	1	0	0	0	1	0
Dundee	Dundee total		84	2	3	0	4	0	3	0	94	2
Montrose (loan)	2010–11	Third Division	5	0	0	0	0	0	0	0	5	0
Alloa Athletic (loan)	2014–15	Championship	26	0	2	0	—		6 (Note: Two appearances in the Scottish Challenge Cup; four appearances and two goals in the Championship play-offs)	2	34	2
Raith Rovers	2015–16	Championship	30	3	2	0	3	2	3 (Note: One appearance in the Scottish Challenge Cup and two in the Premiership play-offs)	0	38	5
Raith Rovers	2016–17	Championship	30	0	2	0	4	1	3 (Note: One appearance in the Scottish Challenge Cup and two in the Championship play-offs)	0	39	1
Raith Rovers	2017–18	League One	14	0	0	0	4	0	3 (Note: Two appearances in the Scottish Challenge Cup and one in the Championship play-offs)	0	21	0
Raith Rovers	2018–19	League One	25	0	3	0	4	0	5 (Note: One appearance in the Scottish Challenge Cup and one in the Championship play-offs)	0	37	0
Raith Rovers	2019–20	League One	27	0	2	0	3	0	4	1	36	1
Raith Rovers	2020–21	Championship	25	3	0	0	3	0	4 (Note: Appearances in the Premiership play-offs)	0	34	3
Raith Rovers	2021–22	Championship	29	2	2	0	6	0	4	0	41	2
Raith Rovers	Raith Rovers total		180	8	11	0	27	3	26	1	246	12
Dunfermline Athletic	2022–23	League One	35	5	2	1	4	0	2	1	43	7
Dunfermline Athletic	2023–24	Championship	14	1	0	0	4	0	0	0	18	1
Dunfermline Athletic	2024–25	Championship	30	2	3	0	3	0	2	0	38	2
Dunfermline Athletic	2025–26	Championship	17	0	1	0	4	0	1	0	23	0
Dunfermline Athletic	Dunfermline Athletic total		96	8	6	1	15	0	5	1	122	10
Career total			391	18	22	1	46	3	40	4	401	25

== Honours ==
=== Clubs ===
Dundee

- Scottish Championship: 2013–14
- Scottish Challenge Cup: 2009–10

Raith Rovers

- Scottish League One: 2019–20
- Scottish Challenge Cup (2): 2019–20, 2021–22

Dunfermline Athletic

- Scottish League One: 2022–23

=== Individual ===
- November 2008 – Young Player of the Month
- PFA Scotland Team of the Year (Scottish League One): 2022–23
