= Intelligent Land Investments =

Scottish clean energy company

Intelligent Land Investments Group plc (ILI Group)
- Type: Private
- Industry: Renewable Energy
- Founded: 2004 (Intelligent Land Investments), 2017 (ILI Group incorporated)
- Founder: Mark Wilson
- Key people: Mark Wilson (CEO)
- Products: Pumped Storage Hydro, Battery Storage, Renewable Energy Development
- Website: www.ili-energy.com

Intelligent Land Investments Group plc (ILI Group) is a Scottish clean energy development company specialising in energy storage projects, including Pumped Storage Hydro (PSH), large-scale battery storage and Green Hyperscale Data Centres. Originally founded in 2004 as Intelligent Land Investments, the company was incorporated as ILI Group in 2017, consolidating its renewable energy ventures under a single corporate entity. Under the leadership of Mark Wilson, ILI Group has developed a portfolio of over 4.7 GW of energy storage projects aimed at supporting the UK’s transition to net zero.

== History ==
During the 2008 financial crisis, ILI pivoted towards renewable energy, initially specialising in onshore wind development. The company secured planning consents for 96 wind projects out of 160 proposals, establishing itself as a key player in Scotland’s small and medium-scale wind energy sector.

=== Pumped Storage Hydro ===
The company's Pumped Storage Hydro (PSH) projects include:

- Loch na Cathrach PSH Project (450 MW) – Originally known as "Red John", this project was sold to Statkraft in 2023, making it one of Europe’s largest energy storage transactions.
- Balliemeanoch PSH Project (1.5 GW) – One of Europe’s largest proposed PSH projects, currently in the planning process.

=== Battery Storage ===
ILI Group has developed and sold multiple battery storage projects, securing grid-scale storage capacity for the UK’s renewable energy system. Key transactions include:

- 50 MW Battery Storage Project sold to EDPR in 2023.

=== Green Hyperscale Data Centres ===
In 2025, ILI Group announced plans for a network of three hyperscale data centres in Scotland, branded as “The Stoics”. The company described the proposals as a £15 billion “green digital network” spanning Scotland’s Central Belt, with sites in Fife (“Cato”), East Ayrshire (“Rufus”) and North Lanarkshire (“Aurelius”).

== Policy Advocacy ==
In 2018, the company co-sponsored a discussion paper with Strathclyde University, launched at an all-party meeting in the House of Lords, which called for policy mechanisms to encourage large-scale energy storage investment.

ILI Group is also a key member of the UK Pumped Storage Hydro Working Group, convened by Scottish Renewables, which includes SSE Renewables, Drax Power, and Foresight. This coalition successfully lobbied for a cap-and-floor mechanism for LDES, a policy that was announced by the UK Government in 2025.

== Awards and recognition ==
- Tamarindo Energy Storage Investment Awards - M&A Deal of the Year (2024) – For the sale of Loch na Cathrach to Statkraft.
- Scotsman Dealmaker Awards - Deal of the Year £50m+ (2024) – For the sale of Loch na Cathrach to Statkraft.

== Leadership ==
=== Mark Wilson, CEO ===
Mark Wilson is the founder and CEO of ILI Group. Since its transition from land investment to renewable energy development, Wilson has overseen a development pipeline of over 4.7 GW of energy storage projects, including Pumped Storage Hydro (PSH) and large-scale battery storage.

Under his leadership, ILI Group secured major transactions, including the sale of the Loch na Cathrach PSH project to Statkraft and multiple battery storage projects to major energy firms.

ILI Group is a member of the UK Pumped Storage Hydro Working Group, which includes industry stakeholders advocating for policy support for large-scale storage projects.
