= 2019 Scottish Challenge Cup final =

- Event: 2018–19 Scottish Challenge Cup
Connah's Quay Nomads	Ross County
(Wales)	(Scotland)
1	3
- Date: 23 March 2019
- Venue: Caledonian Stadium, Inverness
- Referee: Alan Muir

The 2019 Scottish Challenge Cup final, also known as the IRN-BRU Cup final for sponsorship reasons, was a football match that took place on 23 March 2019, between Ross County and Connah's Quay Nomads. It was the 28th final of the Scottish Challenge Cup since it was first organised in 1990 to celebrate the centenary of the now defunct Scottish Football League, and the sixth since the SPFL was formed. Connah's Quay became the first club from outside Scotland to reach the final since the competition was first expanded to include guest teams from other countries in 2016–17.

== Route to the final ==
The competition is a knock-out tournament and was contested by 58 teams from Scotland, England, Wales, Northern Ireland and the Republic of Ireland in 2018–19. Two teams from the English National League (fifth tier) were added to the competition in 2018–19, following the addition of teams from Wales and Northern Ireland in 2016–17 and the Republic of Ireland in 2017–18.

=== Ross County ===
Round	Opposition	Score
First round	Heart of Midlothian U21s (a)	2–1
Second round	Raith Rovers (h)	5–0
Third round	Montrose (h)	3–1
Quarter-final	Motherwell U21s (a)	2–1
Semi-final	East Fife (h)	2–1

=== Connah's Quay Nomads ===
As one of the guest teams from Wales, Connah's Quay Nomads received a bye to the second round.

Round	Opposition	Score
Second round	Falkirk (a)	1–0
Third round	(Northern Ireland) Coleraine (h)	2–0
Quarter-final	Queen's Park (a)	2–1
Semi-final	Edinburgh City (h)	1–1 (a.e.t.); 5–4 (p)

The choice of Inverness as the venue for the final caused some controversy, with the Highland city being only 15 miles (24 km) from Ross County's home in Dingwall but a distance of 400 miles (640 km) for Connah's Quay Nomads; previous finals had typically been held further south in Scotland's Central Belt.

== Match details ==
23 March 2019
16:30
Final

Connah's Quay Nomads (Wales)	1–3	Ross County
Bakare 22'	Report	Mullin 75', 78'; Lindsay 86'

Caledonian Stadium, Inverness
Attendance: 3,057
Referee: Alan Muir

Connah's Quay Nomads	Ross County

GK	1	(England) John Danby
RB	15	(England) Danny Holmes (yellow card)
CB	18	(England) Priestly Farquharson (c) (substituted off) 80'
CB	5	(England) George Horan
LB	14	(Republic of Ireland) Adam Barton
CM	8	(England) Callum Morris (yellow card) (substituted off) 81'
CM	6	(England) Danny Harrison (substituted off) 81'
LM	17	(Wales) Michael Parker
RM	22	(England) Michael Bakare
FW	9	(Wales) Michael Wilde
FW	10	(England) Andy Owens
Substitutes:
GK	20	(England) Lewis Brass
DF	2	(England) John Disney
MF	7	(England) Ryan Wignall (substituted on) 80'
MF	12	(England) Declan Poole (substituted on) 66'
MF	16	(Wales) James Owen
MF	19	(Wales) Jake Phillips (substituted on) 88'
MF	21	(Wales) Robert Hughes
Manager:
(Scotland) Andy Morrison

- Man of the match: Josh Mullin

GK	21	(Scotland) Ross Munro
RB	2	(Scotland) Marcus Fraser (c)
CB	15	(Scotland) Keith Watson
CB	12	(Republic of Ireland) Andy Boyle
LB	28	(Netherlands) Kenny van der Weg
RM	10	(Scotland) Declan McManus (substituted off) 66'
CM	8	(Scotland) Jamie Lindsay
CM	26	(Scotland) Don Cowie (substituted off) 90+2'
LM	7	(Scotland) Michael Gardyne (substituted off) 88'
FW	27	(Scotland) Ross Stewart
FW	19	(Scotland) Brian Graham
Substitutes:
GK	1	(Scotland) Scott Fox
DF	3	(Scotland) Sean Kelly
MF	14	(Scotland) Josh Mullin (substituted on) 66'
MF	16	(Scotland) Lewis Spence (substituted on) 90+2'
MF	24	(Canada) Harry Paton
MF	31	(Scotland) Daniel Armstrong (substituted on) 88'
DF	44	(England) Tom Grivosti
Manager:
(Scotland) Stuart Kettlewell and (Scotland) Steve Ferguson

Match rules

- 90 minutes.
- 30 minutes of extra-time if necessary.
- Penalty shoot-out if scores still level.
- Seven named substitutes.
- Maximum of three substitutions.
