= Lewis Allan (footballer) =

Scottish footballer (born 1996)

Personal information
- Date of birth: 25 October 1996 (age 30)
- Place of birth: Galashiels, Scotland
- Position: Striker

Youth career
- 2003–2006: Earlston Rhymers
- 2006–2014: Hibernian

Senior career*
Years	Team	Apps	(Gls)
2014–2019	Hibernian	7	(0)
2015	→ Dunfermline Athletic (loan)	8	(0)
2015	→ Forfar Athletic (loan)	7	(1)
2016	→ Livingston (loan)	3	(0)
2017	→ Edinburgh City (loan)	14	(4)
2017	→ Edinburgh City (loan)	11	(1)
2019–2020	Raith Rovers	13	(1)
2020–2024	Berwick Rangers	57	(27)
- * Club domestic league appearances and goals as of 14:20, 14 September 2020 (UTC)

Lewis Allan (born 25 October 1996) is a Scottish footballer who played as a striker for Berwick Rangers.

Allan has previously played for Hibernian, Dunfermline Athletic, Forfar Athletic, Livingston, Edinburgh City, Raith Rovers and Berwick Rangers.

== Club career ==
Allan made one appearance for Hibernian in the 2014–15 season, against Falkirk on 6 December. In February 2015, Allan was loaned to Dunfermline Athletic, making eight appearances before returning from his loan at the end of March 2015.

In August 2015, Allan was loaned to Forfar Athletic until the end of the 2015–16 season, however his loan was cut short when he had to have a bone cyst removed from his thoracic spine. In August 2016, Allan once again returned to a Scottish League One club on loan, this time with West Lothian side Livingston. After making just three appearances as a substitute and with further appearances likely being restricted, Allan returned to Hibernian at the start of October 2016. On 31 January 2017, Allan moved out on loan, this time to Scottish League Two side Edinburgh City. Allan subsequently re-joined Edinburgh City on a six-month development loan deal on 6 July 2017.

Allan was released by Hibernian in May 2019. He then signed a contract with Raith Rovers on 2 July 2019.

Berwick Rangers announced the signing of Allan on 14 September 2020.

== Career statistics ==
As of 17:22, 20 May 2019 (UTC)

Appearances and goals by club, season and competition
Club	Season	League			Scottish Cup		League Cup		Other		Total	
Club	Season	Division	Apps	Goals	Apps	Goals	Apps	Goals	Apps	Goals	Apps	Goals
Hibernian	2014–15	Scottish Championship	1	0	—		—		—		1	0
Hibernian	2015–16	Scottish Championship	—		—		—		1 (Note: Appearances in the Scottish Challenge Cup)	0	1	0
Hibernian	2016–17	Scottish Championship	—		—		—		—		—	
Hibernian	2017–18	Scottish Premiership	—		—		—		—		—	
Hibernian	2018–19	Scottish Premiership	6	0	—		—		—		6	0
Hibernian	Total		7	0	—		—		1	0	8	0
Dunfermline Athletic (loan)	2014–15	Scottish League One	8	0	—		—		—		8	0
Forfar Athletic (loan)	2015–16	Scottish League One	7	1	—		1	0	—		8	1
Livingston (loan)	2016–17	Scottish League One	3	0	—		—		1	0	4	0
Edinburgh City (loan)	2016–17	Scottish League Two	14	4	—		—		—		14	4
Edinburgh City (loan)	2017–18	Scottish League Two	11	1	1	0	3	0	1	0	16	1
Edinburgh City (loan)	Total		25	5	1	0	3	0	1	0	30	5
Hibernian Under-20s
Hibernian Under-20s	2018–19		—						1 (Note: Matches for SPFL Development League squad in the Scottish Challenge Cup against senior clubs)	0	1	0
Career Total			50	6	1	0	4	0	4	0	59	6
