= Fernandy Mendy =

Bissau-Guinean footballer

Personal information
- Date of birth: 16 January 1994 (age 32)
- Place of birth: Guédiawaye, Senegal
- Position: Defender

Team information
- Current team: Saint Nazaire

Youth career
- 2004–2011: Saint Nazaire

Senior career*
Years	Team	Apps	(Gls)
2011–2014	Angers SCO II	8	(2)
2014–2019	La Flèche	71	(0)
2019–2021	Raith Rovers	7	(1)
2019–2020	→ Kelty Hearts (loan)		
2021–2022	Alloa Athletic	18	(0)
2023–	Saint Nazaire	1	(0)
- * Club domestic league appearances and goals as of 12:43, 3 September 2023 (UTC)

Fernandy Mendy (born 16 January 1994) is a professional footballer who plays as a defender for Championnat National 3 club Saint Nazaire. Born in Senegal, he represents Guinea-Bissau internationally.

Mendy started his senior career at Angers SCO II before joining La Flèche in 2014. In summer 2019, he joined Scottish side Raith Rovers following a trial spell at the club, before joining Kelty Hearts on loan in September of that year. He left Raith in summer 2021 after the end of contract and signed for Alloa Athletic, before being released by Alloa in March 2022.

== Early life ==
Mendy was born in Guédiawaye, Senegal, as the oldest of seven children. He and his family moved to Saint-Nazaire at the age of nine.

== Club career ==
After playing youth and senior football for Saint Nazaire, he was scouted by Angers SCO aged 17 and played for Angers SCO II before joining La Flèche. He signed for Raith Rovers in summer 2019 following a trial period at the club. He made his debut for the club on 13 July 2019 in a 3–0 Scottish League Cup defeat to Dundee, where he gave possession away for the first goal and conceded a penalty for the second. He joined Kelty Hearts on a short-term loan in September 2019. He played for Raith Rovers in a 3–1 Scottish League Cup defeat to Heart of Midlothian on 13 October 2020. He was released by the club in summer 2021.

In July 2021, Mendy signed for Scottish League One side Alloa Athletic. On 7 March 2022, Mendy was released from his contract with Alloa Athletic.

In summer 2023, Mendy returned to France with former club Saint Nazaire.

== International career ==
Mendy was born in Senegal and is of Bissau-Guinean descent, and moved to France at a young age. He received his first international call-up to the Guinea-Bissau national team in March 2021. He was called up to the Guinea-Bissau squad for the 2021 Africa Cup of Nations.
