= 2019–20 Scottish League One =

Scottish League One
- Season: 2019–20
- Dates: 3 August 2019 – 15 April 2020
- Champions: Raith Rovers
- Promoted: Raith Rovers
- Relegated: Stranraer
- Matches: 139
- Goals: 387 (2.78 per match)
- Top goalscorer: David Goodwillie (20 goals)
- Biggest home win: Falkirk 6–0 Dumbarton (10 August 2019); Falkirk 6–0 Forfar Athletic (25 January 2020)
- Biggest away win: Stranraer 0–3 Falkirk (21 September 2019); Forfar Athletic 1–4 Airdrieonians (26 October 2019)
- Highest scoring: East Fife 3–5 Raith Rovers (28 December 2019)
- Longest winning run: 6 matches: Montrose
- Longest unbeaten run: 12 matches: Falkirk
- Longest winless run: 15 matches: Stranraer
- Longest losing run: 6 matches: Forfar Athletic; Montrose; Stranraer
- Highest attendance: 4,060; Falkirk 6–0 Dumbarton (10 August 2019)
- Lowest attendance: 190; Stranraer 0–1 Montrose (10 March 2020)
- Total attendance: 159,617
- Average attendance: 1,148(395)
- All statistics correct as of 1 May 2020.

The 2019–20 Scottish League One (known as Ladbrokes League One for sponsorship reasons) was the 26th season in the current format of 10 teams in the third-tier of Scottish football. The fixtures were published in June 2019 and the season began on 3 August 2019.

Ten teams contested the league: Airdrieonians, Clyde, Dumbarton, East Fife, Falkirk, Forfar Athletic, Montrose, Peterhead, Raith Rovers and Stranraer.

On 13 March 2020 all SPFL leagues were indefinitely suspended due to the COVID-19 pandemic. On 8 April, with the pandemic continuing, the SPFL board proposed to curtail the 2019–20 League One season and use the points per game earned by each team to date as the final standings. The plan was approved on 15 April, meaning the league was declared over and Raith Rovers were crowned champions and Stranraer relegated to League 2.

== Teams ==
The following teams have changed division since the 2018–19 season.

=== To League One ===
Promoted from League Two

- Peterhead
- Clyde

Relegated from the Championship

- Falkirk

=== From League One ===
Relegated to League Two

- Stenhousemuir
- Brechin City

Promoted to the Championship

- Arbroath

=== Stadia and locations ===
Airdrieonians	Clyde	Dumbarton	East Fife
Excelsior Stadium	Broadwood Stadium	Dumbarton Football Stadium	Bayview Stadium
Capacity: 10,101	Capacity: 8,086	Capacity: 2,020	Capacity: 1,980
Falkirk	Location of teams in 2019–20 Scottish League One		Forfar Athletic
Falkirk Stadium	Location of teams in 2019–20 Scottish League One		Station Park
Capacity: 7,937	Location of teams in 2019–20 Scottish League One		Capacity: 6,777
Montrose	Peterhead	Raith Rovers	Stranraer
Links Park	Balmoor	Stark's Park	Stair Park
Capacity: 4,936	Capacity: 3,150	Capacity: 8,867	Capacity: 4,178

=== Personnel and kits ===
Team	Manager	Captain	Kit manufacturer	Shirt sponsor
Airdrieonians	(Scotland) Ian Murray	(Scotland) Sean Crighton	Joma	Holemasters
Clyde	(Scotland) Danny Lennon	(Scotland) David Goodwillie	Kappa	North Lanarkshire Leisure (Home); Advance Construction (Away)
Dumbarton	(Scotland) Jim Duffy	(Scotland) Stuart Carswell	Joma	Turnberry Homes
East Fife	(Scotland) Darren Young	(Scotland) Kevin Smith	Joma	East Fife Supporters Club
Falkirk	(Scotland) David McCracken and (Scotland) Lee Miller	(Scotland) Gregor Buchanan	Puma	Central Demolition
Forfar Athletic	(Scotland) Stuart Malcolm	(South Africa) Michael Travis	Pendle	Orchard Timber Products
Montrose	(Scotland) Stewart Petrie	(Scotland) Paul Watson	Hummel	Carnegie Fuels Ltd
Peterhead	(Scotland) Jim McInally	(Scotland) Scott Brown	Adidas	Prime Seafoods
Raith Rovers	(Scotland) John McGlynn	(Scotland) Kyle Benedictus	Puma	valmcdermid.com (Home); Tag Games (Away)
Stranraer	(Scotland) Stephen Farrell	(Scotland) Jamie Hamill	Joma	Stena Line

=== Managerial changes ===
Team	Outgoing manager	Manner of departure	Date of vacancy	Position in table	Incoming manager	Date of appointment
Forfar Athletic	(Scotland) Jim Weir	Resigned	3 November 2019	10th	(Scotland) Stuart Malcolm	10 November 2019
Falkirk	(Scotland) Ray McKinnon	Sacked	16 November 2019	4th	(Scotland) David McCracken and (Scotland) Lee Miller (interim)	19 November 2019
Falkirk	(Scotland) David McCracken and (Scotland) Lee Miller (interim)	End of interim	13 December 2019	4th	(Scotland) David McCracken and (Scotland) Lee Miller	13 December 2019

== League summary ==
=== League table ===
Pos	Team	Pld	W	D	L	GF	GA	GD	Pts	PPG	Promotion, qualification or relegation (Note: All play-off matches were cancelled, as clubs voted to curtail the season due to the COVID-19 pandemic.)
1	Raith Rovers (C, P)	28	15	8	5	49	33	+16	53	1.89	Promotion to the Championship
2	Falkirk	28	14	10	4	54	18	+36	52	1.86	
3	Airdrieonians	28	14	6	8	38	27	+11	48	1.71	
4	Montrose	28	15	2	11	48	38	+10	47	1.68	
5	East Fife	28	12	9	7	44	36	+8	45	1.61	
6	Dumbarton	28	11	5	12	35	44	−9	38	1.36	
7	Clyde	28	9	7	12	35	43	−8	34	1.21	
8	Peterhead	27	7	5	15	30	44	−14	26	0.96	
9	Forfar Athletic	28	6	6	16	26	47	−21	24	0.86	
10	Stranraer (R)	27	2	10	15	28	57	−29	16	0.59	Relegation to League Two

Source: SPFL
Rules for classification: 1) Points per game.
(C) Champions; (P) Promoted; (R) Relegated

== Results ==
Teams play each other four times, twice in the first half of the season (home and away) and twice in the second half of the season (home and away), making a total of 180 games, with each team playing 36.

=== First half of season ===
Home \ Away	AIR	CLY	DUM	EFI	FAL	FOR	MON	PET	RAI	STR
Airdrieonians	—	3–1	3–1	4–0	0–0	0–2	1–3	2–1	0–1	2–2
Clyde	3–1	—	1–2	1–1	1–0	0–0	0–2	1–2	2–2	6–1
Dumbarton	0–1	1–2	—	2–4	1–1	3–1	0–2	1–0	0–1	3–1
East Fife	4–1	0–0	2–2	—	0–0	1–0	0–1	1–1	4–2	1–1
Falkirk	1–2	0–1	6–0	0–0	—	3–0	2–1	4–0	1–1	3–0
Forfar Athletic	1–4	0–0	3–4	1–2	0–2	—	2–0	2–1	1–2	1–0
Montrose	0–1	4–0	1–2	1–3	2–3	3–0	—	4–3	0–1	2–1
Peterhead	1–2	1–1	2–3	1–2	0–0	1–0	0–0	—	2–0	3–0
Raith Rovers	1–0	5–2	0–2	1–1	2–2	0–0	3–0	4–0	—	3–1
Stranraer	0–2	3–0	0–0	0–2	0–3	2–4	2–2	1–2	3–2	—

Source: Scottish League One
Legend: Blue = home team win; Yellow = draw; Red = away team win.

=== Second half of season ===
Home \ Away	AIR	CLY	DUM	EFI	FAL	FOR	MON	PET	RAI	STR
Airdrieonians	—	2–0	N/A	1–0	1–1	1–0	N/A	N/A	0–1	0–0
Clyde	N/A	—	2–0	2–1	3–2	N/A	2–1	N/A	N/A	3–3
Dumbarton	0–0	1–0	—	N/A	N/A	2–0	N/A	N/A	1–0	1–1
East Fife	2–2	N/A	4–2	—	N/A	N/A	N/A	1–0	3–5	4–2
Falkirk	N/A	N/A	3–0	2–0	—	6–0	1–0	3–0	N/A	N/A
Forfar Athletic	N/A	2–1	N/A	0–1	N/A	—	2–3	N/A	1–1	1–1
Montrose	1–0	N/A	2–1	1–0	N/A	N/A	—	4–3	N/A	4–1
Peterhead	0–2	2–0	1–0	N/A	1–3	1–1	N/A	—	N/A	N/A
Raith Rovers	N/A	1–0	N/A	N/A	1–1	2–1	4–3	2–1	—	N/A
Stranraer	N/A	N/A	N/A	N/A	1–1	N/A	0–1	N/A	1–1	—

Source: Scottish League One
Legend: Blue = home team win; Yellow = draw; Red = away team win.

== Season statistics ==
=== Scoring ===
==== Top scorers ====
Rank	Player	Club	Goals
1	(Scotland) David Goodwillie	Clyde	20
2	(Scotland) Declan McManus	Falkirk	19
3	(Scotland) Dale Carrick	Airdrieonians	12
4	(Scotland) Calum Gallagher	Airdrieonians	11
5	(Scotland) Blair Lyons	Montrose	10
6	(Scotland) Scott Agnew	East Fife	9
6	(Scotland) Graham Webster	Montrose	9
6	(Scotland) Jamie Gullan	Raith Rovers	9
9	(England) Isaac Layne	Dumbarton	8
9	(Scotland) Scott Brown	Peterhead	8

==== Hat-tricks ====
Player	For	Against	Result	Date	Ref
(Scotland) Declan McManus	Falkirk	Dumbarton	6–0 (H)	10 August 2019	
(Scotland) David Goodwillie^{5}	Clyde	Stranraer	6–1 (H)	14 September 2019	
(Scotland) David Goodwillie	Clyde	Stranraer	3–3 (H)	4 January 2020	
(Scotland) Declan McManus	Falkirk	Peterhead	3–1 (A)	11 January 2020	

Note

^{5} Player scored five goals

=== Attendances ===
Pos	Team	Total	High	Low	Average	Change
1	Airdrieonians	15,567	2,530	600	1,037	+35.9%
2	Clyde (Note: Club was playing in League Two during the previous season.)	13,369	2,048	507	954	+49.5%
3	Dumbarton	9,268	982	364	662	+7.3%
4	East Fife	11,533	1,998	425	823	+18.1%
5	Falkirk (Note: Club was playing in Championship during the previous season.)	51,987	4,060	3,289	3,713	−21.7%
6	Forfar Athletic	9,029	998	370	644	−3.2%
7	Montrose	9,293	1,095	423	663	−16.0%
8	Peterhead	9,611	1,513	443	640	−5.5%
9	Raith Rovers	25,746	3,235	975	1,839	+18.3%
10	Stranraer	4,204	549	190	350	+3.2%
	League total	159,617	4,060	190	1,148	+52.5%

== Awards ==
=== Monthly awards ===
Month	Manager of the Month		Player of the Month		Ref.
Month	Manager	Club	Player	Club	Ref.
August	(Scotland) Darren Young	East Fife	(Scotland) Marc McCallum	Forfar Athletic	
September	(Scotland) John McGlynn	Raith Rovers	(Scotland) Steven Anderson	Raith Rovers	
October	(Scotland) Stewart Petrie	Montrose	(Scotland) Graham Webster	Montrose	
November	(Scotland) Ian Murray	Airdrieonians	(Scotland) Dale Carrick	Airdrieonians	
December	(Scotland) Stewart Petrie	Montrose	(Scotland) Andrew Steeves	Montrose	
January	(Scotland) David McCracken (Scotland) Lee Miller	Falkirk	(Scotland) Declan McManus	Falkirk	
February	(Scotland) Darren Young	East Fife	(Scotland) Scott Agnew	East Fife	
