= 2021–22 Scottish League Cup group stage =

2021–22 Scottish League Cup (group stage)
Tournament details
- Country: Scotland
- Dates: 9 July 2021 – 25 July 2021
- Teams: 40

Tournament statistics
- Matches played: 74
- Goals scored: 202 (2.73 per match)
- Top goal scorer: Ally Roy (6 goals)

The 2021–22 Scottish League Cup group stage was played from 9 July 2021 to 25 July 2021. A total of 40 teams competed in the group stage. The winners of each of the eight groups, as well as the three best runners-up progressed to the second round (last 16) of the 2021–22 Scottish League Cup.

== Format ==
The group stage consists of eight groups of five teams. The five clubs competing in the UEFA Champions League (Rangers and Celtic), Europa League (St Johnstone) and Europa Conference League (Hibernian and Aberdeen) qualifying rounds are given a bye through to the second round. The 40 teams taking part in the group stage consist of the other seven teams that competed in the 2020–21 Scottish Premiership, and all of the teams that competed in the 2020–21 Scottish Championship, 2020–21 Scottish League One and 2020–21 Scottish League Two, as well as the 2020–21 Highland Football League champions and the 2020–21 Lowland Football League champions and runners-up.

The winners of each of the eight groups, as well as the three best runners-up, progress to the second round (last 16), which includes the five UEFA qualifying clubs. At this stage, the competition reverts to the traditional knock-out format. The three group winners with the highest points total and the clubs entering at this stage will be seeded, with the five group winners with the lowest points unseeded along with the three best runners-up.

The traditional point system of awarding three points for a win and one point for a draw is used, however, for each group stage match that finishes in a draw, a penalty shoot-out will take place, with the winner being awarded a bonus point.

The draw for the group stage took place on 28 May 2021 and was broadcast live on FreeSports & the SPFL YouTube channel.

== Teams ==
=== North ===
==== Seeding ====
Teams in Bold qualified for the second round.

Top seeds	Second seeds	Unseeded
01. **Livingston**; 02. **Dundee United**; 03. Ross County; 04. **Heart of Midlothian**	05. **Dundee**; 06. **Raith Rovers**; 07. Inverness Caledonian Thistle; 08. **Arbroath**	09. Alloa Athletic; 10. Cove Rangers; 11. Montrose; 12. East Fife; 13. Peterhead; 14. Forfar Athletic; 15. Elgin City; 16. Stirling Albion; 17. Cowdenbeath; 18. Brechin City; 19. Brora Rangers; 20. Kelty Hearts

=== South ===
==== Seeding ====
Teams in Bold qualified for the second round.

Top seeds	Second seeds	Unseeded
21. **St Mirren**; 22. **Motherwell**; 23. **Kilmarnock**; 24. Hamilton Academical	25. **Dunfermline Athletic**; 26. Queen of the South; 27. **Ayr United**; 28. Greenock Morton	29. Partick Thistle; 30. Airdrieonians; 31. Falkirk; 32. Clyde; 33. Dumbarton; 34. Queen's Park; 35. Edinburgh City; 36. Stranraer; 37. Stenhousemuir; 38. Albion Rovers; 39. Annan Athletic; 40. East Kilbride

== North ==
=== Group A ===
Pos	Team	Pld	W	PW	PL	L	GF	GA	GD	Pts	Qualification	HOM	STI	INV	COV	PET
1	Heart of Midlothian	4	4	0	0	0	8	0	+8	12	Qualification for the second round	—	—	1–0	3–0	—
2	Stirling Albion	4	2	1	0	1	8	7	+1	8		0–2	—	—	—	3–1
3	Inverness Caledonian Thistle	4	1	0	1	2	5	6	−1	4		—	2–2p	—	—	2–0
4	Cove Rangers	4	1	0	0	3	6	10	−4	3		—	2–3	3–1	—	—
5	Peterhead	4	1	0	0	3	4	8	−4	3		0–2	—	—	3–1	—

Rules for classification: 1) goal difference, 2) goals scored, 3) away goals scored, 4) matches won, 5) away matches won, 6) drawing of lots.

==== Matches ====
10 July 2021
15:00

Cove Rangers	2–3	Stirling Albion
Fyvie 69', 82'		Omar 28'; Flanagan 55', 90+4'

Balmoral Stadium, Aberdeen
Attendance: 500
Referee: Barry Cook
10 July 2021
15:00

Peterhead	0–2	Heart of Midlothian
		Mackay-Steven 31'; Boyce 58'

Balmoor Stadium, Peterhead
Attendance: 246
Referee: Don Robertson
13 July 2021
19:45

Heart of Midlothian	3–0	Cove Rangers
Halliday 12'; Boyce 45'; Mackay-Steven 55'

Tynecastle Park, Edinburgh
Attendance: 2,000
Referee: Colin Steven
13 July 2021
19:45

Inverness Caledonian Thistle	2–0	Peterhead
Duku 50'; Doran 54'

Caledonian Stadium, Inverness
Attendance: 679
Referee: Peter Stuart
17 July 2021
15:00

Inverness Caledonian Thistle	2–2	Stirling Albion
McGregor 27'; Sutherland 49'		Mackin 4'; Moore 20'
Penalties
Walsh (penalty missed); Allardice (penalty scored); Carson (penalty missed); McAlear (penalty scored); Sutherland (penalty missed)	2–3	(penalty scored) Carrick; (penalty missed) Leith; (penalty scored) Flanagan; (penalty scored) Omar; (penalty missed) Banner

Caledonian Stadium, Inverness
Referee: Alan Newlands
17 July 2021
15:00

Peterhead	3–1	Cove Rangers
S. Brown 3'; Cameron 44'; McLean 54'		Megginson 12'

Balmoor Stadium, Peterhead
Attendance: 236
Referee: Matthew McDermid
20 July 2021
19:45

Cove Rangers	3–1	Inverness Caledonian Thistle
McIntosh 35'; Megginson 38'; Yule 85'		Duku 90+2' (pen.)

Balmoral Stadium, Aberdeen
Attendance: 319
Referee: Chris Graham
20 July 2021
19:45

Stirling Albion	0–2	Heart of Midlothian
		Boyce 31'; Pollock 74'

Forthbank Stadium, Stirling
Attendance: 211
Referee: Grant Irvine
24 July 2021
15:00

Stirling Albion	3–1	Peterhead
McGregor 6'; McNiff 12'; Leitch 47'		Brown 7' (pen.)

Forthbank Stadium, Stirling
Attendance: 273
Referee: Barry Cook
25 July 2021
17:15

Heart of Midlothian	1–0	Inverness Caledonian Thistle
Walker 75'

Tynecastle Park, Edinburgh
Attendance: 2,989
Referee: Nick Walsh

=== Group B ===
Pos	Team	Pld	W	PW	PL	L	GF	GA	GD	Pts	Qualification	DUN	ARB	KEL	ELG	EFI
1	Dundee United	4	4	0	0	0	9	1	+8	12	Qualification for the second round	—	1–0	—	6–1	—
2	Arbroath	4	3	0	0	1	6	3	+3	9	Qualification for the second round	—	—	3–2	—	2–0
3	Kelty Hearts	4	2	0	0	2	8	5	+3	6		0–1	—	—	—	3–0
4	Elgin City	4	1	0	0	3	5	12	−7	3		—	0–1	1–3	—	—
5	East Fife	4	0	0	0	4	2	9	−7	0		0–1	—	—	2–3	—

Rules for classification: 1) goal difference, 2) goals scored, 3) away goals scored, 4) matches won, 5) away matches won, 6) drawing of lots.

==== Matches ====
9 July 2021
19:45

Kelty Hearts	0–1	Dundee United
		Shankland 77'

New Central Park, Kelty
Attendance: 500
Referee: Steven McLean
10 July 2021
15:00

Elgin City	0–1	Arbroath
		Donnelly 80'

Borough Briggs, Elgin
Attendance: 220
Referee: David Dickinson
14 July 2021
19:45

Arbroath	2–0	East Fife
Hilson 71'; Donnelly 89'

Gayfield Park, Arbroath
Attendance: 600
Referee: Steven Reid
14 July 2021
19:45

Dundee United	6–1	Elgin City
Shankland 19', 32'; Clark 24'; Pawlett 40'; Freeman 54'; Mochrie 64'		Hester 4'

Tannadice Park, Dundee
Attendance: 500
Referee: Grant Irvine
17 July 2021
15:00

Dundee United	1–0	Arbroath
Mulgrew 21'

Tannadice Park, Dundee
Attendance: 500
Referee: John Beaton
17 July 2021
15:00

Kelty Hearts	3–0	East Fife
Austin 13', 25'; Agyeman 87'

New Central Park, Kelty
Attendance: 525
Referee: Barry Cook
20 July 2021
19:45

East Fife	0–1	Dundee United
		Pawlett 40'

Bayview Stadium, Methil
Attendance: 362
Referee: Alan Muir
20 July 2021
19:45

Elgin City	1–3	Kelty Hearts
Little 5'		Russell 52'; Austin 76', 87'

Borough Briggs, Elgin
Attendance: 220
Referee: Chris Fordyce
24 July 2021
15:00

Arbroath	3–2	Kelty Hearts
Donnelly 31'; Hamilton 52'; Low 58' (pen.)		Higginbotham 20'; Cardle 27'

Gayfield Park, Arbroath
Attendance: 600
Referee: Duncan Williams
24 July 2021
15:00

East Fife	2–3	Elgin City
Smith 2'; McManus 34' (pen.)		Mailer 15'; Hester 42'; Dingwall 48'

Bayview Stadium, Methil
Attendance: 100
Referee: Dan McFarlane

=== Group C ===
Pos	Team	Pld	W	PW	PL	L	GF	GA	GD	Pts	Qualification	DUN	FOR	ROS	MON	BRO
1	Dundee	4	4	0	0	0	14	2	+12	12	Qualification for the second round	—	5–2	—	—	4–0
2	Forfar Athletic	4	2	1	0	1	6	5	+1	8		—	—	3–0 (Note: Forfar Athletic were awarded a technical 3−0 win over Ross County, who were unable to raise a team after a COVID-19 outbreak among players and staff.)	p0–0	—
3	Ross County	4	2	0	0	2	5	7	−2	6		0–3 (Note: Dundee were awarded a technical 3−0 win over Ross County, who were unable to raise a team after a COVID-19 outbreak among players and staff.)	—	—	4–1	—
4	Montrose	4	1	0	1	2	4	6	−2	4		0–2	—	—	—	3–0
5	Brora Rangers	4	0	0	0	4	0	9	−9	0		—	0–1	0–1	—	—

Rules for classification: 1) goal difference, 2) goals scored, 3) away goals scored, 4) matches won, 5) away matches won, 6) drawing of lots.

==== Matches ====
10 July 2021
15:00

Forfar Athletic	3–0 (awarded)	Ross County

Station Park, Forfar
10 July 2021
15:00

Montrose	3–0	Brora Rangers
Rennie 20'; Lyons 22'; Milne 88' (pen.)

Links Park, Montrose
Attendance: 231
Referee: Dan McFarlane
13 July 2021
19:45

Dundee	4–0	Brora Rangers
McGowan 24'; McMullan 34', 49'; Jakubiak 51'

Dens Park, Dundee
Attendance: 327
Referee: David Dickinson
13 July 2021
19:45

Forfar Athletic	0–0	Montrose
Penalties
Munro (penalty missed); Meechan (penalty scored); Gallagher (penalty scored); Shepherd (penalty scored); Harkins (penalty scored); Thomson (penalty scored)	5–4	(penalty scored) Steeves; (penalty scored) Whatley; (penalty scored) Milne; (penalty scored) Brown; (penalty missed) Johnston; (penalty missed) Watson

Station Park, Forfar
Attendance: 120
Referee: Chris Fordyce
17 July 2021
15:00

Brora Rangers	0–1	Forfar Athletic
		Gallagher 80'

Dudgeon Park, Brora
Attendance: 150
Referee: Scott Lambie
18 July 2021
15:00

Ross County	0–3 (awarded)	Dundee

Victoria Park, Dingwall
21 July 2021
19:45

Brora Rangers	0–1	Ross County
		Iacovitti 53'

Dudgeon Park, Brora
Referee: Euan Anderson
21 July 2021
19:45

Montrose	0–2	Dundee
		Cummings 70' (pen.); McCowan 73'

Links Park, Montrose
Attendance: 1,090
Referee: Alan Newlands
24 July 2021
15:00

Dundee	5–2	Forfar Athletic
Adam 12'; Panter 31'; Elliott 42'; Cummings 75' (pen.), 88'		McCluskey 62'; Anderson 81'

Dens Park, Dundee
Attendance: 771
Referee: Grant Irvine
24 July 2021
15:00

Ross County	4–1	Montrose
Spittal 6', 56'; Iacovitti 35'; White 53'		Johnston 61'

Victoria Park, Dingwall
Referee: Craig Napier

Notes

1. A: Forfar Athletic were awarded a technical 3−0 win over Ross County, who were unable to raise a team after a COVID-19 outbreak among players and staff.
2. B: Dundee were awarded a technical 3−0 win over Ross County, who were unable to raise a team after a COVID-19 outbreak among players and staff.

=== Group D ===
Pos	Team	Pld	W	PW	PL	L	GF	GA	GD	Pts	Qualification	RAI	LIV	COW	ALO	BRE
1	Raith Rovers	4	2	1	1	0	5	0	+5	9	Qualification for the second round	—	—	—	p0–0	4–0
2	Livingston	4	2	1	0	1	7	3	+4	8	Qualification for the second round	p0–0	—	3–1	—	—
3	Cowdenbeath	4	2	0	0	2	5	6	−1	6		0–1	—	—	—	3–2
4	Alloa Athletic	4	1	0	1	2	2	3	−1	4		—	2–1	0–1	—	—
5	Brechin City	4	1	0	0	3	3	10	−7	3		—	0–3	—	1–0	—

Rules for classification: 1) goal difference, 2) goals scored, 3) away goals scored, 4) matches won, 5) away matches won, 6) drawing of lots.

==== Matches ====
10 July 2021
15:00

Brechin City	0–3	Livingston
		Parkes 1'; Obileye 61'; Longridge 90+1'

Glebe Park, Brechin
Attendance: 250
Referee: Kevin Clancy
10 July 2021
15:00

Cowdenbeath	0–1	Raith Rovers
		Vaughan 21'

Central Park, Cowdenbeath
Attendance: 778
Referee: Gavin Duncan
13 July 2021
19:45

Alloa Athletic	0–1	Cowdenbeath
		Buchanan 54'

Recreation Park, Alloa
Attendance: 224
Referee: Calum Scott
13 July 2021
19:45

Raith Rovers	4–0	Brechin City
Vaughan 43'; Spencer 62', 83'; Zanatta 66'

Stark's Park, Kirkcaldy
Attendance: 594
Referee: Scott Lambie
17 July 2021
15:00

Alloa Athletic	2–1	Livingston
Taggart 82'; Trouten 86' (pen.)		Anderson 63'

Recreation Park, Alloa
Attendance: 294
Referee: Craig Napier
17 July 2021
15:00

Cowdenbeath	3–2	Brechin City
Renton 26', 89'; Buchanan 28' (pen.)		Wood 67'; Inglis 77' (pen.)

Central Park, Cowdenbeath
Attendance: 245
Referee: Dan McFarlane
20 July 2021
19:45

Brechin City	1–0	Alloa Athletic
Scott 55'

Glebe Park, Brechin
Attendance: 245
Referee: Matthew McDermid
21 July 2021
19:45

Livingston	0–0	Raith Rovers
Penalties
Anderson (penalty scored); Sibbald (penalty missed); Montaño (penalty scored); Shinnie (penalty scored); Obileye (penalty scored); Williamson (penalty scored); Longridge (penalty scored)	6–5	(penalty scored) Benedictus; (penalty missed) Tait; (penalty scored) Spencer; (penalty scored) Varian; (penalty scored) Vaughan; (penalty scored) Berra; (penalty missed) Arnott

Almondvale Stadium, Livingston
Attendance: 766
Referee: Willie Collum
24 July 2021
15:00

Livingston	3–1	Cowdenbeath
Todd 21' (o.g.); Anderson 38'; Sibbald 53'		Buchanan 9'

Almondvale Stadium, Livingston
Attendance: 545
Referee: Steven Reid
24 July 2021
15:00

Raith Rovers	0–0	Alloa Athletic
Penalties
Benedictus (penalty scored); Keatings (penalty scored); Varian (penalty scored); Spencer (penalty scored); Vaughan (penalty scored)	5–4	(penalty missed) Sammon; (penalty scored) Taggart; (penalty scored) Scougall; (penalty scored) Graham; (penalty scored) King

Stark's Park, Kirkcaldy
Attendance: 958
Referee: Greg Aitken

== South ==
=== Group E ===
Pos	Team	Pld	W	PW	PL	L	GF	GA	GD	Pts	Qualification	AYR	HAM	ALB	EDI	FAL
1	Ayr United	4	3	0	1	0	7	0	+7	10	Qualification for the second round	—	—	—	3–0	3–0 (Note: Ayr United were awarded a technical 3−0 win over Falkirk, who were unable to raise a team after a COVID-19 outbreak among players and staff.)
2	Hamilton Academical	4	2	1	0	1	5	4	+1	8		0–1	—	p2–2	—	—
3	Albion Rovers	4	0	2	1	1	4	8	−4	5		p0–0	—	—	p1–1	—
4	Edinburgh City	4	1	0	1	2	4	5	−1	4		—	0–1	—	—	3–0 (Note: Edinburgh City were awarded a technical 3−0 win over Falkirk, who were unable to raise a team after a COVID-19 outbreak among players and staff.)
5	Falkirk	4	1	0	0	3	6	9	−3	3		—	1–2	5–1	—	—

Rules for classification: 1) goal difference, 2) goals scored, 3) away goals scored, 4) matches won, 5) away matches won, 6) drawing of lots.

==== Matches ====
9 July 2021
19:45

Edinburgh City	0–1	Hamilton Academical
		Smith 25'

Ainslie Park, Edinburgh
Attendance: 300
Referee: Craig Napier
10 July 2021
15:00

Albion Rovers	0–0	Ayr United
Penalties
Stevenson (penalty scored); D. Wilson (penalty scored); Roberts (penalty scored); Reilly (penalty scored)	4–2	(penalty missed) Miller; (penalty scored) Muirhead; (penalty scored) Murdoch; (penalty missed) Adeloye

Cliftonhill, Coatbridge
Attendance: 150
Referee: Grant Irvine
13 July 2021
19:45

Ayr United	3–0	Edinburgh City
Adeloye 37', 49'; Murdoch 84'

Somerset Park, Ayr
Attendance: 500
Referee: Lloyd Wilson
13 July 2021
19:45

Falkirk	5–1	Albion Rovers
Morrison 23', 29'; Dixon 36'; Telfer 85'; Weekes 87'		Wright 11'

Falkirk Stadium, Falkirk
Attendance: 1,000
Referee: Steven Kirkland
17 July 2021
15:00

Albion Rovers	1–1	Edinburgh City
Byrne 4'		Hilton 70'
Penalties
Byrne (penalty missed); D. Wilson (penalty scored); Roberts (penalty scored); Reilly (penalty scored); Lynas (penalty missed); McKernon (penalty scored); Docherty (penalty scored)	5–4	(penalty missed) See; (penalty scored) Hilton; (penalty scored) Tapping; (penalty scored) Crane; (penalty missed) Kidd; (penalty scored) Ferguson; (penalty missed) Reekie

Cliftonhill, Coatbridge
Attendance: 120
Referee: Lorraine Watson
17 July 2021
15:00

Falkirk	1–2	Hamilton Academical
Nesbitt 46'		Hughes 79' (pen.); Hamilton 87'

Falkirk Stadium, Falkirk
Attendance: 723
Referee: Steven McLean
20 July 2021
18:00

Hamilton Academical	0–1	Ayr United
		Salkeld 27'

New Douglas Park, Hamilton
Attendance: 801
Referee: Bobby Madden
21 July 2021
19:45

Edinburgh City	3–0 (Awarded)	Falkirk

Ainslie Park, Edinburgh
24 July 2021
15:00

Ayr United	3–0 (Awarded)	Falkirk

Somerset Park, Ayr
24 July 2021
15:00

Hamilton Academical	2–2	Albion Rovers
Hughes 55' (pen.); Smith 79'		D. Wilson 37'; Reilly 39'
Penalties
Hughes (penalty scored); Smith (penalty missed); McGowan (penalty scored); Mimnaugh (penalty scored); Moyo (penalty scored); Easton (penalty scored); Hamilton (penalty scored)	6–5	(penalty scored) D. Wilson; (penalty scored) Reilly; (penalty scored) Byrne; (penalty missed) C. Wilson; (penalty scored) Roberts; (penalty scored) Wright; (penalty missed) Leslie

New Douglas Park, Hamilton
Attendance: 488
Referee: Lloyd Wilson

Notes

1. C: Edinburgh City were awarded a technical 3−0 win over Falkirk, who were unable to raise a team after a COVID-19 outbreak among players and staff.
2. D: Ayr United were awarded a technical 3−0 win over Falkirk, who were unable to raise a team after a COVID-19 outbreak among players and staff.

=== Group F ===
Pos	Team	Pld	W	PW	PL	L	GF	GA	GD	Pts	Qualification	MOT	QPK	QOS	AIR	ANN
1	Motherwell	4	3	0	0	1	6	4	+2	9	Qualification for the second round	—	—	3–2	—	2–0
2	Queen's Park	4	2	0	1	1	3	2	+1	7		0–1	—	—	0–0p	—
3	Queen of the South	4	2	0	0	2	9	6	+3	6		–	0–1	—	4–1	—
4	Airdrieonians	4	1	1	1	1	4	5	−1	6		2–0	—	—	—	1–1p
5	Annan Athletic	4	0	1	0	3	3	8	−5	2		—	1–2	1–3	—	—

Rules for classification: 1) goal difference, 2) goals scored, 3) away goals scored, 4) matches won, 5) away matches won, 6) drawing of lots.

==== Matches ====
10 July 2021
15:00

Airdrieonians	1–1	Annan Athletic
McDonald 90+1'		Wallace 67' (pen.)
Penalties
Fordyce (penalty scored); Agnew (penalty scored); Kouider-Aïssa (penalty scored); Gallagher (penalty missed); McCabe (penalty scored)	4–5	(penalty scored) Smith; (penalty scored) Birch; (penalty scored) Anderson; (penalty scored) Moxon; (penalty scored) Wallace

Excelsior Stadium, Airdrie
Attendance: 233
Referee: Steven Kirkland
10 July 2021
15:00

Queen of the South	0–1	Queen's Park
		Biggar 54'

Palmerston Park, Dumfries
Attendance: 500
Referee: John Beaton
13 July 2021
19:45

Annan Athletic	1–3	Queen of the South
Fleming 74'		Paton 29'; Roy 49', 84'

Galabank, Annan
Attendance: 300
Referee: Mike Roncone
14 July 2021
19:45

Queen's Park	0–1	Motherwell
		Lawless 15'

Firhill Stadium, Glasgow
Attendance: 250
Referee: Kevin Clancy
17 July 2021
15:00

Motherwell	3–2	Queen of the South
Watt 49'; Lamie 72'; Woolery 75'		Paton 40'; Roy 45'

Fir Park, Motherwell
Attendance: 1,539
Referee: Euan Anderson
17 July 2021
15:00

Queen's Park	0–0	Airdrieonians
Penalties
Gillespie (penalty scored); Robson (penalty scored); Murray (penalty missed); McHugh (penalty scored); Brown (penalty missed); Biggar (penalty missed)	3–4	(penalty missed) Fordyce; (penalty scored) Kouider-Aïssa; (penalty scored) Kerr; (penalty scored) Watson; (penalty missed) Agnew; (penalty scored) Gallagher

Firhill Stadium, Glasgow
Attendance: 200
Referee: Graham Grainger
20 July 2021
19:45

Annan Athletic	1–2	Queen's Park
McHugh 22' (o.g.)		Swinglehurst 13' (o.g.); Murray 81'

Galabank, Annan
Attendance: 300
Referee: Steven Reid
21 July 2021
19:45

Airdrieonians	2–0	Motherwell
McCabe 66'; McGill 79'

Excelsior Stadium, Airdrie
Attendance: 700
Referee: Don Robertson
24 July 2021
15:00

Motherwell	2–0	Annan Athletic
Amaluzor 39'; Maguire 56'

Fir Park, Motherwell
Attendance: 2,000
Referee: Gavin Duncan
24 July 2021
15:00

Queen of the South	4–1	Airdrieonians
Roy 23', 35', 58'; Soares-Junior 55'		McGill 90+1'

Palmerston Park, Dumfries
Attendance: 300
Referee: Calum Scott

=== Group G ===
Pos	Team	Pld	W	PW	PL	L	GF	GA	GD	Pts	Qualification	KIL	STR	GMO	EKI	CLY
1	Kilmarnock	4	2	1	0	1	5	6	−1	8	Qualification for the second round	—	2–1	p1–1	—	—
2	Stranraer	4	2	0	0	2	5	3	+2	6		—	—	3–0 (Note: Stranraer were awarded a technical 3−0 win over Greenock Morton, who were unable to raise a team after a COVID-19 outbreak among players and staff.)	1–0	—
3	Greenock Morton	4	1	1	1	1	3	5	−2	6		—	—	—	p0–0	2–1
4	East Kilbride	4	1	0	2	1	5	3	+2	5		3–0 (Note: East Kilbride were awarded a technical 3−0 win over Kilmarnock, who fielded an ineligible player. The match had originally finished 2–0 to Kilmarnock.)	—	—	—	2–2p
5	Clyde	4	1	1	0	2	5	6	−1	5		1–2	1–0	—	—	—

Rules for classification: 1) goal difference, 2) goals scored, 3) away goals scored, 4) matches won, 5) away matches won, 6) drawing of lots.

==== Matches ====
10 July 2021
15:00

East Kilbride	3–0 (awarded)	Kilmarnock
		F. Murray 49'; Naismith 62'

K-Park Training Academy, East Kilbride
Attendance: 270
Referee: David Munro
10 July 2021
15:00

Stranraer	3–0 (awarded)	Greenock Morton

Stair Park, Stranraer
13 July 2021
19:30

Clyde	1–0	Stranraer
Goodwillie 24' (pen.)

Broadwood Stadium, Cumbernauld
Attendance: 419
Referee: Gavin Duncan
13 July 2021
19:30

Greenock Morton	0–0	East Kilbride
Penalties
Jacobs (penalty missed); Ugwu (penalty scored); Muirhead (penalty scored); Garrity (penalty scored); Oliver (penalty scored); Lithgow (penalty scored)	5–4	(penalty missed) Malcolm; (penalty scored) Elliott; (penalty scored) Stevenson; (penalty scored) Erskine; (penalty scored) Stewart; (penalty missed) Malcolm

Cappielow, Greenock
Referee: Graham Grainger
17 July 2021
15:00

Clyde	1–2	Kilmarnock
Love 57' (pen.)		Alston 1'; Cameron 19' (pen.)

Broadwood Stadium, Cumbernauld
Attendance: 500
Referee: Greg Aitken
17 July 2021
15:00

Stranraer	1–0	East Kilbride
Yates 26'

Stair Park, Stranraer
Attendance: 220
Referee: Stewart Luke
20 July 2021
19:45

East Kilbride	2–2	Clyde
Erskine 4'; Victoria 30'		Jones 11'; Goodwillie 26'
Penalties
McLaughlin (penalty missed); Stewart (penalty missed); Rodgers (penalty scored); McAninch (penalty scored); Old (penalty scored)	3–4	(penalty missed) Goodwillie; (penalty scored) Cunningham; (penalty scored) Kennedy; (penalty scored) Docherty; (penalty scored) Balatoni

K-Park Training Academy, East Kilbride
Attendance: 270
Referee: Duncan Williams
20 July 2021
19:45

Kilmarnock	1–1	Greenock Morton
Connell 90+1'		McGregor 16'
Penalties
Burke (penalty missed); Armstrong (penalty scored); Polworth (penalty scored); Connell (penalty missed); F. Murray (penalty scored); Alston (penalty scored)	4–3	(penalty scored) Lithgow; (penalty missed) Strapp; (penalty scored) Oliver; (penalty scored) Ugwu; (penalty missed) McLean; (penalty missed) Jacobs

Rugby Park, Kilmarnock
Attendance: 2,000
Referee: Barry Cook
24 July 2021
15:00

Kilmarnock	2–1	Stranraer
F. Murray 38'; Burke 66'		Walker 53'

Rugby Park, Kilmarnock
Attendance: 2,000
Referee: Graham Grainger
24 July 2021
15:00

Greenock Morton	2–1	Clyde
Muirhead 63', 68'		Love 56'

Cappielow, Greenock
Attendance: 339
Referee: Scott Lambie

Notes

1. E: East Kilbride were awarded a technical 3−0 win over Kilmarnock, who fielded an ineligible player. The match had originally finished 2–0 to Kilmarnock.
2. F: Stranraer were awarded a technical 3−0 win over Greenock Morton, who were unable to raise a team after a COVID-19 outbreak among players and staff.

=== Group H ===
Pos	Team	Pld	W	PW	PL	L	GF	GA	GD	Pts	Qualification	STM	DNF	PAR	STE	DUM
1	St Mirren	4	4	0	0	0	9	1	+8	12	Qualification for the second round	—	1–0	2–0	—	—
2	Dunfermline Athletic	4	3	0	0	1	13	5	+8	9	Qualification for the second round	—	—	—	4–1	5–1
3	Partick Thistle	4	2	0	0	2	6	7	−1	6		—	2–4	—	—	2–0
4	Stenhousemuir	4	1	0	0	3	5	10	−5	3		1–3	—	1–2	—	—
5	Dumbarton	4	0	0	0	4	2	12	−10	0		0–3 (Note: St Mirren were awarded a technical 3−0 win over Dumbarton, who were unable to raise a team after a COVID-19 outbreak among players and staff.)	—	—	1–2	—

Rules for classification: 1) goal difference, 2) goals scored, 3) away goals scored, 4) matches won, 5) away matches won, 6) drawing of lots.

==== Matches ====
10 July 2021
15:00

Dumbarton	0–3 (awarded)	St Mirren

Dumbarton Football Stadium, Dumbarton
10 July 2021
15:00

Partick Thistle	2–4	Dunfermline Athletic
Graham 16'; Rudden 64'		Todorov 30', 53'; Comrie 35'; MacDonald 43'

Firhill Stadium, Glasgow
Attendance: 1,000
Referee: Bobby Madden
13 July 2021
19:45

Dumbarton	1–2	Stenhousemuir
MacLean 40'		Lyon 63'; Thomson 79'

Dumbarton Football Stadium, Dumbarton
Attendance: 200
Referee: Matthew MacDermid
13 July 2021
19:45

St Mirren	1–0	Dunfermline Athletic
Main 30'

St Mirren Park, Paisley
Attendance: 500
Referee: Craig Napier
17 July 2021
15:00

Dunfermline Athletic	5–1	Dumbarton
Todorov 2'; Thomas 4'; Wighton 29'; Buchanan 51' (o.g.); O'Hara 71'		MacLean 56'

East End Park, Dunfermline
Attendance: 1,000
Referee: David Dickinson
17 July 2021
15:00

Stenhousemuir	1–2	Partick Thistle
Orr 32' (pen.)		Rudden 52'; Graham 73'

Ochilview Park, Stenhousemuir
Attendance: 370
Referee: Colin Steven
20 July 2021
19:30

Stenhousemuir	1–3	St Mirren
Orr 76'		Main 50'; Dennis 66'; Erwin 90+4'

Ochilview Park, Stenhousemuir
Attendance: 370
Referee: David Dickinson
20 July 2021
19:45

Partick Thistle	2–0	Dumbarton
Graham 45+1', 52'

Firhill Stadium, Glasgow
Attendance: 755
Referee: Mike Roncone
24 July 2021
15:00

Dunfermline Athletic	4–1	Stenhousemuir
Wighton 15', 44'; O'Hara 36', 49'		Thomson 67'

East End Park, Dunfermline
Attendance: 1,570
Referee: Kevin Clancy
25 July 2021
15:00

St Mirren	2–0	Partick Thistle
McGrath 25' (pen.); Shaughnessy 90'

St Mirren Park, Paisley
Attendance: 1,023
Referee: Alan Muir

Notes

1. G: St Mirren were awarded a technical 3−0 win over Dumbarton, who were unable to raise a team after a COVID-19 outbreak among players and staff.

== Best runners-up ==
Pos	Grp	Team	Pld	W	PW	PL	L	GF	GA	GD	Pts	Qualification
1	H	Dunfermline Athletic	4	3	0	0	1	13	5	+8	9	Qualification for the second round
2	B	Arbroath	4	3	0	0	1	6	3	+3	9	Qualification for the second round
3	D	Livingston	4	2	1	0	1	7	3	+4	8	Qualification for the second round
4	A	Stirling Albion	4	2	1	0	1	8	7	+1	8	
5	C	Forfar Athletic	4	2	1	0	1	6	5	+1	8	
6	E	Hamilton Academical	4	2	1	0	1	5	4	+1	8	
7	F	Queen's Park	4	2	0	1	1	3	2	+1	7	
8	G	Stranraer	4	2	0	0	2	5	3	+2	6	

Rules for classification: 1) goal difference, 2) goals scored, 3) away goals scored, 4) matches won, 5) away matches won, 6) drawing of lots.

== Qualified teams ==
Team	Qualified as	Qualified on	Notes
Heart of Midlothian	Group A winner	20 July 2021	
Dundee United	Group B winner	20 July 2021	Seeded for second round draw
Ayr United	Group E winner	22 July 2021	
Dundee	Group C winner	24 July 2021	Seeded for second round draw
Raith Rovers	Group D winner	24 July 2021	
Motherwell	Group F winner	24 July 2021	
Kilmarnock	Group G winner	24 July 2021	
Arbroath	Best runner-up	24 July 2021	
Dunfermline Athletic	Best runner-up	24 July 2021	
Livingston	Best runner-up	24 July 2021	
St Mirren	Group H winner	25 July 2021	Seeded for second round draw

== Top goalscorers ==
As of 25 July 2021

Rank	Player	Club	Goals
1	(Northern Ireland) Ally Roy	Queen of the South	6
2	(England) Nathan Austin	Kelty Hearts	4
2	(Scotland) Brian Graham	Partick Thistle	4
4	(Scotland) Liam Buchanan	Cowdenbeath	3
4	(Scotland) Jason Cummings	Dundee	3
4	(Scotland) Lawrence Shankland	Dundee United	3
4	(Scotland) Kevin O'Hara	Dunfermline Athletic	3
4	(Bulgaria) Nikolay Todorov	Dunfermline Athletic	3
4	(Scotland) Craig Wighton	Dunfermline Athletic	3
4	(Northern Ireland) Liam Boyce	Heart of Midlothian	3
