= Timeline of Premier Sports =

This is a timeline of Premier Sports, which includes the period when the channel broadcast as Viaplay Sports, and of its former free-to-air channel FreeSports.

== Premier Sports ==
- 2009
  - 25 September – MSK launches, initially to broadcast events which had not been available in Great Britain since the collapse of Setanta Sports as they had not been picked up by rival sports broadcasters but are available through Setanta in Ireland.
- 2010
  - 29 July – MSK and MSK Extra are renamed Premier Sports and Premier Sports Extra.
  - 19 August – Premier Sports announces that it has bought the live and exclusive television rights to thirty matches per season from the Conference National for the next three seasons. The thirty matches selected for broadcast included all five Conference National play-offs.
  - September – Premier Sports begins to show boxing and over the next year, it does deals with Hennessy Sports, AIBI for the World Series of Boxing, ShoBox: The New Generation events in 2011, Top Rank for eight events in 2011-2012 and Spencer Fearon's Hard Knocks Boxing Promotions for six events from York Hall.
- 2011
  - 29 January – Premier Sports begins broadcasting all 38 weeks of racing from the NASCAR Sprint Cup Series. In a one-off deal, Kimi Räikkönen's Camping World Truck Series debut was broadcast live and free-to-view.
  - 12 October – Premier Sports announces that they will broadcast up to 10 live National Hockey League games per week from the 2011–12 season. The rights had previously been held by ESPN America although the channel does broadcast some matches for the remainder of that season.
  - 21 November – Premier Sports begins broadcasting greyhound racing on five nights a week, providing free-to-air coverage of the Greyhound Premier League. It does so until grand finals night in February 2012.
- 2012
  - January – It is announced that Celtic TV and Rangers TV would each air on Premier Sports as a three-hour block on Monday evenings.
  - March – Premier Sports begins broadcasting up to 32 games from the Rugby Football League Championship, Championship 1 and Championship Cup in the 2012 season.
  - 5 July – Premier Sports announces that NHL will continue for a further 4 years on the channel with appropriately 400 games per season being broadcast and complemented by a daily broadcast of Hockey Tonight. Premier later further extends its coverage of NHL which now runs until 2021.
  - 17 August – Premier Sports buys the rights to the French Top 14 league, usually broadcasting two live games per round. It shows the league for just a single season as the rights pass to BT Sport for the 2013/14 season.
- 2013
  - Premier Sports broadcasts 260 hours of Indoor Bowls. The deal includes coverage of the World Bowls Tour International Open, PBA Masters, National Under-25s, EIBA Singles Finals, England Internationals, World Pairs and Premier Threes events.
  - May – Premier Sports broadcasts the Football Conference for the final time.
  - 13 June – Premier Sports Extra closes.
  - 25 October – Four years after launching, Premier Sports finally becomes available on Virgin Media. It launches one day prior to the start of the 2013 Rugby League World Cup and is available to all customers until early 2014.
  - 26 October-30 November – Premier Sports broadcasts its first major international sporting event when it is joint broadcaster with the BBC of the 2013 Rugby League World Cup. The channel also covered live coverage of the 2017 event.
- 2014
  - Premier Sports brings the Belgian Pro League to British screens for the first time.
  - Premier Sports begins showing Gaelic Games.
- 2015
  - 11 June – Premier Sports begins covering Copa América. It also shows the next two editions, ending in 2019 when the right pass to the BBC.
  - July – Premier Sports shows UEFA Champions League and UEFA Europa League qualifiers that include British teams. Premier Sports continues to show these early qualification matches to this day, with its coverage ending at the penultimate stage of qualifying.
- 2016
  - Premier Sports begins showing all 201 games of rugby league from the Australian National Rugby League alongside the NRL Footy Show, State of Origin series, NRL Full Time and Rugby League Back Chat.
  - 2 August – Premier Sports becomes one of the rights holders to the newly expanded Scottish Challenge Cup. It broadcasts games alongside other rights holders BBC Alba and S4C. Previously, BBC Alba had been the sole broadcaster of the competition.
  - November – Premier Sports begins broadcasting France's autumn internationals and in 2018 begins broadcasting Italy's autumn internationals.
- 2017
  - 31 August – Premier Sports launches free-to-air sports channel FreeSports.
  - 4 November-12 December – FreeSports broadcasts cricket's 2017–18 Bangladesh Premier League.
- 2018
  - Premier Sports and Freesports broadcast live and also highlights of the speedway leagues Sweden's Elitserien and the Polish PGE Ekstraliga.
  - 12 February – FreeSports televised pool for the first time.
  - 28 April – FreeSports begins showing live coverage of matches from rugby league’s National Conference League with more than 30 matches to be shown over the course of the season.
  - 30 May-3 June – Premier Sports broadcasts full coverage of the 2018 BDO World Trophy.
  - 21 July – FreeSports begins broadcasting on Virgin Media.
  - 25 July – Premier Sports 2 is launched.
  - 31 August – Premier Sports takes over as broadcaster of the PRO14 Rugby. The agreement sees all 152 games per season broadcast live, with no less than 21 games (one per round) shown live free-to-air on FreeSports. Sky Sports and the BBC had been the previous broadcasters - the BBC had shown the tournament since its inception in 2001.
  - November – Premier Sports announces a six-year deal with the SFA starting in 2019 to show the Scottish Cup. Its live rights include the first 2 picks from rounds 4, last 16 and quarter-finals and first pick of a semi-final. There are also options to show matches in rounds 1-3 and the final and other semi-final non-exclusively with the BBC.
- 2019
  - January – Just four months after going on air, Eleven Sports relinquishes most of its football rights, passing many of them onto Premier Sports. Consequently, Serie A, the Dutch Eredivisie and the Chinese Super League move to Premier Sports.
- 2020
  - 13 January – Premier Sports launches La Liga TV, a full time channel showing Spain’s La Liga.
  - February – FreeSports begins showing the Japanese J-league.
  - 31 May – FreeSports begins showing the Polish Ekstraklasa and Danish Superliga.
  - 30 June – FreeSports is removed from Freesat due to fee disagreements.
  - 13 September – FreeSports begins showing snooker when it begins its coverage of the first-ever ranking edition of the 2020 Championship League. FreeSports also covers the 2021 tournament. The event had previously been shown on ITV4.
  - 6 October –
    - Premier Sports takes over from BT Sport as broadcaster of the Scottish League Cup.
    - Premier Sports begins showing Impact Wrestling. The partnership also sees Impact's weekly programme Impact! broadcast every Wednesday on FreeSports.
  - 27 November – FreeSports begins showing matches from the 2020–21 Indian Super League season.
- 2021
  - 2 March – FreeSports shows test cricket for the first time when it starts showing all tests, ODI’s and T20 fixtures involving Afghanistan and Zimbabwe. This builds on the channel's cricket coverage which had mainly consisted of T10 and T20 events.
  - 27 April – It is announced that Premier Sports will become the title sponsor of the Scottish League Cup. Consequently, for the next two seasons the competition will be known as the Premier Sports Cup. It was also announced that Premier Sports will now show the competition until the 2026/27 season. Last year, Premier Sports had replaced BT Sport as broadcaster of the competition.
  - May – Premier Sports shows Serie A football for the final time as the rights pass to BT Sport for the 2021-22 season.
  - 28 May – Premier Sports begins showing coverage of French rugby union's top flight competition - Top 14. It had previously broadcast the competition in 2012/13.
- 2022
  - Premier Sports beings broadcasting the RFL Championship. Coverage includes the regular season, the Play-Offs in the autumn culminating in the Million Pound Game and every match of the Summer Bash featuring all 14 clubs in a single venue on the same weekend. The deal also includes the 2023 season.
  - 28 February – Premier Sports replaces Sky Sports as the secondary rights holder of rugby league's Challenge Cup. It shows five games from the competition - one match from rounds 4, 5 and 6 and two quarter-finals.
  - 1 June – Premier Sports begins broadcasting Scotland, Wales Northern Ireland and Republic of Ireland UEFA Nations League matches until 2024. The deal also includes live rights to all other matches involving non-UK teams inc Spain, Germany, Italy and Portugal.
  - June – The National Hockey League is shown on Premier Sports for the final time as the UK TV rights move to Scandinavian streaming service Viaplay as part of its UK launch.
  - 30 June – FreeSports is removed from the Freeview platform.
  - 3 August – Premier Sports begins broadcasting on Virgin Media Ireland.

== Viaplay Sports ==
- 2022
  - 21 July – Viaplay Group announces that it has acquired Premier Sports and stated its intention to rebrand the channels as Viaplay Sports network.
  - 1 November – Premier Sports is renamed Viaplay Sports and Freesports is renamed as Viaplay Xtra.
  - 9 December – Viaplay Sports starts showing European Professional Club Rugby's second-tier competition, the EPCR Challenge Cup. This is Viaplay's first major rights acquisition following its acquisition of Premier Sports.
- 2023
  - February – Viaplay Sports becomes the rights holder of the PDC European Tour of 13 live darts events for the next five seasons.
  - November – it is announced that Premier Sports has bought Viaplay out in the UK and would rebrand the channels back to Premier Sports, just a little over a year since they became Viaplay channels.
- 2024
  - 25 January – Viaplay Xtra closes.

== Premier Sports ==
- 2024
  - 9 April – Premier Sports returns as a two-channel service following Viaplay’s completion of the sale of its UK sports channel business back to Premier Sports.
  - August – Premier Sports starts broadcasting 20 matches per season from the Scottish Premiership, and streaming only rights for an additional 30 games from the Scottish League Cup
  - Late autumn – Premier Sports launches a full time rugby union channel followung its capture from TNT Sports of the rights to EPCR’s Champions Cup and Challenge Cup for the next three seasons.
- 2025
  - 25 March – Premier Sports's full time rugby union channel launches as a linear channel, but only on Virgin Media.
- 2026
  - October – Premier Sports will show the 2026 Rugby League World Cup. It will show all games from the men's and selected matches from the women's and wheelchair tournaments.
