= 2021–22 Scottish League Cup =

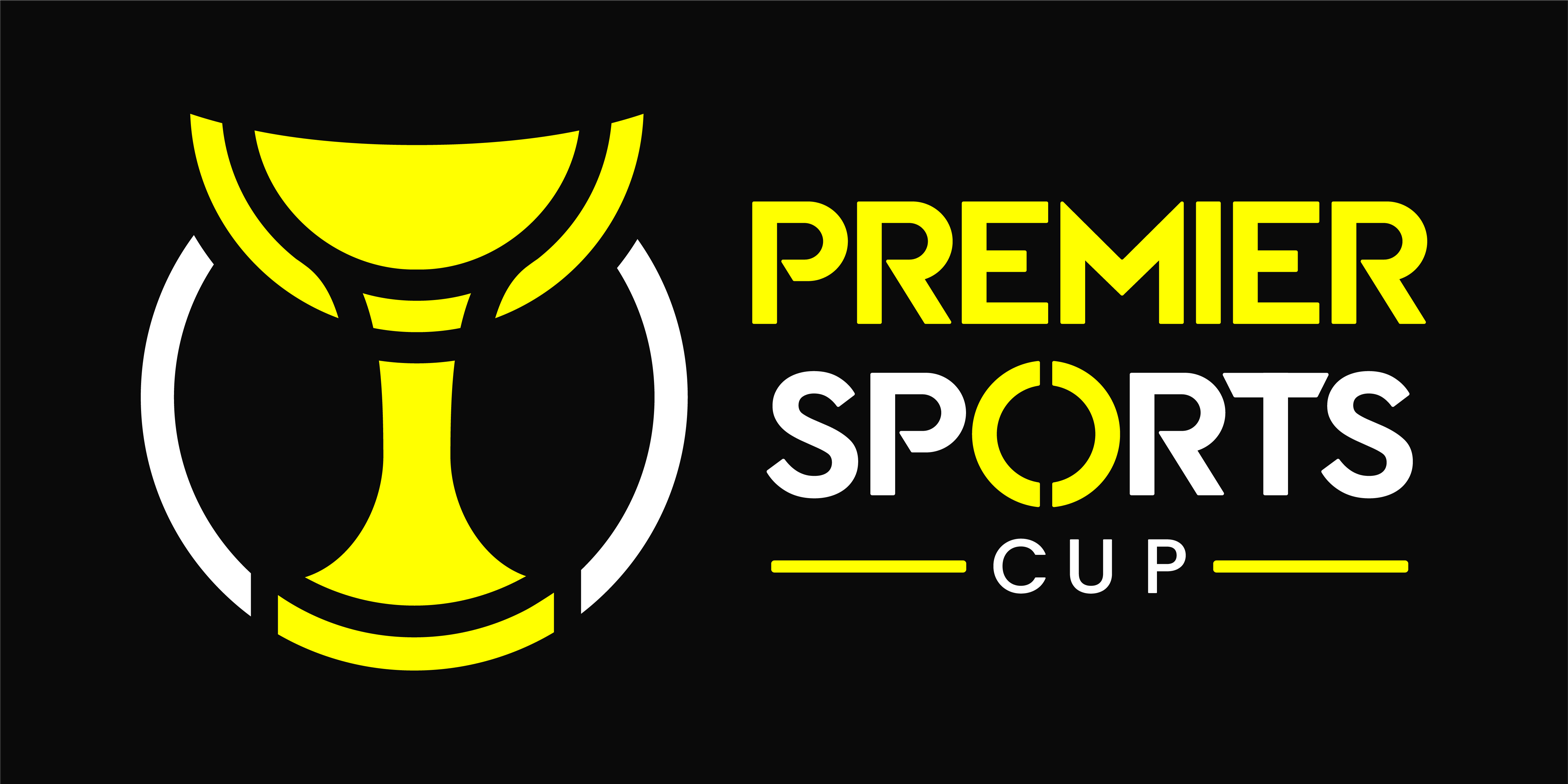
- Premier Sports Cup logo

Tournament details
- Country: Scotland
- Dates: 9 July – 19 December 2021
- Teams: 45

Final positions
- Champions: Celtic (20th title)
- Runners-up: Hibernian

Tournament statistics
- Matches played: 89
- Goals scored: 245 (2.75 per match)
- Top goal scorer: Ally Roy (6 goals)

The 2021–22 Scottish League Cup (also known as the Premier Sports Cup for sponsorship reasons) was the 76th season of Scotland's second-most prestigious football knockout competition.

The format for the 2021–22 competition was similar to the previous five seasons. It began with eight groups of five teams including all 2020–21 Scottish Professional Football League (SPFL) clubs, excluding those competing in Champions League, Europa League and Europa Conference League qualifiers, as well as the winners of the 2020–21 Highland Football League (Brora Rangers) and the 2020–21 Lowland Football League (Kelty Hearts).

A difference from recent seasons was that five clubs were given a bye to the last 16 instead of four, due to increased representation in European competition. This meant that another non-league club (East Kilbride) were invited to round out the group stage.

The domestic broadcasting rights for the competition are held exclusively by Premier Sports, who became the tournament's title sponsor in April 2021.

St Johnstone were the defending champions after beating Livingston 1–0 in the last season's final. They were eliminated in the semi-finals by eventual winners Celtic, who won their 20th title after beating Hibernian 2–1 in the final.

== Schedule ==
Round	First match date	Fixtures	Clubs
Group stage	9 July 2021	80	45 → 16
Second round	13 August 2021	8	16 → 8
Quarter finals	22 September 2021	4	8 → 4
Semi finals	20 November 2021	2	4 → 2
Final	19 December 2021	1	2 → 1

== Format ==
The competition began with eight groups of five teams. The five clubs competing in the UEFA Champions League (Rangers and Celtic), Europa League (St Johnstone) and Conference League (Hibernian and Aberdeen) qualifying rounds were given a bye through to the second round. The 40 teams competing in the group stage consisted of the other seven teams that competed in the 2020–21 Scottish Premiership, and all of the teams that competed in the 2020–21 Scottish Championship, 2020–21 Scottish League One and 2020–21 Scottish League Two. The 2020–21 Highland Football League and the 2020–21 Lowland Football League champions also competed. Due to a fifth Scottish team participating in European competition and receiving a bye to the second round, an extra spot was available in the group stage. This was taken by Lowland League side East Kilbride, after lots were drawn between the Lowland League and Highland League runners-up for the final place in the groups.

The winners of each of the eight groups, as well as the three best runners-up progressed to the second round (last 16), which included the five UEFA qualifying clubs. At this stage, the competition reverted to the traditional knock-out format. The three group winners with the highest points total and the clubs entering at this stage were seeded, with the five group winners with the lowest points unseeded along with the three best runners-up.

=== Bonus point system ===
In December 2015, the SPFL announced that alongside the new group stage format, a bonus point system would be introduced to provide greater excitement and increase the number of meaningful games at this stage. The traditional point system of awarding three points for a win and one point for a draw is used, however, for each group stage match that finishes in a draw, a penalty shoot-out takes place, with the winner being awarded a bonus point.

== Group stage ==
The group stage was made up of seven teams from the 2020–21 Scottish Premiership, and all ten teams from each of the 2020–21 Scottish Championship, 2020–21 Scottish League One and 2020–21 Scottish League Two, as well as the winners and runners-up of the 2020–21 Lowland Football League and the winners of the 2020–21 Highland Football League. The 40 teams were divided into two sections – North and South – with each section containing four top seeds, four second seeds and 12 unseeded teams. Each section was drawn into four groups with each group comprising one top seed, one second seed and three unseeded teams.

The draw for the group stage took place on 28 May 2021 and was broadcast live on FreeSports & the SPFL YouTube channel.

=== North ===
==== Group A ====
Pos	Team	Pld	W	PW	PL	L	GF	GA	GD	Pts	Qualification	HOM	STI	INV	COV	PET
1	Heart of Midlothian	4	4	0	0	0	8	0	+8	12	Qualification for the second round	—	—	1–0	3–0	—
2	Stirling Albion	4	2	1	0	1	8	7	+1	8		0–2	—	—	—	3–1
3	Inverness Caledonian Thistle	4	1	0	1	2	5	6	−1	4		—	2–2p	—	—	2–0
4	Cove Rangers	4	1	0	0	3	6	10	−4	3		—	2–3	3–1	—	—
5	Peterhead	4	1	0	0	3	4	8	−4	3		0–2	—	—	3–1	—

Rules for classification: 1) goal difference, 2) goals scored, 3) away goals scored, 4) matches won, 5) away matches won, 6) drawing of lots.

==== Group B ====
Pos	Team	Pld	W	PW	PL	L	GF	GA	GD	Pts	Qualification	DUN	ARB	KEL	ELG	EFI
1	Dundee United	4	4	0	0	0	9	1	+8	12	Qualification for the second round	—	1–0	—	6–1	—
2	Arbroath	4	3	0	0	1	6	3	+3	9	Qualification for the second round	—	—	3–2	—	2–0
3	Kelty Hearts	4	2	0	0	2	8	5	+3	6		0–1	—	—	—	3–0
4	Elgin City	4	1	0	0	3	5	12	−7	3		—	0–1	1–3	—	—
5	East Fife	4	0	0	0	4	2	9	−7	0		0–1	—	—	2–3	—

Rules for classification: 1) goal difference, 2) goals scored, 3) away goals scored, 4) matches won, 5) away matches won, 6) drawing of lots.

==== Group C ====
Pos	Team	Pld	W	PW	PL	L	GF	GA	GD	Pts	Qualification	DUN	FOR	ROS	MON	BRO
1	Dundee	4	4	0	0	0	14	2	+12	12	Qualification for the second round	—	5–2	—	—	4–0
2	Forfar Athletic	4	2	1	0	1	6	5	+1	8		—	—	3–0 (Note: Forfar Athletic were awarded a technical 3−0 win over Ross County, who were unable to raise a team after a COVID-19 outbreak among players and staff.)	p0–0	—
3	Ross County	4	2	0	0	2	5	7	−2	6		0–3 (Note: Dundee were awarded a technical 3−0 win over Ross County, who were unable to raise a team after a COVID-19 outbreak among players and staff.)	—	—	4–1	—
4	Montrose	4	1	0	1	2	4	6	−2	4		0–2	—	—	—	3–0
5	Brora Rangers	4	0	0	0	4	0	9	−9	0		—	0–1	0–1	—	—

Rules for classification: 1) goal difference, 2) goals scored, 3) away goals scored, 4) matches won, 5) away matches won, 6) drawing of lots.

==== Group D ====
Pos	Team	Pld	W	PW	PL	L	GF	GA	GD	Pts	Qualification	RAI	LIV	COW	ALO	BRE
1	Raith Rovers	4	2	1	1	0	5	0	+5	9	Qualification for the second round	—	—	—	p0–0	4–0
2	Livingston	4	2	1	0	1	7	3	+4	8	Qualification for the second round	p0–0	—	3–1	—	—
3	Cowdenbeath	4	2	0	0	2	5	6	−1	6		0–1	—	—	—	3–2
4	Alloa Athletic	4	1	0	1	2	2	3	−1	4		—	2–1	0–1	—	—
5	Brechin City	4	1	0	0	3	3	10	−7	3		—	0–3	—	1–0	—

Rules for classification: 1) goal difference, 2) goals scored, 3) away goals scored, 4) matches won, 5) away matches won, 6) drawing of lots.

=== South ===
==== Group E ====
Pos	Team	Pld	W	PW	PL	L	GF	GA	GD	Pts	Qualification	AYR	HAM	ALB	EDI	FAL
1	Ayr United	4	3	0	1	0	7	0	+7	10	Qualification for the second round	—	—	—	3–0	3–0 (Note: Ayr United were awarded a technical 3−0 win over Falkirk, who were unable to raise a team after a COVID-19 outbreak among players and staff.)
2	Hamilton Academical	4	2	1	0	1	5	4	+1	8		0–1	—	p2–2	—	—
3	Albion Rovers	4	0	2	1	1	4	8	−4	5		p0–0	—	—	p1–1	—
4	Edinburgh City	4	1	0	1	2	4	5	−1	4		—	0–1	—	—	3–0 (Note: Edinburgh City were awarded a technical 3−0 win over Falkirk, who were unable to raise a team after a COVID-19 outbreak among players and staff.)
5	Falkirk	4	1	0	0	3	6	9	−3	3		—	1–2	5–1	—	—

Rules for classification: 1) goal difference, 2) goals scored, 3) away goals scored, 4) matches won, 5) away matches won, 6) drawing of lots.

==== Group F ====
Pos	Team	Pld	W	PW	PL	L	GF	GA	GD	Pts	Qualification	MOT	QPK	QOS	AIR	ANN
1	Motherwell	4	3	0	0	1	6	4	+2	9	Qualification for the second round	—	—	3–2	—	2–0
2	Queen's Park	4	2	0	1	1	3	2	+1	7		0–1	—	—	0–0p	—
3	Queen of the South	4	2	0	0	2	9	6	+3	6		–	0–1	—	4–1	—
4	Airdrieonians	4	1	1	1	1	4	5	−1	6		2–0	—	—	—	1–1p
5	Annan Athletic	4	0	1	0	3	3	8	−5	2		—	1–2	1–3	—	—

Rules for classification: 1) goal difference, 2) goals scored, 3) away goals scored, 4) matches won, 5) away matches won, 6) drawing of lots.

==== Group G ====
Pos	Team	Pld	W	PW	PL	L	GF	GA	GD	Pts	Qualification	KIL	STR	GMO	EKI	CLY
1	Kilmarnock	4	2	1	0	1	5	6	−1	8	Qualification for the second round	—	2–1	p1–1	—	—
2	Stranraer	4	2	0	0	2	5	3	+2	6		—	—	3–0 (Note: Stranraer were awarded a technical 3−0 win over Greenock Morton, who were unable to raise a team after a COVID-19 outbreak among players and staff.)	1–0	—
3	Greenock Morton	4	1	1	1	1	3	5	−2	6		—	—	—	p0–0	2–1
4	East Kilbride	4	1	0	2	1	5	3	+2	5		3–0 (Note: East Kilbride were awarded a technical 3−0 win over Kilmarnock, who fielded an ineligible player. The match had originally finished 2–0 to Kilmarnock.)	—	—	—	2–2p
5	Clyde	4	1	1	0	2	5	6	−1	5		1–2	1–0	—	—	—

Rules for classification: 1) goal difference, 2) goals scored, 3) away goals scored, 4) matches won, 5) away matches won, 6) drawing of lots.

==== Group H ====
Pos	Team	Pld	W	PW	PL	L	GF	GA	GD	Pts	Qualification	STM	DNF	PAR	STE	DUM
1	St Mirren	4	4	0	0	0	9	1	+8	12	Qualification for the second round	—	1–0	2–0	—	—
2	Dunfermline Athletic	4	3	0	0	1	13	5	+8	9	Qualification for the second round	—	—	—	4–1	5–1
3	Partick Thistle	4	2	0	0	2	6	7	−1	6		—	2–4	—	—	2–0
4	Stenhousemuir	4	1	0	0	3	5	10	−5	3		1–3	—	1–2	—	—
5	Dumbarton	4	0	0	0	4	2	12	−10	0		0–3 (Note: St Mirren were awarded a technical 3−0 win over Dumbarton, who were unable to raise a team after a COVID-19 outbreak among players and staff.)	—	—	1–2	—

Rules for classification: 1) goal difference, 2) goals scored, 3) away goals scored, 4) matches won, 5) away matches won, 6) drawing of lots.

=== Best runners-up ===
Pos	Grp	Team	Pld	W	PW	PL	L	GF	GA	GD	Pts	Qualification
1	H	Dunfermline Athletic	4	3	0	0	1	13	5	+8	9	Qualification for the second round
2	B	Arbroath	4	3	0	0	1	6	3	+3	9	Qualification for the second round
3	D	Livingston	4	2	1	0	1	7	3	+4	8	Qualification for the second round
4	A	Stirling Albion	4	2	1	0	1	8	7	+1	8	
5	C	Forfar Athletic	4	2	1	0	1	6	5	+1	8	
6	E	Hamilton Academical	4	2	1	0	1	5	4	+1	8	
7	F	Queen's Park	4	2	0	1	1	3	2	+1	7	
8	G	Stranraer	4	2	0	0	2	5	3	+2	6	

Rules for classification: 1) goal difference, 2) goals scored, 3) away goals scored, 4) matches won, 5) away matches won, 6) drawing of lots.

== Knockout phase ==
=== Second round ===
==== Draw and seeding ====
Aberdeen, Celtic, Hibernian, Rangers and St Johnstone entered the competition at this stage, after receiving a bye for the group stage due to their participation in UEFA club competitions.

The five UEFA-qualifying clubs and the three group winners with the best record were seeded for the draw.

The draw for the second round took place on 25 July 2021.

Teams in Bold advanced to the quarter-finals.

Seeded	Unseeded
Aberdeen; **Celtic**; **Dundee**; **Dundee United**; **Hibernian**; **Rangers**; **St Johnstone**; St Mirren	Arbroath†; Ayr United†; Dunfermline Athletic†; Heart of Midlothian; Kilmarnock†; **Livingston**; Motherwell; **Raith Rovers**†

Notes

- † denotes teams playing in the Championship.

==== Matches ====
13 August 2021	**Rangers**	**5–0**	Dunfermline Athletic	Glasgow
19:30	Lundstram 3'; Wright 17'; Hagi 19'; Roofe 33', 58' (pen.)			Stadium: Ibrox Stadium; Attendance: 41,467; Referee: Willie Collum

14 August 2021	Ayr United	**1–1** (a.e.t.) (**3–4** p)	**Dundee United**	Ayr
15:00	Adeloye 56'		Clark 80' (pen.)	Stadium: Somerset Park; Attendance: 2,196; Referee: Nick Walsh
	**Penalties**
	Muirhead (penalty scored); Reading (penalty missed); McGinty (penalty scored); McAllister (penalty scored); Afolabi (penalty missed)		(penalty missed) McNulty; (penalty scored) Mulgrew; (penalty scored) Pawlett; (penalty scored) Robson; (penalty scored) Clark

14 August 2021	**Dundee**	**1–0**	Motherwell	Dundee
15:00	Ashcroft 78'			Stadium: Dens Park; Attendance: 3,700; Referee: Kevin Clancy

14 August 2021	**Livingston**	**1–1** (a.e.t.) (**4–3** p)	St Mirren	Livingston
15:00	Forrest 41'		McCarthy 82'	Stadium: Almondvale Stadium; Attendance: 1,855; Referee: David Munro
	**Penalties**
	Shinnie (penalty scored); Kelly (penalty scored); Jacobs (penalty missed); Sibbald (penalty missed); Obileye (penalty scored); Holt (penalty scored)		(penalty missed) Main; (penalty scored) McGrath; (penalty scored) Shaughnessy; (penalty missed) MacPherson; (penalty scored) Erwin; (penalty missed) McAllister

15 August 2021	**Raith Rovers**	**2–1**	Aberdeen	Kirkcaldy
12:00	Varian 48'; Zanatta 78'		Emmanuel-Thomas 13'	Stadium: Stark's Park; Attendance: 3,297; Referee: Steven McLean

15 August 2021	Arbroath	**2–2** (a.e.t.) (**2–3** p)	**St Johnstone**	Arbroath
14:00	Nouble 31'; O'Brien 93'		Middleton 59'; McCart 105'	Stadium: Gayfield Park; Attendance: 1,842; Referee: Colin Steven
	**Penalties**
	Little (penalty missed); Henderson (penalty scored); Hilson (penalty missed); Low (penalty scored); Linn (penalty missed)		(penalty scored) Craig; (penalty scored) Hendry; (penalty missed) Booth; (penalty missed) Kerr; (penalty scored) McCann

15 August 2021	**Hibernian**	**2–0**	Kilmarnock	Edinburgh
14:00	Magennis 51'; Nisbet 73'			Stadium: Easter Road; Attendance: 5,990; Referee: Bobby Madden

15 August 2021	**Celtic**	**3–2**	Heart of Midlothian	Glasgow
15:00	Édouard 29'; Welsh 34'; Furuhashi 63'		Boyce 57' (pen.); McEneff 90+2'	Stadium: Celtic Park; Attendance: 42,361; Referee: John Beaton

=== Quarter-finals ===
==== Draw ====
Teams in Bold advanced to the semi-finals.

==== Matches ====
22 September 2021	**Rangers**	**2–0**	Livingston	Glasgow
19:45	Roofe 48'; Morelos 63'			Stadium: Ibrox Stadium; Attendance: 35,579; Referee: Don Robertson

22 September 2021	Dundee	**0–2**	**St Johnstone**	Dundee
19:45			Rooney 70'; Crawford 84'	Stadium: Dens Park; Attendance: 4,707; Referee: Steven McLean

23 September 2021	**Celtic**	**3–0**	Raith Rovers	Glasgow
19:45	Jota 26'; Abada 40'; Turnbull 47'			Stadium: Celtic Park; Attendance: 26,714; Referee: David Munro

23 September 2021	Dundee United	**1–3**	**Hibernian**	Dundee
19:45	Pawlett 58'		Newell 3'; Allan 37'; Boyle 45' (pen.)	Stadium: Tannadice Park; Attendance: 5,395; Referee: Willie Collum

=== Semi-finals ===
==== Draw ====
The draw for the semi-finals took place on 23 September 2021 live on Premier Sports following the Celtic v Raith Rovers match.

==== Matches ====
20 November 2021	**Celtic**	**1–0**	St Johnstone	Glasgow
17:15	Forrest 73'			Stadium: Hampden Park; Attendance: 42,298; Referee: Nick Walsh

21 November 2021	Rangers	**1–3**	**Hibernian**	Glasgow
16:00	Arfield 40'		Boyle 9', 21', 38' (pen.)	Stadium: Hampden Park; Attendance: 45,014; Referee: Kevin Clancy

== Final ==
19 December 2021
15:00

Hibernian	1–2	Celtic
Hanlon 51'	Report	Furuhashi 52', 72'

Hampden Park, Glasgow
Attendance: 48,540
Referee: John Beaton

== Media coverage ==
The domestic broadcasting rights for the competition are held exclusively by Premier Sports who will broadcast between 12 and 16 Premier Sports Cup live matches per season as well as highlights.

The following matches were broadcast live on UK television:

Round	Date	Match
Group Stage	9 July 2021	Kelty Hearts v Dundee United
Group Stage	13 July 2021	Heart of Midlothian v Cove Rangers
Group Stage	14 July 2021	Queen's Park v Motherwell
Group Stage	18 July 2021	~~Ross County v Dundee~~
Group Stage	21 July 2021	Airdrieonians v Motherwell
Group Stage	25 July 2021	St Mirren v Partick Thistle; Heart of Midlothian v Inverness CT
Second Round	13 August 2021	Rangers v Dunfermline Athletic
Second Round	15 August 2021	Raith Rovers v Aberdeen; Celtic v Heart of Midlothian
Quarter-finals	22 September 2021	Dundee v St Johnstone; Rangers v Livingston
Quarter-finals	23 September 2021	Celtic v Raith Rovers; Dundee United v Hibernian
Semi-finals	20 November 2021	Celtic v St Johnstone
Semi-finals	21 November 2021	Rangers v Hibernian
Final	19 December 2021	Hibernian v Celtic

Notes

1. A: Dundee were awarded a technical 3−0 win over Ross County, who were unable to raise a team after a COVID-19 outbreak among players and staff.

== Top goalscorers ==
As of 21 November 2021

Rank	Player	Club	Goals
1	(Northern Ireland) Ally Roy	Queen of the South	6
2	(Northern Ireland) Liam Boyce	Heart of Midlothian	4
2	(Australia) Martin Boyle	Hibernian	4
2	(England) Nathan Austin	Kelty Hearts	4
2	(Scotland) Brian Graham	Partick Thistle	4
