= 2021–22 Raith Rovers F.C. season =

Raith Rovers
2021–22 season
- Chairman: John Sim (until 8 April 2022); Steven MacDonald (from 8 April 2022)
- Manager: John McGlynn
- Stadium: Stark's Park
- Championship: 5th
- Scottish Cup: Fifth round
- League Cup: Quarter-finals
- Challenge Cup: Winners
- Top goalscorer: League: Dario Zanatta (8 goals); All: Matej Poplatnik (11 goals)
- Highest home attendance: 3,417
- Lowest home attendance: 500
- Average home league attendance: 1,681
Home colours	Away colours

The 2021–22 season was Raith Rovers' second season back in the second tier of Scottish football after being promoted from Scottish League One at the end of the 2019–20 season. Raith Rovers also competed in the League Cup, Challenge Cup & the Scottish Cup.

== Summary ==
=== Management ===
Raith were led by manager John McGlynn. The 2021–22 season was his fourth season at the club.

== Results & fixtures ==
Win Draw Loss Postponed

=== Friendlies ===
26 June 2021 Friendly	Raith Rovers	4–1	Stranraer	Stark's Park
14:00	Connolly 50'; Vaughan 53'; Spencer 62'; Mitchell 89'	Raith Report	Ross 7'	Attendance: 450; Referee: Scott Lambie

29 June 2021 Friendly	Raith Rovers	0–1	Clyde	Stark's Park
19:30		Raith Report	Lamont 54'	Attendance: 0 Referee: Mike Roncone

3 July 2021 Friendly	Raith Rovers	2–2	Queen's Park	Stark's Park
14:00	Connolly 27'; Poplatnik 72'	Raith Report	Longridge 50'; Baynham 54'	Attendance: 445; Referee: Duncan Williams

16 July 2021 Iain Davidson Testimonial	Raith Rovers	1–3	Hibernian	Stark's Park
19:00	Connolly 37'	Raith Report	Porteous 3'; Bradley 29'; Nisbet 31'	Attendance: 1,000; Referee: Peter Stuart

=== Scottish Championship ===
31 July 2021 1	Raith Rovers	4–4	Hamilton Academical	Stark's Park
15:00	Vaughan 13' (pen.), 65'; Zanatta 25'; Connolly 52'	Raith Report	MacDonald 68', 83'; Ryan 78'; Want 90'	Attendance: 1,569; Referee: Nick Walsh

7 August 2021 2	Inverness Caledonian Thistle	1–0	Raith Rovers	Caledonian Stadium
15:00	MacGregor 80'	Raith Report		Attendance: 1,675; Referee: Alan Muir

7 September 2021 3	Ayr United	0–2	Raith Rovers	Somerset Park
18:00		Raith Report	Varian 14'; Zanatta 25'	Attendance: 1,204; Referee: Chris Graham

11 September 2021 4	Raith Rovers	0–1	Queen of the South	Stark's Park
15:00		Raith Report	Connelly 12'	Attendance: 1,640; Referee: Craig Napier

18 September 2021 5	Greenock Morton	0–1	Raith Rovers	Cappielow
15:00		Raith Report	Zanatta 33'	Attendance: 1,420; Referee: Colin Steven

26 September 2021 6	Raith Rovers	3–2	Partick Thistle	Stark's Park
15:00	Zanatta 22'; Benedictus 64' (pen.), 78'	Raith Report	Turner 86'; Rudden 90'	Attendance: 1,781; Referee: Andrew Dallas

29 September 2021 7	Raith Rovers	1–1	Dunfermline Athletic	Stark's Park
19:05	Zanatta 11'	Raith Report	O'Hara 79'	Attendance: 2,876; Referee: Euan Anderson

2 October 2021 8	Kilmarnock	1–3	Raith Rovers	Rugby Park
15:00	Hendry 76'	Raith Report	Dick 20'; Poplatnik 82', 90'	Attendance: 4,008; Referee: Willie Collum

16 October 2021 9	Raith Rovers	2–1	Arbroath	Stark's Park
15:00	Tait 3'; Matthews 45'	Raith Report	Dowds 90'	Attendance: 1,748; Referee: Steven McLean

23 October 2021 10	Raith Rovers	1–1	Inverness Caledonian Thistle	Stark's Park
15:00	Connolly 62'	Raith Report	Welsh 79'	Attendance: 1,900; Referee: Colin Steven

26 October 2021 11	Dunfermline Athletic	1–1	Raith Rovers	East End Park
19:45	Thomas 50'	Raith Report	Spencer 88'	Attendance: 4,450; Referee: Alan Muir

30 October 2021 12	Raith Rovers	2–1	Ayr United	Stark's Park
15:00	Ross 12'; Zanatta 27'	Raith Report	Baird 71'	Attendance: 1,602; Referee: Greg Aitken

6 November 2021 13	Queen of the South	1–1	Raith Rovers	Palmerston Park
15:00	Johnston 49'	Raith Report	Connolly 72'	Attendance: 964; Referee: Kevin Clancy

13 November 2021 14	Hamilton Academical	0–3	Raith Rovers	Fountain of Youth Stadium
15:00		Raith Report	MacDonald 6' (o.g.); Ross 34', 45'	Attendance: 1,303; Referee: Peter Stuart

20 November 2021 15	Raith Rovers	2–1	Greenock Morton	Stark's Park
15:00	Connolly 31'; Ross 67'	Raith Report	Ledger 5'	Attendance: 1,640; Referee: Steven Kirkland

4 December 2021 16	Arbroath	0–0	Raith Rovers	Gayfield Park
15:00		Raith Report		Attendance: 1,539; Referee: Craig Napier

11 December 2021 17	Raith Rovers	1–0	Kilmarnock	Stark's Park
15:00	Zanatta 58' (pen.)	Raith Report		Attendance: 2,426; Referee: Willie Collum

18 December 2021 18	Partick Thistle	1–0	Raith Rovers	Firhill Stadium
15:00	Turner 90'	Raith Report		Attendance: 2,229; Referee: Steven Kirkland

26 December 2021 19	Ayr United	2–0	Raith Rovers	Somerset Park
15:00	Adeloye 22'; McKenzie 76'	Raith Report		Attendance: 472; Referee: David Dickinson

2 January 2022 21	Raith Rovers	0–0	Dunfermline Athletic	Stark's Park
15:00		Raith Report		Attendance: 500; Referee: David Munro

8 January 2022 22	Inverness Caledonian Thistle	1–1	Raith Rovers	Caledonian Stadium
15:00	McAlear 86'	Raith Report	Ross 24'	Attendance: 478; Referee: Don Robertson

15 January 2022 23	Raith Rovers	1–2	Arbroath	Stark's Park
15:00	Tumilty 42'	Raith Report	J.Hamilton 47'; Low 82' (pen.)	Attendance: 500; Referee: Steven McLean

28 January 2022 24	Greenock Morton	2–2	Raith Rovers	Cappielow
19:45	Ugwu 25'; Muirhead 75'	Raith Report	Gullan 42' (pen.); Tumilty 45'	Attendance: 1,404; Referee: David Dickinson

1 February 2022 20	Raith Rovers	3–3	Queen of the South	Stark's Park
19:45	Zanatta 9'; Connolly 13'; Poplatnik 83'	Raith Report	Liddle 17'; Cooper 48'; Gordon 85'	Attendance: 1,005; Referee: Grant Irvine

5 February 2022 25	Raith Rovers	0–0	Hamilton Academical	Stark's Park
15:00		Raith Report		Attendance: 1,136; Referee: Bobby Madden

19 February 2022 26	Kilmarnock	3–0	Raith Rovers	Rugby Park
15:00	McGinn 5'; Lafferty 12', 63'	Raith Report		Attendance: 4,080; Referee: John Beaton

26 February 2022 27	Raith Rovers	0–0	Partick Thistle	Stark's Park
15:00		Raith Report		Attendance: 1,759; Referee: Willie Collum

5 March 2022 28	Raith Rovers	0–4	Ayr United	Stark's Park
15:00		Raith Report	Adeloye 3'; Maxwell 32', 38'; Ashford 65'	Attendance: 1,513; Referee: Don Robertson

12 March 2022 29	Queen of the South	0–1	Raith Rovers	Palmerston Park
15:00		Raith Report	Poplatnik 21'	Attendance: 1,091; Referee: David Dickinson

19 March 2022 30	Raith Rovers	2–3	Inverness Caledonian Thistle	Stark's Park
15:00	Connolly 13'; Poplatnik 30'	Raith Report	Sutherland 27'; Chalmers 89', 90'	Attendance: 1,591; Referee: Colin Steven

26 March 2022 31	Arbroath	3–3	Raith Rovers	Gayfield Park
15:00	J.Hamilton 1'; Hilson 67'; McKenna 70'	Raith Report	Poplatnik 31'; Connolly 48'; Varian 65'	Attendance: 2,118; Referee: Alan Muir

6 April 2022 32	Dunfermline Athletic	2–0	Raith Rovers	East End Park
19:45	O'Hara 33', 79'	Raith Report		Attendance: 5,199; Referee: Nick Walsh

9 April 2022 33	Raith Rovers	0–1	Greenock Morton	Stark's Park
15:00		Raith Report	Muirhead 65'	Attendance: 1,660; Referee: Matthew MacDermid

16 April 2022 34	Partick Thistle	0–1	Raith Rovers	Firhill Stadium
15:00		Raith Report	Poplatnik 90'	Attendance: 2,644; Referee: David Munro

23 April 2022 35	Hamilton Academical	0–2	Raith Rovers	Fountain of Youth Stadium
15:00		Raith Report	Williamson 11', 58'	Attendance: 1,478; Referee: Steven McLean

29 April 2022 36	Raith Rovers	1–1	Kilmarnock	Stark's Park
19:45	Connolly 30'	Raith Report	Shaw 50'	Attendance: 3,417; Referee: Greg Aitken

=== Scottish Cup ===
27 November 2021 Third round	Falkirk	1–2	Raith Rovers	Falkirk Stadium
15:00	Morrison 50'	Raith Report	Matthews 27'; Ross 84'	Attendance: 2,512; Referee: Nick Walsh

22 January 2022 Fourth round	Banks O'Dee	0–3	Raith Rovers	Spain Park
15:00		Raith Report	Stanton 67'; Poplatnik 90'; Connolly 90'	Attendance: 870; Referee: Craig Napier

13 February 2022 Fifth round	Celtic	4–0	Raith Rovers	Celtic Park
16:00	Scales 22'; Giakoumakis 68'; Maeda 71'; Bitton 88'	Raith Report		Referee: Steven McLean

=== Scottish League Cup ===
10 July 2021 Group D	Cowdenbeath	0–1	Raith Rovers	Central Park
15:00		Raith Report	Vaughan 21'	Attendance: 778; Referee: Gavin Duncan

13 July 2021 Group D	Raith Rovers	4–0	Brechin City	Stark's Park
19:45	Vaughan 43'; Spencer 62', 83'; Zanatta 66'	Raith Report		Attendance: 594; Referee: Scott Lambie

21 July 2021 Group D	Livingston	0–0 (6–5 p)	Raith Rovers	Tony Macaroni Arena
19:45		Raith Report		Attendance: 766; Referee: Willie Collum
	Penalties
	Anderson (penalty scored); Sibbald (penalty missed); Montaño (penalty scored); Shinnie (penalty scored); Obileye (penalty scored); Williamson (penalty scored); Longridge (penalty scored)		Benedictus (penalty scored); Tait (penalty missed); Spencer (penalty scored); Varian (penalty scored); Vaughan (penalty scored); Berra (penalty scored); Arnott (penalty missed)

24 July 2021 Group D	Raith Rovers	0–0 (5–4 p)	Alloa Athletic	Stark's Park
15:00		Raith Report		Attendance: 958; Referee: Greg Aitken
	Penalties
	Benedictus (penalty scored); Keatings (penalty scored); Spencer (penalty scored); Varian (penalty scored); Vaughan (penalty scored)		Sammon (penalty missed); Taggart (penalty scored); Scougall (penalty scored); Graham (penalty scored); King (penalty scored)

15 August 2021 Second round	Raith Rovers	2–1	Aberdeen	Stark's Park
12:00	Varian 48'; Zanatta 71'	Raith Report	Emmanuel-Thomas 13'	Attendance: 3,297; Referee: Steven McLean

23 September 2021 Quarter-finals	Celtic	3–0	Raith Rovers	Celtic Park
19:45	Jota 26'; Abada 40'; Turnbull 47'	Raith Report		Attendance: 26,714; Referee: David Munro

=== Scottish Challenge Cup ===
4 September 2021 Second round	Raith Rovers	1–0	Forfar Athletic	Stark's Park
15:00	Riley-Snow 25'	Raith Report		Attendance: 842; Referee: Matthew MacDermid

9 October 2021 Third round	Raith Rovers	3–1	East Fife	Stark's Park
13:00	Tait 35'; Connolly 39'; Poplatnik 62'	Raith Report	Mercer 37'	Attendance: 1,177; Referee: Mike Roncone

30 November 2021 Quarter-finals	Inverness CT	0–0 (4–5 p)	Raith Rovers	Caledonian Stadium
19:45		Raith Report		Attendance: 670; Referee: Barry Cook
	Penalties
	Doran (penalty scored); Harper (penalty scored); Deas (penalty missed); Jamieson (penalty scored); Allardice (penalty scored); Sutherland (penalty missed)		Tait (penalty scored); Berra (penalty scored); Matthews (penalty missed); Varian (penalty scored); Connolly (penalty scored); Dick (penalty scored)

2 March 2022 Semi-finals	Kilmarnock	1–2	Raith Rovers	Rugby Park
19:30	Shaw 43' (pen.)	Raith Report	Matthews 66'; Arnott 87'	Attendance: 2,118; Referee: Grant Irvine

3 April 2022 Final	Raith Rovers	3–1	Queen of the South	Excelsior Stadium
16:15	Poplatnik 16', 70'; Ross 78'	Raith Report	Roy 45'	Attendance: 4,452; Referee: Grant Ivine

== Player statistics ==
=== Squad ===
Last updated 29 April 2022

No.	Pos	Nat	Player	Total		Championship		League Cup		Scottish Cup		Challenge Cup	
No.	Pos	Nat	Player	Apps	Goals	Apps	Goals	Apps	Goals	Apps	Goals	Apps	Goals
1	GK	(Scotland) SCO	Jamie MacDonald	48	0	35+0	0	6+0	0	3+0	0	4+0	0
2	DF	(Scotland) SCO	Reghan Tumilty	48	2	33+2	2	6+0	0	2+0	0	5+0	0
3	DF	(Scotland) SCO	Liam Dick	40	1	26+1	1	5+0	0	3+0	0	5+0	0
4	DF	(England) ENG	Frankie Musonda	22	0	16+2	0	0+0	0	2+1	0	1+0	0
5	DF	(Scotland) SCO	Christophe Berra	38	0	26+0	0	6+0	0	2+0	0	4+0	0
6	DF	(Scotland) SCO	Kyle Benedictus	41	2	28+1	2	6+0	0	1+1	0	4+0	0
7	MF	(Scotland) SCO	Aidan Connolly	46	10	26+6	8	6+0	0	2+1	1	4+1	1
8	MF	(Scotland) SCO	Ross Matthews	41	3	27+4	1	2+0	0	3+0	1	5+0	1
9 - signed on 06/01/22	FW	(Scotland) SCO	Jamie Gullan	11	1	7+2	1	0+0	0	2+0	0	0+0	0
9 - on loan to Montrose from 22/09/21 to 15/03/21 then left	FW	(Scotland) SCO	James Keatings	7	0	0+3	0	0+3	0	0+0	0	0+1	0
10	FW	(Scotland) SCO	Lewis Vaughan	5	4	1+0	2	4+0	2	0+0	0	0+0	0
11	FW	(Canada) CAN	Dario Zanatta	44	10	23+8	8	6+0	2	2+1	0	3+1	0
12	DF	(Scotland) SCO	Tom Lang	20	0	12+4	0	0+0	0	2+0	0	0+2	0
13	MF	(Scotland) SCO	Brad Spencer	26	3	17+2	1	4+1	2	1+0	0	1+0	0
14	DF	(Scotland) SCO	David McKay	12	0	5+3	0	0+3	0	0+0	0	0+1	0
15	MF	(Scotland) SCO	Dylan Tait	29	2	19+1	1	6+0	0	0+0	0	3+0	1
16	MF	(Scotland) SCO	Sam Stanton	21	1	17+0	0	0+0	0	2+0	1	2+0	0
17	GK	(Scotland) SCO	Robbie Thomson	3	0	1+1	0	0+0	0	0+0	0	1+0	0
18	FW	(Republic of Ireland) IRL	Ethon Varian	43	3	21+11	2	2+2	1	1+1	0	4+1	0
19	FW	(Scotland) SCO	Luke Mahady	0	0	0+0	0	0+0	0	0+0	0	0+0	0
20	MF	(Scotland) SCO	Ben Williamson	17	2	13+1	2	0+0	0	2+0	0	1+0	0
21 - left on 02/02/22	FW	(Scotland) SCO	Kai Fotheringham	7	0	1+5	0	0+1	0	0+0	0	0+0	0
21 - joined on 12/02/22	DF	(Scotland) SCO	Sean Mackie	9	0	5+2	0	0+0	0	0+1	0	1+0	0
22	MF	(Scotland) SCO	Ethan Ross	31	7	19+6	5	0+0	0	3+0	1	2+1	1
23	MF	(England) ENG	Blaise Riley-Snow	16	1	2+7	0	3+1	0	0+0	0	1+2	1
24	FW	(Scotland) SCO	David Goodwillie	0	0	0+0	0	0+0	0	0+0	0	0+0	0
25	MF	(Scotland) SCO	Aaron Arnott	20	1	1+10	0	0+4	0	0+1	0	0+4	1
26	FW	(Scotland) SCO	Kieran Mitchell	8	0	0+3	0	0+2	0	0+0	0	0+3	0
27	MF	(Scotland) SCO	Quinn Coulson	0	0	0+0	0	0+0	0	0+0	0	0+0	0
28	GK	(Scotland) SCO	Kyle Bow	0	0	0+0	0	0+0	0	0+0	0	0+0	0
29	DF	(Scotland) SCO	Greig Young	5	0	1+3	0	0+0	0	0+0	0	0+1	0
30	DF	(Scotland) SCO	Adam Masson	0	0	0+0	0	0+0	0	0+0	0	0+0	0
32	GK	(Scotland) SCO	Lewis Budinauckas	0	0	0+0	0	0+0	0	0+0	0	0+0	0
99	FW	(Slovenia) SVN	Matej Poplatnik	44	11	14+17	7	3+2	0	0+3	1	3+2	3

=== Disciplinary record ===
Includes all competitive matches.

Last updated April 2022

Number	Position	Nation	Name	Championship		League Cup		Scottish Cup		Challenge Cup		Total	
Number	Position	Nation	Name	Booked	Sent off (straight red)	Booked	Sent off (straight red)	Booked	Sent off (straight red)	Booked	Sent off (straight red)	Booked	Sent off (straight red)
1	GK	(Scotland)	Jamie MacDonald	1	0	0	0	0	0	0	0	1	0
2	DF	(Scotland)	Reghan Tumilty	4	0	0	0	0	1	1	0	5	1
3	DF	(Scotland)	Liam Dick	4	0	0	0	0	0	0	0	4	0
4	DF	(England)	Frankie Musonda	0	0	0	0	0	0	0	0	0	0
5	DF	(Scotland)	Christophe Berra	3	1	0	0	0	0	0	0	3	1
6	DF	(Scotland)	Kyle Benedictus	5	1	0	0	0	0	1	0	6	1
7	MF	(Scotland)	Aidan Connolly	1	0	0	0	0	0	0	0	1	0
8	MF	(Scotland)	Ross Matthews	5	1	0	0	1	0	0	0	6	1
9 - signed on 06/01/22	FW	(Scotland)	Jamie Gullan	1	0	0	0	0	0	0	0	1	0
9 - on loan to Montrose from 22/09/21 to 15/03/21 then left	FW	(Scotland)	James Keatings	0	0	0	0	0	0	0	0	0	0
10	FW	(Scotland)	Lewis Vaughan	0	0	0	0	0	0	0	0	0	0
11	FW	(Canada)	Dario Zanatta	5	0	0	1	0	0	0	0	5	1
12	DF	(Scotland)	Tom Lang	3	0	0	0	1	0	0	0	4	0
13	MF	(Scotland)	Brad Spencer	6	0	0	0	1	0	0	0	7	0
14	DF	(Scotland)	David McKay	0	0	0	0	0	0	0	0	0	0
15	MF	(Scotland)	Dylan Tait	4	0	1	0	0	0	0	0	5	0
16	MF	(Scotland)	Sam Stanton	4	0	0	0	0	0	0	0	4	0
17	GK	(Scotland)	Robbie Thomson	0	0	0	0	0	0	0	0	0	0
18	FW	(Republic of Ireland)	Ethon Varian	5	0	0	0	0	0	2	0	7	0
19	FW	(Scotland)	Luke Mahady	0	0	0	0	0	0	0	0	0	0
20	MF	(Scotland)	Ben Williamson	2	1	0	0	0	0	1	0	3	1
21 - left on 02/02/22	FW	(Scotland)	Kai Fotheringham	0	0	0	0	0	0	0	0	0	0
21 - joined on 12/02/22	DF	(Scotland)	Sean Mackie	1	0	0	0	1	0	0	0	2	0
22	MF	(Scotland)	Ethan Ross	2	0	0	0	1	0	0	0	3	0
23	MF	(England)	Blaise Riley-Snow	1	1	0	0	0	0	1	0	2	1
24	FW	(Scotland)	David Goodwillie	0	0	0	0	0	0	0	0	0	0
25	MF	(Scotland)	Aaron Arnott	0	0	0	0	0	0	0	0	0	0
26	FW	(Scotland)	Kieran Mitchell	0	0	0	0	0	0	0	0	0	0
27	MF	(Scotland)	Quinn Coulson	0	0	0	0	0	0	0	0	0	0
28	GK	(Scotland)	Kyle Bow	0	0	0	0	0	0	0	0	0	0
29	DF	(Scotland)	Greig Young	0	0	0	0	0	0	0	0	0	0
30	DF	(Scotland)	Adam Masson	0	0	0	0	0	0	0	0	0	0
32	GK	(Scotland)	Lewis Budinauckas	0	0	0	0	0	0	0	0	0	0
99	FW	(Slovenia)	Matej Poplatnik	3	0	0	0	0	0	1	0	4	0

== Team statistics ==
=== League table ===
Pos	Team	Pld	W	D	L	GF	GA	GD	Pts	Promotion, qualification or relegation
3	Inverness Caledonian Thistle	36	16	11	9	53	34	+19	59	Qualification for the Premiership play-off quarter-final
4	Partick Thistle	36	14	10	12	46	40	+6	52	Qualification for the Premiership play-off quarter-final
5	Raith Rovers	36	12	14	10	44	44	0	50	
6	Hamilton Academical	36	10	12	14	38	53	−15	42	
7	Greenock Morton	36	9	13	14	36	47	−11	40	

Rules for classification: 1) Points; 2) Goal difference; 3) Goals scored; 4) Head-to-to head points; 5) Head-to-head goal difference; 6) Play-off (only for deciding promotion, play-off participation and relegation).

=== League Cup table ===
Pos	Team	Pld	W	PW	PL	L	GF	GA	GD	Pts	Qualification	RAI	LIV	COW	ALO	BRE
1	Raith Rovers	4	2	1	1	0	5	0	+5	9	Qualification for the second round	—	—	—	p0–0	4–0
2	Livingston	4	2	1	0	1	7	3	+4	8	Qualification for the second round	p0–0	—	3–1	—	—
3	Cowdenbeath	4	2	0	0	2	5	6	−1	6		0–1	—	—	—	3–2
4	Alloa Athletic	4	1	0	1	2	2	3	−1	4		—	2–1	0–1	—	—
5	Brechin City	4	1	0	0	3	3	10	−7	3		—	0–3	—	1–0	—

Rules for classification: 1) goal difference, 2) goals scored, 3) away goals scored, 4) matches won, 5) away matches won, 6) drawing of lots.

=== Management statistics ===
Last updated on 29 April 2022

Name	From	To	P	W	D	L	Win% (Note: Win% is the percentage of matches won rounded to two decimal places.)
John McGlynn	25 September 2018		50	23	14	13	46.00
