= Drone Champions League =

International FPV drone racing league

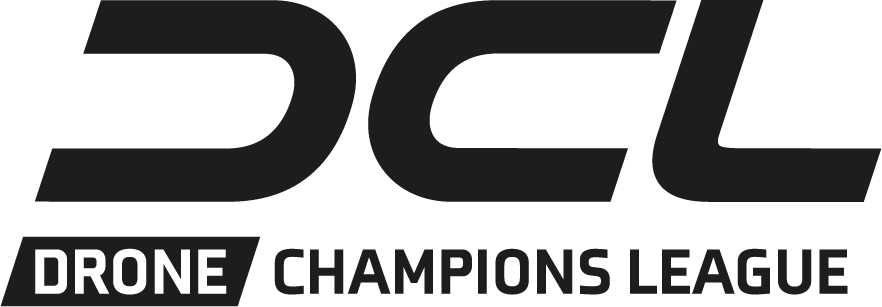
- Sport: Drone racing (FPV)
- Founded: 2016
- No. of teams: 6
- Countries: International
- Website: https://dronechampionsleague.com/

The Drone Champions League (DCL) is an international FPV drone racing league. It organizes physical and virtual drone racing competitions and uses mixed-reality race formats based on digitally recreated environments.

The league also operates the simulation game DCL – The Game, which is available on PC, PlayStation, and Xbox. In addition, DCL has participated in projects related to autonomous flight and has been involved in educational programs related to drone technology.

== History ==
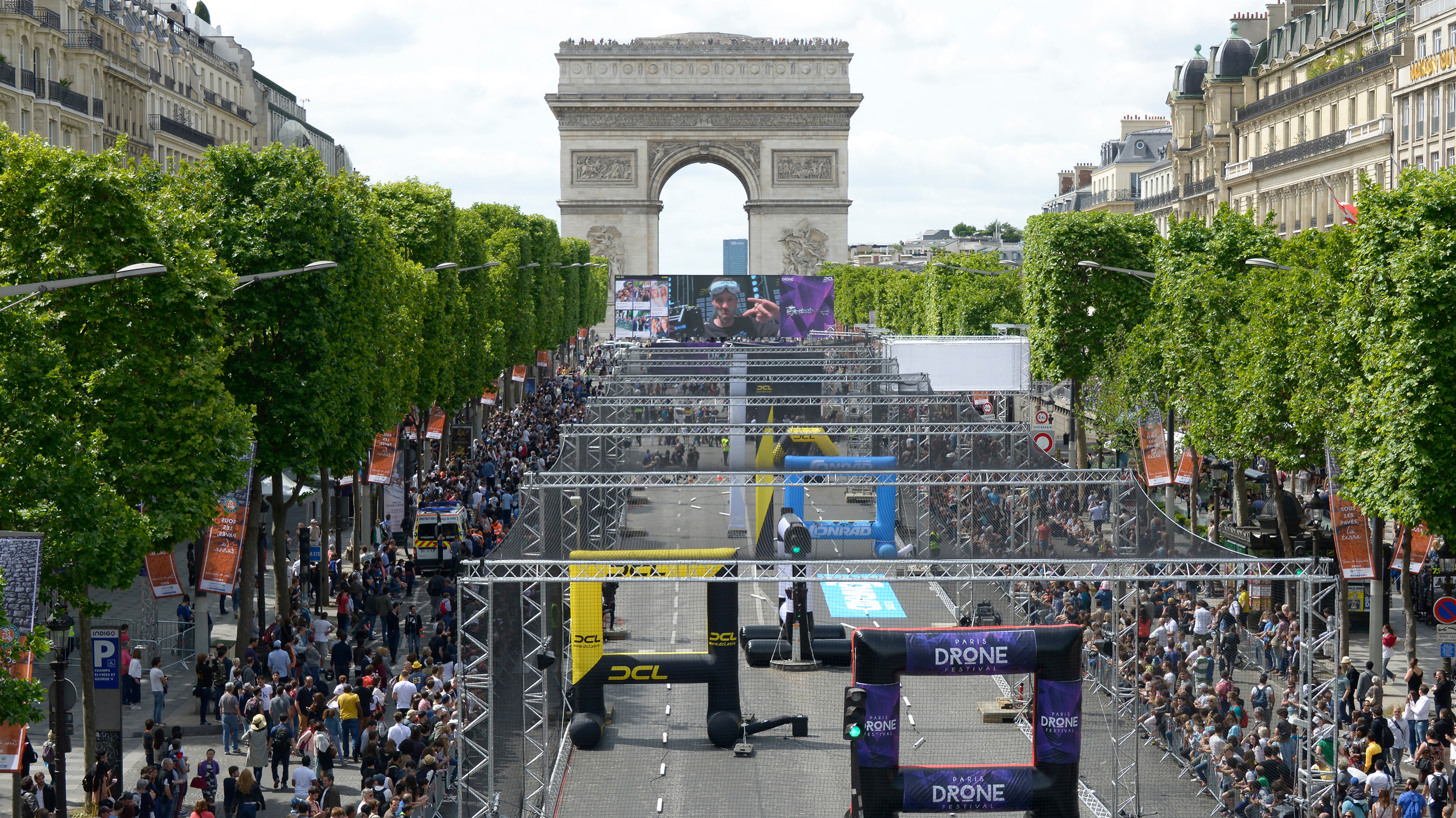
Champs-Élysées, Paris

The DCL was founded in 2016. Early events took place in Reutte, Austria, and Salina Turda, Romania. The first full season began in 2017 and included a race on the Champs-Élysées in Paris.

During the COVID-19 pandemic, the 2020 season was held largely as a simulator-based competition. In subsequent seasons, the league combined physical finals with virtual qualifying and race formats, including events in Abu Dhabi and AlUla.

== Race Format ==
The Drone Champions League organizes both physical and virtual races. For qualification and virtual competition, the league uses its simulator DCL – The Game.

Since 2025, the season format has consisted of three tournaments - the Falcon Cup, Eagle Cup, and Hawk Cup - followed by the Super Final, which determines the season champion.

== DCL - The Game and esports ==
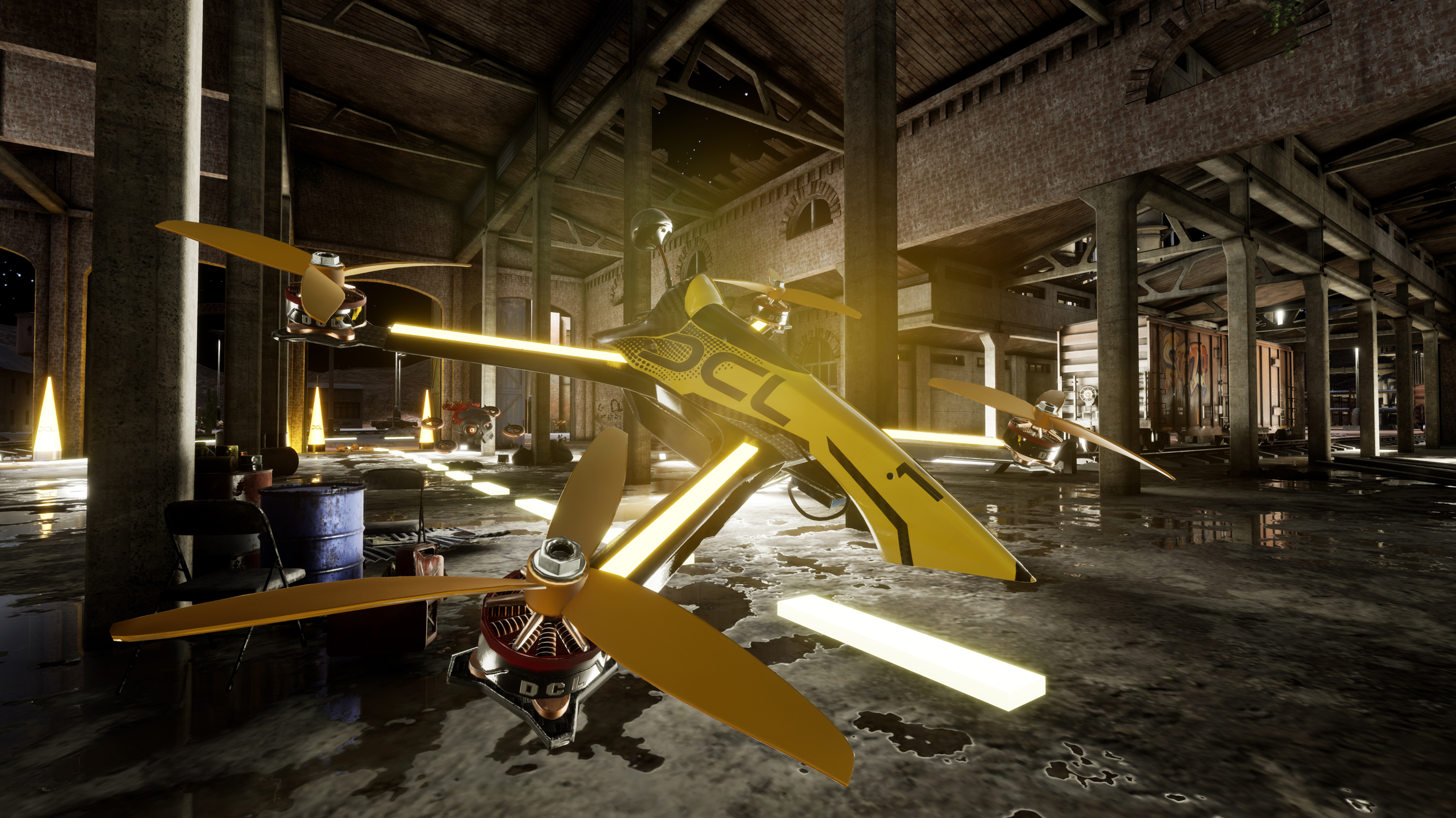
DCL - The Game

In February 2020, the Drone Champions League released its official drone racing simulator, DCL – The Game, for PC and consoles. The game was developed in cooperation with THQ Nordic and is used as both a training tool and an esports platform.

The game includes virtual versions of DCL race tracks and venues and uses a physics-based flight model to simulate racing drone flight behavior. The league has used the simulator within its competition structure; for example, the 2020 season was conducted through online races in the game during the pandemic.

Open online tournaments and draft-based selection events are also used to identify new pilots for DCL teams.

== Autonomous racing and AI Grand Prix ==
DCL has also been involved in autonomous drone racing. In April 2025, the league participated in the A2RL x DCL Autonomous Drone Championship, held in cooperation with the Abu Dhabi Autonomous Racing League.

In January 2026, Anduril announced the AI Grand Prix, an autonomous drone racing competition organized with DCL. Unlike DCL – The Game, which is used for human pilot competition and qualification, the AI Grand Prix is a separate competition for autonomous systems.

In the AI Grand Prix, teams develop autonomy software to control identical racing drones on predefined race courses without human pilots. The competition uses standardized hardware, and modifications to the drones are not permitted. Competitive performance is therefore based on software rather than hardware design.

For the 2026 season, virtual qualifying rounds are scheduled to begin in spring 2026, followed by a physical qualifier in California in September 2026 and a final in Ohio in November 2026.The competition features a total prize pool of US$500,000.

== Partnership with Tuwaiq Academy ==
In January 2026, DCL and Saudi Arabia's Tuwaiq Academy opened the Tuwaiq Drones Hub in Riyadh as part of the 2026 season opener.The opening was held in connection with the live final of the Falcon Cup seeding event.

== STEM and education ==
The Drone Champions League has been involved in initiatives related to STEM education, focusing on the promotion of technical skills and practical learning in fields such as drone technology and data analysis. In 2025, the DCL conducted a multi-week Drone STEM Program for school students in the United Arab Emirates together with UNICEF and the Abu Dhabi Autonomous Racing League.

The program included instruction in drone technology, data analysis, and practical workshops on drone assembly, flight operations, and safety. It was aimed primarily at secondary-school students and was conducted at multiple locations in the United Arab Emirates. Around 100 students participated. Participants could also complete certification under the Trusted Operator Program (TOP Level 1).

== Season overview ==
=== DCL Season 2026 ===
The 2026 season opened in Saudi Arabia.The Falcon Cup seeding phase began with a virtual seeding race on 19 January 2026, followed by a live seeding final in Riyadh on 29 January 2026. The Riyadh event was held alongside the opening of the Tuwaiq Drones Hub.

=== DCL Season 2025 ===
The 2025 season introduced the three-cup format consisting of the Falcon Cup, Eagle Cup, and Hawk Cup, followed by the Super Final.The Super Final took place at Königssee in Germany, where Raiden Racing won the overall title.

=== DCL Season 2024 ===
The 2024 season was held in a split format. The Split 1 final took place at Yas Marina Circuit in Abu Dhabi as part of DRIFTx. The season concluded with the Super Final, where Cyclone Racing won the overall title.

=== DCL Season 2023 ===
The 2023 season concluded with the Super Final in AlUla, Saudi Arabia, which was won by XBlades Racing.
