= Viaplay Xtra =

British sports television channel

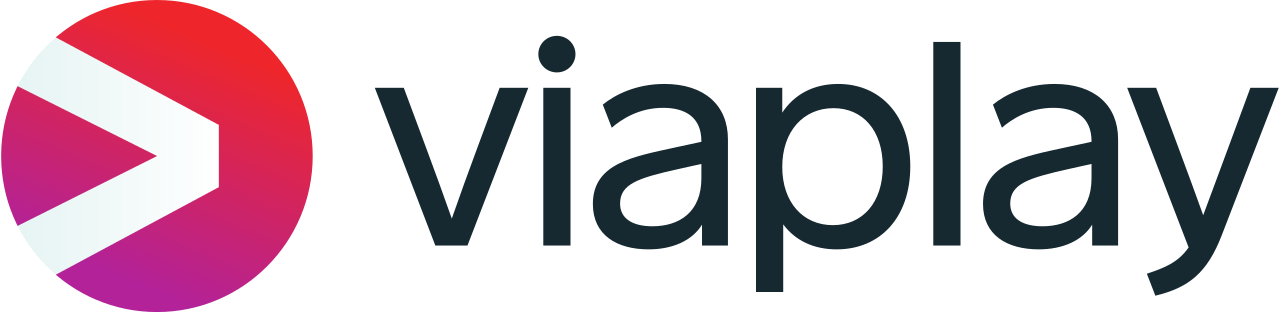
- Country: United Kingdom
- Broadcast area: United Kingdom, Republic of Ireland

Programming
- Picture format: 1080i, 16:9 (HDTV)

Ownership
- Owner: Viaplay Group
- Sister channels: Viaplay Sports 1 Viaplay Sports 2

History
- Launched: 31 August 2017 as FreeSports
- Replaced: FreeSports; Premier Sports
- Closed: 25 January 2024

Links
- Website: viaplay.com/gb-en freesports.tv

Availability

Streaming media
- Freesports Player: Watch live
- Now TV: Watch live (Ireland only)

Former FreeSports logo

Viaplay Xtra was a British sports television channel operated and owned by Viaplay Group.

== History ==
Viaplay Xtra launched as FreeSports on 31 August 2017 and was closed down on 25 January 2024 with the aim to provide free-to-air sports coverage and become a top three dedicated sports channel in the UK. It was available on all major platforms, available in 18 million UK homes. The channel held a partnership with rights holders IMG, MP & Silva, Lagardère Group, Pitch International and Infront Sports & Media. It was a sister channel of Premier Sports. FreeSports released a statement in February 2018 revealing that it would go high-definition (HD) on Sky in summer 2018, however, the channel only remained available in standard definition. In May 2019, a move to HD on Sky UK was set for 15 July 2019.

The channel launched on Virgin Media channel 553 on 21 July 2018. A temporary duplicate launched on channel 130 on Virgin Media at midnight on 22 July 2018, a slot previously vacated by Alibi +1 prior to the UKTV channels' removals, until the network was restored on 11 August 2018. On 25 September 2018, the channel launched in high definition on Virgin Media. The HD version replaced the SD version on Freesat and Sky on 15 July 2019, and the SD version ceased broadcasts on satellite completely a couple weeks later.

In 2019, FreeSports was made available via STV Player, the streaming service of Scottish broadcaster STV. Viewers could watch a live-stream of the channel, as well as view a selection of programmes on demand. FreeSports was removed from STV Player in 2021.

On 8 January 2020, FreeSports was removed from Sky in Ireland. La Liga TV launched on 13 January 2020 on the same channel throughout the UK and Ireland.

On 30 June 2020, FreeSports was removed from Freesat due to fee disagreements.

On 20 July 2021, eir Sport 2 closed on all providers in Ireland. On Sky, it was on channel 422. On 27 July 2021, FreeSports was added to the EPG on Sky in Ireland in its place.

Alongside CBS Justice and Forces TV, FreeSports was removed from the Freeview platform on 30 June 2022.

On 21 July 2022, Viaplay Group announced that it has acquired Premier Sports and Freesports and stated its intention to rebrand the channels as Viaplay Sports network and the new owners renamed Freesports to Viaplay Xtra on 1 November 2022.

On 19 January 2024, it was announced that the channel would close on 25 January. It ceased television operations on that date, with a caption card saying "We will be back shortly", leaving viewers confused as there was never any intention of the channel returning.

== Coverage ==
FreeSports aimed to show the majority of its sports live, with over 1,000 events a year, for an average of 10 hours per day. Numerous sports were broadcast, including association football, combat sports, ice hockey, tennis, rugby league, rugby union, basketball, cricket, Ultimate Pool and snooker.

=== Football ===
The first match shown live was a 2019 UEFA European Under-21 Championship qualifier between the Netherlands and England on 1 September 2017. The channel also initially showed live coverage of the Primeira Liga (two games a week) & Segunda División (one game a week) as well as numerous club TV shows, including Dortmund TV and AC Milan TV. The channel also showed weekly highlights from the National League.

In 2019, FreeSports began airing Eredivisie and Serie A fixtures until 2021 alongside Premier Sports following the decline of online streaming service Eleven Sports, prior to securing rights to Major League Soccer (alongside Premier Sports (2019 only) and Sky Sports) until 2022. They also sealed exclusive rights to the 2018–19 Coupe de France from the quarter-final stage. In May, FreeSports secured rights for the 2019 FIFA U-20 World Cup, the 2019 Toulon Tournament, the 2019 Copa América (encore and highlights only) and the 2019 CONCACAF Gold Cup.

In February 2020, FreeSports also added rights to the Japanese J-league after securing rights in the previous year to the Chinese Super League. In May, FreeSports added two European football rights: the Polish Ekstraklasa (until 2020–21) and Danish Superliga. FreeSports later confirmed it would broadcast the Primeira Liga in July along with the 2020 Taça de Portugal Final between the Portuguese O Clássico rivals Benfica and Porto on 1 August. From 27 November, the channel started showing matches from the 2020–21 Indian Super League season. In December, FreeSports began to broadcast Brazil's Série A; kicking off with Flamengo vs. Santos and Corinthians vs. São Paulo on 13 December. They also added Copa del Rey, with Premier Sports, and CONCACAF Champions League football that month.

In 2022, the channel showed matches from that year's AFC Women's Asian Cup and EMF EURO (minifootball).

=== Ice hockey ===
The National Hockey League fronted the channel's ice hockey coverage with three games a week. Vancouver Canucks captain Henrik Sedin made the announcement on the channel's Twitter account. However, the first live coverage of Ice Hockey was between Nottingham Panthers and Mountfield HK in the 2017–18 Champions Hockey League. As well as NHL and CHL, the IIHF and SHL were also shown live, while the Spengler Cup semi-finals and final were also screened. The Ice Hockey World Championships were expected at this point to be shown on FreeSports including live coverage of games featuring Great Britain.

In March 2018, it was announced that FreeSports would be televising the KHL Playoffs throughout March & April and later announced it had a 2-year extension to televise live KHL from the 2018–2019 season onwards.

On 20 July 2018 FreeSports and the EIHL struck a deal that saw a live game shown every two weeks which also featured highlights, starting with the 2018/19 campaign.

=== Motorsport ===
NASCAR featured on the channel, which broadcast the 2018 Daytona 500: the first time the event was shown on free to air television in the UK. FreeSports also showed the Xfinity Series and Camping World Truck Series showing live as well as highlights of the Monster Energy NASCAR Cup Series. Also live on the channel were Australian V8 Supercars, Swedish and Polish Speedway. There were also highlights of Monster Jam, Arenacross, Formula D, Brisca Stock Car Racing and the FIA World Rallycross Championship. In 2020, the race also aired on sister channel Premier Sports.

=== Pool ===
In February 2018, the International Professional Pool Association (IPA), FreeSports Champions Cup (Blackball) was televised live on FreeSports over the course of three days and was won by Ben Davies. Following this, the IPA FreeSports Pool Cup began on 12 February 2018, with the aim of finding Britain's best Blackball pool player.

In 2019, the IPA world championship was broadcast. It started on Thursday to Saturday 7–9 February, with the final being contested between Marc Farnsworth of England and Tom Cousins from Wales.

=== Professional wrestling ===
5 Star Wrestling was broadcast live on FreeSports from January to March 2018, featuring an array of British and American wrestling talent. During the first twelve shows in the UK wide arena tour, many high-profile wrestlers were on the roster including Rob Van Dam, Rey Mysterio, Zack Gibson, John Morrison, Jack Hager, Adam Maxted, Carlito, Chris Masters and Eddie Ryan.

On 5 April 2019, it was announced that FreeSports and Major League Wrestling (MLW) reached an agreement to broadcast MLW Fusion on the network.

On 2 October 2020, Premier Sports announced a new partnership with Impact Wrestling that saw FreeSports broadcast episodes of Impact's weekly programme, Impact!, every Wednesday. The partnership also saw Premier Sports broadcast Impact pay-per-views and special events, starting with Victory Road on delay on 6 October.

=== Rugby league ===
The channel featured delayed coverage of Toronto Wolfpack games in The Championship and, in conjunction with RugbyAM, live games from the National Conference League. The previous year the channel covered the National Rugby League. However the rights passed to Sky Sports for the 2018 season. The channel also screened some games from the 2017 Rugby League World Cup.

=== Rugby Union ===
FreeSports showed Autumn internationals, including France and Italy matches, and later showed live BUCS Rugby matches.

On 30 April 2018, Premier Sports announced they had signed a landmark partnership to broadcast every game from the Guinness PRO14 live in high-definition across the UK for at least the next three years, with no less than 21 games (one per round) shown live free-to-air on FreeSports.

=== Snooker ===
Snooker was shown on FreeSports, beginning with the 2020 Championship League and then following up with continued televised coverage of the 2021 Championship League. The channel was the primary television broadcaster in the UK and Ireland for the Championship League, where previously it had only been available via betting websites.

=== Cricket ===
- European Cricket Series
- Bangladesh Premier League
- Pakistan Super League
- Mzansi Super League
- 2020–21 Nepal Tri-Nation Series
- Abu Dhabi T10
- Lanka Premier League (from December 2021)
- Broadcast all tests, ODI’s and T20 fixtures hosted by Afghanistan or Zimbabwe from 2021 to 2024.
- US Masters T10 League

=== Other Sports ===
Twenty-five events from the ATP World Tour 250 series, FEI Nations Cup (show jumping), Liga Española de Baloncesto (Spanish basketball), EuroLeague (European basketball), Drone Champions League, World Weightlifting Championships, Crankworx World Tour. Live coverage of major events in the French horse-racing calendar began with the meeting at Chantilly on 10 September 2017. FreeSports also showed boxing roughly once a month on a Friday featuring bouts promoted by Neilson Boxing.

== Previous coverage ==
=== Football ===
In 2018, FreeSports held selected rights for the Copa do Brasil, while they also showed both Copa Libertadores Finals between the Argentine Superclásico rivals Boca Juniors and River Plate; in simulcast with BT Sport.

A year later, the Copa Libertadores final coverage is moved to BBC Sport.

=== Combat sport ===
- MMA: Amateur, International Mixed Martial Arts Federation highlights.
  Professional, Professional Fighters League (PFL); formerly the World Series of Fighting (WSOF). Cage Warriors; joined the channel's portfolio on 7 September 2017, KSW MMA, showing both Mixed martial arts and Kickboxing.
- Kickboxing: Glory
- Boxing: In 2022 Neilson Boxing claimed the exclusive rights to boxing on Box Nation & FreeSports.

=== Basketball ===
The British Basketball League (BBL) signed a deal with FreeSports in January 2018 to broadcast a number of games during the remainder of the 2017–2018 season. The first game broadcast on the channel was the BBL Trophy Final between Worcester Wolves v Cheshire Phoenix. Other live Spanish basketball on the channel is ACB Basketball from the Copa Del Rey series.

=== Cricket ===
The channel broadcast live coverage of the 2017 Bangladesh Premier League tournament and live coverage of 2020–21 Nepal Tri-Nation Series
