= Ethon Varian =

Irish professional footballer

Personal information
- Full name: Ethon Sean O'Driscoll-Varian
- Date of birth: 7 September 2001 (age 25)
- Place of birth: Cork, Ireland
- Position: Striker

Youth career
- 2008–2019: Greenwood
- 2018–2021: Stoke City

Senior career*
Years	Team	Apps	(Gls)
2021–2022	Stoke City	0	(0)
2020	→ Nantwich Town (loan)		
2021–2022	→ Raith Rovers (loan)	32	(2)
2022–2023	Bohemians	13	(2)
2023	→ Cork City (loan)	13	(1)

International career
2021	Republic of Ireland U21	1	(0)
- * Club domestic league appearances and goals as of 16:22, 24 June 2024 (UTC)

Ethon Sean O'Driscoll-Varian (born 7 September 2001) is an Irish professional footballer who plays as a striker.

== Career ==
=== Stoke City ===
Varian was born in Cork and began playing youth football with Greenwood FC in Togher. He moved to England in 2018 joining the Stoke City Academy. Varian spent January 2020 at Nantwich Town on work experience where he scored twice on his debut against Hyde United. In July 2021 Varian joined Scottish Championship side Raith Rovers on a six-month loan. He made his professional debut on 21 July 2021 in a 0–0 draw against Livingston in the Scottish League Cup. His loan was extended in December 2021 until the end of the 2021–22 season Varian made 43 appearances for Raith scoring three goals as they narrowly missed out on a play-off spot. He helped Raith to win the Scottish Challenge Cup after beating Queen of the South 3–1 in the final.

=== Bohemians ===
On 8 July 2022, Varian signed for League of Ireland Premier Division side Bohemians. After 6 months at the club it was announced that he would be joining his hometown club Cork City on loan for the 2023 season.

== International career ==
Varian made his Republic of Ireland U21 debut against Wales on 26 March 2021.

== Career statistics ==
As of match played 29 April 2022

Appearances and goals by club, season and competition
Club	Season	League			FA Cup		League Cup		Other		Total	
Club	Season	Division	Apps	Goals	Apps	Goals	Apps	Goals	Apps	Goals	Apps	Goals
Stoke City	2021–22	EFL Championship	0	0	0	0	0	0	—		0	0
Raith Rovers (loan)	2021–22	Scottish Championship	32	2	2	0	4	1	5 (Note: Appearances in Scottish Challenge Cup)	0	43	3
Career total			32	2	2	0	4	1	5	0	43	3

== Honours ==
Raith Rovers

- Scottish Challenge Cup: 2022
