= Premier Sports =

UK and Ireland sports television channels

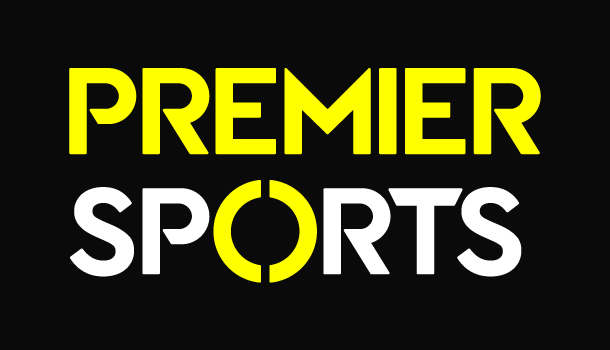
- Country: Ireland
- Broadcast area: United Kingdom, Ireland

Programming
- Language: English
- Picture format: 1080i HDTV

Ownership
- Owner: SSBL Limited

History
- Launched: 25 September 2009
- Former names: MSK/MSK Extra (2009–2010); Premier Sports (2010–present) (Ireland); Premier Sports (2010–2023, 2024–present) (UK); Viaplay Sports (2022–2024) (UK)

Links
- Website: premiersportsireland.com

Availability

Streaming media
- Premier Player: Watch live
- Virgin TV GO: Watch live (UK only)
- Now: Watch live (Ireland only)

Premier Sports is a group of pay sports television channels owned by SSBL Limited that are available in the Republic of Ireland and the United Kingdom.

Premier Sports holds exclusive live rights to La Liga, Scottish League Cup, Elite Ice Hockey League, NHL and NASCAR. Premier Sports has shared rights to the United Rugby Championship in the Britain and exclusive live rights to 53 Premier League games in the Republic of Ireland. They also hold shared rights to the Scottish Cup with BBC Scotland.

== History ==
Premier Sports was formed in 2009 by the Irish businessman Michael O'Rourke, a joint CEO and part owner of Setanta Sports and former director of Premium Sports. The channel initially focused on broadcasting sporting events that had not been available in Great Britain since the collapse of Setanta Sports GB on 22 June 2009, and were not picked up by rival sports broadcasters ESPN and Sky Sports, but are available through Setanta in Ireland. The channel's management is made up of CEO O'Rourke, General Manager Richard Sweeney and Operations Director Richard Webb.

In April 2013, Premier Sports and Premier Sports Extra began to share their satellite stream with Setanta Sports 1; the arrangement continued after Premier Sports Extra closed on 13 June 2013. Only Premier Sports' branding appears on the channel, with the exception of Setanta's coverage of the Premier League, which was blocked on Premier Sports.

It was revealed in July 2022 that in 2021 the company had 222,000 paying subscribers and revenues of £26.4 million in 2021.

In July 2022, Viaplay Group announced the acquisition of Premier Sports in the UK and its intention to rebrand the channels under its own brand. This did not affect its operations in Ireland where the company continued to be owned by SSBL Ltd and continued to branded as Premier Sports Viaplay rebranded Premier Sports under the Viaplay Sports name on 1 November 2022. Viaplay Sports operate out of Stockholm, Sweden.

Initially, the same feeds were used for the UK and Ireland with Premier Sports branding used for Premier League coverage which is blocked in the UK. On 28 November the channels split, with the Irish feeds reverting to full Premier Sports branding.

In November 2023, it was announced that Premier Sports had bought Viaplay out in the UK and would rebrand the channels back to Premier Sports.

== Availability ==
Premier Sports operates on satellite provider Sky. MSK and MSK Extra were added to Sky on 25 September 2009 and relabelled Premier Sports and Premier Sports Extra on 29 July 2010. On 13 June 2013, Premier Sports Extra closed with its Sky EPG slot believed to have been sold to the Muslim World Network, which launched on the same day. Premier Sports Extra only operated for a limited number of hours during midweek, when Premier Sports closed as they used a single satellite stream. The channels were free-to-air to both domestic and commercial customers from launch, but became a pay subscription channel on 5 August 2010. However, the channel is sold independently by Premier Sports, rather than through Sky. On 30 June 2010, the video bit rate was increased from 2.8 Mbit/s to 4.2 Mbit/s.

Initially, Premier Sports was only available in Great Britain, but became available in Northern Ireland on 3 November 2011. Premier Sports Extra was still limited to Great Britain until its closure.

For many years, Premier Sports was not available on Virgin Media, although negotiations were held in early 2012. Talks broke down when the company declined Virgin Media's offer to distribute the channel as a standalone add-on, as it is on satellite, as the former wanted to be bundled into one of the latter's basic TV packages. On 25 October 2013, the channel launched on Virgin Media as a free channel, the day before the start of the 2013 Rugby League World Cup; It became a subscription channel on 1 March 2014. On 22 August 2014, Premier Sports, along with BoxNation, launched on TalkTalk; it was removed on 9 August 2016.

In August 2012, Premier Sports launched an online subscription streaming service, run in conjunction with Ustream. The 2 Mbit/s stream broadcast all events and programming on the TV channel.

In April 2013, Premier Sports launched their own online player to replace the Ustream service. The service is available on multiple platforms including iOS and Android. As well as live streaming, the service also features seven day catch-up and optional season long on-demand content. Some sports are also available to view worldwide.

On 30 April 2018, Premier Sports announced they would launch a Premier Sports 2 channel on the Sky and Virgin platforms after signing a contract with PRO14 Rugby to broadcast every game across the UK for at least the next three years. The HD channel was relabelled Premier Sports 1 on 18 July and launched on Virgin Media, replacing the SD version, which simultaneously was relabelled Premier Sports 2. New logos were adopted for both Premier Sports and its sister channel FreeSports.

== Subsidiary channels ==
On 31 August 2017, Premier Sports launched their sister channel FreeSports, a free-to-air sports channel providing live sport. It was available on all major platforms available in 18 million UK homes. FreeSports aimed to air a majority of live programming, with over 1000 events a year for an average of 10 hours per day featuring numerous sports, including MMA, kickboxing, association football, ice hockey, tennis, rugby league, basketball, boxing, and cricket. On 19 January 2024, it was announced that the channel would close on 25 January.

Premier Sports Asia was launched on 22 October 2020 as an over-the-top (OTT) streaming channel for select Asian regions. The channel is also available as a traditional linear channel (branded as Premier Sports) replacing the RugbyPass TV channel for select Asian countries in late 2021. It takes over some of the rights to air competitions previously held by RugbyPass TV. Unlike the parent channel, Premier Sports Asia only airs rugby union matches.

== Coverage ==
=== Football ===
In 2014, Premier Sports began live coverage of the Belgian Pro League, with three matches from each round of fixtures.

Premier Sports also broadcasts a selection of friendly matches during the football season, such as New York Red Bulls against Arsenal in 2014 and all International Champions Cup matches not involving Manchester United or Liverpool.

In May 2015, Premier Sports announced it had won exclusive multi-year rights to all 26 games of Copa América (including Copa América Centenario in 2016), starting from the 2015 Copa América that ran between 11 June and 4 July.

Premier Sports shows UEFA Champions League and UEFA Europa League qualifiers that include British teams, including Shkëndija versus Aberdeen in July 2015.

In June 2018, it was announced Premier Sports had won rights to start broadcasting English Premier League games on the Saturday 3 p.m. slot exclusively to viewers in Ireland from the start of the 2019-20 season, taking over from Sky Sports. Eoin McDevitt hosts coverage alongside studio pundits, Damien Delaney, Richard Dunne, Kenny Cunningham and David Moyes. The lead commentator is Des Curran, Clive Tyldesley or Will Downing with Gary Breen or Brian Kerr the co-commentators.

In November 2018, Premier Sports announced a 6-year deal with the SFA starting in 2019 to air the Scottish Cup. The exclusive live rights include the first 2 picks from rounds 4, last 16 and quarter-finals and first pick of a semi-final. There are also options to show matches in rounds 1-3 and the final and other semi-final non-exclusively with the BBC.

Also in November 2018, Premier Sports netted the UK and Ireland rights to the Scottish League Cup, currently known as the Premier Sports Cup for sponsorship reasons, for the next five years and will exclusively broadcast between 12 and 16 live Scottish League Cup matches and highlights per season, starting with the 2020–2021 season. As of 2025, Premier Sports will broadcast every game from the second round onwards and many from the first round, though exact matches may vary season-to-season.

In January 2019, Premier Sports had secured rights to the Dutch Eredivisie and the Chinese Super League after Eleven Sports cancelled the competition rights.

In February 2019, it was announced that Premier Sports had secured La Liga rights in the UK & Ireland, showing 4 live matches per round from matchday 25 until the end of the 2018/2019 season. Premier Sports also broadcast weekly highlights, previews and magazine shows. Leading on from this, in September, Premier Sports confirmed that they had become exclusive UK rights-holders to La Liga, starting with matchday 4 of the 2019–20 season until the end of the 2021–22 season. They added that most matches would be put on the LaLigaTV channel, which would become available to all existing Premier Sports subscribers on the Premier Player from October, and on Sky by January 2020. One match per round would be broadcast live on sister free-to-air channel FreeSports. In August 2025, Premier Sports had secured La Liga rights in the UK & Ireland until 2027/28 season, with over 340 live matches per season. In addition, Premier Sports carries the biggest games every week from Segunda división. Disney+ also stream exclusively all late Saturday matches of La Liga.

=== Gaelic games ===
Premier Sports currently has exclusive British TV rights to approximately 75% Gaelic Athletic Association games broadcast live Gaelic games, including all matches from packs 2,3,4,7,8 & 9 from the Championships, All televised National Football League and National Hurling League, the Irish-hosted versions of the International Rules Series between Australia and Ireland, and also the rights to show archived classic Gaelic football and hurling matches in Great Britain.

=== Ice hockey ===
Premier Sports broadcast at least 15 NHL games a week.

On 12 October 2011, Premier Sports announced that they would broadcast up to 10 live National Hockey League games per week from the 2011–12 season. On 5 July 2012, Premier Sport's announced on their Facebook page that NHL would continue for a further 4 years on the channel with appropriately 400 games per season being broadcast and complemented by daily coverage of Hockey Tonight. This deal was later extended until 2021.

The channel also broadcasts weekly games of the Swedish Hockey League (SHL) as well as games from the Kontinental Hockey League (KHL).

Premier Sports also broadcasts live coverage of the Ice Hockey World Championships.

=== Motorsport ===
Premier Sports broadcasts all 38 weeks of racing from the NASCAR Cup Series. In a one-off deal, Kimi Räikkönen's NASCAR Truck Series debut was broadcast live and free-to-view. During the final week of the 2011 NASCAR season, in addition to the main NASCAR Cup Series race, Premier Sports showed the final races in the Nationwide Series and the Truck Series live, commercial free and free-to-view.

On 6 February 2018, Premier Sports announced on their Twitter page that they would continue to broadcast the NASCAR Cup Series for five more years.

In 2018 Premier Sports, and its sister channel Freesports, broadcast live and also highlights of the speedway leagues Sweden's Elitserien and the Polish PGE Ekstraliga.

=== Rugby Union ===
Premier Sports airs France's autumn internationals since 2016, and Italy's from 2018.

On 30 April 2018, Premier Sports announced they had signed a landmark partnership with PRO14 Rugby to broadcast every game from the Guinness PRO14 live in high-definition across the UK and ROI for the next three years. The agreement starting from the 2018–19 season will see all 152 games per season broadcast live, with no less than 21 games (one per round) shown live free-to-air on FreeSports.

On 26 May 2021, Premier Sports announced they will begin broadcasting the Top 14 for two seasons.

On 9 December 2022, Viaplay Sports started showing European Professional Club Rugby's second-tier competition, the EPCR Challenge Cup. The two-season contract was Viaplay's first major rights acquisition since it took over Premier Sports earlier in 2022.

=== Rugby League ===
The channel broadcast live coverage of the 2013 Rugby League World Cup, alongside the BBC's coverage of England games. The channel also covered live coverage of the 2017 and 2026 events.

Premier Sports also provides full coverage of the Four Nations championship.

Premier Sports showed all Toronto Wolfpack games in League 1 in 2017 and all Toronto games in the Championship during 2018.

In October 2021, the channel agreed a two-year deal with the Rugby Football League for coverage of matches from the RFL Championship and the Challenge Cup. The Championship games will include the Summer Bash and the play-off games.

Premier Sports is showing exclusive coverage of the 2026 Rugby League World Cup. It is broadcasting all games from the men's tournament and selected matches from the women's and wheelchair tournaments.

=== Professional Wrestling ===
On 2 October 2020, Premier Sports announced a new partnership with Impact Wrestling that will see future Impact pay-per-views and special events broadcast on the channel, starting with Victory Road on delay on 6 October 2020. The partnership also sees Impact's weekly programme Impact! broadcast every Wednesday on FreeSports.

== Previous coverage ==
=== Bowls ===
On 9 November 2012, it was announced that Premier Sports would broadcast 260 hours of Indoor Bowls in 2013. The deal includes coverage of the World Bowls Tour International Open, PBA Masters, National Under-25s, EIBA Singles Finals, England Internationals, World Pairs and Premier Threes events.

=== Boxing ===
From September 2010, Premier Sports began to air a number of live boxing events, featuring the likes of Lucian Bute, Érik Morales, Shane Mosley and Felix Sturm. On 8 December 2010, Premier Sports announced an exclusive UK deal with AIBI for the World Series of Boxing starting from December. In February 2011, Premier Sports announced they would air all ShoBox: The New Generation events in 2011 and access Gary Shaw's archive of world title fights from the past five years. Premier Sports will also air eight Top Rank events in 2011–2012. On 14 August 2011, the channel signed a deal with Spencer Fearon's Hard Knocks Boxing Promotions that saw six events from York Hall broadcast live, starting on 7 October 2011.

=== Darts ===
From 30 May 2018, Premier Sports aired all 5 days of action for the 2018 BDO World Trophy, which took place at Preston Guild Hall in Preston. Later in the year, 2 England Darts events were shown.

=== Football ===
Premier Sports has from time to time aired football from the League of Ireland.

Since 2011 the channel has broadcast footballing action from South America. The Copa Libertadores was televised exclusively on the channel, with thirty-five live games, plus a weekly highlights package until 2016. Premier Sports also aired thirty matches from the Copa Sudamericana (until 2016), seventy-four matches from the Campeonato Brasileiro Série A and Campeonato Paulista as well as seventy-six matches from the Argentine Primera División.

In January 2012, it was announced that Celtic TV and Rangers TV would each air as a three-hour block on Monday evenings. Coverage included full replays of the weekends matches that were not aired live on Sky Sports or ESPN, pre and post-match analysis and classic archive footage.

The channel had the rights to broadcast the Northern Ireland national football team's home friendlies until 2018.

In July 2016 Premier Sports became one of the broadcasters of the revamped Scottish Challenge Cup, now sponsored by Irn-Bru sharing the rights with BBC Alba and S4C, but only held the rights for one season.

In January 2019, it was announced that Premier Sports had secured rights to Serie A in the UK & Ireland until 2021 with a minimum of 6 games per round being shown on Premier Sports as well as a number of games live on sister free-to-air channel FreeSports. However, after the deal came to an end, the rights to Italy's top football league were bought by BT Sport.

==== Conference National ====
On 19 August 2010, Premier Sports announced that it had bought the live and exclusive television rights to thirty matches per season from the Conference National for a total of three seasons, covering the 2010–11, 2011–12 and 2012–13 seasons. The thirty matches selected for broadcast included all five Conference National play-offs. The deal with the Football Conference was a revenue sharing arrangement whereby clubs would receive 50% of revenue from subscriptions, on top of the normal rights fee paid by the broadcaster, once the costs of production had been met. The Conference would also earn 50% from all internet revenue associated with the deal and retain advertising rights allied to those adverts shown with their matches.

However, Premier Sports announced on Facebook in April 2011 that the company had failed to attract enough viewers to its Conference football broadcasts to share any revenue with the clubs beyond the £5,000 broadcast fee paid to home clubs and £1,000 to away clubs. "It is a shame the number did not reach the point where revenue sharing became an option," said a Premier Sports spokesperson on its Facebook discussion board.

In May 2013, the rights for the 2013–14 season were awarded to BT Sport.

=== Greyhound racing ===
In November 2011, Premier Sports agreed to broadcast five nights of free-to-air coverage from the Greyhound Premier League, up to grand finals night in February 2012.

=== Handball ===
On 3 October 2012, the European Handball Federation announced that Premier Sports had acquired the rights to the EHF Champions League and would be broadcasting one game per week in full either live or delayed as well as the weekly highlights package.

=== Mixed martial arts ===
In March 2011, Premier Sports and Cage Warriors announced a partnership that would see the final eight Cage Warriors events planned for 2011 being broadcast live and available free-to-view on the channel.

On 15 August 2011, UFC Live: Hardy vs. Lytle was shown free-to-view on Premier Sports, in addition to free coverage on UFC.tv. A similar deal was put in place for UFC Live: Cruz vs. Johnson on 2 October 2011 and UFC on Fox: Velasquez vs. Dos Santos on 13 November 2011.

On 31 December 2012 Glory Sports International promoted their Dream 18 & Glory 4 Tokyo ~ Special 2012 ~ New Year's Eve card from the Saitama Super Arena in Saitama, Japan. The event was broadcast live and available free-to-view on the channel.

=== Motorsport ===
Premier Sports aired all 24 weeks of the Swedish Elite League Speedway live in 2011, with a two-year extension announced in April 2012.

The channel aired twenty dates from the 2011 BriSCA F1 Stock Cars season and exclusive highlights of the NASCAR series during the second half of the 2011 season. In January 2012, Premier Sports signed a 2-year extension with BriSCA F1 for highlights from 24 races per season.

=== Rugby League ===
On 18 October 2011, it was announced that up to 32 games from the Rugby Football League Championship, Championship 1 and Championship Cup were televised live by Premier Sports in the 2012 season. Matches were mainly screened on Thursday night with the possibility of a number of double headers. There was one game shown live from the Championship or Championship 1 in each of the regular rounds and at least three play-off games were televised as well as both the Championship and Championship 1 finals. One game from the Championship Cup quarter-finals and semi-finals will be shown live as well as the final.

Premier Sports aired all 201 games of rugby league from the Australian National Rugby League alongside the NRL Footy Show, State of Origin series, NRL Full Time and Rugby League Back Chat until 2017. In January 2011, Premier Sports agreed a deal for live coverage of five games from the Student Rugby League's Super 8 competition on a free-to-view basis. The channel also covers the State of Origin series.

In July 2012, Premier Sports broadcast the Anglo-French Challenge matches between Leigh Centurions and Avignon XIII and Featherstone Rovers and Pia XIII, the later was broadcast free-to-air.

=== Rugby Union ===
On 17 August 2012, Premier Sports announced it had the rights to the French Top 14 league, usually broadcasting two live games per round. These rights transferred to BT Sport for the 2013–14 season.
