= 2017–18 Everton F.C. season =

English football club season

Everton
2017–18 season
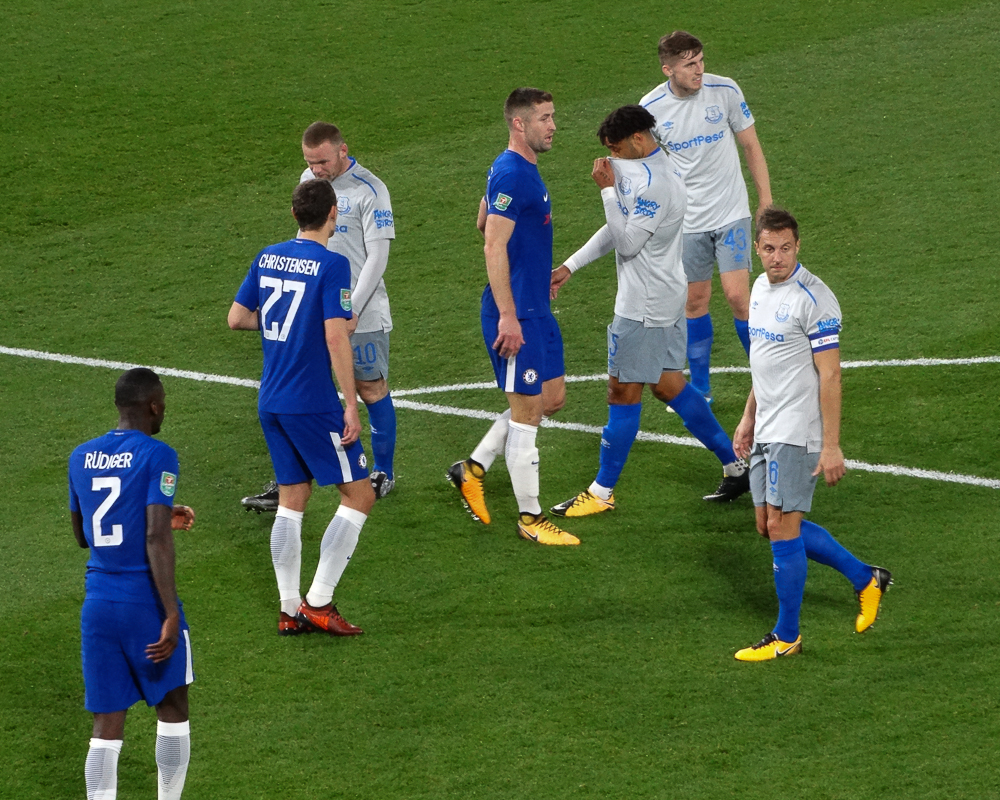
- Everton playing Chelsea at Stamford Bridge
- Chairman: Bill Kenwright
- Manager: Ronald Koeman (until 23 October 2017); David Unsworth (caretaker, from 24 October to 29 November 2017); Sam Allardyce (from 30 November 2017)
- Stadium: Goodison Park
- Premier League: 8th
- FA Cup: Third Round
- EFL Cup: Fourth Round
- UEFA Europa League: Group stage
- Top goalscorer: League: Wayne Rooney (10); All: Wayne Rooney (11)
Home colours	Away colours	Third colours

The 2017–18 season was Everton's 64th consecutive season in the top flight of English football and their 140th year in existence. They participated in the Premier League, FA Cup, EFL Cup, and UEFA Europa League.

Everton had a disappointing start to the campaign, leading to the dismissal of manager Ronald Koeman in October after a 5–2 home loss to Arsenal, Koeman was sacked just two months into his second campaign in charge after guiding Everton into the UEFA Europa League in an impressive first season at the club. It was over a month after his departure that Sam Allardyce took over from interim manager David Unsworth, as prime target, Watford manager Marco Silva, was unable to be released from a contract with The Hornets to take over at Goodison Park. The fiasco led to a legal suit after Silva was controversially sacked by Watford after a downturn in results following his failure to secure the Everton job, and when Silva took over at Everton in the 2018–19 season, Everton were forced to pay £4 million in compensation to Watford for what was described as "an unwarranted approach" whilst Silva was still at Watford. Allardyce guided the club to 8th in the league, but could not prevent exits in the Europa League group stage and the FA Cup third round. Allardyce was dismissed at the conclusion of the season, with Everton's fans criticising Allardyce's style of play on a number of occasions; the club stated "The decision is part of a long-term plan".

The season covered the period from 1 July 2017 to 30 June 2018.

== Transfers ==
=== Transfers in ===
Date from	Position	Nationality	Player	From	Fee	Ref.
1 July 2017	CB	(Netherlands)	Nathangelo Markelo	(Netherlands) Volendam	Undisclosed	
1 July 2017	AM	(Netherlands)	Davy Klaassen	(Netherlands) Ajax	£23,600,000	
1 July 2017	LW	(Nigeria)	Henry Onyekuru	(Belgium) Eupen	£6,800,000	
1 July 2017	GK	(England)	Jordan Pickford	Sunderland	£25,000,000	
3 July 2017	CB	(England)	Michael Keane	Burnley	£25,000,000	
3 July 2017	ST	(Spain)	Sandro	(Spain) Málaga	£5,200,000	
5 July 2017	FW	(France)	Boris Mathis	(France) Metz	Free	
7 July 2017	RW	(England)	Josh Bowler	Queens Park Rangers	£1,500,000	
9 July 2017	FW	(England)	Wayne Rooney	Manchester United	Free	
17 July 2017	RB	(Curaçao)	Cuco Martina	Southampton	Free	
27 July 2017	CB	(England)	Lewis Gibson	Newcastle United	Undisclosed	
16 August 2017	AM	(Iceland)	Gylfi Sigurðsson	Swansea City	£40,000,000	
31 August 2017	CM	(England)	Dennis Adeniran	Fulham	Undisclosed	
31 August 2017	AM	(Croatia)	Nikola Vlašić	(Croatia) Hajduk Split	£8,000,000	
5 January 2018	FW	(Turkey)	Cenk Tosun	(Turkey) Beşiktaş	£27,500,000	
17 January 2018	RW	(England)	Theo Walcott	Arsenal	£20,000,000	

=== Transfers out ===
Date from	Position	Nationality	Player	To	Fee	Ref.
1 July 2017	CB	(England)	Jack Bainbridge	Swansea City	Released	(Note: Jack Bainbridge joined Swansea City following his release.)
1 July 2017	CF	(England)	Delial Brewster	Chesterfield	Released	(Note: Delial Brewster joined Chesterfield following his release.)
1 July 2017	CM	(England)	Tom Cleverley	Watford	£8,000,000	
1 July 2017	RW	(Spain)	Gerard Deulofeu	(Spain) Barcelona	£10,600,000	
1 July 2017	RW	(England)	Michael Donohue	Fleetwood Town	Released	(Note: Michael Donohue joined Fleetwood Town following his release.)
1 July 2017	AM	(Republic of Ireland)	Tyrone Duffus	Free agent	Released	
1 July 2017	GK	(England)	Russell Griffiths	(Scotland) Motherwell	Released	(Note: Russell Griffiths joined Motherwell following his release.)
1 July 2017	GK	(England)	Connor Hunt	Free agent	Released	
1 July 2017	CF	(Ivory Coast)	Arouna Koné	(Turkey) Sivasspor	Released	(Note: Arouna Koné joined Sivasspor following his release.)
1 July 2017	CF	(England)	Conor McAleny	Fleetwood Town	Released	(Note: Conor McAleny joined Fleetwood Town following his release.)
1 July 2017	CB	(England)	Josef Yarney	Newcastle United	Released	(Note: Josef Yarney joined Newcastle United following his release.)
1 July 2017	RB	(England)	James Yates	Hull City	Released	(Note: James Yates joined Hull City following his release.)
10 July 2017	CF	(Belgium)	Romelu Lukaku	Manchester United	£75,000,000	
13 July 2017	RW	(Republic of Ireland)	Aiden McGeady	Sunderland	£500,000	
17 July 2017	CF	(Republic of Ireland)	Courtney Duffus	Oldham Athletic	Undisclosed	
15 August 2017	CM	(England)	Gareth Barry	West Bromwich Albion	£1,000,000	
5 January 2018	AM	(England)	Ross Barkley	Chelsea	£15,000,000	
5 January 2018	CM	(England)	Liam Walsh	Bristol City	Undisclosed	
23 January 2018	RW	(England)	Aaron Lennon	Burnley	Undisclosed	

=== Loans in ===
Start date	Position	Nationality	Player	From	End date	Ref.
7 July 2017	LM	(Germany)	Anton Donkor	(Germany) VfL Wolfsburg	2 January 2018	
31 January 2018	CB	(France)	Eliaquim Mangala	Manchester City	30 June 2018	

=== Loans out ===
Start date	Position	Nationality	Player	To	End date	Ref.
1 July 2017	LW	(Nigeria)	Henry Onyekuru	(Belgium) Anderlecht	30 June 2018	
5 July 2017	CB	(England)	Brendan Galloway	Sunderland	30 June 2018	
8 July 2017	RB	(England)	Tyias Browning	Sunderland	30 June 2018	
19 July 2017	CB	(England)	Matthew Pennington	Leeds United	30 June 2018	
20 July 2017	CM	(England)	Joe Williams	Barnsley	30 June 2018	
3 August 2017	RM	(England)	Kieran Dowell	Nottingham Forest	30 June 2018	
4 August 2017	LB	(United States)	Antonee Robinson	Bolton Wanderers	January 2018; extended to June 2018	
30 August 2017	CM	(England)	Conor Grant	Crewe Alexandra	January 2018	
31 August 2017	CB	(England)	Callum Connolly	Ipswich Town	30 June 2018	
31 August 2017	CM	(England)	Liam Walsh	Birmingham City	January 2018	
7 January 2018	LW	(Belgium)	Kevin Mirallas	(Greece) Olympiacos	30 June 2018	
31 January 2018	RW	(England)	Ademola Lookman	(Germany) RB Leipzig	30 June 2018	
31 January 2018	CM	(Bosnia and Herzegovina)	Muhamed Bešić	Middlesbrough	30 June 2018	
31 January 2018	CF	(Spain)	Sandro	(Spain) Sevilla	30 June 2018	

=== Overall transfer activity ===
==== Spending ====
Summer: ▼£133,100,000

Winter: ▼£27,000,000

Total: ▼£160,100,000

==== Income ====
Summer: ▲£95,100,000

Winter: ▲£15,000,000

Total: ▲£110,100,000

==== Expenditure ====
Summer: ▼£38,000,000

Winter: ▼£12,000,000

Total: ▼£50,000,000

== Pre-season ==
=== Friendlies ===
On 22 June 2017, Everton announced four pre-season friendlies against Sevilla, Gor Mahia, FC Twente and Genk.

13 July 2017	Gor Mahia (Kenya)	1–2	(England) Everton	Mzizima, Tanzania
17:00 EAT	Kagere 37'	Report	Rooney 35'; Dowell 82'	Stadium: Tanzania National Main Stadium

19 July 2017	FC Twente (Netherlands)	0–3	(England) Everton	De Lutte, Netherlands
19:00 CEST		Report	Mirallas 44'; Lennon 73'; Dowell 81'	Stadium: De Stockakker

22 July 2017	Genk (Belgium)	1–1	(England) Everton	Genk, Belgium
16:00 CEST	Samatta 55'	Report	Rooney 45'	Stadium: Luminus Arena

6 August 2017	Everton (England)	2–2	(Spain) Sevilla	Liverpool
15:00 BST	Sandro 1'; Mirallas 81' (pen.)	Report	Banega 58', 60' (pen.)	Stadium: Goodison Park

== Competitions ==
=== Premier League ===
==== League table ====
Pos	Team	Pld	W	D	L	GF	GA	GD	Pts	Qualification or relegation
6	Arsenal	38	19	6	13	74	51	+23	63	Qualification for the Europa League group stage (Note: Since the winners of the 2017–18 FA Cup (Chelsea) and the winners of the 2017–18 EFL Cup (Manchester City) both qualified for European competition based on their league positions, the berths awarded to the 5th-placed team (Europa League group stage) and the League Cup winners (Europa League second qualifying round) were passed down the league.)
7	Burnley	38	14	12	12	36	39	−3	54	Qualification for the Europa League second qualifying round
8	Everton	38	13	10	15	44	58	−14	49	
9	Leicester City	38	12	11	15	56	60	−4	47	
10	Newcastle United	38	12	8	18	39	47	−8	44	

Source: Premier League
Rules for classification: 1) Points; 2) Goal difference; 3) Goals scored. 4) Play-offs (only if needed to decide champion, teams for relegation or teams for UEFA competitions).

==== Result summary ====
Overall								Home						Away					
Pld	W	D	L	GF	GA	GD	Pts	W	D	L	GF	GA	GD	W	D	L	GF	GA	GD
38	13	10	15	44	58	−14	49	10	4	5	28	22	+6	3	6	10	16	36	−20

Source: Premier League

==== Results by matchday ====
Matchday	1	2	3	4	5	6	7	8	9	10	11	12	13	14	15	16	17	18	19	20	21	22	23	24	25	26	27	28	29	30	31	32	33	34	35	36	37	38
Ground	H	A	A	H	A	H	H	A	H	A	H	A	A	H	H	A	A	H	H	A	A	H	A	H	H	A	H	A	A	H	A	H	H	A	H	A	H	A
Result	W	D	L	L	L	W	L	D	L	L	W	D	L	W	W	D	W	W	D	D	L	L	L	D	W	L	W	L	L	W	W	L	D	D	W	W	D	L
Position	7	8	12	16	18	13	16	16	18	18	15	16	16	13	10	10	10	9	9	9	9	9	9	9	9	10	9	9	11	9	9	9	9	9	8	8	8	8

Source: 11v11
A = Away; H = Home; W = Win; D = Draw; L = Loss

==== Matches ====
On 14 June 2017, Everton's Premier League fixtures were announced.

12 August 2017 1	Everton	1–0	Stoke City	Liverpool
15:00 BST	Rooney 45+1'; Martina (yellow card) 85'	Report	Allen (yellow card) 29'	Stadium: Goodison Park; Attendance: 39,045; Referee: Neil Swarbrick

21 August 2017 2	Manchester City	1–1	Everton	Manchester
20:00 BST	Walker (yellow card) 42' (yellow-red card) 44'; Kompany (yellow card) 77'; Sterling 82'	Report	Schneiderlin (yellow card) 7' (yellow-red card) 88'; Davies (yellow card) 25'; Rooney 35', (yellow card) 84'	Stadium: City of Manchester Stadium; Attendance: 49,108; Referee: Bobby Madley

27 August 2017 3	Chelsea	2–0	Everton	Fulham, London
13:30 BST	Fàbregas 27'; Morata 40'; Moses (yellow card) 76'; Azpilicueta (yellow card) 88'	Report	Gueye (yellow card) 9'; Rooney (yellow card) 71'	Stadium: Stamford Bridge; Attendance: 41,382; Referee: Jonathan Moss

9 September 2017 4	Everton	0–3	Tottenham Hotspur	Liverpool
15:00 BST	Williams (yellow card) 5'; Gueye (yellow card) 57'; Rooney (yellow card) 88'	Report	Alderweireld (yellow card) 13'; Kane 28', 46'; Eriksen 42'	Stadium: Goodison Park; Attendance: 38,835; Referee: Graham Scott

17 September 2017 5	Manchester United	4–0	Everton	Manchester
16:00 BST	Valencia 4'; Bailly (yellow card) 82'; Mkhitaryan 84'; Lukaku 89'; Martial 90+2' (pen.)	Report	Williams (yellow card) 63'	Stadium: Old Trafford; Attendance: 75,042; Referee: Andre Marriner

23 September 2017 6	Everton	2–1	Bournemouth	Liverpool
15:00 BST	Schneiderlin (yellow card) 15'; Davies (yellow card) 56'; Niasse 77', 82', (yellow card) 80'	Report	King 49'; Stanislas (yellow card) 90+6'	Stadium: Goodison Park; Attendance: 38,133; Referee: Martin Atkinson

1 October 2017 7	Everton	0–1	Burnley	Liverpool
14:15 BST	Calvert-Lewin (yellow card) 49'; Baines (yellow card) 58'	Report	Hendrick 21'; Defour (yellow card) 40'; Arfield (yellow card) 42'	Stadium: Goodison Park; Attendance: 38,448; Referee: Jonathan Moss

15 October 2017 8	Brighton & Hove Albion	1–1	Everton	Brighton
13:30 BST	Pröpper (yellow card) 56'; Dunk (yellow card) 67'; Knockaert 82', (yellow card) 89'; Bruno (yellow card) 88'	Report	Rooney 90' (pen.); Mirallas (yellow card) 90+3'	Stadium: Falmer Stadium; Attendance: 30,565; Referee: Michael Oliver

22 October 2017 9	Everton	2–5	Arsenal	Liverpool
13:30 BST	Rooney 12'; Williams (yellow card) 16'; Gueye (yellow card) 34' (yellow-red card) 68'; Niasse 90+3'	Report	Monreal 40'; Özil 53'; Lacazette 74'; Koscielny (yellow card) 86'; Ramsey 90'; Sánchez 90+5'	Stadium: Goodison Park; Attendance: 39,189; Referee: Craig Pawson

29 October 2017 10	Leicester City	2–0	Everton	Leicester
16:00 GMT	Vardy 18'; Gray 29'	Report	Davies (yellow card) 20'; Gueye (yellow card) 65'	Stadium: King Power Stadium; Attendance: 31,891; Referee: Andre Marriner

5 November 2017 11	Everton	3–2	Watford	Liverpool
16:30 GMT	Niasse 67'; Calvert-Lewin 74'; Baines 90+1' (pen.)	Report	Richarlison 46'; Kabasele 64'; Britos (yellow card) 69'; Holebas (yellow card) 90'; Cleverley (penalty missed) 90+11'	Stadium: Goodison Park; Attendance: 38,609; Referee: Graham Scott

18 November 2017 12	Crystal Palace	2–2	Everton	London
15:00 GMT	McArthur 1'; Milivojević (yellow card) 32'; Zaha 35'; Sakho (yellow card) 61'	Report	Baines 6' (pen.); Niasse (yellow card) 36', (goal) 45+1'; Keane (yellow card) 44'; Davies (yellow card) 63'	Stadium: Selhurst Park; Attendance: 25,526; Referee: Anthony Taylor

26 November 2017 13	Southampton	4–1	Everton	Southampton
13:30 GMT	Tadić 18'; Austin 52', 58'; Davis 87'	Report	Sigurðsson 45'	Stadium: St. Mary's Stadium; Attendance: 30,461; Referee: Kevin Friend

29 November 2017 14	Everton	4–0	West Ham United	Liverpool
20:00 GMT	Rooney (penalty missed) 18', 18', 28', 66'; Sigurðsson (yellow card) 35'; Davies (yellow card) 53'; Williams 78'	Report	Zabaleta (yellow card) 26'; Lanzini (penalty missed) 59'	Stadium: Goodison Park; Attendance: 38,242; Referee: Michael Oliver

2 December 2017 15	Everton	2–0	Huddersfield Town	Liverpool
15:00 GMT	Kenny (yellow card) 23'; Davies (yellow card) 24'; Sigurðsson 47'; Calvert-Lewin 73'	Report	Malone (yellow card) 22'	Stadium: Goodison Park; Attendance: 39,167; Referee: Chris Kavanagh

10 December 2017 16	Liverpool	1–1	Everton	Liverpool
14:15 GMT	Salah 42'; Lovren (yellow card) 76'	Report	Sigurðsson (yellow card) 36'; Gueye (yellow card) 42'; Rooney 77' (pen.); Schneiderlin (yellow card) 85'	Stadium: Anfield; Attendance: 53,082; Referee: Craig Pawson

13 December 2017 17	Newcastle United	0–1	Everton	Newcastle
19:45 GMT	Shelvey (yellow card) 42' (yellow-red card) 90+4'; Merino (yellow card) 56'	Report	Rooney 27'; Holgate (yellow card) 48'; Calvert-Lewin (yellow card) 90+3'	Stadium: St James' Park; Attendance: 51,042; Referee: Martin Atkinson

18 December 2017 18	Everton	3–1	Swansea City	Liverpool
20:00 GMT	Holgate (yellow card) 29'; Rooney (penalty missed) 45+2', 73' (pen.); Calvert-Lewin 45+2'; Sigurðsson 64'; Kenny (yellow card) 83'	Report	Fer 35', (yellow card) 84'; Dyer (yellow card) 37'; Fernández (yellow card) 52'	Stadium: Goodison Park; Attendance: 37,580; Referee: Jonathan Moss

23 December 2017 19	Everton	0–0	Chelsea	Liverpool
12:30 GMT	Calvert-Lewin (yellow card) 10'; Martina (yellow card) 21'; Keane (yellow card) 57'	Report		Stadium: Goodison Park; Attendance: 39,191; Referee: Bobby Madley

26 December 2017 20	West Bromwich Albion	0–0	Everton	West Bromwich
15:00 GMT	Dawson (yellow card) 68'; Barry (yellow card) 79'	Report		Stadium: The Hawthorns; Attendance: 25,364; Referee: Roger East

30 December 2017 21	Bournemouth	2–1	Everton	Bournemouth
15:00 GMT	Fraser 33', 88'	Report	Gueye 57'	Stadium: Vitality Stadium; Attendance: 10,497; Referee: Lee Probert

1 January 2018 22	Everton	0–2	Manchester United	Liverpool
17:30 GMT	Rooney (yellow card) 43'; Holgate (yellow card) 83'	Report	Martial 57'; Lingard 81'	Stadium: Goodison Park; Attendance: 39,188; Referee: Andre Marriner

13 January 2018 23	Tottenham Hotspur	4–0	Everton	London
17:30 GMT	Son 26'; Kane 47', 59'; Eriksen 81'	Report	Jagielka (yellow card) 45'; Rooney (yellow card) 75'	Stadium: Wembley Stadium; Attendance: 76,251; Referee: Craig Pawson

20 January 2018 24	Everton	1–1	West Bromwich Albion	Liverpool
15:00 GMT	Walcott (yellow card) 45+1'; Schneiderlin (yellow card) 58'; Niasse 70'	Report	Rodriguez 7'; Dawson (yellow card) 88'	Stadium: Goodison Park; Attendance: 39,061; Referee: Stuart Attwell

31 January 2018 25	Everton	2–1	Leicester City	Liverpool
19:45 GMT	Walcott 25', 39'	Report	Vardy 71' (pen.); Albrighton (yellow card) 90'; Ndidi (yellow card) 90+1'	Stadium: Goodison Park; Attendance: 38,390; Referee: Chris Kavanagh

3 February 2018 26	Arsenal	5–1	Everton	Holloway, London
17:30 GMT	Ramsey 6', 19', 74'; Koscielny 14', (yellow card) 24'; Aubameyang 37'; Mustafi (yellow card) 50'	Report	Calvert-Lewin 64'	Stadium: Emirates Stadium; Attendance: 59,306; Referee: Neil Swarbrick

10 February 2018 27	Everton	3–1	Crystal Palace	Liverpool
15:00 GMT	Sigurðsson 46'; Niasse 51'; Walcott (yellow card) 68'; Davies 75'	Report	Van Aanholt (yellow card) 54'; Milivojević 83' (pen.)	Stadium: Goodison Park; Attendance: 39,139; Referee: Jonathan Moss

24 February 2018 28	Watford	1–0	Everton	Watford
17:30 GMT	Capoue (yellow card) 53'; Deeney 79'; Janmaat (yellow card) 88'; Carrillo (yellow card) 90+2'	Report	Gueye (yellow card) 64'	Stadium: Vicarage Road; Attendance: 20,430; Referee: Anthony Taylor

3 March 2018 29	Burnley	2–1	Everton	Burnley
12:30 GMT	Westwood (yellow card) 36'; Barnes 56'; Wood 80'	Report	Tosun 20'; Calvert-Lewin (yellow card) 26'; Williams (red card) 86'	Stadium: Turf Moor; Attendance: 20,802; Referee: Chris Kavanagh

10 March 2018 30	Everton	2–0	Brighton & Hove Albion	Liverpool
15:00 GMT	Bong 60' (o.g.); Tosun 76'	Report	Schelotto (yellow card) 55'; Knockaert (red card) 80'	Stadium: Goodison Park; Attendance: 39,199; Referee: Roger East

17 March 2018 31	Stoke City	1–2	Everton	Stoke-on-Trent
15:00 GMT	Adam (red card) 30'; Shawcross (yellow card) 55'; Choupo-Moting 77'	Report	Tosun 69', 84'; Jagielka (yellow card) 82'	Stadium: Bet365 Stadium; Attendance: 30,022; Referee: Martin Atkinson

31 March 2018 31	Everton	1–3	Manchester City	Liverpool
17:30 BST	Bolasie 63'	Report	Sané 4'; Gabriel Jesus 12'; Sterling 37'	Stadium: Goodison Park; Attendance: 39,221; Referee: Paul Tierney

7 April 2018 33	Everton	0–0	Liverpool	Liverpool
12:30 BST		Report		Stadium: Goodison Park; Attendance: 39,220; Referee: Michael Oliver

14 April 2018 34	Swansea City	1–1	Everton	Swansea
15:00 BST	J. Ayew (yellow card) 55', (goal) 71'	Report	Naughton 43' (o.g.); Baningime (yellow card) 90+3'	Stadium: Liberty Stadium; Attendance: 20,933; Referee: Lee Mason

23 April 2018 35	Everton	1–0	Newcastle United	Liverpool
20:00 BST	Walcott 51'; Keane (yellow card) 75'; Gueye (yellow card) 90+1'	Report	Kenedy (yellow card) 90+1'	Stadium: Goodison Park; Attendance: 39,061; Referee: Bobby Madley

28 April 2018 36	Huddersfield Town	0–2	Everton	Huddersfield
15:00 BST	Hogg (yellow card) 50'	Report	Tosun 39'; Gueye 77'	Stadium: John Smith's Stadium; Attendance: 24,121; Referee: Lee Probert

5 May 2018 37	Everton	1–1	Southampton	Liverpool
17:30 BST	Schneiderlin (yellow card) 77'; Davies 90+6', (yellow card) 90+6'	Report	Austin (yellow card) 45'; Romeu (yellow card) 53'; Redmond 56'; Yoshida (yellow card) 71' (yellow-red card) 85'; Hoedt (yellow card) 90+3'; Long (yellow card) 90+7'	Stadium: Goodison Park; Attendance: 38,225; Referee: Jonathan Moss

13 May 2018 38	West Ham United	3–1	Everton	Stratford, London
15:00 BST	Lanzini 39', 82'; Arnautović 63'	Report	Funes Mori (yellow card) 16'; Niasse 74'	Stadium: London Stadium; Attendance: 56,926; Referee: Graham Scott

=== FA Cup ===
In the FA Cup, Everton entered the competition in the third round and were drawn away to Liverpool.

5 January 2018 Third round	Liverpool	2–1	Everton	Liverpool
19:55 GMT	Milner 35' (pen.); Van Dijk 84'; Solanke (yellow card) 88'	Report	Rooney (yellow card) 7'; McCarthy (yellow card) 60'; Sigurðsson 67'	Stadium: Anfield; Attendance: 52,513; Referee: Bobby Madley

=== EFL Cup ===
Everton joined the competition in third round and were drawn at home to Sunderland. An away trip to Chelsea was announced for the fourth round.

20 September 2017 Third round	Everton	3–0	Sunderland	Liverpool
19:45 BST	Calvert-Lewin 39', 52'; Niasse 83'	Report	Gibson (yellow card) 51'	Stadium: Goodison Park; Attendance: 23,000; Referee: Oliver Langford

25 October 2017 Fourth round	Chelsea	2–1	Everton	Fulham
19:45 BST	Rüdiger 26', (yellow card) 66'; Willian 90+2'	Report	Williams (yellow card) 28'; Davies (yellow card) 50'; McCarthy (yellow card) 52'; Jagielka (yellow card) 61'; Calvert-Lewin 90+3'	Stadium: Stamford Bridge; Attendance: 40,655; Referee: Neil Swarbrick

=== UEFA Europa League ===
==== Qualifying ====
Everton entered the competition in the third qualifying round, where they faced Slovak side Ružomberok. After winning the tie 2–0 on aggregate they were drawn against Croatian team Hajduk Split in the play-off round.

27 July 2017 3rd qualifying round L1	Everton (England)	1–0	(Slovakia) Ružomberok	Liverpool, England
20:05 BST	Baines 65'	Report	Kupec (yellow card) 54'; Haskić (yellow card) 79'	Stadium: Goodison Park; Attendance: 32,124; Referee: Georgi Kabakov (Bulgaria)

3 August 2017 3rd qualifying round L2	Ružomberok (Slovakia)	0–1 (0–2 agg.)	(England) Everton	Ružomberok, Slovakia
20:45 CEST		Report	Calvert-Lewin 80'	Stadium: Štadión pod Čebraťom; Attendance: 4,752; Referee: Michael Tykgaard (Denmark)

17 August 2017 Play-off round L1	Everton (England)	2–0	(Croatia) Hajduk Split	Liverpool, England
20:05 BST	Schneiderlin (yellow card) 19'; Keane 30'; Gueye 45'; Bešić (yellow card) 90+1'	Report	Memolla (yellow card) 43'	Stadium: Goodison Park; Attendance: 34,977; Referee: Ivan Kružliak (Slovakia)

24 August 2017 Play-off round L2	Hajduk Split (Croatia)	1–1 (1–3 agg.)	(England) Everton	Split, Croatia
21:00 CEST	Radošević 43', (yellow card) 74'; Erceg (yellow card) 90'	Report	Sigurðsson 46'; Bešić (yellow card) 72'	Stadium: Stadion Poljud; Attendance: 31,645; Referee: Sergei Karasev (Russia)

==== Group stage ====
On 25 August 2017, Everton were drawn into Group E alongside Lyon, Atalanta and Apollon Limassol.

Pos	Team	Pld	W	D	L	GF	GA	GD	Pts	Qualification	ATA	LYO	EVE	APL
1	(Italy) Atalanta	6	4	2	0	14	4	+10	14	Advance to knockout phase	—	1–0	3–0	3–1
2	(France) Lyon	6	3	2	1	11	4	+7	11	Advance to knockout phase	1–1	—	3–0	4–0
3	(England) Everton	6	1	1	4	7	15	−8	4		1–5	1–2	—	2–2
4	(Cyprus) Apollon Limassol	6	0	3	3	5	14	−9	3		1–1	1–1	0–3	—

Source: UEFA
Rules for classification: Group stage tiebreakers

14 September 2017 1	Atalanta (Italy)	3–0	(England) Everton	Reggio Emilia, Italy
19:00 CET	Masiello 27', (yellow card) 33'; Gómez 41'; Cristante 44'	Report	Sigurðsson (yellow card) 63'	Stadium: Mapei Stadium – Città del Tricolore; Attendance: 14,490; Referee: Vladislav Bezborodov (Russia)

28 September 2017 2	Everton (England)	2–2	(Cyprus) Apollon Limassol	Liverpool, England
21:05 CET	Rooney 21'; Vlašić 66'	Report	Sardinero 12'; Yuste (yellow card) 74', (goal) 88'; Roberge (red card) 86'	Stadium: Goodison Park; Attendance: 27,034; Referee: Tamás Bognár (Hungary)

19 October 2017 3	Everton (England)	1–2	(France) Lyon	Liverpool, England
21:05 CET	Lookman (yellow card) 55'; Williams (yellow card) 65', (goal) 69'	Report	Fekir 6' (pen.); Traoré (yellow card) 65', (goal) 75'	Stadium: Goodison Park; Attendance: 27,159; Referee: Bas Nijhuis (Netherlands)

2 November 2017 4	Lyon (France)	3–0	(England) Everton	Lyon, France
19:00 CET	Traoré 68'; Aouar 76', (yellow card) 85'; Rafael (yellow card) 78'; Depay 88'	Report	Martina (yellow card) 7'; Schneiderlin (yellow card) 57' (yellow-red card) 80'; Vlašić (yellow card) 90+2'	Stadium: Groupama Stadium; Attendance: 48,103; Referee: Orel Grinfeld (Israel)

23 November 2017 5	Everton (England)	1–5	(Italy) Atalanta	Liverpool, England
21:05 CET	Williams (yellow card) 43'; Martina (yellow card) 67'; Sandro 71'; Davies (yellow card) 76'; Calvert-Lewin (yellow card) 90+3'	Report	Cristante 12', 64'; Gómez (penalty missed) 48'; Gosens 86'; Cornelius 88', 90+4'	Stadium: Goodison Park; Attendance: 17,431; Referee: Jakob Kehlet (Denmark)

7 December 2017 6	Apollon Limassol (Cyprus)	0–3	(England) Everton	Limassol, Cyprus
19:00 CET	Sachetti (yellow card) 78'	Report	Lookman 21', 27'; Baningime (yellow card) 73'; Vlašić 87'	Stadium: Tsirion Stadium; Attendance: 4,237; Referee: Sébastien Delferière (Belgium)

== Players ==
=== First team squad ===
As of 31 January 2018

Note: Flags indicate national team as defined under FIFA eligibility rules; some limited exceptions apply. Players may hold more than one non-FIFA nationality.

No.	Pos.	Nation	Player
1	GK	ENG	Jordan Pickford
2	MF	FRA	Morgan Schneiderlin
3	DF	ENG	Leighton Baines
4	DF	ENG	Michael Keane
5	DF	WAL	Ashley Williams
6	DF	ENG	Phil Jagielka (captain)
7	FW	COD	Yannick Bolasie
10	FW	ENG	Wayne Rooney
11	MF	ENG	Theo Walcott
13	DF	FRA	Eliaquim Mangala
14	FW	TUR	Cenk Tosun
15	DF	CUW	Cuco Martina
16	MF	IRL	James McCarthy
17	MF	SEN	Idrissa Gueye

No.	Pos.	Nation	Player
18	MF	ISL	Gylfi Sigurðsson
19	FW	SEN	Oumar Niasse
20	MF	NED	Davy Klaassen
22	GK	NED	Maarten Stekelenburg
23	DF	IRL	Séamus Coleman
25	DF	ARG	Ramiro Funes Mori
26	MF	ENG	Tom Davies
27	FW	CRO	Nikola Vlašić
29	FW	ENG	Dominic Calvert-Lewin
30	DF	ENG	Mason Holgate
33	GK	ESP	Joel Robles
43	DF	ENG	Jonjoe Kenny
54	MF	ENG	Beni Baningime

=== Out on loan ===
Note: Flags indicate national team as defined under FIFA eligibility rules; some limited exceptions apply. Players may hold more than one non-FIFA nationality.

No.	Pos.	Nation	Player
9	FW	ESP	Sandro (at Sevilla until June 2018)
11	FW	BEL	Kevin Mirallas (at Olympiacos until June 2018)
21	MF	BIH	Muhamed Bešić (at Middlesbrough until June 2018)
28	MF	ENG	Kieran Dowell (at Nottingham Forest until June 2018)
31	FW	ENG	Ademola Lookman (at RB Leipzig until June 2018)
35	DF	ENG	Callum Connolly (at Ipswich Town until June 2018)

No.	Pos.	Nation	Player
46	MF	ENG	Joe Williams (at Barnsley until June 2018)
—	DF	USA	Antonee Robinson (at Bolton Wanderers until June 2018)
—	DF	ENG	Brendan Galloway (at Sunderland until June 2018)
—	DF	ENG	Matthew Pennington (at Leeds United until June 2018)
—	DF	ENG	Tyias Browning (at Sunderland until June 2018)
—	FW	NGR	Henry Onyekuru (at Anderlecht until June 2018)

== Squad statistics ==
=== Appearances ===
No.	Pos	Nat	Player	Total		Premier League		FA Cup		League Cup		Europe	
No.	Pos	Nat	Player	Apps	Goals	Apps	Goals	Apps	Goals	Apps	Goals	Apps	Goals
1	GK	(England) ENG	Jordan Pickford	46	0	38	0	1	0	1	0	6	0
2	MF	(France) FRA	Morgan Schneiderlin	40	0	24+6	0	1	0	0	0	9	0
3	DF	(England) ENG	Leighton Baines	29	3	22	2	0	0	1	0	6	1
4	DF	(England) ENG	Michael Keane	38	1	29+1	0	0	0	1	0	7	1
5	DF	(Wales) WAL	Ashley Williams	34	2	20+4	1	0	0	2	0	8	1
6	DF	(England) ENG	Phil Jagielka	29	0	23+2	0	1	0	1	0	2	0
7	MF	(Democratic Republic of the Congo) COD	Yannick Bolasie	17	1	12+4	1	1	0	0	0	0	0
10	FW	(England) ENG	Wayne Rooney	40	11	27+4	10	1	0	1	0	7	1
11	MF	(England) ENG	Theo Walcott	15	3	15	3	0	0	0	0	0	0
13	DF	(France) FRA	Eliaquim Mangala	2	0	2	0	0	0	0	0	0	0
14	FW	(Turkey) TUR	Cenk Tosun	14	5	12+2	5	0	0	0	0	0	0
15	DF	(Curaçao) CUW	Cuco Martina	28	0	20+1	0	1	0	0	0	6	0
16	MF	(Republic of Ireland) IRL	James McCarthy	6	0	3+1	0	1	0	1	0	0	0
17	MF	(Senegal) SEN	Idrissa Gueye	37	3	32	2	0	0	0	0	5	1
18	MF	(Iceland) ISL	Gylfi Sigurðsson	33	6	25+2	4	1	1	0	0	4+1	1
19	FW	(Senegal) SEN	Oumar Niasse	24	9	9+12	8	0+1	0	0+2	1	0	0
20	MF	(Netherlands) NED	Davy Klaassen	17	0	4+3	0	0	0	1	0	7+2	0
22	GK	(Netherlands) NED	Maarten Stekelenburg	3	0	0	0	0	0	1	0	2	0
23	DF	(Republic of Ireland) IRL	Séamus Coleman	11	0	11	0	0	0	0	0	0	0
25	DF	(Argentina) ARG	Ramiro Funes Mori	4	0	1+3	0	0	0	0	0	0	0
26	MF	(England) ENG	Tom Davies	43	2	20+13	2	0+1	0	2	0	4+3	0
27	MF	(Croatia) CRO	Nikola Vlašić	18	2	6+5	0	0	0	1	0	3+3	2
29	FW	(England) ENG	Dominic Calvert-Lewin	44	8	18+14	4	1	0	1+1	3	4+5	1
30	DF	(England) ENG	Mason Holgate	21	0	13+2	0	1	0	1	0	4	0
33	GK	(Spain) ESP	Joel Robles	2	0	0	0	0	0	0	0	2	0
37	MF	(Republic of Ireland) IRL	Harry Charsley	1	0	0	0	0	0	0	0	1	0
43	DF	(England) ENG	Jonjoe Kenny	25	0	17+2	0	1	0	2	0	3	0
48	DF	(England) ENG	Morgan Feeney	2	0	0	0	0	0	0	0	1+1	0
54	MF	(England) ENG	Beni Baningime	11	0	1+6	0	0	0	1	0	3	0
55	MF	(Wales) WAL	Nathan Broadhead	1	0	0	0	0	0	0	0	0+1	0
61	MF	(England) ENG	Alex Denny	1	0	0	0	0	0	0	0	0+1	0
67	MF	(Scotland) SCO	Fraser Hornby	1	0	0	0	0	0	0	0	1	0
70	FW	(England) ENG	Anthony Gordon	1	0	0	0	0	0	0	0	0+1	0
Players loaned out during season
9	FW	(Spain) ESP	Sandro	15	1	3+5	0	0	0	1	0	3+3	1
11	FW	(Belgium) BEL	Kevin Mirallas	13	0	2+3	0	0	0	1	0	5+2	0
21	MF	(Bosnia and Herzegovina) BIH	Muhamed Bešić	8	0	0+2	0	0	0	1	0	3+2	0
31	FW	(England) ENG	Ademola Lookman	16	2	1+6	0	0+1	0	1+1	0	4+2	2
Players who left during the season
8	MF	(England) ENG	Ross Barkley	0	0	0	0	0	0	0	0	0	0
12	MF	(England) ENG	Aaron Lennon	20	0	10+6	0	0	0	1+1	0	1+1	0
18	MF	(England) ENG	Gareth Barry	1	0	0	0	0	0	0	0	0+1	0

=== Goalscorers ===
Rank	Pos.	No.	Player	Premier League	Europa League	FA Cup	League Cup	Total
1	FW	10	(England) Wayne Rooney	10	1	0	0	11
2	FW	19	(Senegal) Oumar Niasse	8	0	0	1	9
3	FW	29	(England) Dominic Calvert-Lewin	4	1	0	3	8
4	MF	18	(Iceland) Gylfi Sigurðsson	4	1	1	0	6
5	FW	14	(Turkey) Cenk Tosun	5	0	0	0	5
6	DF	3	(England) Leighton Baines	2	1	0	0	3
6	FW	11	(England) Theo Walcott	3	0	0	0	3
6	MF	17	(Senegal) Idrissa Gueye	2	1	0	0	3
9	DF	5	(Wales) Ashley Williams	1	1	0	0	2
9	MF	26	(England) Tom Davies	2	0	0	0	2
9	MF	27	(Croatia) Nikola Vlašić	0	2	0	0	2
9	FW	31	(England) Ademola Lookman	0	2	0	0	2
13	DF	4	(England) Michael Keane	0	1	0	0	1
13	MF	7	(Democratic Republic of the Congo) Yannick Bolasie	1	0	0	0	1
13	FW	9	(Spain) Sandro	0	1	0	0	1
Own goals				2	0	0	0	2
Total				44	12	1	4	61

Source: Match reports in Competitions

=== Disciplinary record ===
As of 10 February 2018

Rank	Position	Name	Premier League		FA Cup		EFL Cup		Europa League		Total	
Rank	Position	Name	Booked	Sent off (straight red)	Booked	Sent off (straight red)	Booked	Sent off (straight red)	Booked	Sent off (straight red)	Booked	Sent off (straight red)
1	MF	(England) Tom Davies	6	0	0	0	1	0	1	0	8	0
1	MF	(France) Morgan Schneiderlin	4	1	0	0	0	0	2	1	6	2
3	DF	(Wales) Ashley Williams	3	0	0	0	1	0	2	0	6	0
3	MF	(England) Wayne Rooney	5	0	1	0	0	0	0	0	6	0
5	MF	(Senegal) Idrissa Gueye	4	1	0	0	0	0	0	0	4	1
6	FW	(England) Dominic Calvert-Lewin	3	0	0	0	0	0	1	0	4	0
7	MF	(Iceland) Gylfi Sigurðsson	2	0	0	0	0	0	1	0	3	0
7	DF	(England) Mason Holgate	3	0	0	0	0	0	0	0	3	0
7	DF	(Curaçao) Cuco Martina	1	0	0	0	0	0	2	0	3	0
10	FW	(Senegal) Oumar Niasse	2	0	0	0	0	0	0	0	2	0
10	DF	(England) Phil Jagielka	1	0	0	0	1	0	0	0	2	0
10	MF	(Bosnia and Herzegovina) Muhamed Bešić	0	0	0	0	0	0	2	0	2	0
10	MF	(England) Theo Walcott	2	0	0	0	0	0	0	0	2	0
10	DF	(England) Jonjoe Kenny	2	0	0	0	0	0	0	0	2	0
10	DF	(England) Michael Keane	2	0	0	0	0	0	0	0	2	0
10	MF	(Republic of Ireland) James McCarthy	0	0	1	0	1	0	0	0	2	0
17	DF	(England) Leighton Baines	1	0	0	0	0	0	0	0	1	0
17	MF	(Belgium) Kevin Mirallas	1	0	0	0	0	0	0	0	1	0
17	FW	(England) Ademola Lookman	0	0	0	0	0	0	1	0	1	0
17	MF	(Croatia) Nikola Vlašić	0	0	0	0	0	0	1	0	1	0
17	MF	(England) Beni Baningime	0	0	0	0	0	0	1	0	1	0
Total			42	2	2	0	4	0	14	1	62	3

Source: Match reports in Competitions
