= Aaron McEneff =

Irish footballer (born 1995)

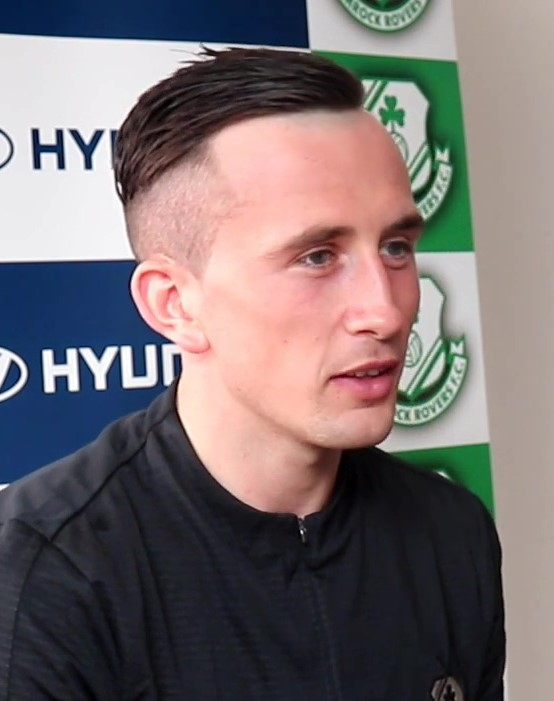
- McEneff in 2019

Personal information
- Date of birth: 9 July 1995 (age 31)
- Place of birth: Derry, Northern Ireland
- Position: Midfielder

Team information
- Current team: Glentoran
- Number: 8

Youth career
- Don Boscos
- Maiden City
- 2011–2013: Institute
- 2013–2015: Tottenham Hotspur

Senior career*
Years	Team	Apps	(Gls)
2015–2018	Derry City	102	(25)
2019–2020	Shamrock Rovers	44	(12)
2021–2022	Heart of Midlothian	27	(3)
2022–2024	Perth Glory	15	(3)
2024	→ Shamrock Rovers (loan)	12	(0)
2025–2026	Shamrock Rovers	24	(3)
2026–	Glentoran	18	(6)

International career^{‡}
2012	Northern Ireland U17	2	(0)
2013–2014	Northern Ireland U19	6	(0)
- * Club domestic league appearances and goals as of 16:47, 22 September 2026 (UTC) ‡ National team caps and goals as of 23:21, 16 November 2020 (UTC)

Aaron McEneff (born 9 July 1995) is an Irish professional footballer who plays as a midfielder for Glentoran in the NIFL Premiership.

McEneff was born in Derry and played youth football with Institute and Tottenham Hotspur before starting his professional career with Derry City.

In November 2020, he was called up to the Republic of Ireland senior squad for the Nations League game against Bulgaria.

== Early life ==
McEneff was born in Derry and grew up in the Cornshell Fields estate in the city. He attended St. Columb's College while playing youth football for Don Boscos and Maiden City Academy. He has two brothers, Nathan and Jordan. Jordan currently plays for Larne.

== Club career ==
=== Early career ===
McEneff began his career at Institute, playing in the NIFL Championship. He had trials with Kilmarnock and Tottenham Hotspur in early 2012 before impressing for the latter in a youth game against Aston Villa and being snapped up on a two-year scholarship deal in May 2012. Tottenham Technical Director at the time, Tim Sherwood, remarked that McEneff reminded him of "a young Roy Keane." His international clearance did not arrive until January 2013 and he was only allowed to begin playing competitive games after this. He progressed well enough to earn a one-year professional deal in summer 2014, although a long-term knee injury that saw him miss four months at the start of the 2014–15 U21 Premier League season stunted his progress. He regained his place in the U21 side, however his contract wasn't renewed and he was released in June 2015.

=== Derry City ===
McEneff went on trial with Nottingham Forest and Sheffield Wednesday before he returned to his hometown club Derry City to sign an 18-month contract under manager Peter Hutton on 30 July 2015. McEneff made his league debut for Derry in a 2–0 home defeat to Dundalk on 14 August 2015. Initially, McEneff found his form was inconsistent as he struggled to mentally deal with the setback of his departure from Tottenham, however his performances improved after a sustained run of games towards the end of 2015. He finished the season with 9 league appearances. He credits moving back to the League of Ireland with helping him to develop as a player and gain experience of playing real football.

After gradually adapting to life at the club, McEneff established himself as a key player for Derry City. 2016 was his first full season in the League of Ireland and he made 29 league appearances scoring six goals. McEneff signed a new two-year contract extension with the club in September 2016. In 2017 he scored 9 goals in 29 league appearances and also appeared in both legs of the Europa League first qualifying round tie against Midtjylland scoring once.

=== Shamrock Rovers ===
In November 2018 McEneff left his hometown and signed for Shamrock Rovers In his first season with Rovers he helped them to a 2nd place finish in the league and was part of the team who defeated Dundalk on penalties to win the FAI Cup final. This was Rovers 25th FAI Cup and the first time the club had lifted the trophy since 1987 In 2020 McEneff was a member of the Shamrock Rovers side who won their 18th League of Ireland title.

=== Heart of Midlothian ===
On transfer deadline day, 1 February 2021, McEneff signed a 2 1/2-year contract with Scottish Championship side Heart of Midlothian. He made his debut on 5 February 2021, coming off the bench for Armand Gnanduillet in a 1–0 win over Ayr United at Somerset Park. He scored his first goal for the Tynecastle club on 9 April 2021 against Alloa in a 6–0 victory that took the club to within two points of the second tier title. McEneff scored in a 3–0 win over Inverness Caledonian Thistle, a game which his side were awarded the 2020–21 Scottish Championship trophy. He scored his first goal of the 2021–22 season in a 3–2 defeat to Celtic in a Scottish League Cup tie at Celtic Park, beating Joe Hart at his near post in the 92nd minute. His first Scottish Premiership goal came on 6 November 2021, in a 5–2 win over Dundee United At Tynecastle Park.

=== Perth Glory ===
In July 2022, McEneff signed for A-League side Perth Glory, subject to international clearance.

=== Return to Shamrock Rovers ===
On 19 January 2024, McEneff returned to Shamrock Rovers on an initial loan deal that would become a permanent transfer at the end of the 2024 season on a long-term contract.

=== Glentoran ===
On 25 January 2026, McEneff signed for NIFL Premiership club Glentoran for an undisclosed fee.

== International career ==
McEneff has represented Northern Ireland at U21, U19, and U17 levels. He was a member of the Northern Ireland U19 team which won the 2014 Milk Cup Elite Section, scoring the winning goal against Canada U20. It was reported in August 2016 that McEneff was set to switch allegiance to the Republic of Ireland, however although he has had discussions about his future, no decision has been made and he has put his international career on hold for the time being. Northern Ireland manager Michael O'Neill was critical of the FAI for entering into discussions with McEneff describing them as "morally poor", however Republic of Ireland U21 boss Noel King responded by clarifying that the initial communication had come from McEneff's Dublin-born father and in the end the discussions did not lead to the paperwork going through.

On 16 November 2020, McEneff was called up Stephen Kenny's Republic of Ireland senior squad for the Nations League game against Bulgaria.

== Career statistics ==
As of match played on 4 September 2026

Appearances and goals by club, season and competition
Club	Season	League			National cup (Note: Includes FAI Cup, Scottish Cup, Australia Cup & Irish Cup)		League cup (Note: Includes League of Ireland Cup, Scottish League Cup & Northern Ireland Football League Cup)		Continental		Other		Total	
Club	Season	Division	Apps	Goals	Apps	Goals	Apps	Goals	Apps	Goals	Apps	Goals	Apps	Goals
Derry City	2015	LOI Premier Division	9	0	2	0	0	0	—		—		11	0
Derry City	2016	LOI Premier Division	29	6	5	1	3	0	—		—		37	7
Derry City	2017	LOI Premier Division	29	9	1	0	1	0	2 (Note: Appearances in UEFA Europa League)	1	—		33	10
Derry City	2018	LOI Premier Division	35	10	3	2	4	3	2	0	—		44	15
Derry City	Total		102	25	11	3	8	3	4	1	—		125	32
Shamrock Rovers	2019	LOI Premier Division	27	9	5	2	1	0	4	0	0	0	37	11
Shamrock Rovers	2020	LOI Premier Division	17	3	4	4	—		2	0	—		23	7
Shamrock Rovers	Total		44	12	9	6	1	0	6	0	0	0	60	18
Heart of Midlothian	2020–21	Scottish Championship	13	2	1	0	—		—		—		14	2
Heart of Midlothian	2021–22	Scottish Premiership	14	1	4	1	4	1	—		—		22	3
Heart of Midlothian	Total		27	3	5	1	4	1	—		—		36	5
Perth Glory	2022–23	A-League	13	3	—		—		—		—		13	3
Perth Glory	2023–24	A-League	2	0	1	0	—		—		—		3	0
Perth Glory	Total		15	3	1	0	—		—		—		16	3
Shamrock Rovers (loan)	2024	LOI Premier Division	12	0	0	0	—		5 (Note: 3 appearances in the UEFA Europa League; 2 appearances in the UEFA Conference League)	0	0	0	17	0
Shamrock Rovers	2025	LOI Premier Division	24	3	2	0	—		9 (Note: 2 appearances in the 2024–25 UEFA Conference League campaign; 7 appearances in the 2025–26 UEFA Conference League campaign)	0	0	0	35	3
Glentoran	2025–26	NIFL Premiership	13	4	1	0	2	0	—		—		16	4
Glentoran	2026–27	NIFL Premiership	5	2	0	0	0	0	2 (Note: Appearanes in the UEFA Conference League)	0	0	0	7	2
Glentoran	Total		18	6	1	0	2	0	2	0	0	0	23	6
Career total			242	52	29	10	17	4	26	1	0	0	302	67

== Honours ==
Derry City

- League of Ireland Cup: 2018

Shamrock Rovers

- FAI Cup: 2019
- League of Ireland Premier Division: 2020

Heart of Midlothian

- Scottish Championship: 2020–21
