= 2024–25 Raith Rovers F.C. season =

Raith Rovers
2024–25 season
- Chairman: Steven MacDonald
- Manager: Ian Murray (until 4 August); Colin Cameron & John Potter (caretakers) (from 4 August to 2 September & 21 December to 29 December); Neill Collins (from 3 September to 21 December); Barry Robson (from 29 December)
- Stadium: Stark's Park
- Championship: 5th
- Scottish Cup: 5th Round
- League Cup: Group Stage
- Challenge Cup: 3rd Round
- Top goalscorer: League: Dylan Easton (13 goals); All: Dylan Easton (17 goals)
- Highest home attendance: 5,586
- Lowest home attendance: 1,435
- Average home league attendance: 3,977
Home colours	Away colours	Third colours

The 2024–25 season was Raith Rovers' fifth season back in the second tier of Scottish football after being promoted from Scottish League One at the end of the 2019–20 season. Raith Rovers also competed in the League Cup, Challenge Cup and the Scottish Cup.

== Summary ==
=== Management ===
Raith were led by manager Ian Murray until 4 August 2024, with the club stating that results and performances since the turn of the year had fallen short of expectations. The 2024–25 season marked his third at the club.

Colin Cameron and John Potter took over on an interim basis. On 3 September 2024, it was announced that Neill Collins had been appointed as the clubs new head coach. On 21 December 2024, it was announced that Collins would be leaving the club, after the financial release clause in his contract was met by Sacramento Republic. He had managed the club for just one hundred and nineteen days. Colin Cameron and John Potter again took over on an interim basis.

On 29 December 2024, Barry Robson was appointed as manager on a two and a half year contract.

== Results & fixtures ==
Win Draw Loss Postponed

=== Friendlies ===
29 June 2024 Pat Slattery Testimonial	East Fife	0–0	Raith Rovers	Bayview Stadium
14:00		Raith Report

3 July 2024 Friendly	Montrose	0–1	Raith Rovers	Links Park
19:45		Raith Report	Smith 40'

6 July 2024 Friendly	Raith Rovers	1–0	Inverness Caledonian Thistle	Stark's Park
14:00	Hanlon 86'	Raith Report		Referee: Kevin Clancy

13 August 2024 Friendly	Kirkcaldy & Dysart	0–3	Raith Rovers	Alex Penman Park
19:00		Raith Report	Connolly 52'; Smith 61'; Matthews 80'	Attendance: 570

9 October 2024 Ross Matthews Testimonial	Raith Rovers	3–1	Heart of Midlothian	Stark's Park
19:45	Jamieson 47'; Hamilton 85'; Easton 87'	Raith Report	Spittal 25'	Attendance: 1,281

=== Scottish Championship ===
3 August 2024 1	Airdrieonians	1–0	Raith Rovers	Excelsior Stadium
15:00	MacDonald 75'	Raith Report		Attendance: 1,462; Referee: Ross Hardie

10 August 2024 2	Raith Rovers	1–0	Partick Thistle	Stark's Park
15:00	Easton 27' (pen.)	Raith Report		Attendance: 4,002; Referee: Peter Stuart

24 August 2024 3	Ayr United	2–0	Raith Rovers	Somerset Park
15:00	Dowds 40' (pen.); Walker 90'	Raith Report		Attendance: 2,928; Referee: Iain Snedden

31 August 2024 4	Raith Rovers	0–1	Livingston	Stark's Park
15:00		Raith Report	Brandon 90'	Attendance: 3,517; Referee: Colin Steven

13 September 2024 5	Dunfermline Athletic	2–0	Raith Rovers	East End Park
19:45	Otoo 52'; Wotherspoon 80'	Raith Report		Attendance: 6,993; Referee: Craig Napier

21 September 2024 6	Raith Rovers	3–3	Hamilton Academical	Stark's Park
15:00	Stevenson 15'; Pollock 36'; Easton 54'	Raith Report	O'Hara 2' (pen.); Smith 79'; Shaw 90'	Attendance: 3,322; Referee: Lloyd Wilson

28 September 2024 7	Raith Rovers	1–0	Falkirk	Stark's Park
15:00	Hamilton 11' (pen.)	Raith Report		Attendance: 5,030; Referee: Matthew MacDermid

5 October 2024 8	Greenock Morton	2–0	Raith Rovers	Cappielow
15:00	Stuparević 49'; Garrity 54'	Raith Report		Attendance: 2,976; Referee: Iain Snedden

19 October 2024 9	Raith Rovers	1–1	Queen's Park	Stark's Park
15:00	Hamilton 39' (pen.)	Raith Report	McLeish 62'	Attendance: 3,396; Referee: Calum Scott

26 October 2024 10	Livingston	2–1	Raith Rovers	Almondvale Stadium
15:00	Wilson 75'; Nottingham 90'	Raith Report	Hamilton 21'	Attendance: 1,750; Referee: Ross Hardie

29 October 2024 11	Raith Rovers	1–0	Airdrieonians	Stark's Park
19:45	Brown 20'	Raith Report		Attendance: 3,258; Referee: Nick Walsh

1 November 2024 12	Raith Rovers	2–0	Ayr United	Stark's Park
19:45	Jamieson 19', 43'	Raith Report		Attendance: 3,427; Referee: Lloyd Wilson

9 November 2024 13	Partick Thistle	1–1	Raith Rovers	Firhill Stadium
15:00	Graham 6'	Raith Report	Easton 68'	Attendance: 4,348; Referee: Steven McLean

16 November 2024 14	Raith Rovers	2–3	Greenock Morton	Stark's Park
15:00	Delaney 59' (o.g.); Easton 81' (pen.)	Raith Report	Stuparević 6', 25'; Garrity 90'	Attendance: 3,508; Referee: Dan McFarlane

7 December 2024 16	Falkirk	3–0	Raith Rovers	Falkirk Stadium
15:00	Agyeman 5', 57'; Adams 66'	Raith Report		Attendance: 6,248; Referee: Graham Grainger

14 December 2024 17	Raith Rovers	2–0	Dunfermline Athletic	Stark's Park
15:00	Easton 42'; David 74'	Raith Report		Attendance: 5,542; Referee: Calum Scott

20 December 2024 18	Queen's Park	1–2	Raith Rovers	Hampden Park
19:45	Duncan 74'	Raith Report	Jamieson 41' (pen.); Connolly 69'	Attendance: 1,141; Referee: Grant Irvine

28 December 2024 19	Raith Rovers	2–1	Livingston	Stark's Park
15:00	Easton 7'; Connolly 28'	Raith Report	May 65' (pen.)	Attendance: 3,955; Referee: Euan Anderson

4 January 2025 20	Ayr United	3–0	Raith Rovers	Somerset Park
15:00	Oakley 2', 12', 25'	Raith Report		Attendance: 2,733; Referee: Colin Steven

25 January 2025 22	Raith Rovers	0–2	Falkirk	Stark's Park
15:00		Raith Report	Henderson 6'; MacIver 60'	Attendance: 4,495; Referee: Calum Scott

28 January 2025 15	Hamilton Academical	0–3	Raith Rovers	New Douglas Park
19:45		Raith Report	Pollock 3'; Gullan 7'; Marsh 31'	Attendance: 1,005; Referee: Duncan Nicolson

1 February 2025 23	Dunfermline Athletic	3–1	Raith Rovers	East End Park
15:00	Kane 51' (pen.), 65', 76' (pen.)	Raith Report	Easton 43' (pen.)	Attendance: 6,812; Referee: Grant Irvine

15 February 2025 24	Raith Rovers	3–0	Partick Thistle	Stark's Park
15:00	Pollock 8', 26'; Easton 62' (pen.)	Raith Report		Attendance: 3,749; Referee: Lloyd Wilson

22 February 2025 25	Raith Rovers	2–0	Hamilton Academical	Stark's Park
15:00	Easton 30' (pen.); Pollock 64'	Raith Report		Attendance: 3,344; Referee: Ross Hardie

25 February 2025 26	Airdrieonians	1–0	Raith Rovers	Excelsior Stadium
19:45	McGrattan 78'	Raith Report		Attendance: 1,583; Referee: Peter Stuart

1 March 2025 27	Raith Rovers	0–4	Queen's Park	Stark's Park
15:00		Raith Report	Rudden 29'; Devine 49'; Montgomery 51'; Ujdur 72'	Attendance: 3,600; Referee: Dan McFarlane

5 March 2025 28	Livingston	0–0	Raith Rovers	Almondvale Stadium
19:45		Raith Report		Attendance: 1,331; Referee: Calum Scott

14 March 2025 29	Raith Rovers	2–0	Dunfermline Athletic	Stark's Park
19:45	Pollock 22'; Hanlon 56'	Raith Report		Attendance: 5,586; Referee: Ross Hardie

21 March 2025 30	Partick Thistle	0–0	Raith Rovers	Firhill Stadium
19:45		Raith Report		Attendance: 3,213; Referee: Calum Scott

25 March 2025 21	Greenock Morton	3–3	Raith Rovers	Cappielow
19:45	Shaw 31'; Blues 63'; Adeloye 75'	Raith Report	Gullan 11', 20'; Connolly 90'	Attendance: 1,750; Referee: Lloyd Wilson

29 March 2025 31	Hamilton Academical	0–3	Raith Rovers	New Douglas Park
15:00		Raith Report	Easton 43'; Fordyce 65'; Mullin 75'	Attendance: 1,007; Referee: Dan McFarlane

5 April 2025 32	Raith Rovers	1–0	Ayr United	Stark's Park
15:00	Easton 62'	Raith Report		Attendance: 3,919; Referee: Chris Graham

12 April 2025 33	Raith Rovers	1–1	Airdrieonians	Stark's Park
15:00	Gullan 41'	Raith Report	Mochrie 19'	Attendance: 3,898; Referee: Ryan Lee

19 April 2025 34	Falkirk	1–3	Raith Rovers	Falkirk Stadium
15:00	Miller 17'	Raith Report	Marsh 88'; Hanlon 90'; Easton 90'	Attendance: 7,539; Referee: Ross Hardie

26 April 2025 35	Raith Rovers	1–1	Greenock Morton	Stark's Park
15:00	Mullin 38'	Raith Report	Gillespie 28' (pen.)	Attendance: 4,033; Referee: Chris Graham

2 May 2025 36	Queen's Park	1–5	Raith Rovers	Hampden Park
19:45	Drozd 50'	Raith Report	Fordyce 41'; Vaughan 45' (pen.), 59'; Easton 74' (pen.); Marsh 85'	Attendance: 2,609; Referee: Ryan Lee

=== Scottish League Cup ===
13 July 2024 Group H	Stirling Albion	0–3	Raith Rovers	Forthbank Stadium
15:00		Raith Report	Connolly 17', 25', 66'	Attendance: 1,202; Referee: Greg Soutar

16 July 2024 Group H	Raith Rovers	2–1	Stranraer	Stark's Park
19:45	Hamilton 5'; Murray 90'	Raith Report	Dunlop 84'	Attendance: 1,435; Referee: Grant Irvine

20 July 2024 Group H	Ross County	2–1	Raith Rovers	Victoria Park
15:00	White 29'; Harmon 87'	Raith Report	Smith 51'	Attendance: 1,228; Referee: Euan Anderson

27 July 2024 Group H	Raith Rovers	1–1 (5–3 p)	Hamilton Academical	Stark's Park
15:00	Kilday 61' (o.g)	Raith Report	McGinty 56'	Attendance: 1,910; Referee: Chris Graham
	Penalties
	Connolly (penalty scored); Smith (penalty scored); Gibson (penalty scored); Easton (penalty scored); Hamilton (penalty scored)		MacDonald (penalty missed); Murray (penalty scored); Todorov (penalty scored); Bradley (penalty scored)

=== Scottish Challenge Cup ===
8 September 2024 Round 3	Ayr United	3–2	Raith Rovers	Somerset Park
13:00	Dowds 49' (pen.), 69'; Oakley 70'	Raith Report	Smith 11'; Easton 15'	Attendance: 1,750; Referee: Graham Grainger

=== Scottish Cup ===
30 November 2024 Round 3	Linlithgow Rose	0–4	Raith Rovers	Prestonfield
15:00		Raith Report	Gibson 22'; Easton 49' (pen.), 58'; Hamilton 85'	Referee: Alastair Grieve

19 January 2025 Round 4	Falkirk	1–2 (a.e.t.)	Raith Rovers	Falkirk Stadium
12:00	Morrison 79'	Raith Report	Stanton 86'; Easton 109' (pen.)	Attendance: 4,557; Referee: Don Robertson

8 February 2025 Round 5	Celtic	5–0	Raith Rovers	Celtic Park
17:30	Maeda 6', 45', 77'; McCowan 47'; Yang 56'	Raith Report		Attendance: 39,207; Referee: Chris Graham

== Player statistics ==
=== Squad ===
Last updated 2 May 2025

No.	Pos	Nat	Player	Total		Championship		League Cup		Scottish Cup		Challenge Cup	
No.	Pos	Nat	Player	Apps	Goals	Apps	Goals	Apps	Goals	Apps	Goals	Apps	Goals
1	GK	(Poland) POL	Kevin Dąbrowski	29	0	22+0	0	4+0	0	2+0	0	1+0	0
3	DF	(Scotland) SCO	Liam Dick	29	0	19+5	0	1+0	0	3+0	0	1+0	0
4	DF	(Scotland) SCO	Paul Hanlon	37	2	33+0	2	0+0	0	3+0	0	1+0	0
5	DF	(Scotland) SCO	Callum Fordyce	23	2	17+2	2	4+0	0	0+0	0	0+0	0
6	DF	(Scotland) SCO	Euan Murray	24	1	17+1	0	3+0	1	3+0	0	0+0	0
7	MF	(Scotland) SCO	Aidan Connolly	30	6	8+15	3	3+1	3	0+2	0	0+1	0
8	MF	(Scotland) SCO	Ross Matthews	39	0	29+2	0	2+2	0	3+0	0	1+0	0
9	FW	(Scotland) SCO	Jack Hamilton	18	5	10+3	3	2+2	1	0+1	1	0+0	0
10	FW	(Scotland) SCO	Lewis Vaughan	13	2	6+6	2	0+0	0	0+0	0	0+1	0
11	FW	(Scotland) SCO	Callum Smith	16	2	6+5	0	2+2	1	0+0	0	1+0	1
13	GK	(Scotland) SCO	Andrew McNeil	0	0	0+0	0	0+0	0	0+0	0	0+0	0
14	MF	(Scotland) SCO	Josh Mullin	35	2	18+9	2	2+2	0	1+2	0	1+0	0
17	FW	(Scotland) SCO	Lewis Gibson	22	1	5+10	0	0+4	0	1+1	1	1+0	0
19	MF	(Scotland) SCO	Finlay Pollock	25	6	18+5	6	0+0	0	1+1	0	0+0	0
20	MF	(Scotland) SCO	Scott Brown	28	1	20+2	1	3+0	0	3+0	0	0+0	0
21	MF	(Scotland) SCO	Shaun Byrne	29	0	19+4	0	3+1	0	0+1	0	1+0	0
22	DF	(Republic of Ireland) IRL	Jordan Doherty	19	0	17+0	0	0+0	0	2+0	0	0+0	0
23	MF	(Scotland) SCO	Dylan Easton	43	17	34+1	13	4+0	0	3+0	3	1+0	1
24	FW	(Scotland) SCO	Lewis Jamieson	18	3	11+6	3	0+0	0	0+0	0	1+0	0
25	MF	(Scotland) SCO	Kai Montagu	16	0	1+11	0	1+1	0	0+2	0	0+0	0
26	DF	(Scotland) SCO	Lewis Stevenson	43	1	34+2	1	4+0	0	2+0	0	1+0	0
27	DF	(Scotland) SCO	Callum Hannah	0	0	0+0	0	0+0	0	0+0	0	0+0	0
29	DF	(Germany) GER	George Gitau	0	0	0+0	0	0+0	0	0+0	0	0+0	0
30	MF	(Scotland) SCO	Jake Nicholson	0	0	0+0	0	0+0	0	0+0	0	0+0	0
32	FW	(Scotland) SCO	Jamie Gullan	17	4	15+1	4	0+0	0	1+0	0	0+0	0
37	FW	(England) ENG	Aiden Marsh	15	3	1+12	3	0+0	0	1+1	0	0+0	0
63	GK	(Scotland) SCO	Josh Rae	15	0	14+0	0	0+0	0	1+0	0	0+0	0
Players transferred or loaned out during the season who made an appearance
2	DF	(Scotland) SCO	Kieran Freeman	13	0	7+0	0	4+0	0	0+1	0	0+1	0
16	MF	(Scotland) SCO	Sam Stanton	14	1	7+1	0	2+1	0	1+1	1	0+1	0
18	DF	(England) ENG	Fankaty Dabo	10	0	7+2	0	0+0	0	1+0	0	0+0	0
29	FW	(Nigeria) NGA	Cody David	8	1	0+7	1	0+0	0	1+0	0	0+0	0

=== Disciplinary record ===
Includes all competitive matches.

Last updated May 2025

Number	Position	Nation	Name	Championship		League Cup		Scottish Cup		Challenge Cup		Total	
Number	Position	Nation	Name	Booked	Sent off (straight red)	Booked	Sent off (straight red)	Booked	Sent off (straight red)	Booked	Sent off (straight red)	Booked	Sent off (straight red)
1	GK	(Poland)	Kevin Dąbrowski	1	0	0	0	0	0	0	0	1	0
2	DF	(Scotland)	Kieran Freeman	1	0	0	0	0	0	0	0	1	0
3	DF	(Scotland)	Liam Dick	1	1	1	0	0	0	0	0	2	1
4	DF	(Scotland)	Paul Hanlon	4	0	0	0	0	0	0	0	4	0
5	DF	(Scotland)	Callum Fordyce	0	0	1	0	0	0	0	0	1	0
6	DF	(Scotland)	Euan Murray	1	1	0	0	1	0	0	0	2	1
7	MF	(Scotland)	Aidan Connolly	1	0	0	0	0	0	0	0	1	0
8	MF	(Scotland)	Ross Matthews	9	0	0	0	2	0	1	0	12	0
9	FW	(Scotland)	Jack Hamilton	0	0	0	0	0	0	0	0	0	0
10	FW	(Scotland)	Lewis Vaughan	1	0	0	0	0	0	0	0	1	0
11	FW	(Scotland)	Callum Smith	0	0	0	0	0	0	0	0	0	0
13	GK	(Scotland)	Andrew McNeil	0	0	0	0	0	0	0	0	0	0
14	MF	(Scotland)	Josh Mullin	2	0	0	0	0	0	0	0	2	0
16	MF	(Scotland)	Sam Stanton	0	0	0	0	1	0	0	0	1	0
17	FW	(Scotland)	Lewis Gibson	0	0	0	0	0	0	1	0	1	0
18	DF	(England)	Fankaty Dabo	0	0	0	0	0	0	0	0	0	0
19	MF	(Scotland)	Finlay Pollock	1	0	0	0	1	0	0	0	2	0
20	MF	(Scotland)	Scott Brown	11	0	0	0	0	0	0	0	11	0
21	MF	(Scotland)	Shaun Byrne	5	1	0	0	0	0	0	0	5	1
22	DF	(Republic of Ireland)	Jordan Doherty	2	0	0	0	0	0	0	0	2	0
23	MF	(Scotland)	Dylan Easton	6	1	1	0	0	0	0	0	7	1
24	FW	(Scotland)	Lewis Jamieson	1	0	0	0	0	0	0	0	1	0
25	MF	(Scotland)	Kai Montagu	1	0	0	0	0	0	0	0	1	0
26	DF	(Scotland)	Lewis Stevenson	5	0	0	0	0	0	0	0	5	0
27	DF	(Scotland)	Callum Hannah	0	0	0	0	0	0	0	0	0	0
29	FW	(Nigeria)	Cody David	0	0	0	0	0	0	0	0	0	0
29	DF	(Germany)	George Gitau	0	0	0	0	0	0	0	0	0	0
30	MF	(Scotland)	Jake Nicholson	0	0	0	0	0	0	0	0	0	0
32	FW	(Scotland)	Jamie Gullan	3	0	0	0	0	0	0	0	3	0
37	FW	(England)	Aiden Marsh	1	0	0	0	0	0	0	0	1	0
63	GK	(Scotland)	Josh Rae	1	0	0	0	0	0	0	0	1	0

== Team statistics ==
=== League table ===
Pos	Team	Pld	W	D	L	GF	GA	GD	Pts	Promotion, qualification or relegation
3	Ayr United	36	18	9	9	57	39	+18	63	Qualification for the Premiership play-off quarter-final
4	Partick Thistle	36	15	10	11	43	38	+5	55	Qualification for the Premiership play-off quarter-final
5	Raith Rovers	36	15	8	13	47	43	+4	53	
6	Greenock Morton	36	12	12	12	42	48	−6	48	
7	Dunfermline Athletic	36	9	8	19	28	43	−15	35	

Rules for classification: 1) Points; 2) Goal difference; 3) Goals scored; 4) Head-to-to head points; 5) Head-to-head goal difference; 6) Play-off (only for deciding promotion, play-off participation and relegation).

=== League Cup table ===
Pos	Team	Pld	W	PW	PL	L	GF	GA	GD	Pts	Qualification	ROS	RAI	HAM	STI	STR
1	Ross County	4	4	0	0	0	10	3	+7	12	Qualification for the second round	—	2–1	—	3–0	—
2	Raith Rovers	4	2	1	0	1	7	4	+3	8		—	—	p1–1	—	2–1
3	Hamilton Academical	4	1	0	2	1	5	3	+2	5		1–2	—	—	0–0p	—
4	Stirling Albion	4	0	2	0	2	2	8	−6	4		—	0–3	—	—	p2–2
5	Stranraer	4	0	0	1	3	4	10	−6	1		1–3	—	0–3	—	—

Rules for classification: 1) goal difference, 2) goals scored, 3) away goals scored, 4) matches won, 5) away matches won, 6) drawing of lots.

=== Management statistics ===
Last updated on 2 May 2025

Name	From	To	P	W	D	L	Win% (Note: Win% is the percentage of matches won rounded to two decimal places.)
Ian Murray	13 July 2024	4 August 2024	5	3	0	2	60.00
Colin Cameron & John Potter (caretakers, spell 1)	4 August 2024	2 September 2024	3	1	0	2	33.33
Neill Collins	3 September 2024	21 December 2024	15	6	3	6	40.00
Colin Cameron & John Potter (caretakers, spell 2)	21 December 2024	29 December 2024	1	1	0	0	100.00
Barry Robson	29 December 2024		20	9	5	6	45.00

== Transfers ==
=== Players in ===
Player	From	Fee
(Scotland) Callum Fordyce	(Scotland) Airdrieonians	Free
(Scotland) Kai Montagu	(Scotland) East Kilbride	Free
(Scotland) Shaun Byrne	(Scotland) Dundee	Free
(Scotland) Lewis Gibson	(Scotland) Queen of the South	Free
(Scotland) Paul Hanlon	(Scotland) Hibernian	Free
(Scotland) Lewis Stevenson	(Scotland) Hibernian	Free
(Scotland) Kieran Freeman	(Republic of Ireland) St Patrick's Athletic	Free
(Scotland) Lewis Jamieson	(Scotland) St Mirren	Loan
(Scotland) Finlay Pollock	(Scotland) Heart of Midlothian	Loan
(England) Fankaty Dabo	Free agent	Free
(Nigeria) Cody David	Free agent	Free
(Republic of Ireland) Jordan Doherty	(United States) Tampa Bay Rowdies	Free
(England) Aiden Marsh	(England) Barnsley	Loan
(Germany) George Gitau	(England) Middlesbrough	Loan
(Scotland) Jamie Gullan	(Republic of Ireland) Dundalk	Free
(Scotland) Josh Rae	(Scotland) St Johnstone	Loan

=== Players out ===
Player	To	Fee
(Scotland) Dylan Corr	(Scotland) Greenock Morton	Free
(Scotland) Robbie Thomson	Retired	
(Scotland) Keith Watson	(Scotland) Arbroath	Free
(Scotland) Adam Masson	(Scotland) Bo'ness United	Free
(Scotland) Aaron Arnott	(Scotland) Bonnyrigg Rose	Free
(Scotland) Ethan Ross	(Scotland) Falkirk	Free
(Scotland) Ross Millen	(England) Morecambe	Free
(Scotland) Scott McGill	(Republic of Ireland) Dundalk	Free
(England) Fankaty Dabo	Free agent	Free
(Nigeria) Cody David	(Finland) IFK Mariehamn	Free
(Scotland) Sam Stanton	(Scotland) Arbroath	Loan
(Scotland) Kieran Freeman	(Scotland) Montrose	Loan
