= 2021–22 Heart of Midlothian F.C. season =

Heart of Midlothian
2021–22 season
- Chairman: Ann Budge
- Manager: Robbie Neilson
- Stadium: Tynecastle Park
- Scottish Premiership: 3rd
- Scottish Cup: Runners-up
- League Cup: Second round
- Top goalscorer: League: Liam Boyce (10); All: Liam Boyce (16)
- Highest home attendance: 19,041 v. Hibernian, 9 April
- Lowest home attendance: 5,272 v. Celtic, 31 July
- Average home league attendance: 16,714
Home colours	Away colours	Third colours

The 2021–22 season was the 141st season of competitive football by Heart of Midlothian. It is the club's first season of play back in the top tier of Scottish football, having been promoted from the Scottish Championship at the end of the previous season.

They also competed in that season's Scottish League Cup and Scottish Cup.

== Results and fixtures ==
Win Draw Loss Postponed

=== Pre-season / Friendlies ===
26 June 2021 Friendly	Linlithgow Rose	0–6	Heart of Midlothian	Prestonfield
		Report	Pollock; Boyce (pen.) (pen.); Smith; Gnanduillet; Kirk	Attendance: 500

29 June 2021 Friendly	Civil Service Strollers	0–4	Heart of Midlothian	Christie Gillies Park
		Report	Halliday 26'; Walker 47'; Gnanduillet; Kirk

29 June 2021 Friendly	The Spartans	0–7	Heart of Midlothian	Ainslie Park
		Report	Boyce 5'; Halkett; Mackay-Steven 47', 56'; Damour; Cochrane 54'

2 July 2021 Friendly	Heart of Midlothian	1–1	Ayr United	National Sports Training Centre
	Boyce 76'	Report	Moffat 75'

3 July 2021 Friendly	Heart of Midlothian	4–0	Falkirk	National Sports Training Centre
	Henderson 2'; Gnanduillet 31', 69'; Kingsley 89'	Report

8 July 2021 Friendly	Bonnyrigg Rose	0–3	Heart of Midlothian	New Dundas Park
		Report	Smith 19'; Gnanduillet 30'

17 July 2021 Friendly	Heart of Midlothian	0–2	Sunderland	Tynecastle Park
15:00		Hearts Report	McGeady 14' (pen.), 41'	Referee: Roncone

=== Scottish Premiership ===
31 July 2021 1	Heart of Midlothian	2–1	Celtic	Tynecastle Park
20:00	Mackay-Steven 8'; Souttar 89'	BBC Report	Ralston 54'	Attendance: 5,272; Referee: Madden
Note: Crowd limited due to COVID-19 restrictions.

7 August 2021 2	St Mirren	1–2	Heart of Midlothian	St Mirren Park
15:00	Shaughnessy 85'; Dennis (red card) 86'	BBC Report	Halliday 16'; Boyce 73'	Attendance: 1,039; Referee: Duncan

22 August 2021 3	Heart of Midlothian	1–1	Aberdeen	Tynecastle Park
15:00	Boyce 56' (pen.)	BBC Report	Ojo 71'	Attendance: 17,449; Referee: Madden

28 August 2021 4	Dundee United	0–2	Heart of Midlothian	Tannadice Park
15:00		BBC Report	Boyce 45+1' (pen.); Gnanduillet 90'	Attendance: 9,234; Referee: Aitken

12 September 2021 5	Heart of Midlothian	0–0	Hibernian	Tynecastle Park
12:00		BBC Report		Attendance: 18,177; Referee: Walsh

18 September 2021 6	Ross County	2–2	Heart of Midlothian	Victoria Park
15:00	Spittal 10', 45'	BBC Report	Boyce 9'; Kingsley 66'	Attendance: 3,802; Referee: Dickinson

25 September 2021 7	Heart of Midlothian	3–0	Livingston	Tynecastle Park
15:00	Smith 25'; Boyce 33' (pen.); Cochrane 64'	BBC Report		Attendance: 16,175; Referee: Duncan

2 October 2021 8	Heart of Midlothian	2–0	Motherwell	Tynecastle Park
15:00	Boyce 5' (pen.); Kingsley 22'	BBC Report		Attendance: 17,028; Referee: Munro

16 October 2021 9	Rangers	1–1	Heart of Midlothian	Ibrox Stadium
15:00	Lundstram 40'	BBC Report	Halkett 90'	Attendance: 49,650; Referee: Robertson

23 October 2021 10	Heart of Midlothian	1–1	Dundee	Tynecastle Park
15:00	Souttar 37'	BBC Report	Cummings 83'	Attendance: 17,557; Referee: Duncan

27 October 2021 11	St Johnstone	1–1	Heart of Midlothian	McDiarmid Park
19:45	Gordon 11'	BBC Report	Ginnelly 40'	Attendance: 6,083; Referee: McLean

30 October 2021 12	Aberdeen	2–1	Heart of Midlothian	Pittodrie Stadium
15:00	Watkins 49'; Ferguson 69'	BBC Report	Souttar 45+2' (pen.); Halliday (red card) 89'	Attendance: 9,736; Referee: Clancy

6 November 2021 13	Heart of Midlothian	5–2	Dundee United	Tynecastle Park
15:00	Woodburn 22', 50'; Cochrane 25'; Kingsley 76'; McEneff 86'	BBC Report	Edwards 34'; Clark 62'	Attendance: 18,129; Referee: Beaton

20 November 2021 14	Motherwell	2–0	Heart of Midlothian	Fir Park
15:00	Shields 23'; Lamie 66'	BBC Report	Moore (yellow card) 48' (yellow-red card) 64'	Attendance: 7,908; Referee: Collum

27 November 2021 15	Heart of Midlothian	2–0	St Mirren	Tynecastle Park
15:00	Mackay-Steven 61'; Kingsley 75'	BBC Report	Shaughnessy (yellow card) 16' (yellow-red card) 90+5'	Attendance: 17,311; Referee: Muir

2 December 2021 16	Celtic	1–0	Heart of Midlothian	Celtic Park
19:45	Furuhashi 33'	BBC Report		Referee: Madden

5 December 2021 17	Livingston	0–1	Heart of Midlothian	Tony Macaroni Arena
15:00		BBC Report	Boyce 49'	Attendance: 5,597; Referee: Clancy

12 December 2021 18	Heart of Midlothian	0–2	Rangers	Tynecastle Park
12:00	Ginnelly (yellow card) 35' (yellow-red card) 80'	BBC Report	Morelos 9'; Aribo 13'	Attendance: 18,593; Referee: Walsh

18 December 2021 19	Dundee	0–1	Heart of Midlothian	Dens Park
15:00		BBC Report	Walker 75'	Attendance: 5,874; Referee: Collum

26 December 2021 20	Heart of Midlothian	2–1	Ross County	Tynecastle Park
15:00	Smith 4'; Woodburn 42'	BBC Report	White 72'	Referee: Munro
Note: Behind closed doors due to COVID-19 restrictions.

18 January 2022 21	Heart of Midlothian	2–0	St Johnstone	Tynecastle Park
19:45	Ginnelly 46', 75'	BBC Report		Attendance: 16,589; Referee: Walsh

26 January 2022 22	Heart of Midlothian	1–2	Celtic	Tynecastle Park
19:45	Boyce 62'	BBC Report	Hatate 27'; Giakoumakis 35'	Attendance: 17,967; Referee: Beaton

29 January 2022 23	Heart of Midlothian	2–0	Motherwell	Tynecastle Park
15:00	Halliday 37'; Simms 58'	BBC Report		Attendance: 17,699; Referee: Napier

1 February 2022 24	Hibernian	0–0	Heart of Midlothian	Easter Road
19:45		BBC Report		Attendance: 20,419; Referee: Robertson

6 February 2022 25	Rangers	5–0	Heart of Midlothian	Ibrox Stadium
16:00	Morelos 11', 64'; Kamara 72'; Arfield 75'; Sakala 84'	BBC Report		Referee: Collum

9 February 2022 26	Heart of Midlothian	1–2	Dundee	Tynecastle Park
19:45	Simms 21'	BBC Report	Sibbick 51' (o.g.); Mullen 78'	Attendance: 15,527; Referee: Steven

19 February 2022 27	St Johnstone	2–1	Heart of Midlothian	McDiarmid Park
15:00	Crawford 1'; McCart 56'	BBC Report	Atkinson 6'	Attendance: 4,409; Referee: Irvine

26 February 2022 28	St Mirren	0–2	Heart of Midlothian	St Mirren Park
15:00	Ronan (red card) 22'	BBC Report	Simms 64'; Devlin 67'	Attendance: 5,767; Referee: Aitken

2 March 2022 29	Heart of Midlothian	2–0	Aberdeen	Tynecastle Park
19:45	Souttar 38'; Kingsley 60'	BBC Report		Attendance: 16,703; Referee: McLean

5 March 2022 30	Dundee United	2–2	Heart of Midlothian	Tannadice Park
15:00	Boyce 1'; Halkett 81'	BBC Report	Smith 46'; Clark 57' (pen.)	Attendance: 7,172; Referee: Clancy

19 March 2022 31	Heart of Midlothian	2–0	Livingston	Tynecastle Park
15:00	Baningime 3'; McKay 58'	BBC Report		Attendance: 17,957; Referee: Anderson

2 April 2022 32	Ross County	1–1	Heart of Midlothian	Victoria Park
15:00	Iacovitti 31'	BBC Report	McKay 39'	Attendance: 5,210; Referee: Duncan

9 April 2022 33	Heart of Midlothian	3–1	Hibernian	Tynecastle Park
15:00	Halliday 45+1' 58'; Kingsley 47'	BBC Report	Wright 5'	Attendance: 19,041; Referee: Walsh

24 April 2022 34	Dundee United	2–3	Heart of Midlothian	Tannadice Park
15:00	Levitt 4'; Edwards 65'	BBC Report	Boyce 44'; Ginnelly 59'; Simms 83'	Attendance: 6,429; Referee: Steven

30 April 2022 35	Heart of Midlothian	0–0	Ross County	Tynecastle Park
15:00		BBC Report		Attendance: 16,699; Referee: McLean

7 May 2022 36	Celtic	4–1	Heart of Midlothian	Celtic Park
12:00	Maeda 30'; Furuhashi 37'; O'Riley 69'; Giakoumakis 90'	BBC Report	Simms 3'	Referee: Robertson

11 May 2022 37	Motherwell	2–1	Heart of Midlothian	Fir Park
19:45	Efford 3'; Lamie 56'	BBC Report	Ginnelly 9'	Attendance: 5,769; Referee: MacDermid

14 May 2022 38	Heart of Midlothian	1–3	Rangers	Tynecastle Park
12:15	Haring 24'	BBC Report	Itten 33'; Lowry 45+1'; McKinnon 81'	Attendance: 16,969; Referee: Clancy

=== Scottish Cup ===
22 January 2022 Fourth round	Auchinleck Talbot	0–5	Heart of Midlothian	Beechwood Park
12:30			Halliday 14'; Boyce 39' (pen.), 51'; Haring 80'; Cochrane 83'	Attendance: 3,270; Referee: Aitken

12 February 2022 Fifth round	Heart of Midlothian	0–0 (a.e.t.) (4–3 p)	Livingston	Tynecastle Park
15:00		BBC Report		Attendance: 12,232; Referee: Walsh
	Penalties
	Souttar (penalty scored); Haring (penalty scored); Woodburn (penalty scored); Simms (penalty scored)		(penalty scored) Shinnie; (penalty scored) Kelly; (penalty scored) Holt; (penalty missed) Montaño; (penalty missed) Obileye

12 March 2022 Quarter-final	Heart of Midlothian	4–2	St Mirren	Tynecastle Park
19:45	Baningime 16'; Haring 29'; McEneff 67'; Simms 85'	BBC Report	Brophy 36'; Ronan 62'	Attendance: 13,899; Referee: Madden

16 April 2022 Semi-final	Heart of Midlothian	2–1	Hibernian	Hampden Park
12:15	Simms 16'; Kingsley 21'	BBC Report	Cadden 22'; Newell (yellow card) 11' (yellow-red card) 64'	Attendance: 37,783; Referee: Beaton

21 May 2022 Final	Rangers	2–0 (a.e.t.)	Heart of Midlothian	Hampden Park
15:00	Jack 94'; Wright 97'	BBC Report		Attendance: 50,319; Referee: Collum

=== Scottish League Cup ===
==== Group stage ====
10 July 2021 1	Peterhead	0–2	Heart of Midlothian	Balmoor Stadium
15:00		BBC Report	Mackay-Steven 31'; Boyce 58'	Attendance: 246; Referee: Robertson

13 July 2021 2	Heart of Midlothian	3–0	Cove Rangers	Tynecastle Park
19:45	Halliday 12'; Boyce 45+1'; Mackay-Steven 55'	BBC Report		Attendance: 2,000; Referee: Steven

20 July 2021 3	Stirling Albion	0–2	Heart of Midlothian	Forthbank Stadium
19:45		BBC Report	Boyce 31'; Pollock 74'	Referee: Irvine

25 July 2021 4	Heart of Midlothian	1–0	Inverness Caledonian Thistle	Tynecastle Park
17:15	Walker 75'	BBC Report	Gardyne (red card) 88'	Attendance: 2,989; Referee: Walsh

==== Knockout phase ====
15 August 2021 Second round	Celtic	3–2	Heart of Midlothian	Celtic Park
15:00	Édouard 29'; Welsh 34'; Furuhashi 63'	BBC Report	Boyce 57' (pen.); McEneff 90+2'	Attendance: TBA; Referee: Beaton

== First team player statistics ==
=== Captains ===
Craig Gordon was appointed captain for the 2021–22 season, taking over from Steven Naismith who retired at the end of the previous season. Naismith took on a coaching role at the club.

No	Pos	Country	Name	No of games
1	GK	(Scotland)	Gordon	45
4	DF	(Scotland)	Souttar	1
5	MF	(Austria)	Haring	1

Last updated: 14 May 2022
Source: Competitive match reports.
Competitive matches only
Matches started as captain only
Country: FIFA nationality; No.: Squad number; P: Position; Name: Player name; No. Games: Number of games started as captain.

=== Squad information ===
During the 2021–22 campaign, Hearts used thirty players in competitive games. The table below shows the number of appearances and goals scored by each player.

Number	Position	Nation	Name	Totals		Premiership		League Cup		Scottish Cup	
Number	Position	Nation	Name	Apps	Goals	Apps	Goals	Apps	Goals	Apps	Goals
1	GK	(Scotland) SCO	Craig Gordon	46	0	36+0	0	5+0	0	5+0	0
2	DF	(Northern Ireland) NIR	Michael Smith	27	2	19+1	2	5+0	0	2+0	0
3	DF	(Scotland) SCO	Stephen Kingsley	41	7	30+2	6	5+0	0	4+0	1
4	DF	(Scotland) SCO	John Souttar	33	4	26+1	4	4+0	0	2+0	0
5	DF	(Austria) AUT	Peter Haring	41	2	20+11	0	3+2	0	4+1	2
6	MF	(Democratic Republic of the Congo) COD	Beni Baningime	27	2	23+1	1	1+0	0	2+0	1
7	MF	(Scotland) SCO	Jamie Walker	8	2	0+4	1	0+4	1	0+0	0
8	MF	(Republic of Ireland) IRL	Aaron McEneff	20	3	7+5	1	1+3	1	0+4	1
9	MF	(Wales) WAL	Ben Woodburn	30	3	16+12	3	0+0	0	1+1	0
10	FW	(Northern Ireland) NIR	Liam Boyce	40	16	29+1	10	5+0	4	4+1	2
11	MF	(Scotland) SCO	Gary Mackay-Steven	40	4	19+13	2	5+0	2	0+3	0
12	DF	(Australia) AUS	Nathaniel Atkinson	20	1	13+2	1	0+0	0	4+1	0
13	GK	(Scotland) SCO	Ross Stewart	2	0	2+0	0	0+0	0	0+0	0
14	MF	(Australia) AUS	Cameron Devlin	29	1	23+2	1	0+0	0	3+1	0
15	DF	(England) ENG	Taylor Moore	22	0	16+5	0	0+0	0	0+1	0
16	MF	(Scotland) SCO	Andy Halliday	36	6	15+11	4	4+1	1	4+1	1
17	DF	(England) ENG	Alex Cochrane	40	3	25+6	2	5+0	0	4+0	1
18	MF	(Scotland) SCO	Barrie McKay	38	2	30+3	2	0+0	0	5+0	0
19	DF	(Scotland) SCO	Craig Halkett	37	2	27+1	2	5+0	0	4+0	0
20	FW	(England) ENG	Jordan Roberts	1	0	0+0	0	0+1	0	0+0	0
20	FW	(England) ENG	Ellis Simms	21	7	11+6	5	0+0	0	4+0	2
21	FW	(Ivory Coast) CIV	Armand Gnanduillet	15	1	3+10	1	1+1	0	0+0	0
21	DF	(England) ENG	Toby Sibbick	17	0	11+3	0	0+0	0	2+1	0
22	FW	(Scotland) SCO	Euan Henderson	5	0	0+2	0	0+3	0	0+0	0
27	DF	(Scotland) SCO	Connor Smith	2	0	0+0	0	0+2	0	0+0	0
30	MF	(England) ENG	Josh Ginnelly	38	5	16+15	5	4+1	0	0+2	0
35	MF	(Scotland) SCO	Aidan Denholm	1	0	0+0	0	0+1	0	0+0	0
38	MF	(Scotland) SCO	Finlay Pollock	4	1	0+0	0	2+2	1	0+0	0
44	FW	(Northern Ireland) NIR	Makenzie Kirk	1	0	0+1	0	0+0	0	0+0	0
48	FW	(Scotland) SCO	Murray Thomas	2	0	0+2	0	0+0	0	0+0	0

- Last updated: 22 May 2022
- Source: Match Reports
- Ordered by Squad Number.

Appearances (starts and substitute appearances) and goals include those in the Scottish Premiership, League Cup and the Scottish Cup.

=== Disciplinary record ===
During the 2021–22 season, Hearts players have so far been issued eighty three yellow cards and three red cards. The table below shows the number of cards and type shown to each player.

Last updated 22 May 2022

Number	Position	Nation	Name	Premiership		League Cup		Scottish Cup		Total	
Number	Position	Nation	Name	Yellow card	Red card	Yellow card	Red card	Yellow card	Red card	Yellow card	Red card
1	GK	(Scotland)	Craig Gordon	1	0	0	0	2	0	3	0
2	DF	(Northern Ireland)	Michael Smith	1	0	0	0	0	0	1	0
3	DF	(Scotland)	Stephen Kingsley	2	0	0	0	0	0	2	0
4	DF	(Scotland)	John Souttar	4	0	0	0	0	0	4	0
5	DF	(Austria)	Peter Haring	9	0	2	0	2	0	13	0
6	MF	(Democratic Republic of the Congo)	Beni Baningime	4	0	0	0	1	0	5	0
7	MF	(Scotland)	Jamie Walker	2	0	0	0	0	0	2	0
9	FW	(England)	Ben Woodburn	4	0	0	0	0	0	4	0
10	FW	(Northern Ireland)	Liam Boyce	2	0	1	0	0	0	3	0
12	DF	(Australia)	Nathaniel Atkinson	2	0	0	0	0	0	2	0
14	MF	(Australia)	Cameron Devlin	10	0	0	0	1	0	11	0
15	DF	(England)	Taylor Moore	5	1	0	0	1	0	6	1
16	MF	(Scotland)	Andy Halliday	6	1	1	0	0	0	7	1
17	MF	(England)	Alex Cochrane	2	0	0	0	1	0	3	0
19	DF	(Scotland)	Craig Halkett	6	0	1	0	1	0	8	0
20	FW	(England)	Ellis Simms	2	0	0	0	0	0	2	0
21	FW	(Ivory Coast)	Armand Gnanduillet	1	0	0	0	0	0	1	0
21	DF	(England)	Toby Sibbick	1	0	0	0	0	0	1	0
30	MF	(England)	Josh Ginnelly	3	1	1	0	0	0	4	1
38	MF	(Scotland)	Finlay Pollock	0	0	1	0	0	0	1	0
Total				67	3	7	0	9	0	83	3

=== Goal scorers ===
Last updated 14 May 2021

Place	Position	Nation	Name	Premiership	League Cup	Scottish Cup	Total
1	FW	(Northern Ireland)	Liam Boyce	10	4	2	16
2	DF	(Scotland)	Stephen Kingsley	6	0	1	7
2	FW	(England)	Ellis Simms	5	0	2	7
3	MF	(Scotland)	Andy Halliday	4	1	1	6
4	MF	(England)	Josh Ginnelly	5	0	0	5
5	DF	(Scotland)	John Souttar	4	0	0	4
5	MF	(Scotland)	Gary Mackay-Steven	2	2	0	4
6	MF	(England)	Ben Woodburn	3	0	0	3
6	DF	(England)	Alex Cochrane	2	0	1	3
6	MF	(Republic of Ireland)	Aaron McEneff	1	1	1	3
6	MF	(Austria)	Peter Haring	1	0	2	3
7	DF	(Northern Ireland)	Michael Smith	2	0	0	2
7	MF	(Scotland)	Barrie McKay	2	0	0	2
7	DF	(Scotland)	Craig Halkett	1	1	0	2
7	MF	(Scotland)	Jamie Walker	1	1	0	2
7	MF	(Democratic Republic of the Congo)	Beni Baningime	1	0	1	2
8	DF	(Ivory Coast)	Armand Gnanduillet	1	0	0	1
8	DF	(Australia)	Nathaniel Atkinson	1	0	0	1
8	MF	(Australia)	Cameron Devlin	1	0	0	1
8	MF	(Scotland)	Finlay Pollock	0	1	0	1
Total				53	11	11	75

=== Assists ===
Last updated 14 May 2021

Place	Position	Nation	Name	Premiership	League Cup	Scottish Cup	Total
1	MF	(Scotland)	Barrie McKay	10	0	2	12
2	MF	(Scotland)	Gary Mackay-Steven	4	1	0	5
2	FW	(Northern Ireland)	Liam Boyce	3	1	1	5
3	DF	(England)	Alex Cochrane	2	1	0	3
3	MF	(England)	Josh Ginnelly	2	1	0	3
4	MF	(Australia)	Cameron Devlin	2	0	0	2
4	MF	(Austria)	Peter Haring	2	0	0	2
4	DF	(Northern Ireland)	Michael Smith	1	1	0	2
4	DF	(Australia)	Nathaniel Atkinson	1	0	1	2
4	MF	(Wales)	Ben Woodburn	1	0	1	2
4	MF	(Scotland)	Andy Halliday	0	1	1	2
4	MF	(Republic of Ireland)	Aaron McEneff	0	0	2	2
5	MF	(Democratic Republic of the Congo)	Beni Baningime	1	0	0	1
5	DF	(England)	Taylor Moore	1	0	0	1
5	DF	(Scotland)	Stephen Kingsley	0	1	0	1
5	FW	(England)	Ellis Simms	1	0	0	0
Total				32	7	8	47

=== Clean sheets ===
R	Pos	Nat	Name	Premiership	League Cup	Scottish Cup	Total
1	GK	(Scotland)	Craig Gordon	14	4	2	20
Total				14	4	2	20

Last updated: 30 April
Source: Match reports in Competitive matches

== Team statistics ==
=== League table ===
Pos	Team	Pld	W	D	L	GF	GA	GD	Pts	Qualification or relegation (Note: Teams play each other three times (33 matches), before the league is split into two groups (the top six and the bottom six).)
1	Celtic (C)	38	29	6	3	92	22	+70	93	Qualification for the Champions League group stage
2	Rangers	38	27	8	3	80	31	+49	89	Qualification for the Champions League third qualifying round
3	Heart of Midlothian	38	17	10	11	54	44	+10	61	Qualification for the Europa League play-off round
4	Dundee United	38	12	12	14	37	44	−7	48	Qualification for the Europa Conference League third qualifying round
5	Motherwell	38	12	10	16	42	61	−19	46	Qualification for the Europa Conference League second qualifying round

Rules for classification: 1) Points; 2) Goal difference; 3) Goals scored; 4) Head-to-head points; 5) Head-to-Head goal difference; 6) Play-off (only if deciding champion, UEFA competitions qualification, second stage group allocation or relegation).
(C) Champions

==== League Cup table ====
Pos	Team	Pld	W	PW	PL	L	GF	GA	GD	Pts	Qualification	HOM	STI	INV	COV	PET
1	Heart of Midlothian	4	4	0	0	0	8	0	+8	12	Qualification for the second round	—	—	1–0	3–0	—
2	Stirling Albion	4	2	1	0	1	8	7	+1	8		0–2	—	—	—	3–1
3	Inverness Caledonian Thistle	4	1	0	1	2	5	6	−1	4		—	2–2p	—	—	2–0
4	Cove Rangers	4	1	0	0	3	6	10	−4	3		—	2–3	3–1	—	—
5	Peterhead	4	1	0	0	3	4	8	−4	3		0–2	—	—	3–1	—

Rules for classification: 1) goal difference, 2) goals scored, 3) away goals scored, 4) matches won, 5) away matches won, 6) drawing of lots.

=== Division summary ===
Round	1	2	3	4	5	6	7	8	9	10	11	12	13	14	15	16	17	18	19	20	21	22	23	24	25	26	27	28	29	30	31	32	33	34	35	36	37	38
Ground	H	A	H	A	H	A	H	H	A	H	A	A	H	A	H	A	A	H	A	H	H	H	H	A	A	H	A	A	H	A	H	A	H	A	H	A	A	H
Result	W	W	D	W	D	D	W	W	D	D	D	L	W	L	W	L	W	L	W	W	W	L	W	D	L	L	L	W	W	D	W	D	W	W	D	L	L	L
Position	2	1	2	2	3	3	2	1	2	1	3	3	2	3	2	3	3	3	3	3	3	3	3	3	3	3	3	3	3	3	3	3	3	3	3	3	3	3

Updated to match(es) played on 14 May 2022. Source:
A = Away; H = Home; W = Win; D = Draw; L = Loss

=== Management statistics ===
Last updated 22 May 2022

Name	From	To	P	W	D	L	Win% (Note: Win% is the percentage of matches won rounded to two decimal places.)
Robbie Neilson	10 July 2021	Present	48	25	10	13	52.08

== Club ==
=== International selection ===
Over the course of the season a number of the Hearts squad were called up on international duty. Craig Gordon, John Souttar and Craig Halkett were called up to represent Scotland, whilst Michael Smith was selected to represent Northern Ireland and Ben Woodburn to represent Wales. Nathaniel Atkinson was later called up to represent Australia.

== Transfers ==
=== Players in ===
Player	From	Fee
(Scotland) Ross Stewart	(Scotland) Livingston	Free
(England) Josh Ginnelly	(England) Preston North End	Free
(Democratic Republic of the Congo) Beni Baningime	(England) Everton	Free
(Australia) Cameron Devlin	(Australia) Newcastle Jets	Undisclosed Fee
(Scotland) Barrie McKay	Unattached	Free
(Australia) Nathaniel Atkinson	(Australia) Melbourne City	Undisclosed Fee
(England) Toby Sibbick	(England) Barnsley	Undisclosed Fee

=== Players out ===
Player	To	Fee
(Scotland) Craig Wighton	(Scotland) Dunfermline Athletic	Free
(Scotland) Christophe Berra	(Scotland) Raith Rovers	Free
(Scotland) Harry Cochrane	(Scotland) Queen of the South	Training compensation
(Republic of Ireland) Colin Doyle	(Scotland) Kilmarnock	Free
(England) Elliott Frear	(England) Bath City	Free
(England) Olly Lee	(England) Gillingham	Free
(Scotland) Leeroy Makarova		Free
(Scotland) Lewis Moore	(Scotland) Queens Park	Free
(Scotland) Sean Ward		Free
(Republic of Ireland) Aidy White	(England) Rochdale	Free
(Czech Republic) Zdeněk Zlámal		Free
(Scotland) Steven Naismith	Retired	
(Scotland) Andy Irving	(Germany) Türkgücü München	Training compensation
(England) Jordan Roberts	(Scotland) Motherwell	Free
(Ivory Coast) Armand Gnanduillet	(France) Le Mans	Free

=== Loans in ===
Player	From	Fee
(England) Alex Cochrane	(England) Brighton & Hove Albion	Loan
(Wales) Ben Woodburn	(England) Liverpool	Loan
(England) Taylor Moore	(England) Bristol City	Loan
(England) Ellis Simms	(England) Everton	Loan

=== Loans out ===
Player	From	Fee
(Scotland) Harry Stone	(Scotland) Partick Thistle	Loan
(Scotland) Sean Docherty	(Scotland) Brechin City	Loan
(Scotland) Chris Hamilton	(Scotland) Arbroath	Loan
(Scotland) Scott McGill	(Scotland) Airdrie	Loan
(France) Loïc Damour	(France) Le Mans	Loan
(Scotland) Ryan Schiavone	(Scotland) Dumbarton	Loan
(Scotland) Connor Smith	(Scotland) Queens Park	Loan
(Romania) Mihai Popescu	(Scotland) Hamilton Academical	Loan
(England) Jordan Roberts	(Scotland) Motherwell	Loan
(Scotland) Euan Henderson	(Scotland) Alloa Athletic	Loan
(Scotland) Leo Watson	(Scotland) Stirling Albion	Loan
(Scotland) Cammy Logan	(Scotland) Edinburgh City	Loan
(Scotland) Jamie Brandon	(Scotland) Greenock Morton	Loan
(Scotland) Jamie Walker	(England) Bradford City	Loan
(Scotland) Leo Watson	(Scotland) East Fife	Loan
(Scotland) Harry Stone	(Scotland) Albion Rovers	Loan
(Scotland) Euan Henderson	(Scotland) Alloa Athletic	Loan
(Scotland) Finlay Pollock	(Scotland) East Fife	Loan
(Scotland) Liam McFarlane	(Scotland) Montrose	Emergency Loan

== Contract extensions ==
The following players extended their contracts with the club over the course of the season.

Date	Player	Length	Previous Expiry	Expiry
31 December 2021	(Scotland) Craig Gordon	2.5 years	May 2022	Summer 2024
11 January 2022	(Scotland) Craig Halkett	2.5 years	June 2022	Summer 2024
13 January 2022	(Scotland) Stephen Kingsley	3.5 years	June 2022	Summer 2025
14 January 2022	(Northern Ireland) Michael Smith	1 year	June 2022	Summer 2023
3 February 2022	(Scotland) Euan Henderson	1 year	June 2022	Summer 2023
28 February 2022	(Scotland) Andy Halliday	2 years	June 2022	Summer 2024
1 March 2022	(Scotland) Scott McGill	1 year	June 2022	Summer 2023
8 April 2022	(Scotland) Barrie McKay	3 years	June 2022	Summer 2025
26 April 2022	(Scotland) Arron Darge	1 year	June 2022	Summer 2023
26 April 2022	(Scotland) Aidan Denholm	1 year	June 2022	Summer 2023
13 May 2022	(Northern Ireland) Makenzie Kirk	1 year	June 2022	Summer 2023
13 May 2022	(Scotland) Murray Thomas	1 year	June 2022	Summer 2023

== See also ==
- List of Heart of Midlothian F.C. seasons
