= Beni Baningime =

Congolese footballer (born 1998)

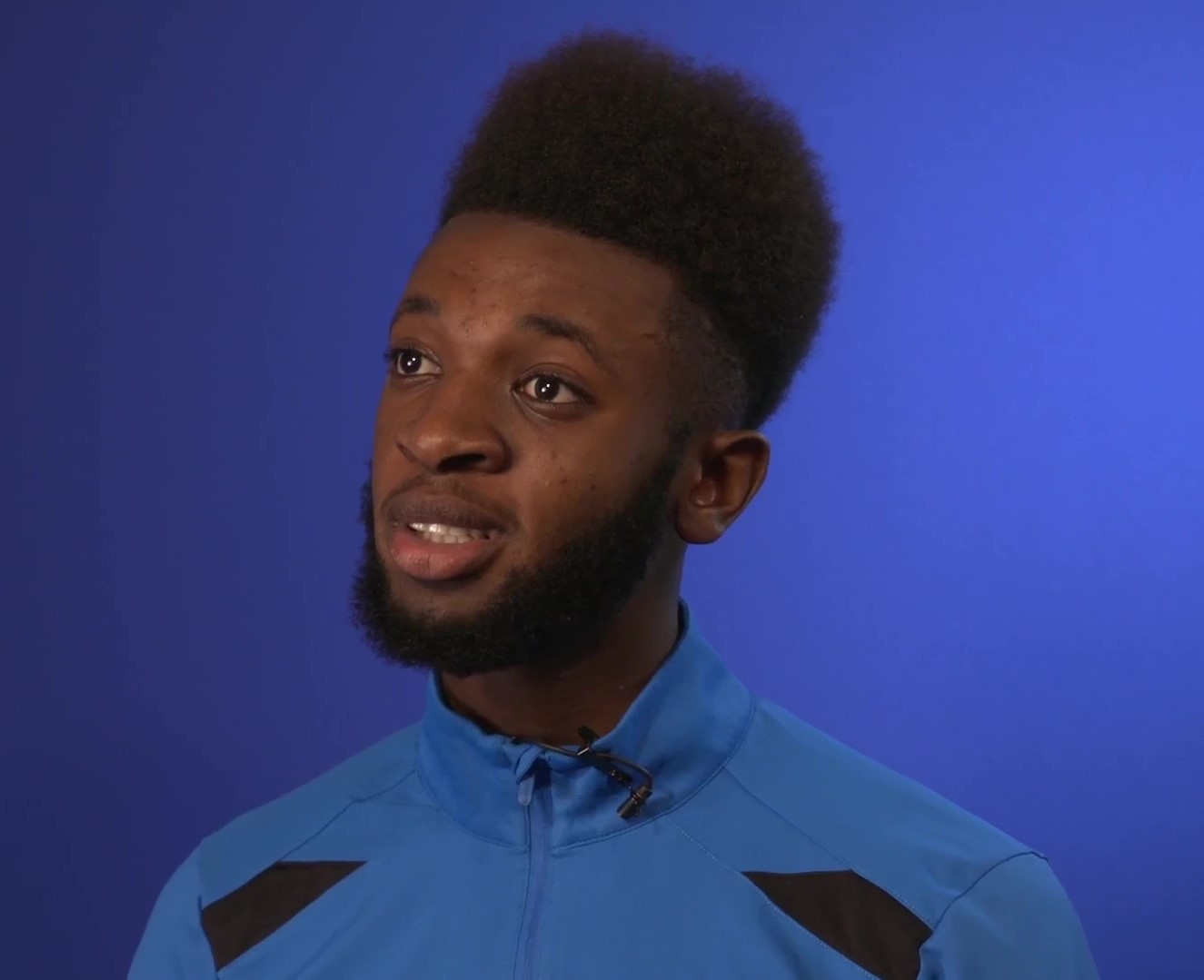
- Baningime with Everton, 2017

Personal information
- Full name: Beni Tangama Baningime
- Date of birth: 9 September 1998 (age 28)
- Place of birth: Kinshasa, DR Congo
- Height: 1.78 m (5 ft 10 in)
- Position: Central midfielder

Youth career
- 2007–2017: Everton

Senior career*
Years	Team	Apps	(Gls)
2017–2021	Everton	8	(0)
2019	→ Wigan Athletic (loan)	1	(0)
2021	→ Derby County (loan)	2	(0)
2021–2026	Heart of Midlothian	107	(1)
- * Club domestic league appearances and goals as of 17 May 2026

Beni Tangama Baningime (born 9 September 1998) is a Congolese professional footballer who last played for Scottish Premiership club Heart of Midlothian. Baningime moved to the UK when he was eight, where he began his career with Everton. He made his professional debut in 2017, before spells with Wigan Athletic, Derby County and Scottish Premiership side Heart of Midlothian.

== Early life ==
Baningime grew up in the Lemba district of Kinshasa. He left at the age of 8, after his father, who was working as a doctor in England, moved the family to Wigan.

== Career ==
=== Everton ===
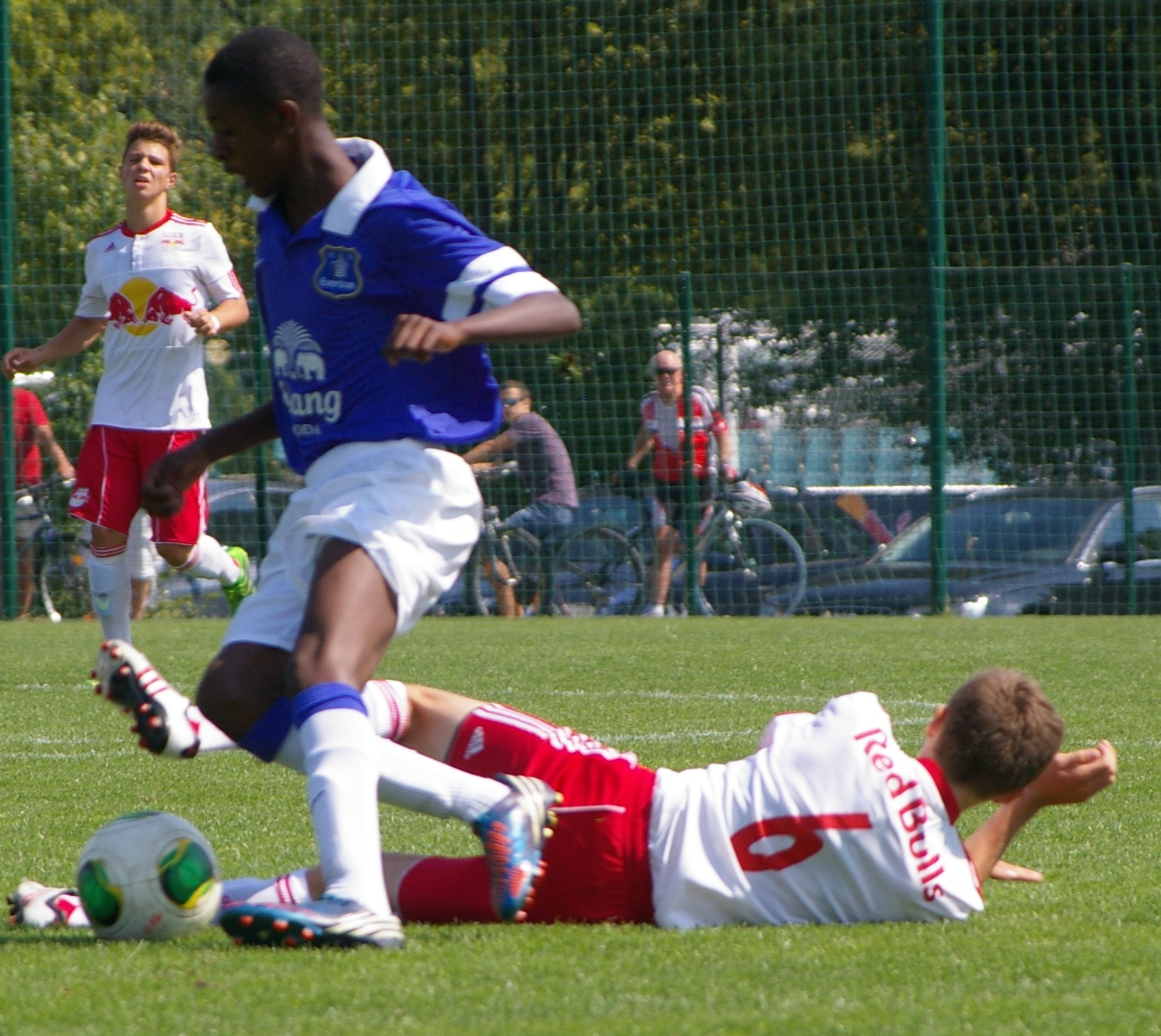
Baningime (left) playing for Everton in 2013.

Baningime joined Everton at the age of nine. He is an academy graduate of the club and won honours such as 'The Premier League 2' and the Dallas Cup during his time in the Everton F.C. Reserves and Academy. Baningime also won the Everton F.C. Reserves and Academy Player of the Year award for the 2016/17 season. Baningime's senior debut came in a League Cup game against Chelsea in October 2017. Baningime made his Premier League debut as a half-time substitute against Leicester City on 29 October 2017.

In January 2019, he was loaned to Wigan Athletic until the end of the season.

On 1 February 2021, Baningime joined Championship side Derby County on loan for the remainder of the 2020−21 season, reuniting with former Everton teammate Wayne Rooney who is manager. Two days later, he made his debut for the Rams as a substitute for Graeme Shinnie in a 0–3 away league defeat by Rotherham United.

=== Hearts ===
On 29 July 2021, Baningime joined Scottish Professional Football League club Heart of Midlothian for a nominal fee and signed a three-year deal. Baningime played his debut for Hearts in a 2–1 home win against Celtic, playing the full match and receiving the Man of the Match award. After 127 appearance's for Hearts, Baningime left the club at the end of the 2025/26 season.

== Personal life ==
Baningime's younger brother Divin Baningime is also a footballer, who most recently played for Wigan Athletic.

Baningime is a Christian. He prays before every match, and reads the Bible.

== Career statistics ==
As of 17 May 2026

Appearances and goals by club, season and competition
Club	Season	League			FA Cup		League Cup		Other		Total	
Club	Season	Division	Apps	Goals	Apps	Goals	Apps	Goals	Apps	Goals	Apps	Goals
Everton	2017–18	Premier League	8	0	0	0	1	0	3 (Note: Appearance(s) in UEFA Europa League)	0	12	0
Everton	2018–19	Premier League	0	0	0	0	0	0	0	0	0	0
Everton	2019–20	Premier League	0	0	0	0	0	0	0	0	0	0
Everton	2020–21	Premier League	0	0	0	0	0	0	0	0	0	0
Everton	Total		8	0	0	0	1	0	3	0	12	0
Wigan Athletic (loan)	2018–19	Championship	1	0	0	0	0	0	0	0	1	0
Derby County (loan)	2020–21	Championship	2	0	0	0	0	0	0	0	2	0
Heart of Midlothian	2021–22	Scottish Premiership	24	1	2	1	1	0	0	0	27	2
Heart of Midlothian	2022–23	Scottish Premiership	0	0	0	0	0	0	0	0	0	0
Heart of Midlothian	2023–24	Scottish Premiership	29	0	4	0	2	0	1	0	36	0
Heart of Midlothian	2024–25	Scottish Premiership	28	0	4	0	0	0	2	0	34	0
Heart of Midlothian	2025–26	Scottish Premiership	26	0	1	0	3	0	0	0	30	0
Heart of Midlothian	Total		107	1	11	1	6	0	3	0	127	2
Career total			118	1	11	1	7	0	6	0	142	2
