= Finlay Pollock =

Scottish association football player (born 2004)

Personal information
- Full name: Finlay Ian Pollock
- Date of birth: 27 June 2004 (age 22)
- Place of birth: Edinburgh, Scotland
- Height: 1.78 m (5 ft 10 in)
- Position: Midfielder

Team information
- Current team: Heart of Midlothian
- Number: 33

Youth career
- 2021–2024: Heart of Midlothian

Senior career*
| Years | Team | Apps | (Gls) |
| 2021– | Heart of Midlothian | 3 | (0) |
| 2022 | → East Fife (loan) | 7 | (0) |
| 2024–2025 | → Raith Rovers (loan) | 20 | (6) |

International career^{‡}
| 2022 | Scotland U19 | 6 | (0) |
| 2025– | Scotland U21 | 1 | (0) |
- * Club domestic league appearances and goals as of 14 March 2025 ‡ National team caps and goals as of 28 October 2024

Finlay Ian Pollock (born 27 June 2004) is a Scottish professional footballer who plays for Heart of Midlothian, as a midfielder. Born in Edinburgh, he began his career as a youth with local side Heart of Midlothian, and represented the club with Hearts B in the Lowland league as well as the first team.

He has also played for East Fife and Raith Rovers on loan and represented Scotland at under 19 and under 21 level.

== Club career ==
Born in Edinburgh, Pollock grew up a fan of Heart of Midlothian F.C. and attended Stewart's Melville College; he simultaneously was part of the Hearts Academy and latterly the B team in the Lowland League. He signed his first professional contract during the summer of 2021, having made his first team debut on 24 April 2021, against Inverness Caledonian Thistle in a 3–0 win. With the season drawing to a close he made one more appearance, as Hearts won the Scottish Championship.

The following season he scored his first goal for the club, scoring the winning goal against Stirling Albion in the Scottish League Cup. In October 2022, Pollock signed a new three-year contract. In all he made four appearances, before going on Loan to East Fife.

He made his next appearance for the first team in November 2022, as a substitute against Başakşehir in the UEFA Conference League. Subsequently, a diagnosis of patellar tendonitis and ongoing rehabilitation led him to be absent from the first team for over a year. His next appearance came in February 2024, in a 1–1 draw in the Edinburgh Derby against Hibernian.

In September 2024, Pollock signed a new two-year contract, before going on loan to Raith Rovers.

=== East Fife ===
On 28 February 2022, Pollock joined League One side East Fife for the remainder of the season. He made his debut on 12 March 2022, against Dumbarton, in a 2–0 win. In all he made seven appearances for East Fife.

=== Raith Rovers ===
On 9 September 2024, Pollock joined Scottish Championship side Raith Rovers on a season long loan. He made his debut on 21 September, against Hamilton Academical, scoring the second goal in a 3–3 draw.

== Career stats ==
As of 14 March 2025

Appearances and goals by club, season and competition
| Club | Season | League | | | FA Cup | | League Cup | | Europe | | Total | |
| Club | Season | Division | Apps | Goals | Apps | Goals | Apps | Goals | Apps | Goals | Apps | Goals |
|---|---|---|---|---|---|---|---|---|---|---|---|---|
| Heart of Midlothian | 2020–21 | Scottish Championship | 2 | 0 | 0 | 0 | 0 | 0 | 0 | 0 | 2 | 0 |
| Heart of Midlothian | 2021–22 | Scottish Premiership | 0 | 0 | 0 | 0 | 4 | 1 | 0 | 0 | 4 | 1 |
| Heart of Midlothian | 2022–23 | Scottish Premiership | 0 | 0 | 0 | 0 | 0 | 0 | 1 | 0 | 1 | 0 |
| Heart of Midlothian | 2023–24 | Scottish Premiership | 1 | 0 | 0 | 0 | 0 | 0 | 0 | 0 | 1 | 0 |
| Heart of Midlothian | 2024–25 | Scottish Premiership | 0 | 0 | 0 | 0 | 0 | 0 | 0 | 0 | 0 | 0 |
| Total | | | 3 | 0 | 0 | 0 | 4 | 1 | 1 | 0 | 8 | 1 |
East Fife
| East Fife | 2021–22 | League One | 7 | 0 | 0 | 0 | 0 | 0 | 0 | 0 | 7 | 0 |
| Total | | | 7 | 0 | 0 | 0 | 0 | 0 | 0 | 0 | 7 | 0 |
Raith Rovers
| Raith Rovers | 2024–25 | Scottish Championship | 20 | 6 | 2 | 0 | 0 | 0 | 0 | 0 | 22 | 6 |
| Total | | | 20 | 6 | 2 | 0 | 0 | 0 | 0 | 0 | 22 | 6 |
| Career total | | | 30 | 6 | 2 | 0 | 4 | 1 | 1 | 0 | 37 | 7 |
