= Boris Mathis =

French footballer (born 1997)

Personal information
- Full name: Boris Mathis
- Date of birth: 15 August 1997 (age 29)
- Place of birth: Bron, France
- Position: Forward

Team information
- Current team: FC Chalon

Youth career
- 2013–2015: Lyon
- 2015–2017: Metz

Senior career*
Years	Team	Apps	(Gls)
2016–2017	Metz II	25	(5)
2017	Metz	2	(0)
2017–2019	Everton	0	(0)
2018	→ Northampton Town (loan)	5	(0)
2019–2020	Rodez II	8	(5)
2019–2021	Rodez	4	(0)
2020	→ Villefranche (loan)	3	(0)
2021–2022	Guingamp II	4	(1)
2023–	FC Chalon		
- * Club domestic league appearances and goals as of 1 July 2023

Boris Mathis (born 15 August 1997) is a French professional footballer who plays as a forward for FC Chalon.

== Career ==
Mathis is a youth product of Lyon. Mathis made his professional debut for Metz in a 3–0 Ligue 1 loss against Lyon on 5 April 2017. He left Metz at the end of 2016–17 before signing a two-year deal with English club Everton in July 2017, where he joined the team's Under 23 squad. He moved on loan to Northampton Town in January 2018. In July 2019, Mathis joined newly promoted Ligue 2 side Rodez following his release from Everton. On 30 January 2020, Mathis joined Championnat National side Villefranche on loan until the end of the season.

On 1 July 2021, Mathis signed for the reserve side of Guingamp of the Championnat National 2. In July 2023, he moved to FC Chalon.
