= List of Scottish football transfers winter 2023–24 =

This is a list of Scottish football transfers featuring at least one 2023–24 Scottish Premiership club or one 2023–24 Scottish Championship club which were completed after the summer 2023 transfer window closed and before the end of the 2023–24 season.

== List ==
Date	Name	Moving from	Moving to	Fee
4 September 2023	Jordy Hiwula	Ross County	Morecambe	Free
5 September 2023	Albian Ajeti	Celtic	Gaziantep	Undisclosed
5 September 2023	Dylan McGowan	Kilmarnock	Hamilton Academical	Free
7 September 2023	Jordan Tillson	Ross County	Dundee United	Loan
8 September 2023	Alex Jakubiak	Dundee	Dunfermline Athletic	Free
11 September 2023	Joseph Efford	Motherwell	PAS Giannina	Free
12 September 2023	Anton Dowds	Partick Thistle	Ayr United	Loan
12 September 2023	Darren Lyon	Kelty Hearts	Arbroath	Free
14 September 2023	Ethan Ross	Raith Rovers	Falkirk	Loan
14 September 2023	Rory MacLeod	Dundee United	Forfar Athletic	Loan
21 September 2023	Kanayo Megwa	Hibernian	Airdrieonians	Loan
23 September 2023	Alfie Bavidge	Aberdeen	Kelty Hearts	Loan
29 September 2023	Mark Ferrie	Motherwell	Stenhousemuir	Loan
29 September 2023	Ewan Wilson	Motherwell	Stirling Albion	Loan
29 September 2023	Jack Harkness	Rangers	Greenock Morton	Loan
29 September 2023	Bobby Wales	Kilmarnock	Alloa Athletic	Loan
29 September 2023	Bryan Mwangi	Dundee United	The Spartans	Loan
29 September 2023	Taylor Sutherland	Dunfermline Athletic	Bonnyrigg Rose	Loan
30 September 2023	Nathan McGinley	Motherwell	Partick Thistle	Loan
3 October 2023	Stuart McKinstry	Leeds United	Queen's Park	Free
4 October 2023	Scott Bright	St Johnstone	Berwick Rangers	Loan
4 October 2023	Joe Ellison	St Johnstone	Berwick Rangers	Loan
6 October 2023	Liam Parker	St Johnstone	Civil Service Strollers	Loan
17 October 2023	David Wotherspoon	St Johnstone	Inverness Caledonian Thistle	Free
26 October 2023	Cillian Sheridan	Dundee	Inverness Caledonian Thistle	Free
3 November 2023	Joaõ Baldé	Arbroath	East Kilbride	Loan
20 November 2023	Daniel O'Reilly	Hamilton Academical	Raith Rovers	Free
5 December 2023	Gary Mackay-Steven	Heart of Midlothian	Kilmarnock	Free
13 December 2023	Elvis Bwomono	IBV	St Mirren	Free
21 December 2023	Innes Murray	Edinburgh City	Arbroath	Free
24 December 2023	Kyle Thomson	St Johnstone	Brechin City	Loan
1 January 2024	Elias Melkersen	Hibernian	Strømsgodset	£1.2 million
1 January 2024	Shaun Donnellan	Torquay United	Livingston	Free
1 January 2024	Fábio Silva	Wolverhampton Wanderers	Rangers	Loan
1 January 2024	Tete Yengi	Ipswich Town	Livingston	Free
1 January 2024	Dara Costelloe	Burnley	Dundee	Loan
1 January 2024	Danny Lloyd	Livingston	Southport	Free
1 January 2024	Wes McDonald	Partick Thistle	Free agent	Free
1 January 2024	Pape Souaré	Motherwell	Free agent	Free
1 January 2024	Luke McBeth	Glenafton Athletic	Partick Thistle	Undisclosed
2 January 2024	Benjamin Mbunga Kimpioka	AIK	St Johnstone	Free
2 January 2024	Kerr Smith	Aston Villa	St Johnstone	Loan
3 January 2024	Malik Zaid	Hibernian	Edinburgh City	Loan
3 January 2024	Luiyi de Lucas	Livingston	AEL Limassol	Free
3 January 2024	Conor Wilkinson	Motherwell	Colchester United	Undisclosed
4 January 2024	Sam Campbell	Motherwell	Free agent	Free
4 January 2024	Ben Williamson	Rangers	Hamilton Academical	Undisclosed
5 January 2024	Finn Ecrepont	Ayr United	Stranraer	Free
5 January 2024	Gordon Walker	Cork City	Arbroath	Free
5 January 2024	Makenzie Kirk	Heart of Midlothian	Hamilton Academical	Loan
5 January 2024	Reuben McAllister	Hibernian	Kelty Hearts	Loan
6 January 2024	Ross Stewart	Heart of Midlothian	Partick Thistle	Free
6 January 2024	Ruairidh Adams	Dundee United	Edinburgh City	Loan
8 January 2024	Tom Parkes	Livingston	Hartlepool United	Free
8 January 2024	Peter Pawlett	Dundee United	Peterhead	Free
9 January 2024	Yosuke Ideguchi	Celtic	Vissel Kobe	£870,000
9 January 2024	David Keltjens	Hapoel Tel Aviv	St Johnstone	Free
9 January 2024	Daniel O'Reilly	Raith Rovers	Partick Thistle	Free
9 January 2024	Kieran Offord	St Mirren	Stirling Albion	Loan
9 January 2024	Alex Greive	St Mirren	Dundee United	Loan
10 January 2024	Sam Lammers	Rangers	FC Utrecht	Loan
10 January 2024	James Carragher	Wigan Athletic	Inverness Caledonian Thistle	Loan
10 January 2024	Kyle Turner	Ross County	Raith Rovers	Loan
11 January 2024	Callum Flatman	Heart of Midlothian	Edinburgh City	Loan
11 January 2024	Ben Purrington	Ross County	Exeter City	Undisclosed
11 January 2024	George Wickens	Fulham	Ross County	Loan
12 January 2024	Dexter Lembikisa	Wolverhampton Wanderers	Heart of Midlothian	Loan
12 January 2024	Kwon Hyeok-kyu	Celtic	St Mirren	Loan
12 January 2024	Jayden Richardson	Aberdeen	Colchester United	Loan
12 January 2024	Adam Mackinnon	Ross County	Arbroath	Loan
12 January 2024	Zak Delaney	Inverness Caledonian Thistle	Arbroath	Free
12 January 2024	Kyle Robinson	Drogheda United	Arbroath	Free
12 January 2024	Malachi Fagan-Walcott	Cardiff City	Dunfermline Athletic	Loan
12 January 2024	Brandon Khela	Birmingham City	Ross County	Loan
12 January 2024	Liam Harvey	Aberdeen	Buckie Thistle	Free
13 January 2024	Sean Welsh	Inverness Caledonian Thistle	Queen's Park	Free
13 January 2024	Tom Welsh	Dundee	Arbroath	Loan
13 January 2024	Mason McCready	Partick Thistle	The Spartans	Loan
15 January 2024	David Wotherspoon	Inverness Caledonian Thistle	Dundee United	Free
15 January 2024	Eli King	Cardiff City	Ross County	Loan
15 January 2024	Adam Montgomery	Celtic	Motherwell	Loan
16 January 2024	Nicolas Kühn	Rapid Vienna	Celtic	£3 million
17 January 2024	Curtis Main	Bengaluru	Dundee	Free
18 January 2024	Gallagher Lennon	St Mirren	Dumbarton	Loan
18 January 2024	MacKenzie Carse	Celtic	Queen's Park	Loan
18 January 2024	Callum Haspell	Rothes	Queen's Park	Free
18 January 2024	Myziane Maolida	Hertha BSC	Hibernian	Loan
18 January 2024	Ryan Astley	Everton	Dundee	Undisclosed
18 January 2024	Cameron Borthwick-Jackson	Śląsk Wrocław	Ross County	Loan
18 January 2024	Greg Stewart	Mumbai City	Kilmarnock	Free
19 January 2024	Scott Bitsindou	Livingston	Free agent	Loan
19 January 2024	Andy Halliday	Heart of Midlothian	Motherwell	Loan
19 January 2024	Michael McGovern	Heart of Midlothian	Livingston	Loan
19 January 2024	Alex Samuel	Ross County	Inverness Caledonian Thistle	Loan
19 January 2024	Owen Dodgson	Burnley	Dundee	Loan
19 January 2024	Flynn Duffy	Dundee United	Peterhead	Loan
20 January 2024	Mark Birighitti	Dundee United	Kilmarnock	Loan
22 January 2024	Dylan Tait	Hibernian	Falkirk	Loan
22 January 2024	Emiliano Marcondes	Bournemouth	Hibernian	Loan
22 January 2024	Callan Elliot	Wellington Phoenix	Motherwell	Free
23 January 2024	EJ Johnson	Hibernian	Free agent	Free
23 January 2024	Allan Delferrière	Hibernian	Vyškov	Loan
23 January 2024	Max Boruc	Hibernian	Arbroath	Loan
23 January 2024	Riley Harbottle	Hibernian	Colchester United	Loan
23 January 2024	Sam Nicholson	Colorado Rapids	Motherwell	Free
24 January 2024	Luke Amos	Queens Park Rangers	Hibernian	Free
24 January 2024	James Scott	Exeter City	St Mirren	Loan
24 January 2024	Ryan MacLeman	Ross County	Elgin City	Free
24 January 2024	Ross Munro	Ross County	Dundalk	Undisclosed
24 January 2024	James Balagizi	Liverpool	Kilmarnock	Loan
25 January 2024	Jeremiah Chilokoa-Mullen	Leeds United	Inverness Caledonian Thistle	Loan
25 January 2024	Vicente Besuijen	Aberdeen	FC Emmen	Loan
25 January 2024	Steven Davis	Rangers	Retired	Free
25 January 2024	Loick Ayina	Huddersfield Town	Ross County	Loan
25 January 2024	Teddy Jenks	Forest Green Rovers	Ross County	Loan
25 January 2024	Luke Jephcott	St Johnstone	Newport County	Free
25 January 2024	Cammy Kerr	Dundee	Inverness Caledonian Thistle	Loan
26 January 2024	Mohamed Diomande	Nordsjaelland	Rangers	Loan
26 January 2024	Dylan Bahamboula	Livingston	Free agent	Free
26 January 2024	Jacques Heraghty	Queen's Park	Annan Athletic	Loan
26 January 2024	Michael Mellon	Burnley	Dundee	Loan
26 January 2024	Zak Rudden	Dundee	Raith Rovers	Loan
26 January 2024	Jamie Gullan	Raith Rovers	Dundalk	Undisclosed
26 January 2024	Jaden Brown	Lincoln City	St Mirren	Loan
26 January 2024	Jack Sanders	Kilmarnock	Ayr United	Loan
26 January 2024	Connor Smith	Heart of Midlothian	St Johnstone	Free
27 January 2024	Nathan Moriah-Welsh	Bournemouth	Hibernian	Undisclosed
28 January 2024	Killian Phillips	Crystal Palace	Aberdeen	Loan
30 January 2024	Owen Beck	Liverpool	Dundee	Loan
30 January 2024	Aaron Healey	Queen's Park	Dumbarton	Loan
30 January 2024	Jimmy Jeggo	Hibernian	Melbourne City	Free
30 January 2024	Brad Holmes	Blackpool	Dunfermline Athletic	Loan
31 January 2024	Jack Spong	Queen's Park	Worthing	Free
31 January 2024	Christian Doidge	Hibernian	Forest Green Rovers	Undisclosed
31 January 2024	Scott Fraser	Charlton Athletic	Heart of Midlothian	Loan
1 February 2024	Danny Wilson	Colorado Rapids	Queen's Park	Free
1 February 2024	Xavier Benjamin	Cardiff City	Dunfermline Athletic	Loan
1 February 2024	Jon McCracken	Norwich City	Dundee	Loan
1 February 2024	David Carson	Inverness Caledonian Thistle	Livingston	Free
1 February 2024	Connor Teale	Fleetwood Town	Arbroath	Loan
1 February 2024	Joaõ Baldé	Arbroath	East Kilbride	Undisclosed
1 February 2024	Nectarios Triantis	Sunderland	Hibernian	Loan
1 February 2024	Owen Bevan	Bournemouth	Hibernian	Loan
1 February 2024	Eliezer Mayenda	Sunderland	Hibernian	Loan
1 February 2024	Harry McKirdy	Hibernian	Swindon Town	Loan
1 February 2024	Oscar Cortes	Lens	Rangers	Loan
1 February 2024	Adam Devine	Rangers	Motherwell	Loan
1 February 2024	Jili Buyabu	Sheffield United	Motherwell	Loan
1 February 2024	Kevin van Veen	Groningen	Kilmarnock	Loan
1 February 2024	Mikey Johnston	Celtic	West Bromwich Albion	Loan
1 February 2024	Michee Efete	Grimsby Town	Ross County	Free
1 February 2024	Adama Sidibeh	Warrington Rylands	St Johnstone	Undisclosed
1 February 2024	Adam Idah	Norwich City	Celtic	Loan
1 February 2024	David Turnbull	Celtic	Cardiff City	£2 million
1 February 2024	Callan McKenna	Queen's Park	Bournemouth	£300,000
1 February 2024	Josh Scott	Newcastle United	Queen's Park	Free
1 February 2024	Jake Davidson	Inverness Caledonian Thistle	Hamilton Academical	Loan
1 February 2024	Robbie Thomson	Inverness Caledonian Thistle	The Spartans	Loan
1 February 2024	Aribim Pepple	Luton Town	Inverness Caledonian Thistle	Loan
1 February 2024	Sean McAllister	Everton	Inverness Caledonian Thistle	Loan
1 February 2024	Ahkeem Rose	Ayr United	Hamilton Academical	Loan
1 February 2024	Kurt Willoughby	Oldham Athletic	Ayr United	Loan
1 February 2024	Chris Donnell	Fulham	Airdrieonians	Loan
2 February 2024	Matthew Wright	Ross County	Brechin City	Loan
2 February 2024	Ji Stevenson	Partick Thistle	Cumnock Juniors	Loan
5 February 2024	Sam McClelland	St Johnstone	Dundee United	Loan
6 February 2024	Cammy Ballantyne	St Johnstone	Clyde	Loan
7 February 2024	José Cifuentes	Rangers	Cruzeiro	Loan
9 February 2024	James Brown	St Johnstone	Raith Rovers	Loan
13 February 2024	Chris Kane	St Johnstone	Dunfermline Athletic	Loan
15 February 2024	Oscar MacIntyre	Hibernian	Annan Athletic	Loan
16 February 2024	Junior Hoilett	Vancouver Whitecaps	Aberdeen	Free
16 February 2024	Josh Hinds	Hull City	Queen's Park	Free
19 February 2024	Pape Habib Guèye	Aberdeen	Kristiansund	Loan
21 February 2024	Lee Ashcroft	Dundee	Raith Rovers	Loan
21 February 2024	Kanayo Megwa	Hibernian	Airdrieonians	Loan
22 February 2024	Miles Welch-Hayes	Livingston	Dunfermline Athletic	Loan
22 February 2024	Cillian Sheridan	Inverness Caledonian Thistle	Queen's Park	Free
23 February 2024	Charlie Reilly	Dundee	Arbroath	Loan
24 February 2024	Josh Clarke	Celtic	Ayr United	Loan
28 February 2024	Jack Willis	St Johnstone	Queen's Park	Loan
28 February 2024	Rudi Molotnikov	Hibernian	Stirling Albion	Loan
29 February 2024	Jacob Blaney	Hibernian	East Fife	Loan
1 March 2024	Nathan McGinley	Motherwell	Ayr United	Free
1 March 2024	Samson Lawal	Livingston	Inverness Caledonian Thistle	Loan
7 March 2024	Liel Abada	Celtic	Charlotte FC	£8 million

== See also ==
- List of Scottish football transfers summer 2023
- List of Scottish football transfers summer 2024
