= 2023–24 Arbroath F.C. season =

Arbroath
2023–24 season
- Chairman: Mike Caird
- Manager: Dick Campbell (until 25 November); Jim McIntyre (from 4 December)
- Stadium: Gayfield Park
- Scottish Championship: Tenth place
- Scottish League Cup: Group stage
- Scottish Challenge Cup: Quarter-final
- Scottish Cup: Third round
- Top goalscorer: League: Jay Bird (7); All: Jay Bird (11)
- Highest home attendance: 5,558 vs. Dundee United, Championship, 4 August 2023
- Lowest home attendance: 780 vs. Inverness CT, Challenge Cup, 9 September 2023
- Average home league attendance: 1,972
Home colours	Away colours	Third colours

The 2023–24 season was Arbroath's fifth consecutive season in the Scottish Championship, following their promotion from Scottish League One in the 2018–19 season. They also competed in the Scottish League Cup, Scottish Challenge Cup and the Scottish Cup.

== Competitions ==
=== Pre-season and friendlies ===
Date	Opponent	Venue	Result (Note: Arbroath's score written first)	Scorers	Attendance	Ref.
24 June 2023	Brechin City	Away	1–1	Gold 51'	809	
1 July 2023	Montrose	Home	1–3	Little 50'		
8 July 2023	Stirling Albion	Away	2–1	Dow 45', Trialist 78'		
12 July 2023	Dundee	Home	0–1	Robinson 36'	2,160	
15 July 2023	Falkirk	Away	2–1	Bird 20', Baldé 60'		

=== Scottish Championship ===
Win	Draw	Loss

Date	Opponent	Venue	Result	Scorers	Attendance	Ref.
4 August 2023	Dundee United	Home	0–4		5,558	
12 August 2023	Queen's Park	Away	1–2	McIntosh 71'	916	
19 August 2023	Queen's Park	Home	0–1		1,477	
26 August 2023	Greenock Morton	Away	3–0	McKenna 20', Wilson 73' o.g., Baldé 90+4'	1,746	
2 September 2023	Ayr United	Home	2–1	Bird 21', Hylton 82'	1,643	
16 September 2023	Airdrieonians	Home	4–0	McKenna 2', Hylton 35', Bird 88', McIntosh 90+1'	1,708	
23 September 2023	Partick Thistle	Away	3–0	Hylton 12', 80', O'Brien 39'	3,159	
30 September 2023	Inverness Caledonian Thistle	Home	2–3	Stewart 69', McKenna 79'	1,723	
27 October 2023	Dundee United	Away	0–6		8,489	
4 November 2023	Partick Thistle	Home	1–3	Hylton 87'	1,753	
11 November 2023	Airdrieonians	Away	0–2		1,418	
28 November 2023	Dunfermline Athletic	Away	0–3		3,226	
9 December 2023	Greenock Morton	Home	1–2	Gold 61'	1,219	
13 December 2023	Raith Rovers	Home	1–2	Hylton 30' pen.	1,445	
16 December 2023	Inverness Caledonian Thistle	Away	1–2	Bird 29', Gold 42'	1,842	
23 December 2023	Dunfermline Athletic	Home	1–1	Bird 45+3'	1,910	
30 December 2023	Raith Rovers	Away	2–2	Adams 76', McIntosh 81 pen.'	3,806	
2 January 2024	Dundee United	Home	0–3		5,276	
6 January 2024	Partick Thistle	Away	0–4		3,481	
13 January 2024	Ayr United	Home	0–0		1,598	
23 January 2024	Ayr United	Away	0–2		1,115	
27 January 2024	Greenock Morton	Away	0–3		1,802	
17 February 2024	Dunfermline Athletic	Away	1–1	O'Brien 52'	4,743	
24 February 2024	Inverness Caledonian Thistle	Home	1–1	Mackinnon 82'	1,539	
27 February 2024	Queen's Park	Away	0–6		1,073	
1 March 2024	Raith Rovers	Home	3–2	Bird 61', 71', Stowe 77'	1,780	
9 March 2024	Dundee United	Away	0–4		7,676	
16 March 2024	Airdrieonians	Away	2–5	Dow 16', Gold 54'	1,403	
23 March 2024	Partick Thistle	Home	0–1		1,048	
30 March 2024	Dunfermline Athletic	Home	2–3	Stewart 54', 64'	2,139	
2 April 2024	Airdrieonians	Home	1–2	Bird 90+1'	1,043	
6 April 2024	Inverness Caledonian Thistle	Away	1–2	McIntosh 61'	2,223	
13 April 2024	Ayr United	Away	0–5		1,849	
20 April 2024	Greenock Morton	Home	1–2	McKenna 68'	1,299	
27 April 2024	Queen's Park	Home	0–5		1,322	
3 May 2024	Raith Rovers	Away	0–5		3,357	

=== Scottish League Cup ===
==== Group stage ====
Win	Draw	Loss

Date	Opponent	Venue	Result	Scorers	Attendance	Ref.
19 July 2023	Cowdenbeath	Home	1–1 (4–3 pen.)	McKenna 51' pen.	1,010	
22 July 2023	St Mirren	Away	0–4		2,059	
25 July 2023	Forfar Athletic	Away	1–3	Bird 41'	1,129	
29 July 2023	Montrose	Home	3–0	McIntosh 12', Dünnwald-Turan 70', Bird 79'	1,408	

=== Scottish Challenge Cup ===
Win	Draw	Loss

Round	Date	Opponent	Venue	Result	Scorers	Attendance	Ref.
Third round	9 September 2023	Inverness Caledonian Thistle	Home	4–2	Gold 34', O'Brien 41', Stewart 70', Steele 84'	780	
Fourth round	14 October 2023	Queen of the South	Away	2–1	Bird 54', McKenna 90'	786	
Quarter-final	18 November 2023	(Wales) The New Saints	Away	1–4	Bird 9'	587	

=== Scottish Cup ===
Win	Draw	Loss

Round	Date	Opponent	Venue	Result	Scorers	Attendance	Ref.
Third round	25 November 2023	The Spartans	Away	1–2	Gold 49'	647	

== Player statistics ==
=== Appearances and goals ===
As of 3 May 2024

No.	Pos	Player	Championship		League Cup		Challenge Cup		Scottish Cup		Total	
No.	Pos	Player	Apps	Goals	Apps	Goals	Apps	Goals	Apps	Goals	Apps	Goals
1	GK	(Scotland) Derek Gaston	23	0	4	0	1	0	1	0	29	0
2	DF	(Scotland) Aaron Steele	20+1	0	3	0	3	1	1	0	28	1
3	DF	(Scotland) Colin Hamilton	14+1	0	0	0	1	0	1	0	17	0
4	DF	(Scotland) Ricky Little	21+2	0	4	0	2	0	0	0	29	0
5	DF	(Scotland) Thomas O'Brien	19	2	2	0	2+1	1	1	0	25	3
6	MF	(Scotland) Craig Slater	25+5	0	3+1	0	1+1	0	1	0	37	0
7	MF	(Scotland) David Gold	32+1	3	3+1	0	3	1	1	1	41	5
8	MF	(Scotland) Michael McKenna	19+6	4	3	1	3	1	1	0	32	6
9	FW	(Scotland) Leighton McIntosh	23+10	4	1+3	1	0+2	0	0	0	39	5
10	MF	(South Africa) Keaghan Jacobs	4+9	0	1+2	0	1+1	0	0	0	18	0
11	MF	(Scotland) Ryan Dow	19+5	1	4	0	1+1	0	1	0	31	1
12	MF	(Scotland) Scott Stewart	36	3	4	3	1	0	1	0	42	6
14	FW	(Scotland) Mark Stowe	8+18	1	2+2	0	1+2	1	0+1	0	34	2
15	DF	(Republic of Ireland) Zak Delaney	9	0	0	0	0	0	0	0	9	0
16	MF	(England) Jess Norey	8+5	0	0+1	0	0+2	0	0	0	16	0
17	DF	(England) Connor Teale	9+2	0	0	0	0	0	0	0	11	0
18	MF	(Scotland) Adam Mackinnon	14+3	1	0	0	0	0	0	0	17	1
19	FW	(Republic of Ireland) Kyle Robinson	4+6	0	0	0	0	0	0	0	10	0
20	DF	(Republic of Ireland) Gordon Walker	7+2	0	0	0	0	0	0	0	9	0
21	GK	(Scotland) Ali Adams	1+1	1	0	0	2	0	0	0	4	1
22	MF	(Scotland) Innes Murray	8+4	0	0	0	0	0	0	0	12	0
25	FW	(Scotland) Charlie Reilly	4+1	0	0	0	0	0	0	0	5	0
26	MF	(Scotland) Darren Lyon	7+8	0	0	0	1	0	0	0	16	0
27	FW	(England) Jay Bird	23+10	7	4	2	2	2	1	0	40	11
41	GK	(Poland) Max Boruc	12+1	0	0	0	0	0	0	0	13	0
62	FW	(Germany) Kenan Dünnwald-Turan	5+14	0	1+3	1	2+1	0	1	0	27	1
Players who left the club during the 2023–24 season
23	MF	(Scotland) Scott Allan	0	0	1+2	0	0	0	0	0	3	0
24	FW	(England) Jermaine Hylton	15+2	6	1	0	2	0	1	0	21	6
25	MF	(Portugal) Joaõ Baldé	3+7	1	3+1	0	2	0	0	0	16	1

== Team statistics ==
=== League table ===
Pos	Team	Pld	W	D	L	GF	GA	GD	Pts	Promotion, qualification or relegation
6	Dunfermline Athletic	36	11	12	13	43	48	−5	45	
7	Ayr United	36	12	8	16	53	61	−8	44	
8	Queen's Park	36	11	10	15	50	56	−6	43	
9	Inverness Caledonian Thistle (R)	36	10	12	14	41	40	+1	42	Qualification for the Championship play-offs
10	Arbroath (R)	36	6	5	25	35	89	−54	23	Relegation to League One

Rules for classification: 1) Points; 2) Goal difference; 3) Goals scored; 4) Head-to-to head points; 5) Head-to-head goal difference; 6) Play-off (only for deciding promotion, play-off participation and relegation).
(R) Relegated

=== League Cup table ===
Pos	Team	Pld	W	PW	PL	L	GF	GA	GD	Pts	Qualification	STM	FOR	ARB	MON	COW
1	St Mirren	4	3	0	0	1	9	1	+8	9	Qualification for the second round	—	4–0	4–0	—	—
2	Forfar Athletic	4	3	0	0	1	6	6	0	9		—	—	3–1	—	1–0
3	Arbroath	4	1	1	0	2	5	8	−3	5		—	—	—	3–0	p1–1
4	Montrose	4	1	1	0	2	3	6	−3	5		1–0	1–2	—	—	—
5	Cowdenbeath	4	0	0	2	2	2	4	−2	2		0–1	—	—	1–1p	—

Rules for classification: 1) goal difference, 2) goals scored, 3) away goals scored, 4) matches won, 5) away matches won, 6) drawing of lots.

== Transfers ==
=== Transfers in ===
Date	Position	Name	From	Fee	Ref.
18 May 2023	MF	Craig Slater	Forfar Athletic	Free transfer	
22 May 2023	FW	Leighton McIntosh	Cove Rangers	Free transfer	
24 May 2023	DF	Aaron Steele	East Fife	Free transfer	
7 June 2023	GK	Ali Adams	Musselburgh Athletic	Free transfer	
16 June 2023	FW	Mark Stowe	Linlithgow Rose	Free transfer	
7 July 2023	MF	(Germany) Kenan Dünnwald-Turan	Free agent	Free transfer	
12 July 2023	MF	(England) Jess Norey	(England) Barking	Free transfer	
15 July 2023	FW	(England) Jay Bird	(England) Dagenham & Redbridge	Free transfer	
28 July 2023	FW	(England) Jermaine Hylton	Free agent	Free transfer	
12 September 2023	MF	Darren Lyon	Kelty Hearts	Free transfer	
21 December 2023	MF	Innes Murray	Edinburgh City	Free transfer	
5 January 2024	DF	(Republic of Ireland) Gordon Walker	(Republic of Ireland) Cork City	Free transfer	
12 January 2024	DF	(Republic of Ireland) Zak Delaney	Inverness Caledonian Thistle	Free transfer	
12 January 2024	FW	(Republic of Ireland) Kyle Robinson	(Republic of Ireland) Drogheda United	Free transfer	

=== Transfers out ===
Date	Position	Name	To	Fee	Ref.
17 May 2023	MF	Bobby Linn	Lochee United	Free transfer	
23 May 2023	FW	Kieran Shanks	Peterhead	Undisclosed	
25 May 2023	FW	(England) Sean Adarkwa	(England) Wealdstone	Free transfer	
25 May 2023	DF	(England) Lewis Banks	(England) Altrincham	Free transfer	
25 May 2023	MF	(England) Yasin Ben El-Mhanni		Free transfer	
25 May 2023	GK	Cammy Gill	Montrose	Free transfer	
25 May 2023	FW	Dale Hilson	Stirling Albion	Free transfer	
25 May 2023	FW	(Nigeria) Paul Komolafe		Free transfer	
25 May 2023	MF	Dylan Paterson	Linlithgow Rose	Free transfer	
1 February 2024	MF	(Portugal) Joaõ Baldé	East Kilbride	Undisclosed	
14 February 2024	FW	(England) Jermaine Hylton	(Lithuania) Kauno Žalgiris	Free transfer	

=== Loans in ===
Date	Position	Name	From	End date	Ref.
12 January 2024	MF	Adam Mackinnon	Ross County	31 May 2024	
13 January 2024	GK	Tom Welsh	Dundee	20 January 2024	
23 January 2024	GK	(Poland) Max Boruc	Hibernian	31 May 2024	
1 February 2024	DF	(England) Connor Teale	(England) Fleetwood Town	31 May 2024	
23 February 2024	FW	Charlie Reilly	Dundee	31 May 2024	

=== Loans out ===
Date	Position	Name	To	End date	Ref.
23 August 2023	MF	Scott Allan	(Northern Ireland) Larne	31 May 2024	
3 November 2023	MF	(Portugal) Joaõ Baldé	East Kilbride	1 January 2024	
