= 2022–23 Arbroath F.C. season =

Arbroath
2022–23 season
- Chairman: Mike Caird
- Manager: Dick Campbell
- Stadium: Gayfield Park
- Scottish Championship: Eighth Place
- Scottish League Cup: Second round
- Scottish Challenge Cup: Fourth round
- Scottish Cup: Fourth round
- Top goalscorer: League: Michael McKenna (5); All: Bobby Linn (7)
- Highest home attendance: 5,563 vs. Dundee, Championship, 8 April 2023
- Lowest home attendance: 900 vs. Cowdenbeath, League Cup, 13 July 2022
- Average home league attendance: 2,152
| Home colours | Away colours | Third colours |

The 2022–23 season was Arbroath's fourth consecutive season in the Scottish Championship, following their promotion from Scottish League One in the 2018–19 season. Arbroath also competed in the Scottish League Cup, Scottish Challenge Cup and the Scottish Cup.

== Competitions ==
=== Pre-season and friendlies ===
| Date | Opponent | Venue | Result (Note: Arbroath's score written first) | Scorers | Attendance | Ref. |
|---|---|---|---|---|---|---|
| 25 June 2022 | Brechin City | Away | 2–1 | Shanks 70', Gold 87' | | |
| 2 July 2022 | Montrose | Away | 1–1 | Trialist 90+3 | | |
| 20 July 2022 | (England) AFC Fylde | Home | 1–2 | Linn 70' | | |

=== Scottish Championship ===
| Win | Draw | Loss |

| Date | Opponent | Venue | Result | Scorers | Attendance | Ref. |
|---|---|---|---|---|---|---|
| 30 July 2022 | Ayr United | Away | 0–0 | | 1,872 | |
| 6 August 2022 | Inverness Caledonian Thistle | Home | 0–0 | | 1,861 | |
| 12 August 2022 | Dundee | Away | 2–4 | Low 51' pen., Hamilton 81' | 5,114 | |
| 20 August 2022 | Queen's Park | Home | 1–2 | Shanks 78' | 1,905 | |
| 27 August 2022 | Hamilton Academical | Away | 0–1 | | 1,317 | |
| 3 September 2022 | Partick Thistle | Home | 0–2 | | 2,065 | |
| 17 September 2022 | Greenock Morton | Away | 2–1 | Hilson 12', McKenna 40' pen. | 1,473 | |
| 1 October 2022 | Cove Rangers | Away | 0–2 | | 881 | |
| 8 October 2022 | Dundee | Home | 1–1 | Linn 37' | 3,372 | |
| 14 October 2022 | Queen's Park | Away | 1–1 | Linn 60' | 657 | |
| 19 October 2022 | Raith Rovers | Home | 0–1 | | 1,663 | |
| 22 October 2022 | Hamilton Academical | Home | 1–0 | Linn 45' | 1,588 | |
| 29 October 2022 | Ayr United | Home | 0–1 | | 1,660 | |
| 5 November 2022 | Inverness Caledonian Thistle | Away | 1–1 | Shanks 60' | 1,847 | |
| 12 November 2022 | Cove Rangers | Home | 1–1 | McKenna 5' | 1,706 | |
| 19 November 2022 | Partick Thistle | Away | 0–3 | | 2,839 | |
| 3 December 2022 | Greenock Morton | Home | 1–1 | Gold 47' | 1,664 | |
| 17 December 2022 | Raith Rovers | Away | 1–1 | Hamilton 45' | 1,264 | |
| 23 December 2022 | Queen's Park | Home | 1–4 | Fosu 90+2' | 1,267 | |
| 2 January 2023 | Dundee | Away | 4–2 | McKenna 9', Hamilton 13', O'Brien 58', Hilson 77', | 5,930 | |
| 7 January 2023 | Inverness Caledonian Thistle | Home | 1–4 | Ben El-Mhanni 26' | 1,803 | |
| 14 January 2023 | Ayr United | Away | 2–2 | Adarkwa 57', Ben El-Mhanni 63' | 2,064 | |
| 28 January 2023 | Greenock Morton | Away | 2–1 | Hamilton 63', McKenna 77' | 1,798 | |
| 4 February 2023 | Raith Rovers | Home | 1–2 | McKenna 20' | 2,042 | |
| 18 February 2023 | Cove Rangers | Away | 1–1 | Olusanya 89' | 1,529 | |
| 25 February 2023 | Partick Thistle | Home | 0–0 | | 2,057 | |
| 3 March 2023 | Hamilton Academical | Away | 0–0 | | 1,832 | |
| 17 March 2023 | Greenock Morton | Home | 1–1 | Adarkwa 78' | 1,578 | |
| 24 March 2023 | Queen's Park | Away | 1–0 | Hilson 76' | 747 | |
| 31 March 2023 | Ayr United | Home | 2–0 | Hilson 27', Gold 60' | 1,759 | |
| 8 April 2023 | Dundee | Home | 0–0 | | 5,563 | |
| 11 April 2023 | Inverness Caledonian Thistle | Away | 0–2 | | 2,038 | |
| 15 April 2023 | Raith Rovers | Away | 1–1 | O'Brien 48' | 2,150 | |
| 22 April 2023 | Cove Rangers | Home | 0–1 | | 2,451 | |
| 29 April 2023 | Partick Thistle | Away | 0–2 | | 3,701 | |
| 5 May 2023 | Hamilton Academical | Home | 0–0 | | 2,736 | |

=== Scottish League Cup ===
==== Group stage ====
| Win | Draw | Loss |

| Date | Opponent | Venue | Result | Scorers | Attendance | Ref. |
|---|---|---|---|---|---|---|
| 9 July 2022 | St Mirren | Away | 1–0 | Paterson 90+3 | 1,923 | |
| 13 July 2022 | Cowdenbeath | Home | 3–0 | Paterson 18', Hamilton 41', Donnelly 60' | 900 | |
| 16 July 2022 | Edinburgh | Away | 3–1 | Low 39', Linn 75', 81' | 499 | |
| 23 July 2022 | Airdrieonians | Home | 3–0 | McKenna 12', Shanks 48', Thomson 60' | 1,170 | |

==== Knockout phase ====
| Win | Draw | Loss |

| Round | Date | Opponent | Venue | Result | Scorers | Attendance | Ref. |
|---|---|---|---|---|---|---|---|
| Second round | 30 August 2022 | Partick Thistle | Away | 0–1 | | 1,960 | |

=== Scottish Challenge Cup ===
| Win | Draw | Loss |

| Round | Date | Opponent | Venue | Result | Scorers | Attendance | Ref. |
|---|---|---|---|---|---|---|---|
| Third round | 24 September 2022 | East Fife | Home | 2–1 | McKenna 10' pen., Hilson 12' | 1,123 | |
| Fourth round | 10 December 2022 | Dunfermline Athletic | Home | 1–5 | O'Brien 74' | 874 | |

=== Scottish Cup ===
| Win | Draw | Loss |

| Round | Date | Opponent | Venue | Result | Scorers | Attendance | Ref. |
|---|---|---|---|---|---|---|---|
| Third round | 26 November 2022 | Fraserburgh | Away | 2–0 | Linn 17', 89' | 1,060 | |
| Fourth round | 21 January 2023 | Motherwell | Home | 0–2 | | 4,145 | |

== Player statistics ==
=== Appearances and goals ===
As of 5 May 2023

| No. | Pos | Player | Championship | | League Cup | | Challenge Cup | | Scottish Cup | | Total | |
| No. | Pos | Player | Apps | Goals | Apps | Goals | Apps | Goals | Apps | Goals | Apps | Goals |
|---|---|---|---|---|---|---|---|---|---|---|---|---|
| 1 | GK | (Scotland) Derek Gaston | 35 | 0 | 4 | 0 | 0 | 0 | 1 | 0 | 40 | 0 |
| 2 | DF | (England) Lewis Banks | 12+1 | 0 | 0 | 0 | 0 | 0 | 0 | 0 | 13 | 0 |
| 3 | DF | (Scotland) Colin Hamilton | 30 | 4 | 4 | 1 | 2 | 0 | 2 | 0 | 38 | 5 |
| 4 | DF | (Scotland) Ricky Little | 34+1 | 0 | 5 | 0 | 2 | 0 | 2 | 0 | 44 | 0 |
| 5 | DF | (Scotland) Thomas O'Brien | 29 | 2 | 4 | 0 | 1 | 1 | 2 | 0 | 36 | 3 |
| 7 | MF | (Scotland) David Gold | 25+3 | 2 | 3+1 | 0 | 2 | 0 | 1+1 | 0 | 36 | 2 |
| 8 | MF | (Scotland) Michael McKenna | 31+2 | 5 | 5 | 1 | 1+1 | 1 | 2 | 0 | 42 | 7 |
| 9 | FW | (Scotland) Dale Hilson | 16+14 | 4 | 2+3 | 0 | 1+1 | 1 | 0+1 | 0 | 38 | 5 |
| 10 | MF | (South Africa) Keaghan Jacobs | 11+2 | 0 | 3+2 | 0 | 1+1 | 0 | 0 | 0 | 20 | 0 |
| 11 | MF | (Scotland) Bobby Linn | 16+17 | 3 | 4+1 | 2 | 0+2 | 0 | 1+1 | 2 | 42 | 7 |
| 12 | DF | (Scotland) Scott Stewart | 21+5 | 0 | 4+1 | 0 | 1 | 0 | 1 | 0 | 33 | 0 |
| 14 | FW | (Nigeria) Paul Komolafe | 0+7 | 0 | 0 | 0 | 0 | 0 | 0 | 0 | 7 | 0 |
| 15 | MF | (Scotland) Dylan Tait | 13+7 | 0 | 0 | 0 | 0 | 0 | 0+1 | 0 | 21 | 0 |
| 17 | FW | (England) Toyosi Olusanya | 5+4 | 1 | 0 | 0 | 0 | 0 | 0 | 0 | 9 | 1 |
| 18 | MF | (England) Yasin Ben El-Mhanni | 8+3 | 2 | 0 | 0 | 0 | 0 | 1 | 0 | 12 | 2 |
| 19 | MF | (Scotland) Ryan Dow | 12+2 | 0 | 0 | 0 | 0 | 0 | 1 | 0 | 15 | 0 |
| 20 | MF | (Republic of the Congo) Scott Bitsindou | 14+2 | 0 | 0 | 0 | 0 | 0 | 2 | 0 | 18 | 0 |
| 21 | GK | (Scotland) Cammy Gill | 1 | 0 | 1 | 0 | 2 | 0 | 1 | 0 | 5 | 0 |
| 23 | MF | (Scotland) Scott Allan | 9+7 | 0 | 1 | 0 | 1 | 0 | 1 | 0 | 19 | 0 |
| 24 | FW | (England) Sean Adarkwa | 7+2 | 2 | 0 | 0 | 0 | 0 | 1 | 0 | 10 | 2 |
| 25 | MF | (Portugal) Joaõ Baldé | 14+3 | 0 | 0 | 0 | 0 | 0 | 1 | 0 | 18 | 0 |
| 26 | MF | (England) Steven Hetherington | 10+3 | 0 | 0 | 0 | 0 | 0 | 0 | 0 | 13 | 0 |
Players who left the club during the 2022–23 season
| 2 | DF | (Scotland) Jason Thomson | 3+1 | 0 | 5 | 1 | 0 | 0 | 0 | 0 | 9 | 1 |
| 2 | DF | (England) Marcel Oakley | 15+1 | 0 | 0 | 0 | 2 | 0 | 1 | 0 | 19 | 0 |
| 6 | MF | (Scotland) Nicky Low | 4 | 1 | 2+2 | 1 | 0 | 0 | 0 | 0 | 8 | 2 |
| 14 | MF | (Scotland) Dylan Paterson | 0 | 0 | 1+3 | 2 | 0 | 0 | 0 | 0 | 4 | 2 |
| 15 | FW | (Scotland) Luke Donnelly | 2+1 | 0 | 1+1 | 1 | 0 | 0 | 0 | 0 | 5 | 1 |
| 16 | FW | (Scotland) Kieran Shanks | 4+10 | 2 | 2+3 | 1 | 1+1 | 0 | 1 | 0 | 22 | 3 |
| 17 | DF | (England) Deri Corfe | 0+8 | 0 | 0+1 | 0 | 1+1 | 0 | 0+1 | 0 | 12 | 0 |
| 18 | DF | (England) Mason Hancock | 6+5 | 0 | 1 | 0 | 1 | 0 | 0 | 0 | 13 | 0 |
| 19 | FW | (England) Kareem Isaka | 0+4 | 0 | 0 | 0 | 1+1 | 0 | 0 | 0 | 6 | 0 |
| 22 | MF | (Kosovo) Florent Hoti | 2+3 | 0 | 0 | 0 | 1 | 0 | 1 | 0 | 7 | 0 |
| 27 | MF | (England) Daniel Fosu | 6+12 | 1 | 1+3 | 0 | 2 | 0 | 0 | 0 | 24 | 1 |
| 28 | MF | (England) James Craigen | 0+4 | 0 | 2+3 | 0 | 0 | 0 | 0 | 0 | 9 | 0 |

== Team statistics ==
=== League table ===
| Pos | Team | Pld | W | D | L | GF | GA | GD | Pts | Promotion, qualification or relegation |
|---|---|---|---|---|---|---|---|---|---|---|
| 6 | Inverness Caledonian Thistle | 36 | 15 | 10 | 11 | 52 | 47 | +5 | 55 | |
| 7 | Raith Rovers | 36 | 11 | 10 | 15 | 46 | 49 | −3 | 43 | |
| 8 | Arbroath | 36 | 6 | 16 | 14 | 29 | 47 | −18 | 34 | |
| 9 | Hamilton Academical (R) | 36 | 7 | 10 | 19 | 31 | 63 | −32 | 31 | Qualification for the Championship play-offs |
| 10 | Cove Rangers (R) | 36 | 7 | 10 | 19 | 38 | 75 | −37 | 31 | Relegation to League One |

Rules for classification: 1) Points; 2) Goal difference; 3) Goals scored; 4) Head-to-to head points; 5) Head-to-head goal difference; 6) Play-off (only for deciding promotion, play-off participation and relegation).
(R) Relegated

=== League Cup table ===
| Pos | Team | Pld | W | PW | PL | L | GF | GA | GD | Pts | Qualification | ARB | AIR | STM | EDI | COW |
|---|---|---|---|---|---|---|---|---|---|---|---|---|---|---|---|---|
| 1 | Arbroath | 4 | 4 | 0 | 0 | 0 | 10 | 1 | +9 | 12 | Qualification for the second round | — | 3–0 | — | — | 3–0 |
| 2 | Airdrieonians | 4 | 2 | 0 | 1 | 1 | 6 | 4 | +2 | 7 | | — | — | 2–0 | 1–1p | — |
| 3 | St Mirren | 4 | 2 | 0 | 0 | 2 | 5 | 4 | +1 | 6 | | 0–1 | — | — | 3–1 | — |
| 4 | Edinburgh | 4 | 1 | 1 | 0 | 2 | 6 | 7 | −1 | 5 | | 1–3 | — | — | — | 3–0 |
| 5 | Cowdenbeath | 4 | 0 | 0 | 0 | 4 | 0 | 11 | −11 | 0 | | — | 0–3 | 0–2 | — | — |

Rules for classification: 1) goal difference, 2) goals scored, 3) away goals scored, 4) matches won, 5) away matches won, 6) drawing of lots.

== Transfers ==
=== Transfers in ===
| Date | Position | Name | From | Fee | Ref. |
|---|---|---|---|---|---|
| 24 May 2022 | GK | Cammy Gill | Cowdenbeath | Free transfer | |
| 25 May 2022 | MF | (South Africa) Keaghan Jacobs | Livingston | Free transfer | |
| 5 June 2022 | FW | Kieran Shanks | Inverurie Loco Works | Undisclosed | |
| 7 July 2022 | MF | (England) Daniel Fosu | (England) Thatcham Town | Free transfer | |
| 5 August 2022 | MF | (England) Deri Corfe | (United States) FC Tucson | Free transfer | |
| 17 August 2022 | MF | Scott Allan | Hibernian | Free transfer | |
| 1 September 2022 | FW | (England) Kareem Isiaka | Free Agent | Free transfer | |
| 11 November 2022 | MF | (Kosovo) Florent Hoti | Dundee United | Free transfer | |
| 1 January 2023 | FW | (England) Sean Adarkwa | (England) Queens Park Rangers | Free transfer | |
| 1 January 2023 | MF | (Portugal) Joaõ Baldé | Hibernian | Free transfer | |
| 1 January 2023 | MF | (England) Yasin Ben El-Mhanni | Free agent | Free transfer | |
| 6 January 2023 | MF | Ryan Dow | Peterhead | Free transfer | |
| 31 January 2023 | DF | (England) Lewis Banks | (Republic of Ireland) Sligo Rovers | Free transfer | |
| 4 February 2023 | FW | (Nigeria) Paul Komolafe | (Uzbekistan) Qizilqum | Free transfer | |

=== Transfers out ===
| Date | Position | Name | To | Fee | Ref. |
|---|---|---|---|---|---|
| 15 May 2022 | GK | (Wales) Calum Antell | Berwick Rangers | Free transfer | |
| 25 May 2022 | DF | Liam Henderson | Falkirk | Free transfer | |
| 25 May 2022 | MF | Gavin Swankie | Retired | Free transfer | |
| 24 July 2022 | FW | (England) Michael Bakare | (Finland) HIFK | Free transfer | |
| 31 August 2022 | FW | Luke Donnelly | Alloa Athletic | Free transfer | |
| 2 September 2022 | MF | James Craigen | Edinburgh City | Free transfer | |
| 2 September 2022 | DF | Jason Thomson | Kelty Hearts | Free transfer | |
| 1 January 2023 | MF | (England) Daniel Fosu | Peterhead | Free transfer | |
| 6 January 2023 | MF | (England) Deri Corfe | (New Zealand) Napier City Rovers | Free transfer | |
| 6 January 2023 | FW | (England) Kareem Isiaka | (England) Billericay Town | Free transfer | |
| 25 January 2023 | MF | (Kosovo) Florent Hoti | (England) Tranmere Rovers | Free transfer | |
| 17 February 2023 | MF | Nicky Low | Clydebank | Free transfer | |

=== Loans in ===
| Date | Position | Name | From | End date | Ref. |
|---|---|---|---|---|---|
| 28 July 2022 | DF | (England) Mason Hancock | Aberdeen | 31 May 2023 | |
| 1 September 2022 | DF | (England) Marcel Oakley | (England) Birmingham City | 1 January 2023 | |
| 1 September 2022 | MF | Dylan Tait | Hibernian | 31 May 2023 | |
| 29 September 2022 | MF | (Republic of the Congo) Scott Bitsindou | Lvingston | 31 May 2023 | |
| 6 January 2023 | MF | (England) Steven Hetherington | Falkirk | 31 May 2023 | |
| 25 January 2023 | FW | (England) Toyosi Olusanya | St Mirren | 31 May 2023 | |

=== Loans out ===
| Date | Position | Name | To | End date | Ref. |
|---|---|---|---|---|---|
| 9 September 2022 | MF | Nicky Low | Kelty Hearts | 17 February 2023 | |
| 7 October 2022 | MF | Dylan Paterson | Bo'ness Athletic | 31 May 2023 | |
| 6 January 2023 | FW | Kieran Shanks | Peterhead | 31 May 2023 | |
