= List of Scottish football transfers summer 2023 =

This is a list of Scottish football transfers, featuring at least one 2023–24 Scottish Premiership club or one 2023–24 Scottish Championship club, which were completed during the summer 2023 transfer window. The transfer window opened on 14 June 2023 and closed at midnight on 01 September 2023.

== List ==
Date	Name	Moving from	Moving to	Fee
18 May 2023	Craig Slater	Forfar Athletic	Arbroath	Free
18 May 2023	Lewis Moore	Queen's Park	Kelty Hearts	Free
18 May 2023	Dylan Corr	Celtic	Raith Rovers	Free
22 May 2023	Leighton McIntosh	Cove Rangers	Arbroath	Free
23 May 2023	Kane Ritchie-Hosler	Rangers	Dunfermline Athletic	Undisclosed
23 May 2023	Kieran Shanks	Arbroath	Peterhead	Undisclosed
23 May 2023	Ian Lawlor	Dundee	Doncaster Rovers	Free
24 May 2023	Aaron Steele	East Fife	Arbroath	Free
25 May 2023	Dylan Paterson	Arbroath	Linlithgow Rose	Free
25 May 2023	Yasin Ben El-Mhanni	Arbroath	Free agent	Free
25 May 2023	Cammy Gill	Arbroath	Montrose	Free
26 May 2023	Ryan Nolan	Raith Rovers	Hércules	Free
29 May 2023	Carlo Pignatiello	Greenock Morton	Dumbarton	Free
29 May 2023	Jack Fitzwater	Livingston	Exeter City	Free
29 May 2023	Stéphane Oméonga	Livingston	Bnei Sakhnin	Free
29 May 2023	Jack Hamilton	Livingston	Raith Rovers	Nominal
30 May 2023	Josh Mullin	Ayr United	Raith Rovers	Free
30 May 2023	Ryan Edwards	Dundee United	Chennaiyin	Free
30 May 2023	Mikey Devlin	Hibernian	Livingston	Free
30 May 2023	Murray Davidson	St Johnstone	Retired	Free
30 May 2023	Eetu Vertainen	St Johnstone	Triestina	Free
31 May 2023	Richard Tait	St Mirren	Retired	Free
31 May 2023	Jordan Marshall	Dundee	The New Saints	Free
31 May 2023	Aidan McAdams	Ayr United	Edinburgh City	Free
31 May 2023	Chris Maguire	Ayr United	Eastleigh	Free
1 June 2023	Nicky Devlin	Livingston	Aberdeen	Free
2 June 2023	Joe Shaughnessy	St Mirren	Dundee	Free
2 June 2023	Dale Hilson	Arbroath	Stirling Albion	Free
5 June 2023	Robbie Deas	Inverness Caledonian Thistle	Kilmarnock	Free
5 June 2023	Robbie Mutch	Edinburgh City	Ayr United	Free
6 June 2023	Ross McCrorie	Aberdeen	Bristol City	£2 million
6 June 2023	Luke Strachan	Dundee	Cove Rangers	Free
6 June 2023	Jordan Houston	Ayr United	Queen of the South	Free
6 June 2023	Callum Smith	Airdrieonians	Raith Rovers	Free
6 June 2023	George Stanger	Alloa Athletic	Ayr United	Free
7 June 2023	Ali Adams	Musselburgh Athletic	Arbroath	Free
7 June 2023	Scott Tiffoney	Partick Thistle	Dundee	Free
7 June 2023	Greig Young	Raith Rovers	Dumbarton	Free
8 June 2023	Charlie Reilly	Albion Rovers	Dundee	Free
8 June 2023	Kevin Dąbrowski	Hibernian	Raith Rovers	Free
9 June 2023	Kirk Broadfoot	Broomhill	Greenock Morton	Free
9 June 2023	Logan Dunachie	Motherwell	Clyde	Free
9 June 2023	Calum Waters	Kilmarnock	Greenock Morton	Free
9 June 2023	Liam Brown	Queen's Park	East Kilbride	Free
10 June 2023	Kevin Nisbet	Hibernian	Millwall	£2 million
11 June 2023	Ryan Kent	Rangers	Fenerbahçe	Free
13 June 2023	Nikolay Todorov	Dunfermline Athletic	Airdrieonians	Free
13 June 2023	Arron Darge	Heart of Midlothian	Cove Rangers	Free
14 June 2023	Marijan Cabraja	Hibernian	Rijeka	Undisclosed
14 June 2023	Kyle McClelland	Hibernian	Queen of the South	Loan
14 June 2023	Jake Carroll	Motherwell	Free agent	Free
14 June 2023	Kian Speirs	Motherwell	Caledonian Braves	Free
14 June 2023	Dean McMaster	St Mirren	Airdrieonians	Free
15 June 2023	Lewis Banks	Arbroath	Altrincham	Free
15 June 2023	David Devine	Motherwell	Alloa Athletic	Free
15 June 2023	Lee Kilday	Queen's Park	Hamilton Academical	Free
15 June 2023	Tom Lang	Raith Rovers	Falkirk	Free
15 June 2023	Calvin Miller	Greenock Morton	Falkirk	Free
15 June 2023	Brad Spencer	Raith Rovers	Falkirk	Free
15 June 2023	David Cancola	Ross County	Ionikos	Free
15 June 2023	Dominic Samuel	Ross County	Ebbsfleet United	Free
15 June 2023	Sam Lammers	Atalanta	Rangers	£3 million
15 June 2023	Leighton Clarkson	Liverpool	Aberdeen	Undisclosed
15 June 2023	Aaron Reid	Aberdeen	Peterhead	Loan
16 June 2023	Elliot Parish	St Johnstone	Free agent	Free
16 June 2023	Adam Le Fondre	Sydney FC	Hibernian	Free
16 June 2023	Ester Sokler	Radomlje	Aberdeen	Undisclosed
16 June 2023	Antonio Portales	Atlante	Dundee	Free
16 June 2023	Mark Stowe	Linlithgow Rose	Arbroath	Free
16 June 2023	Ash Taylor	Kilmarnock	Bradford City	Free
16 June 2023	Jake Davidson	Queen's Park	Inverness Caledonian Thistle	Free
18 June 2023	Scott Allardice	Inverness Caledonian Thistle	Ross County	Free
19 June 2023	Jackson Longridge	Livingston	Hamilton Academical	Free
19 June 2023	Ross Docherty	Partick Thistle	Dundee United	Free
19 June 2023	Kyle MacDonald	Dunfermline Athletic	Hamilton Academical	Free
19 June 2023	Jonathan Obika	Morecambe	Motherwell	Free
19 June 2023	Callum Roberts	Aberdeen	Scunthorpe United	Undisclosed
20 June 2023	Kevin O'Hara	Dunfermline Athletic	Hamilton Academical	Free
20 June 2023	Euan Henderson	Heart of Midlothian	Hamilton Academical	Free
20 June 2023	Euan Deveney	Airdrieonians	Alloa Athletic	Free
20 June 2023	Kevin van Veen	Motherwell	Groningen	£500,000
20 June 2023	Jamie Murphy	St Johnstone	Ayr United	Free
20 June 2023	Sam Fisher	Dundee	Dunfermline Athletic	Compensation
20 June 2023	Ryan Mullen	Clyde	Greenock Morton	Free
20 June 2023	Charlie Gilmour	St Johnstone	Inverness Caledonian Thistle	Free
20 June 2023	Elliot Dunlop	St Mirren	Airdrieonians	Free
21 June 2023	Callum Yeats	Queen's Park	Civil Service Strollers	Free
21 June 2023	Kyle Magennis	Hibernian	Kilmarnock	Free
21 June 2023	Will Dennis	Bournemouth	Kilmarnock	Loan
21 June 2023	Matty Kennedy	Aberdeen	Kilmarnock	Free
21 June 2023	Chris Stokes	Kilmarnock	Morecambe	Free
21 June 2023	Kyle Turner	Partick Thistle	Ross County	Free
21 June 2023	Liam Grimshaw	Greenock Morton	Dundee United	Free
21 June 2023	Ewan Otoo	Celtic	Dunfermline Athletic	Free
21 June 2023	Sam Kane	Rangers	Queen's Park	Free
22 June 2023	Rocco Hickey-Fugaccia	Livingston	Queen's Park	Free
22 June 2023	Odin Thiago Holm	Vålerenga	Celtic	£2.6 million
22 June 2023	Dean Cornelius	Motherwell	Harrogate Town	Free
22 June 2023	Jordan Obita	Wycombe Wanderers	Hibernian	Free
22 June 2023	Scott Arfield	Rangers	Charlotte FC	Free
22 June 2023	Adam Hutchinson	Dundee United	Forfar Athletic	Free
22 June 2023	Darren Watson	Dundee United	Forfar Athletic	Free
22 June 2023	Corrie Ndaba	Ipswich Town	Kilmarnock	Loan
22 June 2023	Evan Towler	Aberdeen	Montrose	Loan
22 June 2023	Ruari Paton	Queen of the South	Queen's Park	Free
23 June 2023	Barry Hepburn	Bayern Munich II	Queen's Park	Loan
23 June 2023	Jojo Wollacott	Charlton Athletic	Hibernian	Undisclosed
23 June 2023	Kevin Holt	Partick Thistle	Dundee United	Free
23 June 2023	Alex Iacovitti	Ross County	Port Vale	Free
23 June 2023	Keith Watson	Ross County	Raith Rovers	Free
23 June 2023	Dean Campbell	Aberdeen	Barrow	Free
24 June 2023	Franny Amartey	Aldershot Town	Ayr United	Free
24 June 2023	Oliver Pendlebury	Aldershot Town	Ayr United	Free
24 June 2023	Daire O'Connor	Ayr United	Glentoran	Free
24 June 2023	Jon Craig	Kilmarnock	Clyde	Free
25 June 2023	Bobby Linn	Arbroath	Lochee United	Free
26 June 2023	Arnaud Djoum	Dundee United	Free agent	Free
26 June 2023	Scott Robinson	Kilmarnock	Partick Thistle	Free
26 June 2023	Max Boruc	Slask Wroclaw	Hibernian	Undisclosed
26 June 2023	Josh Reid	Coventry City	Ross County	Undisclosed
26 June 2023	Cammy Logan	Heart of Midlothian	Queen of the South	Free
26 June 2023	Mo Sangare	Accrington Stanley	Livingston	Undisclosed
26 June 2023	Paul McMullan	Dundee	Derry City	Free
27 June 2023	Blessing Oluyemi	Aberdeen	Peterhead	Free
27 June 2023	Cammy Smith	Partick Thistle	Morecambe	Free
27 June 2023	Steven Fletcher	Dundee United	Wrexham	Free
27 June 2023	Miles Welch-Hayes	Harrogate Town	Livingston	Free
28 June 2023	Jack Aitchison	Motherwell	Exeter City	Free
28 June 2023	Max Sheaf	Redditch United	Ross County	Undisclosed
28 June 2023	Graeme Shinnie	Wigan Athletic	Aberdeen	Undisclosed
28 June 2023	Rhys Williams	Liverpool	Aberdeen	Loan
28 June 2023	Zach Hemming	Middlesbrough	St Mirren	Loan
28 June 2023	James Dolan	Ayr United	Stranraer	Free
28 June 2023	Reece Lyon	Greenock Morton	Kelty Hearts	Free
28 June 2023	Mateusz Żukowski	Rangers	Śląsk Wrocław	Undisclosed
29 June 2023	Liam Harvey	Aberdeen	Elgin City	Loan
29 June 2023	Abdallah Sima	Brighton & Hove Albion	Rangers	Loan
29 June 2023	Eamonn Brophy	St Mirren	Ross County	Undisclosed
29 June 2023	Stav Nahmani	Maccabi Haifa	St Mirren	Loan
30 June 2023	Jay Henderson	St Mirren	Ross County	Undisclosed
30 June 2023	Marco Tilio	Melbourne City	Celtic	£1 million
30 June 2023	Aaron Mooy	Celtic	Retired	Free
30 June 2023	Zach Robinson	Wimbledon	Dundee	Loan
30 June 2023	Filip Helander	Rangers	Odense	Free
30 June 2023	Allan McGregor	Rangers	Free agent	Free
30 June 2023	Alfredo Morelos	Rangers	Santos	Free
30 June 2023	Darren McGregor	Hibernian	Retired	Free
30 June 2023	Michael Smith	Heart of Midlothian	Yeovil Town	Free
1 July 2023	Kinlay Bilham	Ayr United	Stenhousemuir	Free
1 July 2023	Elie Youan	St Gallen	Hibernian	£500,000
1 July 2023	Murray Aiken	Hibernian	Airdrieonians	Loan
1 July 2023	Josh O'Connor	Hibernian	Airdrieonians	Loan
1 July 2023	Murray Johnson	Hibernian	Queen of the South	Loan
1 July 2023	Scott McGill	Heart of Midlothian	Raith Rovers	Free
1 July 2023	Lee Hodson	Kilmarnock	Eastleigh	Free
1 July 2023	Kieran Dowell	Norwich City	Rangers	Free
1 July 2023	Dujon Sterling	Chelsea	Rangers	Free
1 July 2023	Jack Butland	Crystal Palace	Rangers	Free
1 July 2023	Jack Spong	Brighton & Hove Albion	Queen's Park	Free
1 July 2023	Wasiri Williams	Swansea City	Partick Thistle	Free
1 July 2023	Jack Turner	Southampton	Queen's Park	Free
1 July 2023	Will Tizzard	Southampton	Queen's Park	Free
3 July 2023	Spencer Moreland	St Johnstone	Brechin City	Free
3 July 2023	Josh Ginnelly	Heart of Midlothian	Swansea City	Free
3 July 2023	Adam Montgomery	Celtic	Fleetwood Town	Loan
3 July 2023	Jon McCracken	Norwich City	Dundee	Loan
3 July 2023	Owen Beck	Liverpool	Dundee	Loan
3 July 2023	Jota	Celtic	Al-Ittihad	£25 million
3 July 2023	Dylan Tait	Hibernian	Hamilton Academical	Loan
4 July 2023	Conor Wilkinson	Walsall	Motherwell	Free
4 July 2023	Steven Boyd	Inverness Caledonian Thistle	Greenock Morton	Free
4 July 2023	Gregor Nicol	Queen's Park	East Fife	Free
5 July 2023	Calum Biggar	Queen's Park	East Kilbride	Free
5 July 2023	Dylan Levitt	Dundee United	Hibernian	£300,000
5 July 2023	Ian Harkes	Dundee United	New England Revolution	Free
6 July 2023	Darren Brownlie	Partick Thistle	Dundalk	Free
6 July 2023	Danny Mullen	Partick Thistle	Derry City	Free
6 July 2023	Conor McMenamin	Glentoran	St Mirren	£125,000
6 July 2023	Cyriel Dessers	Cremonese	Rangers	£4.5 million
6 July 2023	Ross Doohan	Forest Green Rovers	Aberdeen	Undisclosed
6 July 2023	Zach Paris	Heart of Midlothian	Forfar Athletic	Free
6 July 2023	Arran Smith	Aberdeen	Peterhead	Free
7 July 2023	Mikael Mandron	Motherwell	St Mirren	Free
7 July 2023	Joe Lewis	Aberdeen	Free agent	Free
7 July 2023	Orestis Kiomourtzoglou	Heart of Midlothian	Greuther Furth	Undisclosed
7 July 2023	Diego Pineda	Correcaminos UAT	Dundee	Free
7 July 2023	Kenan Dünnwald-Turan	Straelen	Arbroath	Free
7 July 2023	James Brown	Blackburn Rovers	Ross County	Free
8 July 2023	Adam Brooks	Celtic	Inverness Caledonian Thistle	Free
9 July 2023	Michael O'Halloran	St Johnstone	Dunfermline Athletic	Free
10 July 2023	Jack Walton	Luton Town	Dundee United	Loan
10 July 2023	Oliver Denham	Cardiff City	Dundee United	Loan
11 July 2023	Kieran O'Hara	Colchester United	Kilmarnock	Free
11 July 2023	Conor Hazard	Celtic	Plymouth Argyle	Undisclosed
12 July 2023	Leon Balogun	Queens Park Rangers	Rangers	Free
12 July 2023	Jess Norey	Barking	Arbroath	Free
13 July 2023	Runar Hauge	Hibernian	Jerv	Free
13 July 2023	Tomoki Iwata	Yokohama F. Marinos	Celtic	Undisclosed
13 July 2023	Josh McCulloch	Hibernian	Clyde	Free
13 July 2023	Cameron Mulvanny	Kilmarnock	Clyde	Free
13 July 2023	Ryan MacLeman	Ross County	Elgin City	Loan
13 July 2023	Finn Robson	Dundee United	Forfar Athletic	Loan
13 July 2023	Lewis Pirie	Aberdeen	Leeds United	£200,000
13 July 2023	Billy Owens	Partick Thistle	Kelty Hearts	Free
14 July 2023	Stuart Findlay	Oxford United	Kilmarnock	Loan
14 July 2023	Michael McGovern	Norwich City	Heart of Midlothian	Free
14 July 2023	Dimitar Mitov	Cambridge United	St Johnstone	Free
14 July 2023	Robbie Mahon	Motherwell	Edinburgh City	Loan
14 July 2023	Blair McKenzie	Aberdeen	Elgin City	Loan
15 July 2023	Antonio Colak	Rangers	Parma	£2.5 million
15 July 2023	Sam Campbell	Motherwell	Annan Athletic	Loan
15 July 2023	Jack Bearne	Liverpool	Greenock Morton	Free
15 July 2023	Dipo Akinyemi	Ayr United	York City	Undisclosed
17 July 2023	Nohan Kenneh	Hibernian	Shrewsbury Town	Loan
17 July 2023	Pape Souare	Morecambe	Motherwell	Free
17 July 2023	Michael Nottingham	Accrington Stanley	Livingston	Free
17 July 2023	Jay Bird	Dagenham and Redbridge	Arbroath	Free
18 July 2023	Caleb Goldie	Celtic	Peterhead	Free
18 July 2023	Curtis Main	St Mirren	Bengaluru	Free
18 July 2023	Riley Harbottle	Nottingham Forest	Hibernian	Undisclosed
18 July 2023	Louis Moult	Burton Albion	Dundee United	Free
18 July 2023	Will Nightingale	Wimbledon	Ross County	Loan
18 July 2023	Euan Murray	Hartlepool United	Raith Rovers	Free
18 July 2023	Malachi Boateng	Crystal Palace	Dundee	Loan
18 July 2023	Ben Williamson	Rangers	Partick Thistle	Loan
20 July 2023	Lewis Mayo	Rangers	Kilmarnock	Undisclosed
20 July 2023	Liam Smith	Dundee United	Cheltenham Town	Free
21 July 2023	Aiden McGeady	Hibernian	Ayr United	Free
21 July 2023	Or Dadia	Hapoel Be'er Sheva	Aberdeen	Loan
21 July 2023	Marley Watkins	Aberdeen	Kilmarnock	Free
21 July 2023	Luke Jephcott	Plymouth Argyle	St Johnstone	Free
21 July 2023	Luis Longstaff	Cove Rangers	Inverness Caledonian Thistle	Free
21 July 2023	Davor Zdravkovski	AEL Limassol	Motherwell	Free
21 July 2023	Kian Leslie	Kilmarnock	Clyde	Loan
22 July 2023	Calem Nieuwenhof	Western Sydney Wanderers	Heart of Midlothian	Undisclosed
22 July 2023	Liam Shaw	Celtic	Wigan Athletic	Loan
24 July 2023	Yang Hyun-jun	Gangwon FC	Celtic	£2 million
24 July 2023	Kwon Hyeok-kyu	Busan IPark	Celtic	£850,000
24 July 2023	Frankie Kent	Peterborough United	Heart of Midlothian	Undisclosed
24 July 2023	Ross Tierney	Motherwell	Walsall	Loan
24 July 2023	Ahkeem Rose	Weymouth	Ayr United	Free
24 July 2023	Paul McGowan	Dundee	Cove Rangers	Free
24 July 2023	Aaron Donnelly	Nottingham Forest	Dundee	Loan
25 July 2023	Efe Ambrose	Greenock Morton	Queen of the South	Free
25 July 2023	Max Johnston	Motherwell	Sturm Graz	Compensation
25 July 2023	Connor McLennan	Aberdeen	Salford City	Free
25 July 2023	Jaze Kabia	Livingston	Cork City	Free
25 July 2023	Cameron Blacklock	Dundee	Forfar Athletic	Free
26 July 2023	Maik Nawrocki	Legia Warsaw	Celtic	£4.3 million
26 July 2023	Declan Gallagher	St Mirren	Dundee United	Undisclosed
26 July 2023	James Bolton	Plymouth Argyle	St Mirren	Free
26 July 2023	Thomas Davies	Cardiff City	Kilmarnock	Loan
26 July 2023	Jayden Richardson	Aberdeen	Stockport County	Loan
26 July 2023	Osaze Urhoghide	Celtic	Amiens	Undisclosed
27 July 2023	Will Fish	Manchester United	Hibernian	Loan
27 July 2023	Amadou Bakayoko	Forest Green Rovers	Dundee	Loan
27 July 2023	Tomi Adeloye	Swindon Town	Partick Thistle	Loan
28 July 2023	Jermaine Hylton	Rushall Olympic	Arbroath	Free
28 July 2023	Andy McNeil	Raith Rovers	Edinburgh City	Loan
28 July 2023	Danilo	Feyenoord	Rangers	£5 million
28 July 2023	Vasilis Barkas	Celtic	Utrecht	Free
28 July 2023	Luke Mahady	Raith Rovers	Bonnyrigg Rose	Free
29 July 2023	Blair Alston	Kilmarnock	Partick Thistle	Free
30 July 2023	Harry Lodovica	Aveley	Inverness Caledonian Thistle	Free
31 July 2023	Dylan Vente	Roda JC	Hibernian	£700,000
31 July 2023	Slobodan Rubežić	Novi Pazar	Aberdeen	Undisclosed
1 August 2023	Theo Bair	St Johnstone	Motherwell	Free
1 August 2023	Connall Ewan	Ross County	Elgin City	Loan
2 August 2023	Trevor Carson	St Mirren	Dundee	Undisclosed
2 August 2023	Kieran Offord	St Mirren	Edinburgh City	Loan
2 August 2023	Fraser Taylor	St Mirren	Ballymena United	Loan
3 August 2023	Kerr McInroy	Kilmarnock	Partick Thistle	Loan
3 August 2023	Sam McClelland	Chelsea	St Johnstone	Free
3 August 2023	Lewis Neilson	Heart of Midlothian	Partick Thistle	Loan
3 August 2023	Harrison Sharp	Dundee	Dunfermline Athletic	Loan
3 August 2023	José Cifuentes	Los Angeles FC	Rangers	£400,000
3 August 2023	Mika Biereth	Arsenal	Motherwell	Loan
3 August 2023	Elicha Ahui	Lincoln City	Ayr United	Loan
3 August 2023	Kyosuke Tagawa	Tokyo	Heart of Midlothian	Undisclosed
3 August 2023	Jamie MacDonald	Raith Rovers	Greenock Morton	Free
4 August 2023	Charlie Mulgrew	Dundee United	Retired	Free
4 August 2023	Brian Schwake	Livingston	CD Castellón	Free
4 August 2023	Daniel MacKay	Hibernian	Livingston	Loan
4 August 2023	Alan Power	Kilmarnock	Greenock Morton	Free
4 August 2023	Ylber Ramadani	Aberdeen	Lecce	£1.1 million
4 August 2023	Alex Lowry	Rangers	Heart of Midlothian	Loan
4 August 2023	Mason Hancock	Aberdeen	Airdrieonians	Free
4 August 2023	Michael Garrity	Greenock Morton	Annan Athletic	Loan
4 August 2023	Thomas Welsh	Dundee	Arbroath	Loan
4 August 2023	Jack Wilkie	Dundee	Edinburgh City	Loan
4 August 2023	Michael Hewitt	Ayr United	Hamilton Academical	Free
4 August 2023	Lewis O'Donnell	Dundee United	Kelty Hearts	Loan
4 August 2023	Oludare Olufunwa	Liverpool	St Johnstone	Free
4 August 2023	Gallagher Lennon	Partick Thistle	St Mirren	Free
5 August 2023	Aziz Behich	Dundee United	Melbourne City	Undisclosed
5 August 2023	Matthew Smith	MK Dons	St Johnstone	Free
7 August 2023	Aphelele Teto	TS Galaxy	Livingston	Free
7 August 2023	Kenneth Vargas	Herediano	Heart of Midlothian	Loan
8 August 2023	Fashion Sakala	Rangers	Al-Fayha	£3 million
8 August 2023	Ryan Leak	Salford City	Ross County	Free
10 August 2023	Wes McDonald	Hartlepool United	Partick Thistle	Free
10 August 2023	Carl Starfelt	Celtic	Celta Vigo	£4.3 million
10 August 2023	Ben McPherson	Celtic	Queen's Park	Loan
10 August 2023	Shaun Byrne	Dundee	Raith Rovers	Loan
11 August 2023	Melker Hallberg	St Johnstone	Kalmar FF	Free
11 August 2023	Jackson Mylchreest	St Johnstone	Tranent	Loan
11 August 2023	Bobby Dailly	St Johnstone	Romford	Free
11 August 2023	James McGarry	Central Coast Mariners	Aberdeen	Undisclosed
11 August 2023	Scott Williamson	Queen's Park	Cove Rangers	Loan
11 August 2023	Matthew Wright	Ross County	Elgin City	Loan
11 August 2023	Samson Lawal	TS Galaxy	Livingston	Undisclosed
11 August 2023	Kieran Ngwenya	Aberdeen	Partick Thistle	Loan
11 August 2023	Dave Richards	Crewe Alexandra	St Johnstone	Loan
11 August 2023	Ben Summers	Celtic	Dunfermline Athletic	Loan
14 August 2023	Elias Melkersen	Hibernian	Strømsgodset	Loan
15 August 2023	Dara Costelloe	Burnley	St Johnstone	Loan
15 August 2023	Ilmari Niskanen	Dundee United	Exeter City	Undisclosed
15 August 2023	Iain Wilson	Queen of the South	Greenock Morton	Loan
15 August 2023	Miller Thomson	Dundee United	Montrose	Loan
16 August 2023	Gustaf Lagerbielke	Elfsborg	Celtic	£3 million
18 August 2023	Odel Offiah	Brighton & Hove Albion	Heart of Midlothian	Loan
18 August 2023	Alex Ferguson	St Johnstone	Queen of the South	Loan
18 August 2023	Barry Maguire	Motherwell	Kidderminster Harriers	Loan
19 August 2023	Logan Chalmers	Dundee United	Ayr United	Loan
19 August 2023	Euan Mutale	Dundee	Forfar Athletic	Loan
22 August 2023	Luke Robinson	Wigan Athletic	St Johnstone	Loan
22 August 2023	Jamie McGrath	Wigan Athletic	Aberdeen	Free
23 August 2023	Richard Jensen	Górnik Zabrze	Aberdeen	Undisclosed
23 August 2023	Brodie Spencer	Huddersfield Town	Motherwell	Free
24 August 2023	Jay Turner-Cooke	Newcastle United	St Johnstone	Loan
24 August 2023	Ewan Henderson	Hibernian	Oostende	Loan
24 August 2023	Marley Sweeney-Rowe	Dundee	Stenhousemuir	Loan
25 August 2023	Taylor Steven	St Johnstone	Alloa Athletic	Loan
25 August 2023	Oscar MacIntyre	Hibernian	Queen of the South	Loan
25 August 2023	Gavin Gallagher	St Mirren	Airdrieonians	Free
25 August 2023	Jack Young	Wycombe Wanderers	Ayr United	Loan
25 August 2023	Ji Stevenson	Partick Thistle	Clyde	Loan
25 August 2023	Mohamed Sylla	Hartlepool United	Dundee	Undisclosed
26 August 2023	Liam McStravick	Linfield	Airdrieonians	Undisclosed
26 August 2023	Ricki Lamie	Motherwell	Dundee	Loan
26 August 2023	Thierry Small	Southampton	St Mirren	Loan
28 August 2023	Ryan Howley	Coventry City	Dundee	Loan
29 August 2023	Pape Habib Gueye	Kortrijk	Aberdeen	Undisclosed
29 August 2023	Roy Syla	Brentford	Ayr United	Free
29 August 2023	Max Anderson	Dundee	Inverness Caledonian Thistle	Loan
29 August 2023	Danny Lloyd	Rochdale	Livingston	Free
30 August 2023	Oliver Pendlebury	Ayr United	Farnborough	Free
30 August 2023	Luis Palma	Aris	Celtic	£3.5 million
30 August 2023	Callum Hannah	Kirkcaldy & Dysart	Raith Rovers	Free
31 August 2023	Nat Phillips	Liverpool	Celtic	Loan
31 August 2023	Glen Kamara	Rangers	Leeds United	£5 million
31 August 2023	Layton Bisland	Dundee United	Falkirk	Loan
31 August 2023	Oli Shaw	Barnsley	Motherwell	Loan
1 September 2023	Esmaël Gonçalves	Livingston	Free agent	Free
1 September 2023	Ismaila Soro	Celtic	Beitar Jerusalem	Undisclosed
1 September 2023	Stefan Gartenmann	Midtjylland	Aberdeen	Loan
1 September 2023	Jack Senga	Reading	Ayr United	Loan
1 September 2023	Marcel Lewis	Burnley	Dundee	Loan
1 September 2023	Owen Moffat	Blackpool	Dunfermline Athletic	Loan
1 September 2023	Kieran Mitchell	Raith Rovers	East Fife	Loan
1 September 2023	Morgan Boyes	Livingston	Inverness Caledonian Thistle	Loan
1 September 2023	Nikola Ujdur	Rockdale Ilinden	Inverness Caledonian Thistle	Free
1 September 2023	Andrew Dallas	Barnsley	Kilmarnock	Loan
1 September 2023	Luke Graham	Dundee	Montrose	Loan
1 September 2023	Georgie Gent	Blackburn Rovers	Motherwell	Loan
1 September 2023	Harry Stone	Heart of Midlothian	Queen of the South	Loan
1 September 2023	Scott High	Huddersfield Town	Ross County	Loan
1 September 2023	Diallang Jaiyesimi	Charlton Athletic	St Johnstone	Loan
1 September 2023	Sven Sprangler	Vorwärts Steyr	St Johnstone	Free
1 September 2023	Connor Smith	Heart of Midlothian	Scunthorpe United	Loan
1 September 2023	Anthony Stewart	Aberdeen	MK Dons	Loan
1 September 2023	Sead Hakšabanović	Celtic	Stoke City	Loan

== See also ==
- List of Scottish football transfers winter 2022–23
- List of Scottish football transfers winter 2023–24
