= Scott Allan =

Scottish footballer

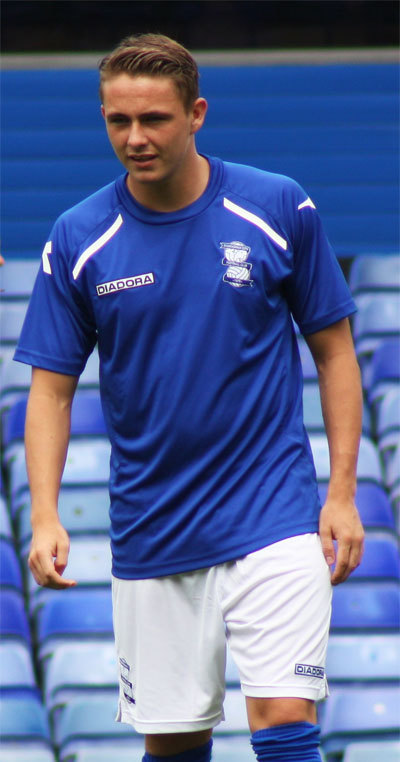
- Allan training with Birmingham City in 2013

Personal information
- Full name: Scott Allan
- Date of birth: 28 November 1991 (age 34)
- Place of birth: Glasgow, Scotland
- Height: 5 ft 9 in (1.75 m)
- Position: Midfielder

Team information
- Current team: East Kilbride (first-team coach)

Youth career
- 2001–2010: Dundee United

Senior career*
Years	Team	Apps	(Gls)
2010–2012	Dundee United	8	(0)
2010	→ Forfar Athletic (loan)	4	(1)
2012–2014	West Bromwich Albion	0	(0)
2012	→ Portsmouth (loan)	15	(1)
2012	→ Milton Keynes Dons (loan)	4	(0)
2012–2013	→ Portsmouth (loan)	9	(1)
2013–2014	→ Birmingham City (loan)	5	(0)
2014–2015	Hibernian	33	(2)
2015–2019	Celtic	13	(0)
2016–2017	→ Rotherham United (loan)	10	(0)
2017–2018	→ Dundee (loan)	16	(0)
2018	→ Hibernian (loan)	12	(3)
2019–2022	Hibernian	55	(5)
2021	→ Inverness Caledonian Thistle (loan)	6	(0)
2022–2024	Arbroath	16	(0)
2023–2024	→ Larne (loan)	6	(1)
2024–2025	Kelty Hearts	18	(2)
Total		230	(16)

International career
2007–2008	Scotland U17	4	(0)
2011–2012	Scotland U21	10	(0)
- * Club domestic league appearances and goals

Scott Allan (born 28 November 1991) is a Scottish former professional footballer who played as a midfielder. He is currently a coach with Scottish League One club East Kilbride.

Allan began his career in Scotland with Dundee United, and spent time on loan with Forfar Athletic, before joining English Premier League club West Bromwich Albion in 2012. He never broke into the first team, and after loan spells with Portsmouth (twice), Milton Keynes Dons and Birmingham City, he was released at the end of the 2013–14 season.

Allan then returned to Scottish football with Hibernian. After one season with Hibs, Allan joined Celtic. After signing for Celtic he had loan spells at Rotherham United, Dundee and Hibernian. Allan returned to Hibernian under freedom of contract in 2019 after four years at Celtic, departing in 2022. Allan spent the next two seasons contracted to Arbroath, and also went on loan to Northern Irish club Larne, with whom he won the NIFL Premiership. He then spent the following season as a player-coach for Kelty Hearts. Allan retired in the summer of 2025 and began his coaching career.

He is also a Scotland youth international, having represented his country at under-17 and under-21 level.

== Early life ==
Allan was born in Glasgow, and was a pupil at Rosshall Academy in Crookston until 2008. He grew up as a Rangers supporter and said his idol was Paul Gascoigne.

== Club career ==
=== Dundee United ===
Allan joined Dundee United at the age of 10, and signed a full-time contract in January 2008. In September 2008 he represented United against Montrose in a Forfarshire Cup tie.

Allan signed for Forfar Athletic in September 2010 on an emergency loan until 30 October 2010. He made his debut for them in a Second Division league fixture against Alloa Athletic on 2 September 2010. In total he made four league appearances for Forfar, scoring one goal for them, in his last game for the club on 30 October 2010 against Livingston.

After returning to United, Allan was named on the bench for four Scottish Premier League (SPL) fixtures during the 2010–11 season but did not make an appearance. He made his debut for United on 14 July 2011, as a substitute in their 1–0 Europa League defeat against Śląsk Wrocław. He made his SPL debut on 31 July 2011 against Heart of Midlothian at Tynecastle Stadium in an away victory for Dundee United, playing 83 minutes. Contract negotiations between Allan, whose deal expired at the end of the 2011–12 season, and United broke down in September 2011. It was reported that he was asking for £1,600 per week, which would have made him the third highest earner at the club. Several clubs, including Rangers, Celtic and Newcastle United, expressed an interest in signing Allan. As a result of rejecting a new contract, Allan fell out with Manager Peter Houston.

=== West Bromwich Albion ===
==== 2011–12: Portsmouth loan ====
In December 2011, United agreed a deal with West Bromwich Albion. Allan completed his move to Albion on 9 January 2012.

In February 2012, he joined Championship side Portsmouth on a 28-day youth loan. His debut in English football came on 25 February for Portsmouth, when he featured in the starting line-up playing 76 minutes in scoreless draw at home to Leeds United. He then extended his deal by another 28 days on Thursday 22 March 2012. He scored his first goal for Portsmouth and set up a goal for Greg Halford in a 2–1 win against Crystal Palace on 17 April 2012.

==== 2012–13: MK Dons and Portsmouth loans ====
After his loan at Portsmouth, Allan was linked with a loan move with Crystal Palace. However, the move fell through.

On 29 September 2012, Allan joined League One side MK Dons on a one-month loan deal. He made his debut against Crewe Alexandra in a 1–0 victory.

On 29 October 2012, after little success with MK Dons, Albion sent Allan back to Portsmouth. Shortly signing for Portsmouth, Allan made his debut in a 1–0 loss against Sheffield United, playing 90 minutes. Weeks later, Allan scored on his return in a 3–2 loss against Leyton Orient. After the game, the club revealed they are on the verge of extending Allan's loan spell and it was successfully negotiated for another month On 21 December 2012, his loan spell was extended until 4 January 2013 He returned to Albion when his loan expired, having played his last game in a 2–0 loss against Walsall.

==== 2013–14: Birmingham City loan ====
Allan signed for Birmingham City on a season-long loan on 19 July 2013. He made his debut as a second-half substitute in a 1–0 defeat at home to Watford on 3 August, and scored twice as Birmingham beat Plymouth Argyle 3–2 after extra time in the League Cup three days later. He made no first-team appearances after August until receiving a surprise recall to the squad, playing in two of the last three League matches of the season.

West Bromwich Albion chose not to take up the option of extending Allan's contract for another year, and he was released at the end of the 2013–14 season.

=== Hibernian ===
Despite being linked to a move to Rangers, Allan signed a two-year contract with Hibernian in July 2014. Allan made his debut for Hibs on 5 August 2014, coming on as a substitute during extra-time in a 2–1 defeat against Rangers in the Scottish Challenge Cup. He made his first league appearance for Hibs on 17 August, coming on as a late substitute against Hearts. Allan soon established himself as a regular in the team, and after scoring his first goal for the club in a 6–3 win over Dumbarton in November, manager Alan Stubbs described him as being "as good as anyone in the league", adding that he considered Allan to be "head and shoulders above a lot of people he's up against." He turned in an outstanding performance for Hibs in their 4–0 win over Rangers on 27 December 2014, where he provided assists for Hibs' third and fourth goals and won the Man of the Match award. Allan helped Hibernian finish in second place ahead of Rangers, although Hibernian lost to them in the promotion play-offs. He did finish the season by being named the PFA Scotland Player of the Year for the Championship.

During the summer of 2015, Rangers made three transfer bids for Allan, the latter offer being for around £280,000. Although Allan also submitted a transfer request, Hibernian turned down all these bids as they were reluctant to sell him to their main rivals for promotion. A bid of £375,000 from Rotherham United was also turned down by Hibs. Celtic were then reported as expressing an interest in signing Allan, and Hibs subsequently agreed a 'cash plus player' deal with Celtic, with Liam Henderson moving on loan in the opposite direction.

=== Celtic ===
==== 2015–16 ====
On 14 August 2015, Allan signed a four-year deal with Scottish Premiership champions Celtic. He made his debut on 22 August, coming on as a substitute during the second half of Celtic's 3–1 league win away at Dundee United. Allan made his Celtic Park debut, with 10 minutes remaining, in a 3–1 defeat of St Johnstone a week later. He made his first start on 10 December, playing 73 minutes in a 1–1 draw at Fenerbahçe in the UEFA Europa League. Allan did not make his first league start for Celtic until 26 February, in a 1–1 draw at Hamilton Academical. His only other start for the team was a defeat at St Johnstone on 11 May.

Despite being mainly used as substitute throughout his first season, Allan managed to register assists in wins at Inverness Caledonian Thistle on 29 November and Stranraer on 11 January, and also made three more assists at home to Hamilton on 19 January and Inverness on 20 February. Allan made 17 appearances in all competitions for Celtic during the 2015–16 season. His 13 appearances in the league were enough to qualify him for a winner's medal, after Celtic won the Scottish Premiership title.

==== 2016–17: Rotherham loan ====
Allan was loaned to EFL Championship team Rotherham United for the 2016–17 season. The move did not go well for Allan; he was dropped from the team in October 2016 with manager Alan Stubbs publicly criticising the player for lack of effort. Allan only played in a further three games after that, before returning to Celtic at the end of the season.

==== 2017–18: Dundee and Hibernian loans ====
Allan joined Dundee in June 2017, signing on a loan deal that was due to run for the whole of the 2017/18 season. He made his debut on 18 July in a 2–1 win over Raith Rovers in the Scottish League Cup, providing assists for both Dundee goals. His loan to Dundee was curtailed in January 2018, as Dundee, Celtic and Hibernian exchanged three players.

On 31 January 2018, Allan signed for Hibernian for a second time, joining on loan until the end of the 2017–18 season. In his first game back with Hibs on 3 February 2018, he won the penalty which led to their winning goal in a 2–1 victory over Rangers at Ibrox. He scored the first goal of his second spell with Hibs on 9 March, in a 2–0 Edinburgh derby win against Hearts.

==== 2018–19 ====
Allan did not play in a competitive match for Celtic during the first part of the 2018–19 season, only appearing in pre-season friendlies and reserve team matches. He signed a pre-contract agreement with Hibernian in January 2019.

=== Hibernian (third spell) ===
Allan returned to Hibernian during the summer of 2019, having agreed a three-year contract with the club. He scored the winning goal in his first league appearance since signing, against St Mirren on 3 August.

During the early part of the 2020–21 season Allan was unable to play or train due to an unspecified medical issue. He resumed training in early December, although manager Jack Ross would not put a timescale on Allan playing in a match. On 23 January, Allan made his first appearance for Hibs after five months out of the team. Allan later said that he had been diagnosed with hypertrophic cardiomyopathy, a heart condition that caused tiredness and shortage of breath.

On 27 March 2021, Allan joined Inverness CT on loan for the rest of the 2020–21 season.

Allan returned to Hibs for the 2021–22 season, but made only six starts and was released at the end of his contract. Over his three spells at Easter Road, he made 129 appearances in all competitions and scored 17 goals.

=== Arbroath ===
Having expressed his worry that he was being overlooked by clubs as a potential signing due to his physical problems, Allan signed for Scottish Championship side Arbroath on 17 August 2022, on a two-year deal.

==== Larne (loan) ====
On 23 August 2023, after failing to nail down a regular place at Gayfield, Allan joined Northern Irish club and reigning NIFL Premiership champions Larne on a season-long loan. Allan was an unused substitute in the County Antrim Shield final in which Larne defeated Glentoran. Despite being unavailable for the majority of the season, Allan came on as a substitute and scored in Larne's final league game of the season in a 5–0 win over Coleraine which saw them confirmed as champions.

=== Kelty Hearts ===
After leaving Arbroath in the summer, Allan joined Scottish League One club Kelty Hearts on a permanent deal in July 2024 as both a player and the first team coach under manager Michael Tidser. Allan made his competitive debut on 16 July in a Scottish League Cup group stage game away to Elgin City. Allan scored his first goal for the club in the first minute of a league win at home against Stenhousemuir. Allan also scored the following week in an away win over former club Arbroath. In their end-of-season squad update, Kelty announced that Allan was departing the club.

In July 2025, Allan announced his retirement from playing football and that he had joined Scottish League Two club East Kilbride as the side's first-team coach.

== International career ==
Allan played youth football for Scotland. He made his debut for the Scotland national under-21 football team on 10 August 2011, against Norway.

== Personal life ==
Shortly after joining Dundee United as a youth, Allan was diagnosed with Type 1 Diabetes. He requires daily insulin injections, but the condition has not unduly hindered his football career.

Allan was charged with assault in November 2010 after an incident in Glasgow which left two men needing hospital treatment. Charges against him were dropped on the basis of insufficient evidence, although three other men involved in the incident were convicted.

== Career statistics ==
As of 26 April 2025

Appearances and goals by club, season and competition
Club	Season	League			National cup (Note: Includes Scottish Cup, FA Cup)		League cup (Note: Includes Scottish League Cup, EFL Cup)		Other		Total	
Club	Season	Division	Apps	Goals	Apps	Goals	Apps	Goals	Apps	Goals	Apps	Goals
Dundee United	2010–11	Scottish Premier League	0	0	0	0	0	0	0	0	0	0
Dundee United	2011–12	Scottish Premier League	8	0	—		0	0	1 (Note: Appearance(s) in Europa League)	0	9	0
Dundee United	Total		8	0	0	0	0	0	1	0	9	0
Forfar Athletic (loan)	2010–11	Scottish Second Division	3	1	—		—		—		3	1
West Bromwich Albion	2011–12	Premier League	0	0	0	0	—		—		0	0
West Bromwich Albion	2012–13	Premier League	0	0	0	0	0	0	—		0	0
West Bromwich Albion	2013–14	Premier League	0	0	—		—		—		0	0
West Bromwich Albion	Total		0	0	0	0	0	0	0	0	0	0
Portsmouth (loan)	2011–12	Championship	15	1	—		—		—		15	1
Milton Keynes Dons (loan)	2012–13	League One	4	0	—		—		—		4	0
Portsmouth (loan)	2012–13	League One	9	1	1	0	—		—		10	1
Birmingham City (loan)	2013–14	Championship	5	0	0	0	2	2	—		7	2
Hibernian	2014–15	Scottish Championship	32	2	4	0	3	0	3 (Note: Appearances in Scottish Premiership play-offs)	0	42	2
Hibernian	2015–16	Scottish Championship	1	0	—		1	1	1 (Note: Appearance(s) in Scottish Challenge Cup)	0	3	1
Hibernian	Total		33	2	4	0	4	1	4	0	45	3
Celtic	2015–16	Scottish Premiership	13	0	2	0	—		2	0	17	0
Celtic	2016–17	Scottish Premiership	0	0	—		—		0	0	0	0
Celtic	2017–18	Scottish Premiership	0	0	—		—		—		0	0
Celtic	2018–19	Scottish Premiership	0	0	0	0	0	0	0	0	0	0
Celtic	Total		13	0	2	0	0	0	2	0	17	0
Rotherham United (loan)	2016–17	Championship	10	0	0	0	1	0	—		11	0
Dundee (loan)	2017–18	Scottish Premiership	16	0	2	1	5	0	—		23	1
Hibernian (loan)	2017–18	Scottish Premiership	12	3	—		—		—		12	3
Hibernian	2019–20	Scottish Premiership	30	5	3	2	7	3	—		40	10
Hibernian	2020–21	Scottish Premiership	8	0	0	0	1	0	—		9	0
Hibernian	2021–22	Scottish Premiership	17	0	1	0	3	1	2 (Note: Appearances in Conference League)	0	23	1
Hibernian	Total		55	5	4	2	11	4	2	0	72	11
Inverness Caledonian Thistle (loan)	2020–21	Scottish Championship	6	0	2	0	0	0	—		8	0
Arbroath	2022–23	Scottish Championship	16	0	1	0	1	0	1	0	19	0
Arbroath	2023–24	Scottish Championship	0	0	0	0	3	0	0	0	3	0
Arbroath	Total		16	0	1	0	4	0	1	0	22	0
Larne (loan)	2023–24	NIFL Premiership	6	1	0	0	1	0	2 (Note: Appearance(s) in County Antrim Shield)	0	9	1
Kelty Hearts	2024–25	Scottish League One	18	2	0	0	4	0	0	0	22	2
Career total			229	16	16	3	32	7	12	0	289	26

== Honours ==
Celtic

- Scottish Premiership: 2015–16

Larne

- NIFL Premiership: 2023–24
- County Antrim Shield: 2023–24

Kelty Hearts

- East of Scotland Cup: 2024–25

Individual

- PFA Scotland Team of the Year: 2014–15 Championship
- PFA Scotland Players' Player of the Year: 2014–15 Championship
