= Florent Hoti =

Association football player

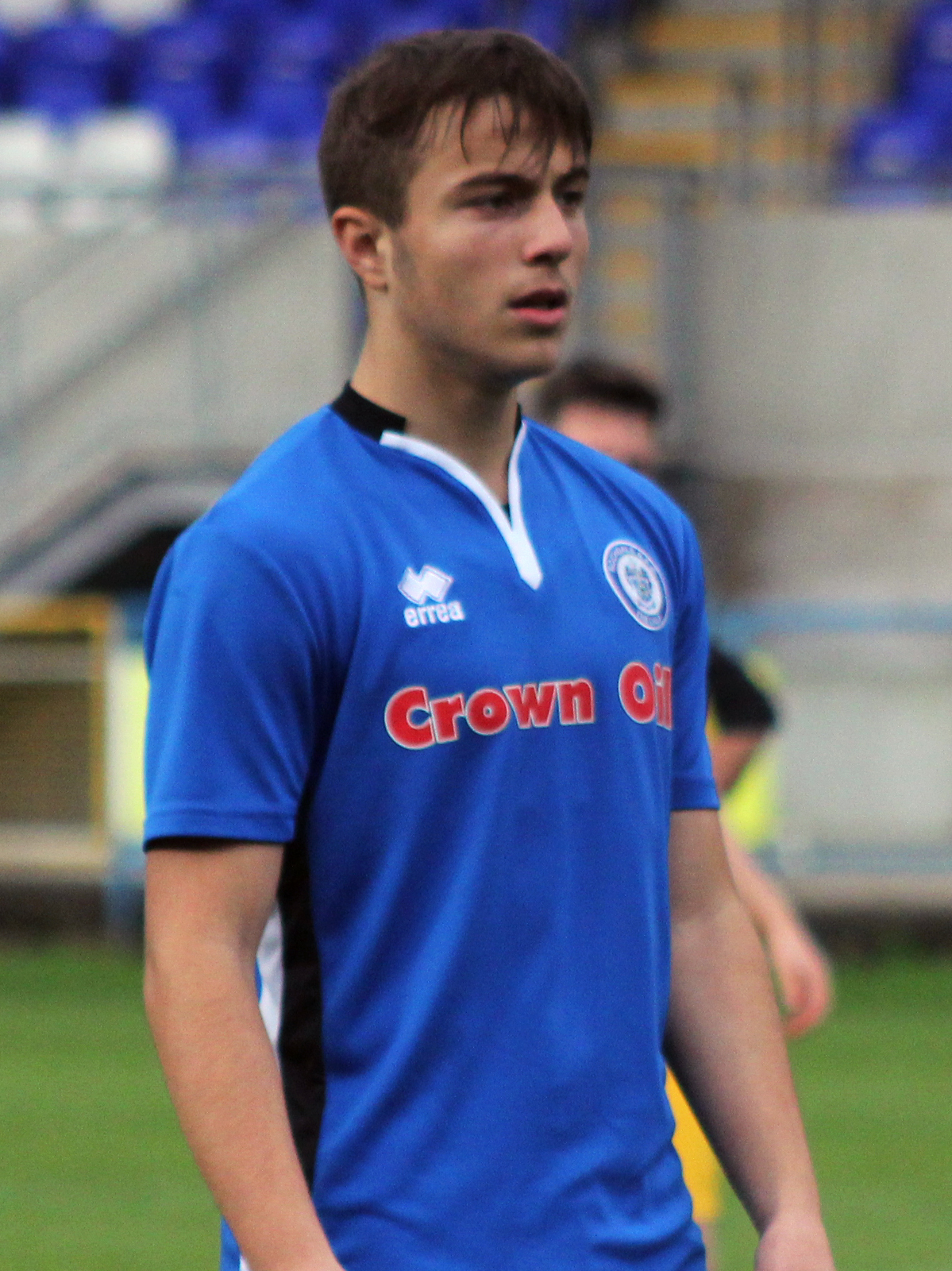
- Hoti playing for Rochdale U18 in October 2017

Personal information
- Full name: Florent Hoti
- Date of birth: 11 December 2000 (age 25)
- Place of birth: Manchester, England
- Height: 6 ft 0 in (1.82 m)
- Position: Midfielder

Team information
- Current team: Solihull Moors
- Number: 25

Youth career
- 2011–2018: Rochdale

Senior career*
Years	Team	Apps	(Gls)
2018–2019	Rochdale	0	(0)
2020–2022	Dundee United	9	(0)
2020–2021	→ Forfar Athletic (loan)	6	(0)
2022–2023	Arbroath	5	(0)
2023	Tranmere Rovers	5	(0)
2023–2026	FC Halifax Town	72	(12)
2026–	Solihull Moors FC	1	(0)

International career
2021–2022	Kosovo U21	7	(0)
- * Club domestic league appearances and goals as of 12:33, 30 September 2026 (UTC)

Florent Hoti (born 11 December 2000) is a professional footballer who plays as a midfielder for Solihull Moors. He has previously also played for Halifax, Rochdale, Dundee United and Arbroath, and had a loan spell at Forfar Athletic. Born in England, he is a youth international for Kosovo.

== Club career ==
=== Early career ===
Having been part of Rochdale's academy since the age of 10, Hoti signed for the club on a two-year scholarship in 2017. He made his debut for Rochdale on 4 September 2018, coming on as a 79th minute substitute in a 2–1 home victory against Bury in the EFL Trophy. On 7 November 2018, he started in Rochdale's 2–2 draw at home to Leicester City Under-23s in the EFL Trophy. Hoti was offered his first professional contract with the club at the end of the 2018–19 season, though Hoti never signed this contract.

=== Playing in Scotland ===
Hoti had a trial at Scottish Premiership club Dundee United during the 2019–20 season, and again in August 2020, and signed a two-year contract with the club for an undisclosed fee the following month. He joined Scottish League One club Forfar Athletic on loan in October, then returned to Dundee United in January 2021 following the suspension of the lower divisions due to the COVID-19 pandemic. He made his debut for Dundee United on 10 April 2021 in a 1–0 Scottish Premiership win away to Hamilton Academical, with Dundee United manager Micky Mellon stating that "he has come on and showed what a lad of great promise he is." He made three further appearances in the 2020–21 season. He was released at the end of the 2021–22 season, having played just 9 times that season after failing to displace the club's regular midfielders such as Jeando Fuchs, Calum Butcher and Ian Harkes.

After a trial spell with Scottish League One club Peterhead, during which he played twice, Hoti signed for Scottish Championship side Arbroath on a short-term deal on 11 November 2022. On 25 January 2023, Arbroath confirmed that Florent had left the club, with Hoti having made 7 appearances for them.

=== Return to England ===
In March 2023, Hoti joined EFL League Two side Tranmere Rovers on a short-term deal after a successful trial. He was released at the end of the season, having made 5 appearances for the club.

On 18 July 2023, Hoti joined National League club FC Halifax Town on a two-year deal after a successful trial. Hoti had suffered a hamstring injury during his trial which left him injured for the start of the season, and he made his debut for the club on 26 September 2023 as a substitute in a 0–0 draw with Dagenham & Redbridge. He made his full debut for the club in the following match, and scored his first career goal, as Halifax were defeated 3–2 by Eastleigh on 30 September. He suffered a shoulder injury in a 2–2 draw against AFC Fylde on 21 November, which he returned from for Halifax's opening match of 2024, a 0–0 draw with Altrincham. He played 25 times, scoring 5 goals during the 2023–24 National League, as Halifax finished 7th and qualified for the National League play-offs. Hoti scored as a substitute in Halifax's play-off quarter-final tie against Solihull Moors but the club were knocked out of the play-offs after losing 4–2.

At the end of the 2024–25 season, Halifax triggered an option in Hoti's contract to extend it by a further year. Hoti sustained a knee injury in Halifax's final pre-season match ahead of the 2025–26 season, which left him injured for "several months" and led to him having surgery.

On 5 May 2026, Halifax announced they would be releasing the player.

On 26 September 2026, Hoti joined National League club Solihull Moors on a short-term deal until 29 October.

== International career ==
Hoti was selected to participate in an Albania national under-21 team's training camp and practice matches in March 2021, but was unable to join the squad due to COVID-related travel restrictions. Two months later, he received a call-up from Kosovo national under-21 team for a 2023 UEFA European Under-21 Championship qualification match against Andorra U21, and made his debut after being named in the starting line-up. Hoti made 7 appearances in total for Kosovo U21.

== Style of play ==
Hoti is a midfielder and has described himself as a "technical midfielder with flair". Upon signing for Halifax, Hoti claimed "I'm best when I'm on the ball but I have the other side to my game as well where I'm not afraid to put a tackle in and do the dirty work".

== Personal life ==
Hoti was born in Manchester, England, to Kosovo-Albanian parents from the Hoti tribe. This makes him eligible to represent all three nations of England, Albania and Kosovo internationally. Hoti also grew up in Manchester and supported Manchester United.

== Career statistics ==
As of end of 2024-25 season

Appearances and goals by club, season and competition
Club	Season	League			National cup (Note: Includes FA Cup, Scottish Cup)		League cup (Note: Includes EFL Cup, Scottish League Cup)		Other		Total	
Club	Season	Division	Apps	Goals	Apps	Goals	Apps	Goals	Apps	Goals	Apps	Goals
Rochdale	2018–19	EFL League One	0	0	0	0	0	0	2 (Note: Appearance(s) in EFL Trophy)	0	2	0
Rochdale	2019–20	EFL League One	0	0	0	0	0	0	0	0	0	0
Rochdale	Total		0	0	0	0	0	0	2	0	2	0
Dundee United	2020–21	Scottish Premiership	4	0	0	0	0	0	0	0	4	0
Dundee United	2021–22	Scottish Premiership	5	0	0	0	4	0	0	0	9	0
Dundee United	Total		9	0	0	0	4	0	0	0	13	0
Forfar Athletic (loan)	2020–21	Scottish League One	6	0	1	0	2	0	0	0	9	0
Arbroath	2022–23	Scottish Championship	5	0	1	0	1	0	0	0	7	0
Tranmere Rovers	2022–23	EFL League Two	5	0	0	0	0	0	0	0	5	0
FC Halifax Town	2023–24	National League	25	5	0	0	—		1 (Note: Appearance(s) in National League play-offs)	1	26	6
FC Halifax Town	2024–25	National League	37	5	0	0	—		4 (Note: One appearance in National League play-offs, one appearance in FA Trophy, two appearances in National League Cup)	0	41	5
FC Halifax Town	2025–26	National League	0	0	0	0	—		0	0	0	0
FC Halifax Town	Total		62	10	0	0	0	0	5	1	67	11
Career total			87	10	2	0	7	0	7	1	103	11
