= Thomas O'Brien (footballer) =

Scottish footballer

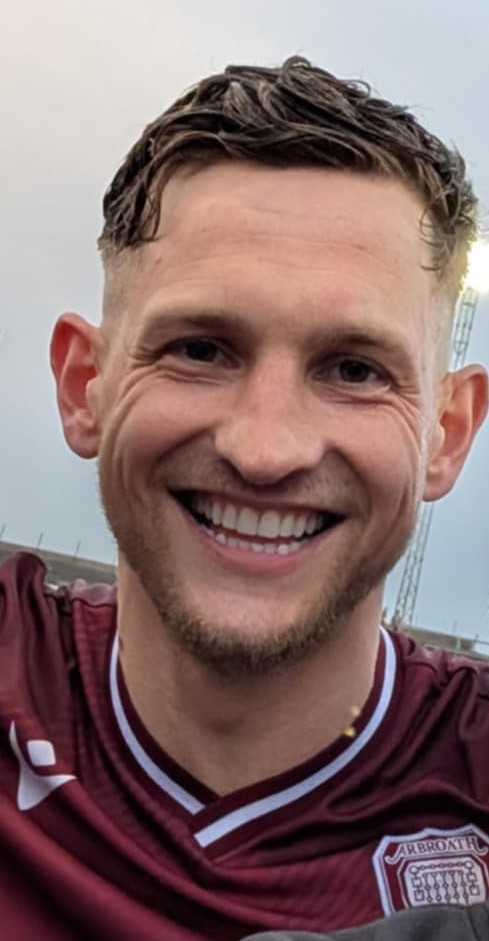
- Thomas O’Brien in 2025.

Personal information
- Full name: Thomas Alexander O'Brien
- Date of birth: 7 August 1991 (age 35)
- Place of birth: Dunfermline, Scotland
- Position: Centre-back

Team information
- Current team: Arbroath
- Number: 5

Youth career
- Dunfermline
- 2003–2008: Cowdenbeath

Senior career*
Years	Team	Apps	(Gls)
2009–2015	Cowdenbeath	114	(2)
2009	→ Rosyth (loan)		
2010	→ Kelty Hearts (loan)		
2015–2017	Forfar Athletic	60	(7)
2017–	Arbroath	162	(17)
- * Club domestic league appearances and goals as of 4 May 2026

Thomas 'Tam' O'Brien (born 7 August 1991) is a Scottish footballer who plays as a central defender for Scottish Championship side Arbroath, where he is also club captain

== Career ==
O'Brien began his footballing career at Dunfermline Athletic's Academy, but moved to Cowdenbeath in 2003. He signed professional terms in 2007, and after loan spells with Rosyth and Kelty Hearts, he made his first team debut on 7 August 2010, in a 2–0 home loss against Ross County. O'Brien scored his first professional goal on 1 October 2011, in a 1–1 away draw against Arbroath.

At the end of the 2014–15 season, O'Brien signed a two-year contract with Scottish League One side Forfar Athletic. He spent two seasons with Forfar, and was named in the 2016–17 PFA Scotland League Two Team of the Year after helping his club return to League One.

O'Brien subsequently signed a two-year deal with Angus rivals Arbroath on 1 June 2017.

In 2019, O'Brien was part of the Arbroath squad that won the Scottish League One title, gaining promotion to the Scottish Championship. The Lichties would remain in the second tier for five seasons, the last three of which were spent as the only part-time club in the division, with O'Brien ever-present throughout much of this time. This included a memorable promotion challenge in season 2021-22, with Arbroath eventually succumbing to champions Kilmarnock on the penultimate matchday. Persistent injuries in the 2023–24 season limited O'Brien to just 19 league appearances, as Arbroath were relegated from the Championship.

In April 2025, O'Brien captained Arbroath to the Scottish League One title with three games to spare, following a 4-0 victory over Stenhousemuir that secured an immediate return to the Championship.

== Career statistics ==
As of 5 May 2023

Appearances and goals by club, season and competition
Club	Season	League			Scottish Cup		League Cup		Other		Total	
Club	Season	Division	Apps	Goals	Apps	Goals	Apps	Goals	Apps	Goals	Apps	Goals
Cowdenbeath	2010–11	Scottish First Division	13	0	0	0	1	0	3 (Note: One appearance in the Scottish Challenge Cup and two appearances in the Scottish First Division play-offs)	0	17	0
Cowdenbeath	2011–12	Scottish Second Division	16	1	1	0	0	0	0	0	17	1
Cowdenbeath	2012–13	Scottish First Division	30	0	1	0	1	0	4 (Note: Appearances in the Scottish Challenge Cup)	0	36	0
Cowdenbeath	2013–14	Scottish Championship	24	1	1	0	1	0	5 (Note: One appearance in the Scottish Challenge Cup and four appearances and three goals in the Scottish Championship play-offs)	3	31	4
Cowdenbeath	2014–15	Scottish Championship	31	0	1	0	1	0	1	0	34	0
Cowdenbeath	Total		114	2	4	0	4	0	13	3	135	5
Forfar Athletic	2015–16	Scottish League One	26	0	3	0	1	0	2	0	32	0
Forfar Athletic	2016–17	Scottish League Two	34	7	1	0	3	1	6 (Note: Two appearances in the Scottish Challenge Cup and four appearances in the Scottish League One play-offs)	0	44	8
Forfar Athletic	Total		60	7	4	0	4	1	8	0	76	8
Arbroath	2017–18	Scottish League One	33	3	2	0	4	0	3 (Note: One appearance in the Scottish Challenge Cup and two appearances in the Scottish Championship play-offs)	0	42	3
Arbroath	2018–19	Scottish League One	32	2	1	0	3	1	3	1	39	4
Arbroath	2019–20	Scottish Championship	25	0	4	0	4	0	2	0	35	0
Arbroath	2020–21	Scottish Championship	26	2	1	0	4	2	0	0	31	4
Arbroath	2021–22	Scottish Championship	35	3	3	0	2	1	3 (Note: One appearance in the Scottish Challenge Cup and two appearances in the Scottish Premiership play-offs)	0	43	4
Arbroath	2022–23	Scottish Championship	29	2	2	0	4	0	1	1	36	3
Arbroath	2023–24	Scottish Championship	0	0	0	0	0	0	0	0	0	0
Arbroath	Total		180	12	13	0	21	4	12	2	226	18
Career total			354	21	21	0	29	5	32	5	437	31

== Honours ==
=== Club ===
Cowdenbeath

- Scottish Second Division: 2011–12

Arbroath

- Scottish League One: 2018–19

=== Individual ===
- Scottish League Two Player of the Month: September 2016
- PFA Scotland Scottish League Two Team of the Year: 2016–17
- PFA Scotland Scottish League One Team of the Year: 2017–18, 2018–19
- PFA Scotland Scottish Championship Team of the Year: 2022–23
