= Scott Stewart (footballer) =

Scottish footballer

Personal information
- Full name: Scott Alexander Stewart
- Date of birth: 29 April 1996 (age 30)
- Place of birth: Edinburgh, Scotland
- Height: 1.85 m (6 ft 1 in)
- Positions: Full-back; midfielder

Team information
- Current team: Arbroath
- Number: 12

Youth career
- Airdrie United

Senior career*
| Years | Team | Apps | (Gls) |
| 2013–2019 | Airdrieonians | 131 | (12) |
| 2019– | Arbroath | 196 | (13) |
- * Club domestic league appearances and goals as of 4 May 2026

Scott Alexander Stewart (born 29 April 1996) is a Scottish footballer who plays for Scottish Championship club Arbroath as a full-back or midfielder. He began his career at Airdrieonians.

== Career ==
=== Airdrieonians ===
Stewart was born in Edinburgh but raised in Rutherglen, South Lanarkshire where he attended Stonelaw High School. His father Sandy was a footballer who spent the majority of his career with the original Airdrieonians club and also served as player and manager at its successor Airdrie United, where Scott began his career in the youth setup.

At the age of 17, Stewart received his first call-up to the senior squad at the club (now renamed Airdrieonians) in August 2013, making his senior debut two months later in a 2–0 home defeat to Forfar Athletic in Scottish League One, with his first start in the competition against Stranraer in March 2014. He initially began his career as a midfielder but retrained as a full-back, which he stated drew more scrutiny on his performances from his father, who had played the same position. After three seasons as a squad member, he became a regular starter for the Diamonds in the 2016–17 campaign, going on to make over 100 appearances over the next three years, including a promotion playoff semi-final defeat to Alloa Athletic on penalties in 2017 (the closest Airdrie came to either being promoted or relegated in his time with the club) and a Scottish Cup visit to holders Celtic in 2019.

He was voted the Airdrieonians 'Young Player of the Year' for 2016–17 and the overall 'Player of the Year' for 2017–18, having been named team captain in the latter part of that season and agreed a new contract to stay at the club.

=== Arbroath ===
In June 2019, Stewart transferred to Arbroath, newly promoted to the Scottish Championship. He made his debut for the club on 23 July 2019, in a 3–0 defeat away to Hibernian in the group stage of the 2019–20 Scottish League Cup. He was an important member of the Red Lichties team in their bid for promotion to the Scottish Premiership in the 2021–22 season, while also working as a P.E. teacher at Rutherglen's Trinity High School. The club narrowly avoided relegation in 2022–23 but finished bottom of the division in 2023–24. They bounced back immediately as winners of 2024–25 Scottish League One, with Stewart named in the Team of the Season.
