= Ali Adams =

Scottish association football player

Personal information
- Full name: Alasdair Adams
- Date of birth: 6 November 1991 (age 34)
- Place of birth: Edinburgh, Scotland
- Height: 1.88 m (6 ft 2 in)
- Position: Goalkeeper

Youth career
- Hibernian
- Leith Athletic

Senior career*
| Years | Team | Apps | (Gls) |
| 2018–2019 | Berwick Rangers | 2 | (0) |
| 2020 | Tranent Juniors | 2 | (1) |
| 2020–2021 | East Fife | 0 | (0) |
| 2021–2023 | Musselburgh Athletic | | |
| 2023–2024 | Arbroath | 2 | (1) |
| 2024- | East Fife | 0 | (0) |
- * Club domestic league appearances and goals

Alasdair Adams (born 6 November 1991) is a Scottish former professional footballer who played as a goalkeeper. He was used as a striker for Arbroath once and scored an equaliser wonder goal versus Raith Rovers away at Starks park in 2023–24 season.

== Career ==
Adams has had spells with Berwick Rangers and East Fife in the Scottish leagues. He also used to play for Tranent Juniors and scored a goal for the club in 2020, described as a 55-yard free kick. Adams joined Arbroath in the summer of 2023 from Musselburgh Athletic.

Adams made headlines whilst playing for Arbroath in the Scottish Championship on 30 December 2023. He was used as a makeshift outfield substitute against Raith Rovers and, unusually for a goalkeeper, scored with a 30-yard long-range half volley. His side came back from a 2–0 deficit to ultimately draw 2–2. He was awarded the SPFL Goal of the Month for the strike.

He rejoined East Fife on a one-year deal in the summer of 2024.

== Personal life ==
Adams has also worked as a personal trainer.
