= Kyle Robinson =

Irish footballer (born 2002)

Personal information
- Full name: Kyle Robinson
- Date of birth: 8 November 2002 (age 24)
- Place of birth: Dublin, Ireland
- Position: Forward

Team information
- Current team: Harland & Wolff Welders

Youth career
- Esker Celtic
- St Kevin's Boys
- Home Farm
- –2018: Leixlip United
- 2018–2019: Drogheda United
- 2019–2022: St Patrick's Athletic

Senior career*
Years	Team	Apps	(Gls)
2019–2022	St Patrick's Athletic	7	(1)
2021	→ Wexford (loan)	25	(9)
2023	Shelbourne	16	(0)
2023	Drogheda United	12	(4)
2024	Arbroath	10	(0)
2024–2025	Athlone Town	36	(10)
2025–2026	Longford Town	14	(0)
2026–	Harland & Wolff Welders	0	(0)

International career^{‡}
2022	Republic of Ireland U20	1	(0)
- * Club domestic league appearances and goals as of 23:14, 1 June 2026 (UTC) ‡ National team caps and goals as of 11:19, 15 January 2026 (UTC)

Kyle Robinson (born 8 November 2002) is an Irish professional footballer who plays as a forward for NIFL Championship side Harland & Wolff Welders. His previous clubs are St Patrick's Athletic, Wexford, Shelbourne, Drogheda United, Arbroath, Athlone Town and Longford Town.

== Career ==
=== Youth career ===
A native of Lucan, Dublin, Robinson began playing with local side Esker Celtic, before spells at St Kevin's Boys, Home Farm and Leixlip United, where he earned a move to the academy of League of Ireland club Drogheda United where he played from 2018 to July 2019, when he moved to St Patrick's Athletic.

=== St Patrick's Athletic ===
==== 2019 season ====
On 15 September 2019, Robinson made his senior debut for St Patrick's Athletic, replacing Gary Shaw from the bench in the 85th minute of a 1–0 win away to Cabinteely in the Leinster Senior Cup. His first senior goal came on 1 November 2019, when he came off the bench to put his side in front, in a 3–1 win away to Sheriff YC in the Semi Final of the Leinster Senior Cup. On 16 November 2019, his impressive form in the competition culminated with him scoring the opening goal of the game in the Final of the 2018–19 Leinster Senior Cup, as his side defeated Athlone Town 4–0 at Richmond Park.

==== Wexford loan ====
After signing his first professional contract with St Patrick's Athletic in January 2021, it was announced on 26 February 2021 that Robinson had signed for League of Ireland First Division side Wexford on a season long loan. His first goal for the club came on 16 April 2021 when he scored a late consolation goal in a 2–1 loss to Cobh Ramblers. On 2 July 2021, he scored a hat-trick in a 4–4 draw with Athlone Town. He finished an impressive loan season with 10 goals in 26 appearances in all competitions despite his side finishing bottom of the league.

==== Return from loan ====
Upon returning from his loan spell, Robinson was fully integrated into the first team squad for the 2022 season by manager Tim Clancy. On 6 May 2022, Robinson made his League of Ireland Premier Division debut for the club, replacing Ben McCormack in the 85th minute of a 4–0 win away to Drogheda United and scoring with his first touch of the ball. He made a further 6 appearances off the bench that season before being released at the end of his contract at the end of the season.

=== Shelbourne ===
Ahead of their 2023 season, Robinson signed for League of Ireland Premier Division side Shelbourne. His first goal for the club came in a 4–0 win away to Dundalk in the Leinster Senior Cup. He struggled for starts in the league, starting in just 2 of his 16 league appearances and failing to score a league goal for the club, although he scored 4 goals in 3 games in the Leinster Senior Cup, before being deemed surplus to requirements in the summer transfer window.

=== Drogheda United ===
On 13 July 2023, Robinson signed for Drogheda United until the end of the season, a club where he had previously spent 2 seasons as a youth player. On 18 August 2023, he scored his first goal for the club, in a 1–0 FAI Cup win away to Kerry. On 1 September 2023, he scored twice in a 3–0 win over UCD at United Park, the second of which being a volley from 45 yards. He finished the season with 5 goals in 15 appearances for the club in all competitions.

=== Arbroath ===
On 12 January 2024, Robinson signed for Scottish Championship side Arbroath until the end of the 2023–24 season. He made his debut the following day, coming off the bench in the 40th minute of a 0–0 draw with Ayr United at Gayfield Park. He was released at the end of the season after failing to score in his 10 appearances with the club.

=== Athlone Town ===
On 4 July 2024, it was announced that Robinson had signed for League of Ireland First Division club Athlone Town. He made his debut on the same day, scoring the winner from the penalty spot in a 2–1 victory away to UCD. On 11 October 2024, he scored a hattrick in a 4–1 win over Cork City. On 24 July 2025, Athlone confirmed that Robinson had departed the club after scoring 14 goals in 46 appearances in all competitions during his time there.

=== Longford Town ===
On 26 July 2025, Robinson signed for Athlone's midlands rivals Longford Town, making his debut the same day, in Longford's 2–1 defeat at home to Bray Wanderers.

=== Harland & Wolff Welders ===
Robinson signed for NIFL Championship club Harland & Wolff Welders ahead of the 2026–27 season.

== International career ==
On 22 March 2022, Robinson made his first appearance in underage international football, replacing Tom Cannon from the bench for the Republic of Ireland U20 in the 71st minute of a friendly against the Republic of Ireland Amateur side at Whitehall Stadium.

== Career statistics ==
As of match played on 6 April 2026

Appearances and goals by club, season and competition
Club	Season	League			National Cup (Note: Includes FAI Cup, Scottish Cup & Irish Cup)		League Cup (Note: Includes League of Ireland Cup, Scottish League Cup & Northern Ireland Football League Cup)		Europe		Other		Total	
Club	Season	Division	Apps	Goals	Apps	Goals	Apps	Goals	Apps	Goals	Apps	Goals	Apps	Goals
St Patrick's Athletic	2019	LOI Premier Division	0	0	0	0	0	0	0 (Note: Appearance(s) in the UEFA Europa League)	0	3 (Note: Appearance(s) in the Leinster Senior Cup)	2	3	2
St Patrick's Athletic	2020	LOI Premier Division	0	0	0	0	—		—		—		0	0
St Patrick's Athletic	2021	LOI Premier Division	0	0	—		—		—		—		0	0
St Patrick's Athletic	2022	LOI Premier Division	7	1	0	0	—		0 (Note: Appearance(s) in the UEFA Europa Conference League)	0	0 (Note: Appearance in the President of Ireland's Cup)	0	7	1
St Patrick's Athletic	Total		7	1	0	0	0	0	0	0	3	2	10	3
Wexford (loan)	2021	LOI First Division	25	9	1	1	—		—		—		26	10
Shelbourne	2023	LOI Premier Division	16	0	—		—		—		3	4	19	4
Drogheda United	2023	LOI Premier Division	12	4	3	1	—		—		—		15	5
Arbroath	2023–24	Scottish Championship	10	0	0	0	—		—		—		10	0
Athlone Town	2024	LOI First Division	15	7	3	0	—		—		3 (Note: Appearances in the 2024 League of Ireland Promotion/Relegation play-offs)	0	21	7
Athlone Town	2025	LOI First Division	21	3	1	0	—		—		3	4	25	7
Athlone Town	Total		36	10	4	0	–		–		6	4	46	14
Longford Town	2025	LOI First Division	9	0	—		—		—		—		9	0
Longford Town	2026	LOI First Division	5	0	—		—		—		2	0	7	0
Longford Town	Total		14	0	–		–		–		2	0	16	0
Harland & Wolff Welders	2026–27	NIFL Championship	0	0	0	0	0	0	—		0	0	0	0
Total			120	24	8	2	0	0	0	0	14	10	142	36

== Honours ==
St Patrick's Athletic

- Leinster Senior Cup (1): 2018–19
