= Liam Harvey =

Scottish footballer (born 2005)

Personal information
- Date of birth: 20 January 2005 (age 21)
- Place of birth: Elgin, Scotland
- Position: Striker

Team information
- Current team: Lossiemouth

Youth career
- 2016–2024: Aberdeen

Senior career*
Years	Team	Apps	(Gls)
2022–2024	Aberdeen	2	(0)
2023–2024	→ Elgin City (loan)	18	(2)
2024–2025	Buckie Thistle		
2025	→ Lossiemouth (loan)		
2025–	Lossiemouth		

International career^{‡}
2020–2022	Scotland U17		
- * Club domestic league appearances and goals as of 13:44, 12 January 2024 ‡ National team caps and goals as of 29 March 2022

Liam Harvey (born 20 January 2005) is a Scottish professional footballer who plays as a striker for Highland League club Lossiemouth.

== Club career ==
Harvey was produced by the Aberdeen youth system, starting with their under-11 side. He made his senior debut for Aberdeen on 11 May 2022, coming on as a second-half substitute in a 1–0 League loss against St Johnstone.

In January 2024, Harvey signed for Highland League club Buckie Thistle.

Harvey signed a four-year deal with Lossiemouth after a previous loan spell.

== International career ==
Harvey represented Scotland at Under 17s youth level. He was called up for the Under 17 European Championships in 2022, but was withdrawn due to a striker shortage at Aberdeen.
