= Charlie Reilly (footballer) =

Scottish footballer (born 2001)

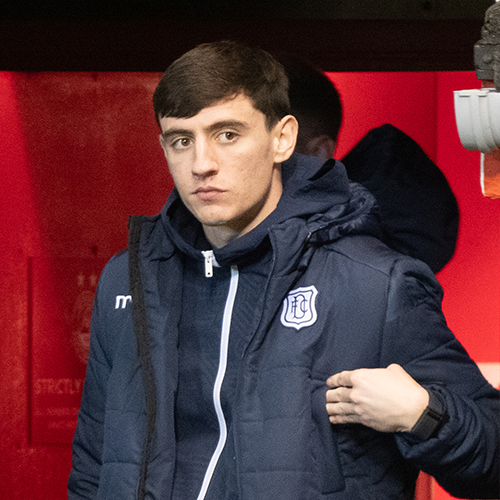
- Reilly in 2024

Personal information
- Date of birth: 5 December 2001 (age 24)
- Place of birth: Glasgow, Scotland
- Positions: Winger; midfielder

Team information
- Current team: Dundee
- Number: 18

Youth career
- 2011–2020: Hamilton Academical

Senior career*
Years	Team	Apps	(Gls)
2018–2020	Hamilton Academical	0	(0)
2019	→ Airdrieonians (loan)	6	(0)
2020–2021	Partick Thistle	2	(0)
2021–2023	Albion Rovers	62	(28)
2023–	Dundee	43	(2)
2024	→ Arbroath (loan)	5	(0)
2024	→ Inverness Caledonian Thistle (loan)	1	(0)
- * Club domestic league appearances and goals as of 21:55, 21 November 2026 (UTC)

Charlie Reilly (born 5 December 2001) is a Scottish professional footballer who plays as a winger or midfielder for Dundee. He has previously played for Hamilton Academical, Partick Thistle and Albion Rovers, as well as having been on loan with Airdrieonians, Arbroath and Inverness Caledonian Thistle.

== Youth career ==
Reilly joined the Hamilton Academical Youth Academy at the age of 9 and would play at every age group in his nine years there. He was a member of Accies' unbeaten Under-17 team which won their Elite Youth League during the 2017–18 season and qualified them to the 2018–19 UEFA Youth League.

Reilly would play both games in their two-legged affair against Swiss side FC Basel which ended with a last-minute equaliser assisted by Reilly, followed by a famous win via penalty shoot-out. Reilly would also play both games in the following round, in which Accies lost to Danish side FC Midtjylland.

== Senior career ==
=== Hamilton Academical ===
Shortly after winning the Elite Youth League, Reilly signed his first professional contract with Hamilton Academical at the age of 16, penning a two-year deal. Reilly made three appearances in the Scottish Challenge Cup with their U20 team over the following two seasons, but never made an appearance for the senior team.

==== Airdrieonians (loan) ====
On 17 August 2019, Reilly joined Scottish League One club Airdrieonians on loan until January 2020. Reilly would make seven appearances while with the Diamonds before returning to his parent club in January 2020. Reilly left Hamilton Accies at the end of his contract in the summer of 2020.

=== Partick Thistle ===
On 1 October 2020, following a successful trial period, Reilly signed a one-year deal with Scottish League One club Partick Thistle. Reilly would make three appearances in total for the Jags that season, and was a part of the squad which won the Scottish League One in the 2020–21 season. Reilly left the club upon the expiry of his contract in the summer of 2021.

=== Albion Rovers ===
In the summer of 2021, Reilly joined Scottish League Two club Albion Rovers on a one-year deal. After making his debut for the Wee Rovers in a Scottish League Cup draw at home to Ayr United, Reilly scored his first goal for the club and his first senior goal in the same competition away to his former club, Hamilton Accies. He would tally 36 appearances and 7 goals in his first season at Cliftonhill, following a shift from his box-to-box midfielder role to further out wide as a winger. At the end of the season, Reilly signed another one-year deal with Rovers to stay the following season.

Reilly would have a stand-out 2022–23 season, scoring 24 goals and providing 19 assists over 39 games for Albion Rovers, and was awarded League Two's player of the month both in November 2022 and in January 2023. Despite immense speculation over his future in January including having supposedly signed a pre-contract agreement with Dundee, Reilly remained with Rovers, with manager Brian Reid saying it would take "something exceptional" to encourage the relegation-threatened side to sell. The success of Reilly's season was such that he was nominated for the PFA Scotland Young Player of the Year award, alongside Celtic players Liel Abada and Matt O'Riley, and Rangers player Malik Tillman. Reilly would also be nominated for and win PFA Scotland's League Two Player of the Year award.

=== Dundee ===
On 8 June 2023, after having trained full-time with the club during his prior season with Albion Rovers, Reilly officially signed for Scottish Premiership club Dundee on a two-year deal. After spending time out with injury, Reilly made his debut off the bench on 2 September in a league game away to St Johnstone.

==== Arbroath (loan) ====
On 23 February 2024, After impressing in short stints for Dundee and fighting intermittent injury issues, Reilly joined Scottish Championship club Arbroath on loan until the end of the season to get regular playing time. He made his debut for the Red Lichties the following day off the bench in a league draw against Inverness Caledonian Thistle.

==== Inverness Caledonian Thistle (loan) ====
On 1 October, after recovering from injuries through the summer and early in the season, Reilly joined Scottish League One club Inverness Caledonian Thistle on loan until January 2025. Reilly made his debut on 5 October in a league game away to his former loan club Arbroath. Shortly after, Reilly picked up another hamstring injury which kept him out for the rest of 2024, and in January 2025 he returned to Dundee after recovering.

==== Return to Dundee ====
Reilly returned to the pitch for Dundee on 26 February 2025, notching an assist in an away league defeat to Motherwell.

On 12 June 2025, Reilly agreed a new one-year deal with Dundee for the 2025–26 season. Any hopes of avoiding more injury woes were dashed 15 minutes into the first friendly of the season, when a foul and awkward fall led to Reilly breaking his collarbone, which required an operation that would keep him out for 6 to 12 weeks. He again returned to the pitch on 20 September as a substitute in a home league win over Livingston, winning the game-sealing penalty. On 30 December, Reilly finally made his first start for Dundee and scored his first goal for the club in a home win over Kilmarnock.

On 25 May 2026, Dundee announced that Reilly had signed a new deal for the 2026–27 season. Reilly began his fourth season at Dens well, scoring 3 goals in their first 2 games.

== Career statistics ==
As of 21 November 2026

Appearances and goals by club, season and competition
Club	Season	League			Scottish Cup		League Cup		Other		Total	
Club	Season	Division	Apps	Goals	Apps	Goals	Apps	Goals	Apps	Goals	Apps	Goals
Hamilton Academical U20	2018–19	—			—		—		1 (Note: Appearances in the Scottish Challenge Cup)	0	1	0
Hamilton Academical U20	2019–20	—			—		—		2	0	2	0
Hamilton Academical U20	Total		0	0	0	0	0	0	3	0	3	0
Airdrieonians (loan)	2019–20	Scottish League One	6	0	1	0	0	0	0	0	7	0
Partick Thistle	2020–21	Scottish League One	2	0	0	0	1	0	0	0	3	0
Albion Rovers	2021–22	Scottish League Two	28	6	3	0	4	1	1	0	36	7
Albion Rovers	2022–23	Scottish League Two	34	22	2	1	4	1	3 (Note: Appearance(s) in the Scottish Challenge Cup and the Scottish League Two play-offs)	0	43	24
Albion Rovers	Total		62	28	5	1	8	2	4	0	79	31
Dundee	2023–24	Scottish Premiership	7	0	1	0	0	0	0	0	8	0
Dundee	2024–25	Scottish Premiership	6	0	1	0	1	0	0	0	8	0
Dundee	2025–26	Scottish Premiership	21	1	2	0	0	0	0	0	23	1
Dundee	2026–27	Scottish Premiership	9	1	0	0	5	3	0	0	14	4
Dundee	Total		43	2	4	0	6	3	0	0	53	5
Dundee B	2025–26	—			—		—		2	0	2	0
Arbroath (loan)	2023–24	Scottish Championship	5	0	—		—		0	0	5	0
Inverness Caledonian Thistle (loan)	2024–25	Scottish League One	1	0	0	0	—		0	0	1	0
Career total			118	30	10	1	15	5	9	0	153	36

== Honours ==
Partick Thistle

- Scottish League One: 2020–21

Individual

- SPFL Scottish League Two Player of the Month: November 2022, January 2023
- PFA Scotland Team of the Year: 2022–23
- PFA Scotland League Two Player of the Year: 2022–23
- PFA Scotland Young Player of the Year nomination: 2022–23
