= David Gold (footballer) =

Scottish football player and coach

Personal information
- Date of birth: 1 January 1993 (age 33)
- Position: Midfielder

Team information
- Current team: Arbroath (player/co-manager)
- Number: 7

Youth career
- –2013: Hibernian

Senior career*
| Years | Team | Apps | (Gls) |
| 2013–2014 | Hibernian | 0 | (0) |
| 2013–2014 | → Queen's Park (loan) | 11 | (0) |
| 2014 | → Cowdenbeath (loan) | 5 | (0) |
| 2014–2015 | Berwick Rangers | 30 | (4) |
| 2015– | Arbroath | 271 | (12) |

Managerial career
- 2024: Arbroath (interim)
- 2024–: Arbroath (co-manager)
- * Club domestic league appearances and goals as of 4 May 2026

David Gold (born 1 January 1993) is a Scottish professional footballer who plays as a midfielder for Scottish Championship club Arbroath, where he is also co-manager.

He has previously played for Hibernian, Queen's Park, Cowdenbeath and Berwick Rangers.

He took interim charge of Arbroath alongside Colin Hamilton in August 2024, become becoming permanent player-manager in September 2024.

== Career statistics ==
As of match played 26 April 2025

Appearances and goals by club, season and competition
| Club | Season | League | | | Scottish Cup | | Scottish League Cup | | Other | | Total | |
| Club | Season | Division | Apps | Goals | Apps | Goals | Apps | Goals | Apps | Goals | Apps | Goals |
|---|---|---|---|---|---|---|---|---|---|---|---|---|
| Hibernian | 2013–14 | Scottish Premiership | 0 | 0 | 0 | 0 | 0 | 0 | 0 | 0 | 0 | 0 |
| Queen's Park (loan) | 2013–14 | Scottish League Two | 11 | 0 | 3 | 0 | 0 | 0 | 0 | 0 | 14 | 0 |
| Cowdenbeath (loan) | 2013–14 | Scottish Championship | 5 | 0 | 0 | 0 | 0 | 0 | 1 (Note: Appearance(s) in Scottish Championship play-offs) | 0 | 6 | 0 |
| Berwick Rangers | 2014–15 | Scottish League Two | 30 | 4 | 6 | 1 | 1 | 0 | 2 (Note: Appearance(s) in Scottish Challenge Cup) | 0 | 39 | 5 |
| Arbroath | 2015–16 | Scottish League Two | 24 | 0 | 3 | 0 | 1 | 1 | 1 | 0 | 29 | 1 |
| Arbroath | 2016–17 | Scottish League Two | 32 | 1 | 2 | 0 | 3 | 0 | 1 | 0 | 38 | 1 |
| Arbroath | 2017–18 | Scottish League One | 32 | 1 | 2 | 0 | 4 | 1 | 1 | 0 | 39 | 2 |
| Arbroath | 2018–19 | Scottish League One | 30 | 1 | 1 | 0 | 4 | 0 | 3 | 0 | 38 | 1 |
| Arbroath | 2019–20 | Scottish Championship | 21 | 1 | 3 | 0 | 4 | 2 | 2 | 0 | 30 | 3 |
| Arbroath | 2020–21 | Scottish Championship | 23 | 1 | 1 | 0 | 4 | 2 | — | | 28 | 3 |
| Arbroath | 2021–22 | Scottish Championship | 25 | 2 | 0 | 0 | 5 | 0 | 2 (Note: One appearance in Scottish Challenge Cup, One appearance in Scottish Premiership play-offs) | 0 | 32 | 2 |
| Arbroath | 2022–23 | Scottish Championship | 28 | 2 | 2 | 0 | 4 | 0 | 2 | 0 | 36 | 2 |
| Arbroath | 2023–24 | Scottish Championship | 33 | 3 | 1 | 1 | 4 | 0 | 3 | 1 | 41 | 5 |
| Arbroath | 2024–25 | Scottish League One | 18 | 0 | 1 | 0 | 3 | 0 | 1 | 0 | 23 | 0 |
| Arbroath | Total | | 266 | 12 | 16 | 1 | 36 | 6 | 16 | 1 | 334 | 20 |
| Career total | | | 312 | 16 | 25 | 2 | 37 | 6 | 19 | 1 | 393 | 25 |

=== Managerial statistics ===
As of match played 7 November 2026

| Team | From | To | Record | | | | | Ref |
| Team | From | To | G | W | D | L | Win % | Ref |
|---|---|---|---|---|---|---|---|---|
| Arbroath (co-manager) | 12 September 2024 | Present | 96 | 42 | 22 | 32 | 43.75 | |
| Total | | | 96 | 42 | 22 | 32 | 43.75 | — |
