= Zak Delaney =

Irish footballer (born 2002)

Personal information
- Date of birth: 10 January 2002 (age 24)
- Place of birth: Dublin, Ireland
- Position: Defender

Team information
- Current team: Greenock Morton
- Number: 3

Youth career
- 2009–2014: Leicester Celtic
- 2015–2016: St Francis
- 2016–2018: St Patrick's Athletic
- 2018–2020: West Bromwich Albion

Senior career*
Years	Team	Apps	(Gls)
2021–2022	West Bromwich Albion	0	(0)
2021–2022	→ Bath City (loan)	4	(0)
2022–2024	Inverness Caledonian Thistle	37	(0)
2024	Arbroath	9	(0)
2024–	Greenock Morton	68	(1)

International career^{‡}
2018	Republic of Ireland U-17	1	(0)
	Republic of Ireland U-20	0	(0)
- * Club domestic league appearances and goals as of 4 May 2026 ‡ National team caps and goals as of 22:55, 5 July 2022 (UTC)

Zak Delaney (born 10 January 2002) is an Irish professional footballer, who plays for Scottish Championship club Greenock Morton.

== Club career ==
Delaney spent his early youth career playing for Dublin sides, St Francis and St Patrick's Athletic before securing himself a move to EFL Championship side West Bromwich Albion.

Delaney never made an appearance for the first team at West Brom, as he spent his season out on loan to Bath City in the National League South, making his debut against Welling United.

In July 2022, Delaney went on trial at Inverness Caledonian Thistle, featuring in their 10–0 and 1–0 friendly wins over Clachnacuddin and Brora Rangers respectively, before signing for the club on 4 July.

On 12 January 2024, Delaney was released by Inverness and joined Championship rivals, Arbroath, making his debut the following day.

On 3 July 2024, Delaney joined Scottish Championship side Greenock Morton.

== Career statistics ==
=== Club ===
As of match played 26 April 2025

Appearances and goals by club, season and competition
Club	Season	League			National cup (Note: Includes FA Cup, Scottish Cup)		League cup (Note: Includes EFL Cup, Scottish League Cup)		Other		Total	
Club	Season	Division	Apps	Goals	Apps	Goals	Apps	Goals	Apps	Goals	Apps	Goals
West Brom U21	2018-19	—			—		—		1 (Note: Appearance(s) in EFL Trophy)	0	1	0
West Brom U21	2020-21	—			—		—		2	0	2	0
West Brom U21	Total		—		—		—		3	0	3	0
West Brom	2021-22	Championship	0	0	0	0	0	0	—		0	0
Bath City	2021-22	National League South	29	0	0	0	—		1 (Note: Appearance(s) in FA Trophy)	0	30	0
Inverness Caledonian Thistle	2022-23	Scottish Championship	30	0	4	0	5	0	1 (Note: Appearance(s) in Scottish Challenge Cup)	0	40	0
Inverness Caledonian Thistle	2023-24	Scottish Championship	7	0	1	0	3	0	1	0	12	0
Inverness Caledonian Thistle	Total		37	0	5	0	8	0	2	0	52	0
Arbroath	2023-24	Scottish Championship	9	0	0	0	0	0	0	0	9	0
Greenock Morton	2024-25	Scottish Championship	34	1	1	0	4	0	1	0	40	1
Career total			109	1	6	0	12	0	7	0	131	1
