= Adam Mackinnon =

Scottish footballer (born 2003)

Personal information
- Date of birth: 30 April 2003 (age 23)
- Place of birth: Stornoway, Scotland
- Height: 1.75 m (5 ft 9 in)
- Position: Central midfielder

Team information
- Current team: Inverness Caledonian Thistle
- Number: 8

Youth career
- –2017: Back
- 2017–2020: Ross County

Senior career*
Years	Team	Apps	(Gls)
2020–2024	Ross County	3	(0)
2020–2021	→ Brora Rangers (loan)		
2021–2022	→ Brora Rangers (loan)		
2022	→ Montrose (loan)	18	(2)
2023	→ Montrose (loan)	10	(0)
2023	→ Brora Rangers (loan)		
2024	→ Arbroath (loan)	17	(1)
2024–	Inverness Caledonian Thistle	60	(3)
- * Club domestic league appearances and goals as of 09:53, 3 May 2026 (UTC)

Adam Mackinnon (born 30 April 2003) is a Scottish professional footballer who plays as a central midfielder for Scottish League One side Inverness Caledonian Thistle.

== Career ==
=== Ross County ===
Mackinnon made his he made his debut for County on 14 November 2020 in the Scottish League Cup against Stirling Albion. After returning from a loan spell with Brora, Mackinnon made his league debut for County on 26 February 2022 in a 3–1 win against St Johnstone coming on for Harry Paton in the 90th minute.

==== Loans ====
On 20 November 2020 Mackinnon joined Highland Football League side Brora Rangers ahead of the new season. Mackinnon rejoined Brora on 30 August 2021 on a six-month loan from County.

Mackinnon was loaned to Scottish League One club Montrose in the summer of 2022. He was recalled from loan on 27 December 2022 to be assessed by County manager Malky Mackay. On 27 January 2023, Mackinnon would return on loan for the Gable Endies until the end of the season.

On 7 October 2023 Mackinnon was loaned to Highland League side Brora Rangers till the end of the 23/24 season.

In January 2024, Mackinnon joined Scottish Championship club Arbroath on loan until the end of the season.

=== Inverness Caledonian Thistle ===
In August 2024, Mackinnon joined Scottish League One club Inverness Caledonian Thistle on a 2 Year Contract.

== Career statistics ==
As of match played 22 July 2023

Appearances and goals by club, season and competition
Club	Season	League			Cup		League Cup		Other		Total	
Club	Season	Division	Apps	Goals	Apps	Goals	Apps	Goals	Apps	Goals	Apps	Goals
Ross County	2020–21	Scottish Premiership	0	0	0	0	1	0	—		1	0
Ross County	2021–22	Scottish Premiership	3	0	0	0	0	0	—		3	0
Ross County	2022–23	Scottish Premiership	0	0	0	0	0	0	—		0	0
Ross County	2023–24	Scottish Premiership	0	0	0	0	1	0	—		0	0
Ross County	Total		3	0	0	0	2	0	0	0	5	0
Montrose (loan)	2022–23	Scottish League One	18	2	0	0	0	0	2 (Note: Appearances in the Scottish Challenge Cup)	0	20	2
Montrose (loan)	2022–23	Scottish League One	10	0	0	0	0	0	0	0	10	0
Career total			31	2	0	0	2	0	2	0	35	2

== Honours ==
Inverness Caledonian Thistle

- Scottish League One: 2025–26
