= Scott Bitsindou =

Congolese footballer

Personal information
- Full name: Romeni Scott Bitsindou
- Date of birth: 11 May 1996 (age 30)
- Place of birth: Brussels, Belgium
- Height: 1.94 m (6 ft 4 in)
- Position: Defensive midfielder

Team information
- Current team: Heist
- Number: 5

Youth career
- 2011–2016: Anderlecht

Senior career*
Years	Team	Apps	(Gls)
2016–2017	United Zürich		
2018–2020	Javor Ivanjica	0	(0)
2018–2020	→ Lommel (loan)	44	(1)
2020–2022	Lierse	48	(1)
2022–2024	Livingston	1	(0)
2022–2023	→ Arbroath (loan)	16	(0)
2024–	Heist	12	(1)

International career^{‡}
2015	Congo U20	2	(0)
2021–	Congo	1	(0)
- * Club domestic league appearances and goals as of 7 May 2025 ‡ National team caps and goals as of 5 May 2023

Romeni Scott Bitsindou (born 11 May 1996) is a Congolese professional footballer who plays as a defensive midfielder for Heist. Born in Belgium, he plays for the Republic of the Congo national team.

== Club career ==
Born in Brussels, Belgium, Bitsindou joined the youth system of Anderlecht in 2011. He played for Anderlecht in the 2014–15 UEFA Youth League. He left Anderlecht in summer 2016 and had trials at Marseille, however Bitsindou was not offered a contract. He reappeared at the end of the year in Switzerland where he played with FC United Zürich in Swiss Promotion League, third level, in seasons 2016–17 and first half of 2017–18. During the winter-break, after trials, he got contract with Serbian SuperLiga side Javor Ivanjica. Bitsindou failed to make an appearance in Serbia, and Javor were relegated to the Serbian First League.

Due to the limit on the number of foreign players in the Serbian First League, Bitsindou accepted a loan back to Belgium to Belgian First Division B side Lommel SK. He made his debut for Lommel on 3 August 2018 in a home game against Union Saint-Gilloise. In the summer of 2020, Bitsindou joined Lierse on a permanent deal.

Bitsindou joined Scottish club Livingston during the summer of 2022. Livingston loaned Bitsindou to Arbroath in September 2022. In the summer of 2023 manager David Martindale announced that Bitsindou was no longer part of his plans and he was to find a new club. This was reiterated even after the transfer window had closed, with Martindale adding that the player had been speaking to clubs in Belgium. On 19 January 2024, Livingston announced the club had mutually parted ways with Bitsindou.

== International career ==
While at youth levels of Anderlecht he represented Belgium at U-15 level, however, due to its origins, in 2015 he accepted a call from Congo national U-20 side to play in the 2015 African U-20 Championship, making two appearances. He represented the senior Republic of the Congo national team in a friendly 1–0 win over Niger on 10 June 2021.
