= João Baldé =

Portuguese footballer (born 2001)

Personal information
- Date of birth: 21 May 2001 (age 25)
- Place of birth: Lisbon, Portugal
- Position: Midfielder

Team information
- Current team: East Kilbride
- Number: 8

Youth career
- –2012: Atlético Clube do Cacém
- 2012–2013: RD Algueirão
- 2015–2016: The Spartans
- 2016–2019: Rangers

Senior career*
| Years | Team | Apps | (Gls) |
| 2019–2020 | Rangers | 0 | (0) |
| 2019–2020 | → Berwick Rangers (loan) | | |
| 2020–2021 | Livingston | 0 | (0) |
| 2020–2021 | → Bonnyrigg Rose (loan) | | |
| 2021–2022 | Civil Service Strollers | | |
| 2022–2023 | Hibernian | 0 | (0) |
| 2022 | → Civil Service Strollers (loan) | | |
| 2022 | → East Fife (loan) | 15 | (2) |
| 2023–2024 | Arbroath | 28 | (1) |
| 2023 | → East Kilbride (loan) | 8 | (2) |
| 2024– | East Kilbride | 76 | (18) |
- * Club domestic league appearances and goals as of 4 May 2026

João Baldé (born 21 May 2001) is a Portuguese professional footballer who plays as a midfielder for East Kilbride.

== Club career ==
Baldé started his career in youth academies of Atlético Clube do Cacém and RD Algueirão in his native Portugal. In 2015, he moved to Scotland and joined the Spartans youth academy. He earned a move to Rangers youth academy in 2016. The midfielder had his first taste of senior football when he joined Berwick Rangers on loan in 2019

A short spell with Livingston followed, where he spent the duration of his stay on loan at Bonnyrigg Rose After a brief spell with Civil Service Strollers, Baldé signed for Hibernian. He was immediately loaned back to Civil Service Strollers for the remainder of the 2021–2022 season.

In August 2022, he signed for East Fife on a season long loan deal. He made his league debut on 6 August 2022 in a 3–0 home defeat to former club Bonnyrigg Rose.

Baldé signed for Arbroath on a permanent deal on 2 January 2023, making his debut that day in a 4–2 win at home to Dundee.

The midfielder signed for East Kilbride on loan in November 2023. He signed permanently for the club in February 2024.

== International career ==
Baldé was called up to the Portugal national under-18 football team in March 2019, but did not make an appearance.

== Personal life ==
He was banned from driving for a year and fined £450 after being found drunk in his parked car in November 2023.
