= Víctor López (footballer, born 2003) =

Mexican footballer

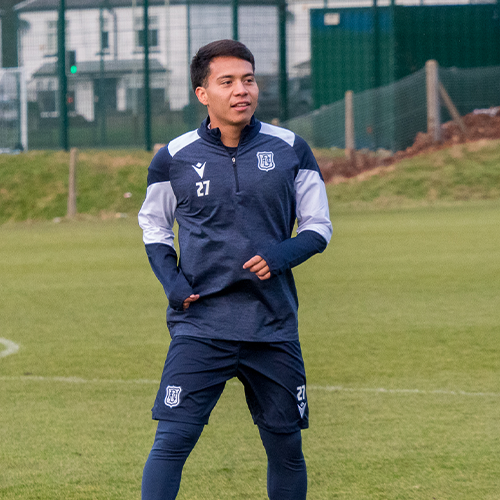
- López in 2025

Personal information
- Full name: Víctor Daniel López Sámano
- Date of birth: 8 May 2003 (age 23)
- Place of birth: Puente de Ixtla, Mexico
- Height: 1.67 m (5 ft 6 in)
- Positions: Midfielder; winger

Team information
- Current team: Atlético Morelia
- Number: 11

Youth career
- 2018–2024: Monterrey

Senior career*
Years	Team	Apps	(Gls)
2021–2026	Monterrey	15	(3)
2021–2023	→ Raya2 (loan)	42	(5)
2024–2025	→ Querétaro (loan)	2	(1)
2025	→ Dundee (loan)	0	(0)
2025–2026	→ Querétaro (loan)	2	(1)
2026–	Atlético Morelia	8	(1)

International career^{‡}
2024–	Mexico U23	1	(0)
- * Club domestic league appearances and goals as of 21 September 2026 ‡ National team caps and goals as of 26 March 2024

Víctor Daniel López Sámano (born 8 May 2003), also known by the nickname Chespi, is a Mexican professional footballer who plays as a midfielder or winger for Liga de Expansión MX club Atlético Morelia, and for the Mexico national under-23 team.

== Club career ==
=== Monterrey ===
López joined the youth ranks at Monterrey in 2018, playing for Rayados at the under-17, under-20 and under-23 level. In 2021, López joined the Rayados development team in Liga de Expansión MX, Raya2 Expansión, on a two-year loan deal. López broke into the Rayados first team in the 2023–24 season amid an injury crisis, and made his debut for the senior Rayados team on 2 July 2023 in a Liga MX draw away to Atlético San Luis. On 26 October, López scored his first Monterrey goal in a league win at home to Club Tijuana. After becoming a regular player for Monterrey, López received plaudits and was considered a top prospect for the future.

=== Querétaro ===
On 3 July 2024, López joined fellow Liga MX club and Monterrey's strategic partner Querétaro on a permanent deal. 'Chespi' made his debut for Los Gallos 3 days later in a home league defeat to Club Tijuana. On 21 July, 'Chespi' scored his first Querétaro goal away to his former club Monterrey, and apologised to the Rayados fans who had applauded him onto the field.

==== Loan to Dundee ====
On 22 January 2025, López joined Scottish Premiership club Dundee on a year-long loan deal with assistance from Monterrey, joining fellow Mexicans and former Monterrey teammates Antonio Portales and César Garza at the 'old continent' club. On 8 February 2025, López made his debut for Dundee as a substitute in a Scottish Cup fifth round victory over Airdrieonians. On 22 August 2025, Dundee confirmed that López had left the club and rejoined Querétaro.

=== Atlético Morelia ===
In July 2026, López joined Liga de Expansión MX club Atlético Morelia.

== International career ==
On 26 March 2024, López made his debut for the Mexico national under-23 football team in a 3–0 win over Argentina U23 in a friendly.

== Career statistics ==
=== Club ===
As of 19 July 2025

Appearances and goals by club, season and competition
Club	Season	League			National cup (Note: Includes Scottish Cup)		League cup		Other		Total	
Club	Season	Division	Apps	Goals	Apps	Goals	Apps	Goals	Apps	Goals	Apps	Goals
Monterrey	2021–22	Liga MX	0	0	–		–		–		0	0
Monterrey	2022–23	Liga MX	0	0	–		–		–		0	0
Monterrey	2023–24	Liga MX	15	3	–		–		6 (Note: Three appearances in Leagues Cup, three appearances in CONCACAF Champions Cup)	0	21	3
Monterrey	2024–25	Liga MX	0	0	–		–		–		0	0
Monterrey	Total		15	3	0	0	0	0	6	0	21	3
Raya2 (loan)	2021–22	Liga de Expansión MX	7	0	–		–		–		7	0
Raya2 (loan)	2022–23	Liga de Expansión MX	35	5	–		–		–		35	5
Raya2 (loan)	Total		42	5	0	0	0	0	0	0	42	5
Querétaro	2024–25	Liga MX	2	1	–		–		1 (Note: Appearance(s) in Leagues Cup)	0	3	1
Querétaro	2025–26	Liga MX	0	0	–		–		0	0	0	0
Querétaro	Total		2	1	0	0	0	0	1	0	3	1
Dundee (loan)	2024–25	Scottish Premiership	0	0	1	0	–		–		1	0
Dundee (loan)	2025–26	Scottish Premiership	0	0	0	0	1	0	–		1	0
Dundee (loan)	Total		0	0	1	0	1	0	0	0	2	0
Career total			59	9	1	0	1	0	7	0	68	9
