= 2024–25 Arbroath F.C. season =

Arbroath
2024–25 season
- Chairman: Ewen West
- Manager: Jim McIntyre (until 17 August); Colin Hamilton & David Gold (Player / Co-Managers) (from 12 September)
- Stadium: Gayfield Park
- Scottish League One: Winners
- Scottish League Cup: Group stage
- Scottish Challenge Cup: Fourth round
- Scottish Cup: Third round
- Top goalscorer: League: Ryan Dow (8); All: Ryan Dow; Gavin Reilly (8)
- Highest home attendance: 2,714 vs. Montrose, League One, 28 December 2024
- Lowest home attendance: 559 vs. Annan Athletic, League Cup, 20 July 2024
- Average home league attendance: 1,434

The 2024–25 season was Arbroath's first season in League One, following their relegation from the Scottish Championship in the 2023–24 season. Arbroath also competed in the Scottish League Cup, Scottish Challenge Cup and the Scottish Cup.

== Competitions ==
=== Pre-season and friendlies ===
Date	Opponent	Venue	Result (Note: Arbroath's score written first)	Scorers	Attendance	Ref.
29 June 2024	Dundee	Home	1–3	Murray 63'	1,836	
6 July 2024	St Johnstone	Home	0–1		1,043	

=== Scottish League One ===
Win	Draw	Loss

Date	Opponent	Venue	Result	Scorers	Attendance	Ref.
3 August 2024	Stenhousemuir	Away	1–2	Coulson 90'	738	
10 August 2024	Montrose	Home	0–0		2,040	
17 August 2024	Kelty Hearts	Home	0–3		1,023	
24 August 2024	Dumbarton	Away	2–2	Stewart 5', Dow 50'	688	
31 August 2024	Alloa Athletic	Home	0–0		1,143	
14 September 2024	Queen of the South	Away	1–2	Dow 10'	996	
21 September 2024	Annan Athletic	Home	2–0	Dow 73', Reilly 79'	1,193	
28 September 2024	Cove Rangers	Away	4–2	Stewart 31', Murray 38', Spalding 47', Wilkie 73'	645	
5 October 2024	Inverness Caledonian Thistle	Home	1–0	Reilly 67'	1,381	
19 October 2024	Dumbarton	Home	1–3	O'Brien 11'	1,159	
26 October 2024	Alloa Athletic	Away	0–1	Gallagher 43'	701	
2 November 2024	Stenhousemuir	Home	1–0	Taylor 12'	1,141	
9 November 2024	Montrose	Away	1–1	Dow 80'	1,565	
16 November 2024	Cove Rangers	Home	2–1	Stewart 18', Murray 32'	1,278	
7 December 2024	Queen of the South	Home	2–1	Murray 76', Gallagher 90+1'	709	
14 December 2024	Inverness Caledonian Thistle	Away	2–0	Smith 52', Reilly 90+3'	1,531	
17 December 2024	Kelty Hearts	Away	2–3	Reilly 42', Murray 57'	523	
21 December 2024	Annan Athletic	Away	4–0	Taylor 12', Reilly 22', 49' pen., Murray 43'	478	
28 December 2024	Montrose	Home	3–0	Spalding 21', O'Brien 65', Taylor 84'	2,714	
4 January 2025	Alloa Athletic	Home	1–3	Reilly 13'	1,340	
1 February 2025	Cove Rangers	Away	1–2	Winter 7'	758	
8 February 2025	Inverness Caledonian Thistle	Home	3–0	Steele 26', Winter 42' pen., Dow 70'	1,500	
15 February 2025	Queen of the South	Away	3–0	Stewart 13', Taylor 22', Douglas 26' o.g.	1,203	
22 February 2025	Stenhousemuir	Away	0–2		705	
25 February 2025	Kelty Hearts	Home	2–1	Stewart 3', Winter 80'	628	
1 March 2025	Annan Athletic	Home	3–0	Taylor 40', Winter 74', Gallagher 87'	1,180	
4 March 2025	Dumbarton	Away	2–1	Winter 15', Dow 47'	355	
8 March 2025	Alloa Athletic	Away	3–2	Dow 20', Muirhead 47', Gallagher 89'	805	
15 March 2025	Dumbarton	Home	1–1	Stanton 11'	1,434	
22 March 2025	Kelty Hearts	Away	1–1	Watson 17'	754	
29 March 2025	Cove Rangers	Home	1–0	Muirhead 8'	1,422	
5 April 2025	Montrose	Away	1–0	Flynn 45'	1,792	
12 April 2025	Stenhousemuir	Home	4–0	Stanton 45+1', 52', Taylor 48', Winter 60'	2,205	
19 April 2025	Annan Athletic	Away	1–5	King 17'	604	
26 April 2025	Inverness Caledonian Thistle	Away	0–3		2,329	
3 May 2025	Queen of the South	Home	1–1	Dow 75'	2,314	

=== Scottish League Cup ===
==== Group stage ====
Win	Draw	Loss

Date	Opponent	Venue	Result	Scorers	Attendance	Ref.
16 July 2024	Dundee	Home	0–2		1,776	
20 July 2024	Annan Athletic	Home	0–3		559	
23 July 2024	Inverness Caledonian Thistle	Away	0–0 (5–3 pen.)	1,531	754	
27 July 2024	Bonnyrigg Rose	Away	1–0	Reilly 87'	622	

=== Scottish Challenge Cup ===
Win	Draw	Loss

Round	Date	Opponent	Venue	Result	Scorers	Attendance	Ref.
Third round	7 September 2024	Montrose	Home	3–0	O'Brien 23' pen., Stewart 29', Gallagher 82'	1,051	
Fourth round	11 October 2024	Alloa Athletic	Away	0–1		480	

=== Scottish Cup ===
Win	Draw	Loss

Round	Date	Opponent	Venue	Result	Scorers	Attendance	Ref.
Third round	30 November 2024	Queen of the South	Home	0–1		818	

== Player statistics ==
=== Appearances and goals ===
As of 3 May 2025

No.	Pos	Player	League One		League Cup		Challenge Cup		Scottish Cup		Total	
No.	Pos	Player	Apps	Goals	Apps	Goals	Apps	Goals	Apps	Goals	Apps	Goals
2	DF	(Scotland) Aaron Steele	8+5	1	2+1	0	0	0	0	0	16	1
3	DF	(Scotland) Colin Hamilton	0	0	2	0	0	0	0	0	2	0
4	DF	(Scotland) Jack Wilkie	36	1	4	0	2	0	1	0	43	1
5	DF	(Scotland) Thomas O'Brien	26+4	2	4	0	1+1	1	0	0	36	3
6	MF	(Scotland) Sam Stanton	15+1	3	0	0	0	0	0	0	16	3
7	MF	(Scotland) David Gold	10+8	0	3	0	1	0	0+1	0	23	0
9	FW	(Scotland) Calum Gallagher	8+18	4	0+2	0	0+1	1	1	0	30	5
10	FW	(Scotland) Gavin Reilly	14+6	7	0+1	1	2	0	0+1	0	24	8
11	MF	(Scotland) Ryan Dow	26+4	8	3	0	1+1	0	1	0	36	8
12	MF	(Scotland) Scott Stewart	31+1	5	2	0	1+1	1	1	0	37	6
14	MF	(Scotland) Fraser Taylor	25+1	5	0	0	0	0	0	0	26	5
15	DF	(Scotland) Keith Watson	24+3	1	0+1	0	2	0	1	0	31	1
17	MF	(Scotland) Billy King	2+5	1	0	0	0	0	0	0	7	1
18	DF	(Scotland) Layton Bisland	6+3	0	4	0	1+1	0	1	0	16	0
19	DF	(Scotland) Callum Penman	13	0	0	0	0	0	0	0	13	0
20	MF	(Scotland) Ryan Flynn	24+3	1	0	0	1+1	0	1	0	30	1
21	GK	(Scotland) Aidan McAdams	35	0	3	0	2	0	1	0	41	0
22	MF	(Scotland) Innes Murray	13+15	5	4	0	1	0	0+1	0	34	5
24	MF	(Scotland) Kieran McKechnie	1+6	0	0	0	0	0	0	0	7	0
25	FW	(Scotland) Andy Winter	15+1	6	0	0	0	0	0	0	16	6
26	DF	(Scotland) Jason Thomson	0+2	0	0	0	0	0	0	0	2	0
27	DF	(Scotland) Aaron Muirhead	11+1	2	0	0	0	0	0	0	12	2
31	GK	(Scotland) Jack McConnell	1	0	0	0	0	0	0	0	1	0
32	MF	(Scotland) Ali Spalding	19+9	2	3+1	0	1	0	1	0	34	2
Players who left the club during the 2024–25 season
1	GK	(Scotland) Robbie Hemfrey	0	0	1	0	0	0	0	0	1	0
6	MF	(Scotland) Craig Slater	2+12	0	4	0	1+1	0	1	0	21	0
8	MF	(Scotland) Liam Callaghan	4+6	0	2+1	0	1+1	0	0	0	15	0
14	FW	(Scotland) Mark Stowe	0+3	0	1+2	0	0	0	0	0	6	0
16	MF	(Scotland) Quinn Coulson	6+7	1	1	0	2	0	0+1	0	17	1
17	FW	(Scotland) Jamie Richardson	0+3	0	0	0	0	0	0	0	3	0
19	DF	(New Zealand) Brynn Sinclair	4+1	0	0	0	2	0	0	0	7	0
20	DF	(Republic of Ireland) Gordon Walker	0	0	1+1	0	0	0	0	0	2	0
23	DF	(Scotland) Dylan Smith	11	1	0	0	0	0	1	0	12	1

== Team statistics ==
=== League table ===
Pos	Team	Pld	W	D	L	GF	GA	GD	Pts	Promotion, qualification or relegation
1	Arbroath (C, P)	36	19	7	10	58	42	+16	64	Promotion to the Championship
2	Cove Rangers	36	16	9	11	62	44	+18	57	Qualification for the Championship play-offs
3	Queen of the South	36	16	7	13	46	41	+5	55	Qualification for the Championship play-offs
4	Stenhousemuir	36	15	8	13	48	45	+3	53	Qualification for the Championship play-offs
5	Alloa Athletic	36	13	12	11	55	47	+8	51	

Rules for classification: 1) Points; 2) Goal difference; 3) Goals scored; 4) Head-to-to head points; 5) Head-to-head goal difference; 6) Play-off (only for deciding promotion, play-off participation and relegation).
(C) Champions; (P) Promoted

=== League Cup table ===
Pos	Team	Pld	W	PW	PL	L	GF	GA	GD	Pts	Qualification	DND	ANN	ARB	ICT	BON
1	Dundee	4	4	0	0	0	18	2	+16	12	Qualification for the second round	—	3–1	—	6–0	—
2	Annan Athletic	4	2	0	1	1	7	5	+2	7		—	—	—	1–0	2–2p
3	Arbroath	4	1	1	0	2	1	5	−4	5		0–2	0–3	—	—	—
4	Inverness Caledonian Thistle	4	1	0	1	2	3	7	−4	4		—	—	0–0p	—	3–0
5	Bonnyrigg Rose	4	0	1	0	3	3	13	−10	2		1–7	—	0–1	—	—

Rules for classification: 1) goal difference, 2) goals scored, 3) away goals scored, 4) matches won, 5) away matches won, 6) drawing of lots.

== Transfers ==
=== Transfers in ===
Date	Position	Name	From	Fee	Ref.
17 April 2024	FW	Calum Gallagher	Airdrieonians	Free transfer	
6 May 2024	FW	Gavin Reilly	Queen of the South	Free transfer	
28 May 2024	DF	Jack Wilkie	Dundee	Free transfer	
5 June 2024	MF	Liam Callaghan	Montrose	Free transfer	
22 June 2024	DF	Layton Bisland	Dundee United	Free transfer	
22 June 2024	GK	Robbie Hemfrey	Airdrieonians	Free transfer	
13 July 2024	GK	Aidan McAdams	(Northern Ireland) Larne	Free transfer	
13 July 2024	MF	Ali Spalding	Airdrieonians	Free transfer	
25 July 2024	DF	Keith Watson	Raith Rovers	Free transfer	
26 July 2024	MF	Quinn Coulson	Alloa Athletic	Free transfer	
30 August 2024	DF	(New Zealand) Brynn Sinclair	(New Zealand) Petone	Free transfer	
30 August 2024	MF	Ryan Flynn	St Mirren	Free transfer	
21 September 2024	GK	Jack McConnell	Heart of Midlothian	Free transfer	
24 January 2025	MF	Billy King	(United States) Northern Colorado Hailstorm	Free transfer	
24 January 2025	MF	Kieran McKechnie	Queen of the South	Free transfer	
14 February 2025	DF	Jason Thomson	Kelty Hearts	Free transfer	

=== Transfers out ===
Date	Position	Name	To	Fee	Ref.
7 May 2024	GK	Ali Adams	East Fife	Free transfer	
7 May 2024	GK	Derek Gaston	Stirling Albion	Free transfer	
7 May 2024	DF	(Republic of Ireland) Zak Delaney	Greenock Morton	Free transfer	
7 May 2024	DF	Ricky Little	Beith Juniors	Free transfer	
7 May 2024	MF	Scott Allan	Kelty Hearts	Free transfer	
7 May 2024	MF	Darren Lyon	Clyde	Free transfer	
7 May 2024	MF	Michael McKenna	Falkirk	Free transfer	
7 May 2024	MF	(South Africa) Keaghan Jacobs	Gala Fairydean Rovers	Free transfer	
7 May 2024	MF	(England) Jess Norey	East Fife	Free transfer	
7 May 2024	FW	(England) Jay Bird	(England) Exeter City	Free transfer	
7 May 2024	FW	(Germany) Kenan Dünnwald-Turan	(Bulgaria) Hebar Pazardzhik	Free transfer	
7 May 2024	FW	(Republic of Ireland) Kyle Robinson	(Republic of Ireland) Athlone Town	Free transfer	
28 May 2024	FW	Leighton McIntosh	Queen of the South	Free transfer	
13 August 2024	DF	(Republic of Ireland) Gordon Walker	East Fife	Free transfer	
23 August 2024	FW	Mark Stowe	The Spartans	Undisclosed	
6 January 2025	MF	Craig Slater	Forfar Athletic	Free transfer	
31 January 2025	MF	(New Zealand) Brynn Sinclair		Free transfer	

=== Loans in ===
Date	Position	Name	From	End date	Ref.
9 August 2024	FW	Jamie Richardson	Dundee	1 January 2025	
27 September 2024	MF	Fraser Taylor	St Mirren	31 May 2025	
30 September 2024	DF	Dylan Smith	Ross County	31 May 2025	
23 January 2025	MF	Sam Stanton	Raith Rovers	31 May 2025	
24 January 2025	FW	Andy Winter	Livingston	31 May 2025	
5 February 2025	DF	Callum Penman	St Mirren	31 May 2025	
25 February 2025	DF	Aaron Muirhead	Partick Thistle	31 May 2025	

=== Loans out ===
Date	Position	Name	To	End date	Ref.
30 August 2024	DF	Aaron Steele	Stenhousemuir	31 May 2025	
21 September 2024	GK	Robbie Hemfrey	Clyde	31 May 2025	
24 January 2025	MF	Quinn Coulson	Cove Rangers	31 May 2025	
28 January 2025	MF	Liam Callaghan	Brechin City	31 May 2025	
