= Oluwaseun Adewumi =

Austrian footballer (born 2005)

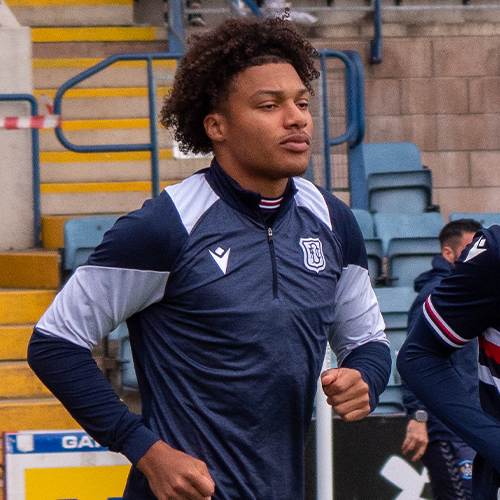
- Adewumi in 2024

Personal information
- Full name: Oluwaseun Victor Adewumi
- Date of birth: 23 February 2005 (age 21)
- Place of birth: Vienna, Austria
- Height: 1.78 m (5 ft 10 in)
- Position: Attacking midfielder

Team information
- Current team: Hertha BSC (on loan from Burnley)
- Number: 19

Youth career
- 2012–2016: Floridsdorfer AC
- 2016–2020: Rapid Wien
- 2020–2022: Floridsdorfer AC

Senior career*
Years	Team	Apps	(Gls)
2022–2024	Floridsdorfer AC	51	(4)
2024–	Burnley	0	(0)
2024–2025	→ Dundee (loan)	28	(4)
2025–2026	→ Cercle Brugge (loan)	32	(5)
2026–	→ Hertha BSC (loan)	11	(5)

International career^{‡}
2024	Austria U19	1	(0)
2024–	Austria U21	14	(1)
- * Club domestic league appearances and goals as of 17:53, 9 November 2026 (UTC) ‡ National team caps and goals as of 13:20, 12 October 2026 (UTC)

Oluwaseun Victor Adewumi (born 23 February 2005) is an Austrian professional footballer who plays as an attacking midfielder for German 2. Bundesliga club Hertha BSC, on loan from EFL Championship club Burnley. He has previously played for Floridsdorfer AC and on loan for Dundee and Cercle Brugge.

== Club career ==
=== Youth career ===
Adewumi joined the youth academy of Rapid Wien in 2016 from Floridsdorfer AC, and remained there until 2020 when he returned to Floridsdorfer AC.

=== Floridsdorfer AC ===
Adewumi started his senior career with Austrian side Floridsdorfer AC, making more than 50 appearances over four seasons.

=== Burnley ===
On 30 August 2024, Adewumi joined the academy of EFL Championship club Burnley, signing a four-year deal with the Clarets.

==== Dundee (loan) ====
On the same day that he signed for Burnley, Adewumi immediately joined Scottish Premiership club Dundee on loan until January 2025. Adewumi made his Dundee debut on 14 September as a substitute away to Ross County. On 5 October, Adewumi scored his first goal for the Dark Blues in a league game at home against Kilmarnock. In January 2025, after a successful first half of the season, Adewumi's loan at Dundee was extended until the end of the season. In between this extension, Adewumi played a key part in and scored in back-to-back games against both sides of the Old Firm. At the end of the season, Adewumi was awarded the Isobel Sneddon Young Player of the Year award as Dundee's best young player for the 2024–25 season. After helping the Dee avoid relegation, Adewumi returned to Burnley at the end of the season.

==== Cercle Brugge (loan) ====
On 15 August 2025, Adewumi joined Belgian Pro League club Cercle Brugge on a season-long loan. Two days later, Adewumi scored on his Cercle debut in a 4–1 win over Westerlo.

==== Hertha BSC (loan) ====
On 24 July 2026, Adewumi was loaned by Hertha BSC in German 2. Bundesliga. He made his debut on 7 August as a substitute in an away win over VfL Bochum. In his next appearance and first at the Olympiastadion, Adewumi scored his first goal for Hertha in a win over Heidenheim. He followed it up the next week with another goal in an away victory over Eintracht Braunschweig.

== International career ==
Adewumi made his debut for Austria U19 in February 2024 against Italy U19 in a friendly match.

In September 2024, Adewumi made his debut for Austria U21 in a UEFA U21 Euro qualifier against Bosnia and Herzegovina U21, assisting one goal in an away victory.

== Career statistics ==
As of match played 7 November 2026

Appearances and goals by club, season and competition
Club	Season	League			National cup (Note: Includes Austrian Cup, Scottish Cup, Belgian Cup, DFB-Pokal)		League cup (Note: Includes Scottish League Cup)		Other		Total	
Club	Season	Division	Apps	Goals	Apps	Goals	Apps	Goals	Apps	Goals	Apps	Goals
Floridsdorfer AC	2021–22	2. Liga	1	0	0	0	—		—		1	0
Floridsdorfer AC	2022–23	2. Liga	16	0	1	1	—		—		17	1
Floridsdorfer AC	2023–24	2. Liga	30	3	2	1	—		—		32	4
Floridsdorfer AC	2024–25	2. Liga	4	1	1	0	—		—		5	1
Floridsdorfer AC	Total		51	4	4	2	—		—		55	6
Burnley	2024–25	Championship	0	0	0	0	—		—		0	0
Dundee (loan)	2024–25	Scottish Premiership	28	4	3	1	1	0	—		32	5
Cercle Brugge (loan)	2025–26	Belgian Pro League	32	5	1	1	—		—		33	6
Hertha BSC (loan)	2026–27	2. Bundesliga	11	5	2	0	—		—		13	5
Career total			122	18	10	4	1	0	—		133	22

== Honours ==
Individual

- Isobel Sneddon Young Player of the Year: 2024–25
