= Finlay Robertson (footballer) =

Scottish footballer

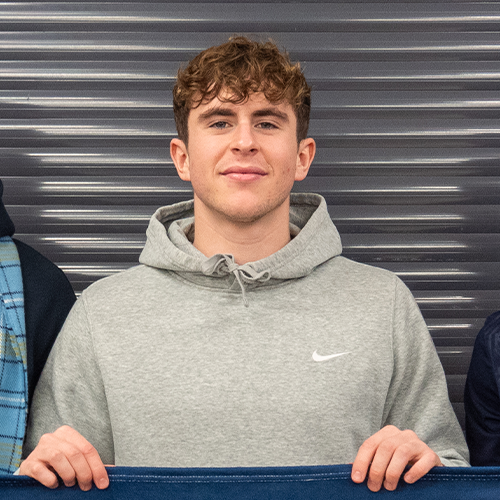
- Robertson with Dundee in 2024

Personal information
- Date of birth: 12 November 2002 (age 23)
- Place of birth: Dundee, Scotland
- Position: Midfielder

Team information
- Current team: Dundee
- Number: 10

Youth career
- Dundee

Senior career*
Years	Team	Apps	(Gls)
2019–	Dundee	106	(3)
2021–2022	→ Cove Rangers (loan)	10	(0)

International career^{‡}
2019	Scotland U19	2	(0)
2023	Scotland U21	1	(0)
- * Club domestic league appearances and goals as of 17:11, 19 September 2026 (UTC) ‡ National team caps and goals as of 21:00, 17 November 2023 (UTC)

Finlay Robertson (born 12 November 2002) is a Scottish professional footballer who plays as a midfielder for Scottish Premiership club Dundee.

== Club career ==
Robertson began his career at his local Sunday League team Fairmuir Boys Club before joining the youth team of his boyhood club Dundee when he was 11. Finlay continued to progress through the age groups earning his first professional contract with the club on his sixteenth birthday. He made his first team debut for Dundee in the final game of the 2018–19 Scottish Premiership season against St Mirren. New manager James McPake introduced Robertson into the first team squad for the 2019–20 season.

Robertson received consistent praise regarding his performances while being such a young age, becoming a first-team regular for the Dee and earning several Man of the Match and SPFL Team of the Week nominations. Despite his first senior season finishing early due to the COVID-19 pandemic, Finlay was named as Dundee's Isobel Sneddon Young Player of the Year. In September 2020, Finlay signed a three-year extension with Dundee, keeping him at the club until 2023. In March 2021, it was announced that Robertson would miss the rest of the season with an ankle injury sustained in training.

On 24 September 2021, Robertson joined Scottish League One side Cove Rangers on loan until January 2022. Robertson returned to Dens in January, having made 10 appearances for Cove Rangers.

On 26 November 2022, Robertson scored his first senior goal for Dundee, in a 6–2 Scottish Cup win over Airdrieonians. It would take just two games later for Finlay to notch his second, in a Challenge Cup win away to Falkirk. Robertson would win the Scottish Championship with Dundee at the end of the season.

On 12 June 2023, Dundee announced that Robertson had signed a new two-year deal, keeping him at the club until the summer of 2025. Over the next couple of seasons with new manager Tony Docherty, Robertson would play a more diverse role for the Dee largely due to his ambidextrous feet, including regularly playing at left wing back and taking corners from both sides with different feet, which saw him get more playing time than with previous managers.

On 4 February 2025, Dundee announced that Robertson had signed a new two-and-a-half year deal which would keep him at the club until the summer of 2027. During the summer and between football seasons in Scotland, Robertson travelled to Mexico to train with Dundee's partner club C.F. Monterrey for a fortnight alongside players such as Sergio Ramos. After his return, Robertson was given the number 10 jersey after the departure of Lyall Cameron to Rangers.

On 5 June 2026, Robertson signed a contract extension with Dundee which would last until 2028. On 6 September 2026, Robertson suffered an ACL injury which ended his 2026–27 season prematurely.

== International career ==
After an impressive start to his rookie season with Dundee, Robertson earned a call-up to the Scotland U19 squad for two matches against Japan in September 2019.

On 12 October 2023, Robertson was called up to the Scotland U21 squad for the 2025 UEFA U21 Euros qualification group games against Hungary and Malta. He made his debut off the bench in November, in an away victory over Belgium in the UEFA Euro U21 qualifiers.

== Career statistics ==
As of 6 September 2026

Appearances and goals by club, season and competition
Club	Season	League			National Cup		League Cup		Other		Total	
Club	Season	Division	Apps	Goals	Apps	Goals	Apps	Goals	Apps	Goals	Apps	Goals
Dundee	2018–19	Scottish Premiership	1	0	0	0	0	0	0	0	1	0
Dundee	2019–20	Scottish Championship	16	0	0	0	5	0	0	0	21	0
Dundee	2020–21	Scottish Championship	6	0	1	0	3	0	0	0	10	0
Dundee	2021–22	Scottish Premiership	2	0	0	0	3	0	0	0	5	0
Dundee	2022–23	Scottish Championship	8	0	2	1	2	0	3 (Note: Appearances in the Scottish Challenge Cup)	2	15	3
Dundee	2023–24	Scottish Premiership	13	0	0	0	3	0	0	0	16	0
Dundee	2024–25	Scottish Premiership	29	0	3	0	5	0	0	0	37	0
Dundee	2025–26	Scottish Premiership	25	3	1	0	4	0	0	0	30	3
Dundee	2026–27	Scottish Premiership	6	0	0	0	3	1	0	0	9	1
Dundee	Total		106	3	7	1	28	1	3	2	144	7
Dundee B	2021–22	—			—		—		1	0	1	0
Dundee B	2023–24	—			—		—		1	0	1	0
Dundee B	Total		—		—		—		2	0	2	0
Cove Rangers (loan)	2021–22	Scottish League One	10	0	0	0	0	0	0	0	10	0
Career total			116	3	7	1	28	1	5	2	156	7

== Honours ==
Dundee

- Scottish Championship: 2022–23

=== Individual ===
Dundee

- Isobel Sneddon Young Player of the Year: 2019–20
