= 2024–25 Dundee F.C. season =

Dundee
2024–25 season
- Chairman: Tim Keyes
- Manager: Tony Docherty
- Stadium: Dens Park
- Scottish Premiership: 10th
- Scottish Cup: Quarter-finals
- League Cup: Quarter-finals
- Top goalscorer: League: Simon Murray (16); All: Simon Murray (22)
- Highest home attendance: 11,585 vs. Dundee United, 2 January 2025 (Prem.)
- Lowest home attendance: 888 vs. Annan Athletic, 23 July 2024 (League Cup GS) (Note: Played at Glebe Park.)
- Average home league attendance: 7,027
Home colours	Away colours	Third colours

The 2024–25 season was the 123rd season in which Dundee competed at a Scottish national level, and the 100th season played in the highest division in the Scottish football league system. They played in the Scottish Premiership for the second consecutive season after finishing in the top six the previous campaign. Dundee also competed in the Scottish Cup and League Cup, reaching the quarter-finals in both competitions.

== Season summary ==
=== Pre-season ===
Dundee announced their first pre-season game of the season on 9 May 2024, heading to Gayfield Park to play Scottish League One side Arbroath on 29 June. The following week, they announced the side would go on a pre-season training camp in Poznań, Poland at the beginning of July, and would take on Czech club Baník Ostrava and Polish side Lech Poznań during their camp there. On 7 June, Dundee announced they would play their final pre-season friendly at East End Park against Dunfermline Athletic.

On 25 June, Dundee announced that manager Tony Docherty had committed to the club by signing a new contract.

=== July ===
Dundee opened their competitive season in the League Cup group stage with a bang, demolishing Bonnyrigg Rose with seven goals including a Curtis Main hat-trick. They followed this up three days later with another win away at Gayfield Park over ex-manager Jim McIntyre’s side Arbroath. In their first 'home' game of the season at Glebe Park due to pitch work still ongoing at Dens Park, Dundee netted two late goals to see off an impressive Annan Athletic side to confirm themselves as group winners and qualify for the second round of the League Cup with a game in hand. They finished off the group stage in style with another clinic against former bogey team Inverness Caledonian Thistle, thumping them for six and confirming their seeding for the second round, with Simon Murray bagging himself a hat-trick in the first 30 minutes.

=== August ===
Dundee opened their league season in nerve-wracking fashion with a trip down the road to Tannadice for a Dundee derby against the newly-promoted Dundee United. After a shaky, end-to-end start, the Dee did enough to earn a point in a close-fought affair. The following week in their home league opener, Dundee returned to Dens Park in style with a late first half blitz helping them earn a comfortable win over Heart of Midlothian. The next match was in the League Cup second round, where Dundee kept their blistering cup form going with a 6–1 demolition of Scottish Championship side Airdrieonians which included six different goalscorers. Returning to league action, Dundee saved a point at Easter Road through a late equaliser from Simon Murray against his old club Hibernian. Less than 24 hours after losing their star player, Luke McCowan, at the transfer window deadline to Celtic, Dundee took on St Mirren in their last match before the international break, in which the Dee came back twice to earn a point at Dens and stay unbeaten.

=== September ===
Dundee lost their first game of the season to start the month, suffering a frustrating but deserved defeat in Dingwall away to Ross County. For the fifth time out of their last 8 cup quarter-finals, Dundee would face Rangers in yet another standard demoralising defeat. The following week, Dundee played better but individual mistakes cost them early at home to an unbeaten Aberdeen side who held on for the win and handed the Dark Blues their first home defeat of the season.

=== October ===
Dundee followed up their miserable September in familiar fashion, where a good performance despite an unjust Mo Sylla red card in the first half left them defending a slender lead over winless Kilmarnock. Dundee would even double their lead late on, but once again suffered a total collapse at the back and conceded three very late goals to somehow walk away with nothing, the fourth such instance in manager Tony Docherty's tenure which saw a multi-goal lead erased and replaced with a defeat. After a much needed international break, Dundee returned with a new line-up and a much more solid defensive performance away to Motherwell where they held onto a single goal victory to end their horrible streak of form and gain their first league clean sheet of the season. Any attempt to build off of the previous week's result however was for nought, as despite taking an early lead against St Johnstone, Dundee would play poorly and suffer yet another collapse and defeat in stoppage time to lose their third consecutive home game. Dundee would end another disappointing month with the toughest of fixtures, holding off Celtic in Glasgow for an hour before an expected defeat which dropped the Dee down to 10th place.

=== November ===
The month started with a tremendous reversal of fortune against Kilmarnock, with Dundee going down by two goals before making a comeback to win the game in the last minute through a Ziyad Larkeche goal, handing both Tony Docherty and Dundee's first wins over respective former colleague and long-time adversary Derek McInnes and putting the Dee back up to 6th place. Momentum was again brought to a complete halt the following week however, as failing to take chances in a solid first half followed by a drubbing filled with all-too familiar defensive mistakes in the second half resulted in a comfortable defeat to high-flying Aberdeen at Pittodrie. After yet another international break, an early red card for struggling bottom side Hibs paved the way for a convincing home win for Dundee. The Dee finished November playing Kilmarnock for the third time in two months, and in another even affair two late goals apiece marked Dundee's first draw since August.

=== December ===
The Dee continued their uptick in form with another impressive display at Dens, where a scoring whirlwind helped seal a 4–1 win over Motherwell, lifting Dundee up to 5th place and marking the first time since April 2002 that they had won three consecutive home games in the top tier. That uplift in form came to a quick end a few days later, as Dundee were easily defeated at Tynecastle Park by bottom side Hearts to drop to 6th. After a fortnight break, Dundee kept it close at Ibrox but still fell to a narrow defeat away to Rangers. Dundee then served up their third Boxing Day stinker in 4 years, taking another beating off of Ross County at Dens, giving the Staggies their first away win in 25 games in a 0–3 drubbing which left Dundee in 9th place, 5 points off the bottom. The Dee managed to halt the bad form in their last game of 2024, fighting back against two early injuries with a makeshift defence to earn a 1–2 away win against an in-form St Mirren through a double from captain Simon Murray.

=== January ===
Dundee suffered a very bad start to the year with a late loss at home to local rivals Dundee United and other results going against their favour compounding to leave the Dark Blues two points above the relegation play-off places. In a situation where they needed to make their own luck to compete with other teams' hot streaks, Dundee bounced back with three early goals to sink bottom side St Johnstone in Perth and earn a much-needed win ahead of a gruelling slate of games, consisting of three league games against Old Firm opposition and a Dundee derby cup clash. Dundee started this tough set of fixtures well despite struggling with injuries to several key squad members, as they earned a well-deserved point at home to Rangers. They followed this up with another impressive draw at home to league leaders Celtic, with a late penalty stopping Dundee from claiming a first home victory against the Glasgow side in 36 years. Keeping up their gutsy form amid squad health issues, Dundee got revenge against rivals Dundee United in the Scottish Cup, with a first minute Simon Murray goal and both strong defending and an excellent performance from Trevor Carson gave the Dee their first Dundee derby win since 2017, and their first win over United in the Scottish Cup since 1956. Dundee's last game of their gauntlet would not come in January however, as their away trip to Celtic Park was postponed due to stadium damage caused by Storm Éowyn.

=== February ===
The month of February started off in the absolute worst way possible for the Dee, as they were dealt a humbling and deserved 0–6 defeat at Dens Park by Hearts, their worst home defeat since 2017, leaving Tony Docherty's men just one point off the relegation play-offs and in a fight to stay up. Things did not get any better in the midweek, as their previously postponed trip to face Celtic ended with the same humiliating scoreline, the first time since 2000 that Dundee (or any top division Scottish side) had conceded at least 6 goals in two consecutive games. Dundee were able to get back on track in the Scottish Cup fifth round in a dominant win over Scottish Championship side Airdrieonians to make it into the last 8, in a game which saw the return to competitive play for Dee captain Joe Shaughnessy for the first time since his injury in April 2024. Back in league action, Dundee's woes continued with another home defeat, this time to an Aberdeen side who hadn't won in 14 consecutive league games, and found themselves in the relegation play-off spot. In the next game up in the Highlands, an early lead didn't count for much as two quick second half goals for Ross County blew an unprepared Dundee away and consigned them to a fourth consecutive league defeat. Tony Docherty would change formation for the midweek game away to Motherwell, but it didn't have much effect as Dundee slumped to a fifth consecutive league defeat that left them just 3 points ahead of bottom side St Johnstone (after having led them by 12 points at one stage) with the Saintees visiting to start a worryingly crucial March.

=== March ===
The month started off quickly with a bottom of the table clash, and a relatively even and low-quality clash saw both teams walk away with a point, ending Dundee's losing run but remaining winless in 8 straight league games, and remaining 3 points above their opponents St Johnstone. Dundee would travel to Edinburgh for a Scottish Cup quarter-final matchup away to Hearts, and despite an early second half goal from captain Joe Shaughnessy it was not enough to keep up with the standard multiple goals conceded and Dundee were knocked out of the cup at Tynecastle. After a long week, Dundee once again made the short walk across the road to Tannadice Park for the Dundee derby. After a first half blitz, Dundee would earn their first win over Dundee United at Tannadice since August 2004 in a memorable 2–4 victory, ending their 8-game winless streak in the league in style. 13 days later, Dundee took a 2-goal lead over Rangers but their horrendous defensive record once again reared its head as they conceded 3 late goals to miss out on an unexpected but crucial three points.

=== April ===
In their last home pre-split game, Dundee managed their first league clean sheet since October 2024 in a vital home win over St Mirren thanks to a brace from Simon Murray, who extended his scoring streak to six consecutive league games and became joint top scorer in the Premiership. Dundee made the trip to Easter Road the following week to face high-flying Hibs in their final pre-split fixture, and missed out on a chance to jump to 9th with even a draw in a one-sided rout that once again made Dundee's record-breakingly bad defensive record come to the forefront. After a week off, Dundee started their post-split schedule with a third trip of the season away to Tynecastle to play a disgruntled Hearts side which had missed top six and a Scottish Cup final. Despite the heavy struggles they'd had against the Jambos throughout the season, Dundee mustered a crucial win through a rarely seen clean sheet and yet another goal from Simon Murray to lift the Dees out of the relegation play-off places. At the end of April, PFA Scotland announced that Dundee striker Simon Murray had been nominated for the Players' Player of the Year award alongside Celtic players Callum McGregor, Daizen Maeda and Nicolas Kühn. Murray was also named as the Scottish Premiership Player of the Month for April 2025.

=== May ===
In the crucial final month of the season, Dundee started off in terrible fashion after a late home defeat against 10-man Motherwell which was only slightly alleviated by both teams below the Dee also suffering losses. The following week, it was a case of 'too little, too late' at Rugby Park as another spineless and tactically incompetent performance from the Dee led to another multi-goal defeat to Kilmarnock who confirmed their safety, whilst the visitors remained firmly in the relegation conversation with two massive games to go. In a winner-take-all match against relegation rivals Ross County which looked destined for a Dundee win, a scandalous penalty decision by referee Nick Walsh gave the visitors a last minute equaliser which relegated St Johnstone and cost the Dark Blues their assured safety from the play-offs, making their final game of the season away to the now-relegated Perth side a 'must-not-lose' scenario. In their last league game of the season, Dundee filled out three stands at McDiarmid Park as they defeated the already-relegated St Johnstone with two goals from the departing academy product Lyall Cameron which confirmed the Dark Blues' status as a Scottish Premiership club for the next season.

In a sudden and surprising turn at the end of the season, manager Tony Docherty and his entire backroom staff were relieved of their duties the day after confirming Dundee's top flight status.

== Competitions ==
Win Draw Loss Postponed

All times are in British Summer Time (BST).

=== Pre-season and friendlies ===
29 June 2024 Friendly	Arbroath	1–3	Dundee	Gayfield Park, Arbroath
15:00	Murray 66'	Report	Tiffoney 19', 26'; Anderson 49'	Attendance: 1,836

3 July 2024 Friendly	Baník Ostrava	0–3	Dundee	Stadion MKS Promień, Opalenica, Poland
17:00		Report	Graham 53'; Richardson 73'; F. Robertson 76'

6 July 2024 Friendly	Lech Poznań	1–1	Dundee	Stadion Akademii, Wronki, Poland
13:00	Ishak 29'	Report	Palmer-Houlden 59'

10 July 2024 Friendly	Dunfermline Athletic	0–2	Dundee	East End Park, Dunfermline
19:30		Report	Portales 33'; Main 39'	Attendance: 893; Referee: Ryan Lee

=== Scottish Premiership ===
Dundee will play against Aberdeen, Celtic, Dundee United, Heart of Midlothian, Hibernian, Kilmarnock, Motherwell, Rangers, Ross County, St Johnstone and St Mirren in the 2024–25 Premiership campaign. They will play each team three times, twice at home and once away against half of the teams, and once at home and twice away against the other half. Following this, they will be split into either a top or bottom group of six depending on their position after 33 games, where they will play each team in their group once.

The fixtures for the 2024–25 Premiership campaign were released on 27 June 2024 at 09:00, with Dundee's opening game being a Dundee derby at Tannadice Park live on Sky Sports.

4 August 2024 1	Dundee United	2–2	Dundee	Tannadice Park, Dundee
13:30	Trapanovski 13'; Thomson 23'	Report	Palmer-Houlden 18'; McCowan 79' (pen.)	Attendance: 12,616; Referee: David Dickinson

10 August 2024 2	Dundee	3–1	Heart of Midlothian	Dens Park, Dundee
17:30	Tiffoney 23'; Taylor 45+2' (o.g.); McCowan 45+5' (pen.)	Report	Kent 61'	Attendance: 7,266; Referee: Don Robertson

24 August 2024 3	Hibernian	2–2	Dundee	Easter Road, Edinburgh
15:00	Boyle 45'; Bowie 72'	Report	Tiffoney 9'; Murray 88'	Attendance: 15,710; Referee: Colin Steven

31 August 2024 4	Dundee	2–2	St Mirren	Dens Park, Dundee
15:00	Main 30'; Larkeche 54'	Report	Olusanya 26'; Mandron 36'	Attendance: 5,779; Referee: Lloyd Wilson

14 September 2024 5	Ross County	2–0	Dundee	Victoria Park, Dingwall
15:00	Wright 6'; White 45+4' (pen.)	Report		Attendance: 4,068; Referee: Grant Irvine

28 September 2024 6	Dundee	1–2	Aberdeen	Dens Park, Dundee
15:00	Murray 45' (pen.)	Report	Nisbet 15'; Keskinen 32'	Attendance: 9,030; Referee: Calum Scott

5 October 2024 7	Dundee	2–3	Kilmarnock	Dens Park, Dundee
15:00	Larkeche 24'; Sylla (red card) 43'; Adewumi 81'	Report	Kennedy 86', 90+4'; Anderson 88'	Attendance: 5,316; Referee: Grant Irvine

19 October 2024 8	Motherwell	0–1	Dundee	Fir Park, Motherwell
15:00		Report	Cameron 38'	Attendance: 5,084; Referee: Euan Anderson

26 October 2024 9	Dundee	1–2	St Johnstone	Dens Park, Dundee
15:00	Murray 12'	Report	Carey 64'; Clark 90'	Attendance: 6,548; Referee: Kevin Clancy

30 October 2024 10	Celtic	2–0	Dundee	Celtic Park, Glasgow
19:45	Johnston 60'; Engels 67' (pen.)	Report		Attendance: 58,751; Referee: Ross Hardie

3 November 2024 11*	Dundee	3–2	Kilmarnock	Dens Park, Dundee
15:15*	Palmer-Houlden 41'; McGhee 56'; Larkeche 90+4'	Report	Anderson 24'; Kennedy 40'	Attendance: 5,014; Referee: Dan McFarlane
Note: Game was brought forward with the agreement of both clubs. Original date was 11 January 2025. Kick-off delayed 15 minutes due to an incident in the stadium.

9 November 2024 12	Aberdeen	4–1	Dundee	Pittodrie Stadium, Aberdeen
17:30	Palaversa 53'; Keskinen 57'; Besuijen 72'; Nisbet 90+7'	Report	Murray 70'	Attendance: 19,274; Referee: David Dickinson

23 November 2024 13	Dundee	4–1	Hibernian	Dens Park, Dundee
18:00	McGhee 26'; Triantis 31' (o.g.); Palmer-Houlden 45+2'; Main 90+2'	Report	N. Cadden 2'; Obita (red card) 12'	Attendance: 5,310; Referee: Nick Walsh

30 November 2024 14	Kilmarnock	1–1	Dundee	Rugby Park, Kilmarnock
15:00	Wales 80'	Report	Cameron 71'	Attendance: 5,454; Referee: Ross Hardie

4 December 2024 15	Dundee	4–1	Motherwell	Dens Park, Dundee
19:45	Adewumi 14'; Tiffoney 60'; Cameron 63', 67'	Report	Stamatelopoulos 19'	Attendance: 5,381; Referee: John Beaton

7 December 2024 16	Heart of Midlothian	2–0	Dundee	Tynecastle Park, Edinburgh
15:00	Shankland 21', 31'	Report		Attendance: 18,737; Referee: Colin Steven

21 December 2024 17	Rangers	1–0	Dundee	Ibrox Stadium, Glasgow
15:00	Černý 46'	Report		Attendance: 47,208; Referee: Matthew MacDermid

26 December 2024 18	Dundee	0–3	Ross County	Dens Park, Dundee
15:00		Report	Chilvers 23'; Nisbet 70'; White 78' (pen.)	Attendance: 5,207; Referee: Don Robertson

29 December 2024 19	St Mirren	1–2	Dundee	St Mirren Park, Paisley
15:00	Olusanya 40'	Report	Murray 29', 66'	Attendance: 6,798; Referee: Nick Walsh

2 January 2025 20	Dundee	1–2	Dundee United	Dens Park, Dundee
17:30	Murray 61' (pen.)	Report	Ševelj 65'; Dalby 88'	Attendance: 11,585; Referee: Steven McLean

5 January 2025 21	St Johnstone	1–3	Dundee	McDiarmid Park, Perth
15:00	McPake 67'	Report	Murray 3'; Palmer-Houlden 10'; Cameron 22'	Attendance: 5,246; Referee: David Dickinson

9 January 2025 22	Dundee	1–1	Rangers	Dens Park, Dundee
20:00	Adewumi 6'	Report	Černý 34'	Attendance: 8,606; Referee: Calum Scott

14 January 2025 23	Dundee	3–3	Celtic	Dens Park, Dundee
20:00	Adewumi 41'; Carter-Vickers 54' (o.g.); Donnelly 78'	Report	McCowan 5'; Yang 53'; Engels 90+3' (pen.)	Attendance: 8,816; Referee: Don Robertson

1 February 2025 24	Dundee	0–6	Heart of Midlothian	Dens Park, Dundee
15:00		Report	Shankland 15'; Spittal 17'; Kabangu 51', 77'; Drammeh 67'; Vargas 90+2'	Attendance: 7,458; Referee: Lloyd Wilson

5 February 2025 25*	Celtic	6–0	Dundee	Celtic Park, Glasgow
19:45	Engels 18', 71' (pen.); Idah 45+1'; Maeda 55', 59'; Kühn 81'	Report		Attendance: 58,541; Referee: Colin Steven
Note: Initially postponed and rescheduled due to stadium damage caused by Storm Éowyn. Original date was 25 January 2025.

15 February 2025 26	Dundee	1–2	Aberdeen	Dens Park, Dundee
15:00	Palmer-Houlden 54'	Report	Nisbet 29'; Keskinen 52'	Attendance: 7,632; Referee: Grant Irvine

22 February 2025 27	Ross County	3–1	Dundee	Victoria Park, Dingwall
15:00	Phillips 18'; Wright 47'; Chilvers 49'	Report	Murray 4'	Attendance: 4,075; Referee: Matthew MacDermid

26 February 2025 28	Motherwell	2–1	Dundee	Fir Park, Motherwell
19:45	Casey 12', 84'	Report	Murray 79'	Attendance: 4,258; Referee: Lloyd Wilson

1 March 2025 29	Dundee	1–1	St Johnstone	Dens Park, Dundee
15:00	Murray 43'	Report	Kirk 40'	Attendance: 7,681; Referee: Steven McLean

16 March 2025 30	Dundee United	2–4	Dundee	Tannadice Park, Dundee
15:00	Middleton 31'; Trapanovski 49'; Adegboyega (red card) 90+5'	Report	McGhee 17', 39'; Tiffoney 23'; Murray 90+7' (pen.)	Attendance: 13,000; Referee: Nick Walsh

29 March 2025 31	Dundee	3–4	Rangers	Dens Park, Dundee
17:30	Murray 2'; Shaughnessy 19'; Tiffoney 62'	Report	Shaughnessy 43' (o.g.); Tavernier 75'; Lawrence 81'; Dessers 90+3'	Attendance: 8,710; Referee: David Dickinson

5 April 2025 32	Dundee	2–0	St Mirren	Dens Park, Dundee
15:00	Murray 2', 63'	Report		Attendance: 6,580; Referee: John Beaton

13 April 2025 33	Hibernian	4–0	Dundee	Easter Road, Edinburgh
14:30	Bushiri 26'; Bowie 68', 84'; Gayle 78'	Report		Attendance: 17,926; Referee: Chris Graham

26 April 2025 34	Heart of Midlothian	0–1	Dundee	Tynecastle Park, Edinburgh
15:00		Report	Murray 38'	Attendance: 18,085; Referee: Ross Hardie

3 May 2025 35	Dundee	1–2	Motherwell	Dens Park, Dundee
15:00	Portales 31'	Report	Sparrow 59'; Koutroumbis (red card) 80'; Maswanhise 90+1'	Attendance: 5,692; Referee: Kevin Clancy

10 May 2025 36	Kilmarnock	3–2	Dundee	Rugby Park, Kilmarnock
15:00	Armstrong 31' (pen.); Anderson 77'; Deas 90+1'	Report	Cameron 76', 90+5'	Attendance: 5,669; Referee: Don Robertson

14 May 2025 37	Dundee	1–1	Ross County	Dens Park, Dundee
19:45	Tiffoney 55'	Report	Hale 90+6' (pen.)	Attendance: 5,905; Referee: Nick Walsh

18 May 2025 38	St Johnstone	0–2	Dundee	McDiarmid Park, Perth
15:00		Report	Cameron 28', 90+6' (pen.)	Attendance: 7,170; Referee: Steven McLean

==== League table ====
Pos	Team	Pld	W	D	L	GF	GA	GD	Pts	Qualification or relegation (Note: Teams play each other three times (33 matches), before the league is split into two groups (the top six and the bottom six).)
8	Motherwell	38	14	7	17	46	63	−17	49	
9	Kilmarnock	38	12	8	18	45	64	−19	44	
10	Dundee	38	11	8	19	57	77	−20	41	
11	Ross County (R)	38	9	10	19	37	65	−28	37	Qualification for the Premiership play-off final
12	St Johnstone (R)	38	9	5	24	38	68	−30	32	Relegation to Championship

Rules for classification: 1) Points; 2) Goal difference; 3) Goals scored; 4) Head-to-head points; 5) Head-to-head goal difference; 6) Play-off (only if deciding champion, UEFA competitions qualification, second stage group allocation or relegation).
(R) Relegated

==== Results by round ====
Round	1	2	3	4	5	6	7	8	9	10	11	12	13	14	15	16	17	18	19	20	21	22	23	24	25	26	27	28	29	30	31	32	33	34	35	36	37	38
Ground	A	H	A	H	A	H	H	A	H	A	H	A	H	A	H	A	A	H	A	H	A	H	H	H	A	H	A	A	H	A	H	H	A	A	H	A	H	A
Result	D	W	D	D	L	L	L	W	L	L	W	L	W	D	W	L	L	L	W	L	W	D	D	L	L	L	L	L	D	W	L	W	L	W	L	L	D	W
Position	4	3	4	6	6	8	8	6	8	10	6	7	7	7	5	6	7	9	8	9	8	7	7	10	10	11	11	11	11	11	11	11	11	10	10	10	10	10

Source: Competitive matches
A = Away; H = Home; W = Win; D = Draw; L = Loss

=== Scottish Cup ===
Dundee will compete in the Scottish Cup and will enter the competition in the fourth round.

20 January 2025 Fourth round	Dundee	1–0	Dundee United	Dens Park, Dundee
20:00	Murray 1'	Report		Attendance: 9,294; Referee: Matthew MacDermid

8 February 2025 Fifth round	Dundee	4–0	Airdrieonians	Dens Park, Dundee
15:00	C. Robertson 13'; Cameron 25', 44'; Adewumi 40'	Report		Attendance: 4,335; Referee: Euan Anderson

7 March 2025 Quarter-finals	Heart of Midlothian	3–1	Dundee	Tynecastle Park, Edinburgh
19:45	Kartum 27', 68'; Murray 63' (o.g.)	Report	Shaughnessy 50'	Attendance: 17,975; Referee: Kevin Clancy

=== Scottish League Cup ===
Dundee will compete in the Scottish League Cup and entered the competition in the group stage. The draw for the group stage was held on 29 May 2024 at 13:00, broadcast live on Premier Sports. Dundee were drawn into Group D with Inverness Caledonian Thistle, Arbroath, Annan Athletic and Bonnyrigg Rose. Due to work on the pitch at Dens Park, Dundee played their home group stage fixtures at Glebe Park.

==== Group stage ====
13 July 2024 1	Bonnyrigg Rose	1–7	Dundee	New Dundas Park, Bonnyrigg
15:00	Osadolor 75'	Report	Main 12', 31', 79'; Portales 15'; Cameron 17', 63'; Astley 52'	Attendance: 987; Referee: Dan McFarlane

16 July 2024 2	Arbroath	0–2	Dundee	Gayfield Park, Arbroath
19:45		Report	McCowan 51' (pen.); Ingram 78'	Attendance: 1,796; Referee: Chris Graham

23 July 2024 3	Dundee	3–1	Annan Athletic	Glebe Park, Brechin (Note: Relocated due to pitch work at Dens Park.)
19:45	Murray 34', 85'; Palmer-Houlden 90+1'	Report	Goss 40'	Attendance: 888; Referee: Iain Snedden

27 July 2024 4	Dundee	6–0	Inverness Caledonian Thistle	Glebe Park, Brechin
15:00	Murray 1', 18', 29'; Palmer-Houlden 23', 39'; Portales 79'	Report		Attendance: 1,057; Referee: John Beaton

==== Knockout stage ====
Dundee were seeded in the second round as one of the three best group winners. The draw took place following the final group stage game on 28 July.

17 August 2024 Second round	Dundee	6–1	Airdrieonians	Dens Park, Dundee
15:00	Palmer-Houlden 12'; McGhee 40'; Tiffoney 61'; Portales 74'; Main 86'; Cameron 90+1'	Report	MacDonald (red card) 63'; Frizzell 76'	Attendance: 3,327; Referee: Euan Anderson

21 September 2024 Quarter-finals	Rangers	3–0	Dundee	Ibrox Stadium, Glasgow
17:30	Dessers 18', 66'; Tavernier 50' (pen.)	Report		Attendance: 33,665; Referee: Chris Graham

==== Group D table ====
Pos	Team	Pld	W	PW	PL	L	GF	GA	GD	Pts	Qualification	DND	ANN	ARB	ICT	BON
1	Dundee	4	4	0	0	0	18	2	+16	12	Qualification for the second round	—	3–1	—	6–0	—
2	Annan Athletic	4	2	0	1	1	7	5	+2	7		—	—	—	1–0	2–2p
3	Arbroath	4	1	1	0	2	1	5	−4	5		0–2	0–3	—	—	—
4	Inverness Caledonian Thistle	4	1	0	1	2	3	7	−4	4		—	—	0–0p	—	3–0
5	Bonnyrigg Rose	4	0	1	0	3	3	13	−10	2		1–7	—	0–1	—	—

Rules for classification: 1) goal difference, 2) goals scored, 3) away goals scored, 4) matches won, 5) away matches won, 6) drawing of lots.

== Squad statistics ==
As of 18 May 2025

No.	Pos	Nat	Player	Total		Premiership		Scottish Cup		League Cup	
No.	Pos	Nat	Player	Apps	Goals	Apps	Goals	Apps	Goals	Apps	Goals
1	GK	(Scotland) SCO	Jon McCracken	20	0	16	0	1	0	3	0
2	DF	(England) ENG	Ethan Ingram	31	1	12+12	0	1	0	5+1	1
3	DF	(Scotland) SCO	Clark Robertson	23	1	21	0	2	1	0	0
4	DF	(Wales) WAL	Ryan Astley	33	1	24+2	0	2	0	3+2	1
5	DF	(Republic of Ireland) IRL	Joe Shaughnessy	13	2	10+1	1	1+1	1	0	0
6	DF	(Scotland) SCO	Jordan McGhee	31	5	20+3	4	2	0	6	1
7	MF	(Scotland) SCO	Scott Tiffoney	43	7	21+14	6	1+1	0	4+2	1
8	MF	(Scotland) SCO	Josh Mulligan	41	0	29+5	0	2	0	1+4	0
10	MF	(Scotland) SCO	Lyall Cameron	41	14	32+1	9	2	2	5+1	3
11	MF	(Austria) AUT	Oluwaseun Adewumi	32	5	20+8	4	3	1	1	0
12	DF	(England) ENG	Imari Samuels	5	0	1+2	0	0+2	0	0	0
13	GK	(England) ENG	Adam Legzdins	0	0	0	0	0	0	0	0
14	MF	(Mexico) MEX	César Garza	11	0	5+4	0	2	0	0	0
15	FW	(Scotland) SCO	Simon Murray	46	22	36+2	16	3	1	4+1	5
18	FW	(Scotland) SCO	Charlie Reilly	8	0	0+6	0	0+1	0	0+1	0
19	MF	(Scotland) SCO	Finlay Robertson	38	0	15+15	0	2+1	0	4+1	0
20	DF	(France) FRA	Billy Koumetio	20	0	14+5	0	0	0	1	0
21	DF	(France) FRA	Ziyad Larkeche	31	3	25+2	3	2	0	2	0
23	FW	(England) ENG	Seb Palmer-Houlden	39	9	18+15	5	0+1	0	2+3	4
26	MF	(Scotland) SCO	Scott Fraser	5	0	1+4	0	0	0	0	0
27	MF	(Mexico) MEX	Víctor López	1	0	0	0	0+1	0	0	0
28	MF	(France) FRA	Mohamed Sylla	42	0	31+2	0	1+2	0	6	0
29	DF	(Mexico) MEX	Antonio Portales	31	4	23+1	1	1	0	6	3
30	GK	(Scotland) SCO	Harrison Sharp	0	0	0	0	0	0	0	0
31	GK	(Northern Ireland) NIR	Trevor Carson	27	0	22	0	2	0	3	0
50	DF	(Northern Ireland) NIR	Aaron Donnelly	14	1	10+1	1	3	0	0	0
Players away from the club on loan:
25	DF	(Scotland) SCO	Luke Graham	5	0	3	0	0	0	1+1	0
50	FW	(Scotland) SCO	Jamie Richardson	1	0	0	0	0	0	0+1	0
Players who left the club during the season:
9	FW	(England) ENG	Curtis Main	20	6	4+10	2	0	0	3+3	4
16	DF	(Scotland) SCO	Sean Kelly	3	0	0+3	0	0	0	0	0
17	MF	(Scotland) SCO	Luke McCowan	8	3	3	2	0	0	5	1
20	FW	(Scotland) SCO	Zak Rudden	0	0	0	0	0	0	0	0
22	MF	(England) ENG	Sammy Braybrooke	8	0	2+5	0	0	0	1	0
22	DF	(Scotland) SCO	Cammy Kerr	0	0	0	0	0	0	0	0
24	MF	(Scotland) SCO	Max Anderson	0	0	0	0	0	0	0	0
47	MF	(France) FRA	Julien Vetro	6	0	0+5	0	0	0	0+1	0
55	DF	(Scotland) SCO	Sebastian Lochhead	0	0	0	0	0	0	0	0

== Transfers ==
=== Summer ===
==== Players in ====
Date	Player	From	Fee
21 June 2024	(Scotland) Jon McCracken	(England) Norwich City	Free
21 June 2024	(Scotland) Clark Robertson	(Israel) Ashdod	Free
21 June 2024	(England) Seb Palmer-Houlden	(England) Bristol City	Loan
4 July 2024	(England) Ethan Ingram	(England) West Bromwich Albion	Free
10 July 2024	(Scotland) Simon Murray	(Scotland) Ross County	Undisclosed
30 July 2024	(France) Ziyad Larkeche	(England) Queen's Park Rangers	Loan
9 August 2024	(France) Billy Koumetio	(England) Liverpool	Free
28 August 2024	(England) Sammy Braybrooke	(England) Leicester City	Loan
29 August 2024	(France) Julien Vetro	(England) Burnley	Loan
30 August 2024	(Austria) Oluwaseun Adewumi	(England) Burnley	Loan

==== Players out ====
Date	Player	To	Fee
24 June 2024	(Scotland) Lee Ashcroft	(Scotland) Partick Thistle	Mutual consent
12 July 2024	(Scotland) Zak Rudden	(Scotland) Queen's Park	Mutual consent
16 July 2024	(Scotland) Cammy Kerr	(Scotland) Queen's Park	Mutual consent
22 July 2024	(Mexico) Diego Pineda	(Mexico) Venados	Mutual consent
24 July 2024	(Scotland) Max Anderson	(England) Crawley Town	Undisclosed
26 July 2024	(Scotland) Ruaridh Lynch	(Scotland) Cowdenbeath	Loan
9 August 2024	(Scotland) Jamie Richardson	(Scotland) Arbroath	Loan
9 August 2024	(Scotland) Finlay Allan	(Scotland) Stenhousemuir	Loan
9 August 2024	(Scotland) Lewis Lorimer	(Scotland) Bonnyrigg Rose	Loan
30 August 2024	(Scotland) Sebastian Lochhead	(England) Wolverhampton Wanderers	£300,000
30 August 2024	(Scotland) Luke McCowan	(Scotland) Celtic	£1,000,000

=== Winter ===
==== Players in ====
Date	Player	From	Fee
20 September 2024	(Scotland) Scott Fraser	(England) Charlton Athletic	Free
28 November 2024	(Scotland) Sean Kelly	(Cyprus) Karmiotissa	Free
22 December 2024	(Mexico) César Garza	(Mexico) Monterrey	Loan
1 January 2025	(Scotland) Luke Graham	(Scotland) Falkirk	Return from loan
8 January 2025	(Northern Ireland) Aaron Donnelly	(England) Nottingham Forest	Undisclosed
13 January 2025	(England) Imari Samuels	(England) Brighton & Hove Albion	Undisclosed
22 January 2025	(Mexico) Víctor López	(Mexico) Querétaro	Loan

==== Players out ====
Date	Player	To	Fee
14 September 2024	(Scotland) Rayan Mohammed	(Scotland) Forfar Athletic	Loan
20 September 2024	(Scotland) Luke Graham	(Scotland) Falkirk	Loan
26 September 2024	(Scotland) Finlay Allan	(Scotland) Forfar Athletic	Loan
1 October 2024	(Scotland) Charlie Reilly	(Scotland) Inverness CT	Loan
4 January 2025	(Scotland) Sean Kelly	(Scotland) Partick Thistle	End of contract
13 January 2025	(England) Sammy Braybrooke	(England) Leicester City	End of loan
22 January 2025	(France) Julien Vetro	(England) Burnley	End of loan
25 January 2025	(England) Curtis Main	(Scotland) Ayr United	Mutual consent
4 February 2025	(Scotland) Luke Graham	(Scotland) Falkirk	Loan
7 February 2025	(Scotland) Jamie Richardson	(Scotland) Dundee North End	Loan
14 February 2025	(Scotland) Ally Graham	(England) Nottingham Forest	Undisclosed

=== End of season ===
==== New deals and extensions ====
Date	Player	Until
4 February 2025	(Scotland) Finlay Robertson	May 2027
14 February 2025	(Scotland) Harrison Sharp	May 2027
12 June 2025	(Scotland) Charlie Reilly	May 2026

==== Players out ====
Date	Player	To	Fee
21 May 2025	(England) Seb Palmer-Houlden	(England) Bristol City	Loan ended
21 May 2025	(Austria) Oluwaseun Adewumi	(England) Burnley	Loan ended
21 May 2025	(France) Ziyad Larkeche	(England) Queen's Park Rangers	Loan ended
31 May 2025	(Scotland) Lyall Cameron	(Scotland) Rangers	Compensation
31 May 2025	(Scotland) Jordan McGhee	(Scotland) Motherwell	End of contract
3 June 2025	(Scotland) Jamie Richardson	(Scotland) Forfar Athletic	End of contract
17 June 2025	(France) Mohamed Sylla	(Scotland) Livingston	End of contract
17 June 2025	(Scotland) Scott Fraser	(Scotland) Brechin City	End of contract
17 June 2025	(Mexico) Antonio Portales	(Mexico) Jaiba Brava	End of contract
17 June 2025	(Scotland) Scott Tiffoney	(Scotland) Kilmarnock	End of contract
17 June 2025	(Republic of Ireland) Joe Shaughnessy	(Australia) Newcastle Jets	End of contract
17 June 2025	(England) Adam Legzdins	Retired	End of contract
27 June 2025	(Scotland) Josh Mulligan	(Scotland) Hibernian	Compensation

== End of season awards ==
=== Club awards ===
- Andrew De Vries Player of the Year: Simon Murray
- Isobel Sneddon Young Player of the Year: Oluwaseun Adewumi
- Players' Player of the Year: Simon Murray

=== National awards ===
Scottish Professional Football League

- Scottish Premiership Player of the Month (April 2025): Simon Murray

PFA Scotland

- Players' Player of the Year nominee: Simon Murray

Scottish Football Writers' Association

- Footballer of the Year nominee: Simon Murray

== See also ==
- List of Dundee F.C. seasons
