= 2024–25 Querétaro F.C. season =

Querétaro F.C.
2024–25 season
- Manager: Mauro Gerk (until 6 December)
- Stadium: Estadio Corregidora
- Liga MX Torneo Apertura: 17th
- Leagues Cup: Group stage

The 2024–25 season is Querétaro's 75th's season in existence and their 16th consecutive appearance in the top flight. In addition to the domestic league, the team is scheduled to participate in the Leagues Cup.

== Transfers ==
=== In ===
Pos.	Player	Transferred from	Fee	Date	Source
MF	(Mexico) Alan Medina	(Mexico) América	Undisclosed	3 July 2024	
FW	(Mexico) Víctor López	(Mexico) Monterrey	Free	3 July 2024	
MF	(Argentina) Lucas Rodríguez	(Mexico) Club Tijuana	Undisclosed	3 July 2024	
FW	(Mexico) Ronaldo Cisneros	(Mexico) CD Guadalajara	Loan	3 July 2024	
DF	(Argentina) Franco Russo	(Bulgaria) Ludogorets Razgrad	Loan	16 July 2024	

== Competitions ==
=== Overall record ===
Competition	First match	Last match	Starting round	Record							
Competition	First match	Last match	Starting round	Pld	W	D	L	GF	GA	GD	Win %
Liga MX Apertura	6 July 2024	8 November 2024	Matchday 1	4	0	0	4	3	9	−6	0.00
Leagues Cup	28 July 2024		Group stage	0	0	0	0	0	0	+0	—
Total				4	0	0	4	3	9	−6	0.00

Last updated: 20 July 2024
Source: Competitions

=== Liga MX ===
==== Torneo Apertura ====
Pos	Team	Pld	W	D	L	GF	GA	GD	Pts
14	Mazatlán	17	2	8	7	10	19	−9	14
15	Puebla	17	4	2	11	17	31	−14	14
16	Pachuca	17	3	4	10	20	29	−9	13
17	Querétaro	17	3	3	11	13	31	−18	12
18	Santos Laguna	17	2	4	11	12	30	−18	10

Source: Liga MX
Rules for classification: 1) Points; 2) Goal difference; 3) Number of goals scored; 4) Head-to-head results between tied teams; 5) Number of goals scored away; 6) Highest relegation coefficient; 7) Fair Play points

==== Results summary ====
Overall								Home						Away					
Pld	W	D	L	GF	GA	GD	Pts	W	D	L	GF	GA	GD	W	D	L	GF	GA	GD
4	0	0	4	3	9	−6	0	0	0	2	1	4	−3	0	0	2	2	5	−3

Last updated: 20 July 2024.

==== Results by round ====
Round	1	2	3	4
Ground	H	A	H	A
Result	L	L	L	L
Position	13	18	18	18

Updated to match(es) played on 20 July 2024. Source:
A = Away; H = Home; W = Win; D = Draw; L = Loss

==== Matches ====
The match schedule was released on 6 June 2024.

6 July 2024 1	Querétaro	1–2	Tijuana	Querétaro
19:00 UTC−6	Escamilla (yellow card) 45+3'; Sosa (yellow card) 54', (goal) 62'; Manzanarez (yellow card) 78'		González 21'; Blanco 68'	Stadium: Estadio Corregidora; Referee: Luis Alfredo García Rodríguez

12 July 2024 2	América	3–1	Querétaro	Mexico City
19:00 UTC−6	Dilrosun 2'; Martín 8', 56'; Reyes (yellow card) 90+2'		Hernández (yellow card) 13'; Barrera 45+3'; Manzanarez (yellow card) 65'	Stadium: Estadio Ciudad de los Deportes; Referee: Katia Itzel García

16 July 2024 3	Querétaro	0–2	Guadalajara	Querétaro
19:00 UTC−6	Sosa (yellow card) 75'; Venegas (yellow card) 90+13'		Cowell 21'; Mozzo 90+7'; González (yellow card) 90+13'	Stadium: Estadio Corregidora; Referee: Fernando Hernández

20 July 2024 4	Monterrey	2–1	Querétaro	Guadalupe
19:00 UTC−6	Canales (penalty missed) 29'; Berterame 29'; Guzmán (yellow card) 34'; Rojas 66'		Lértora (yellow card) 33'; Manzanarez (yellow card) 37'; Río (yellow card) 78'; López 88'	Stadium: Estadio BBVA; Referee: Víctor Alfonso Cáceres Hernández

=== Leagues Cup ===
==== Group stage ====
Pos	Team	Pld	W	PW	PL	L	GF	GA	GD	Pts	Qualification
1	(United States) FC Cincinnati	2	2	0	0	0	5	2	+3	6	Advance to knockout stage
2	(United States) New York City FC	2	0	1	0	1	2	4	−2	2	Advance to knockout stage
3	(Mexico) Querétaro	2	0	0	1	1	0	1	−1	1	

Source: Leagues Cup
Rules for classification: Tiebreakers

28 July 2024 1	New York City FC (United States)	0–0 (4–3 p)	(Mexico) Querétaro	New York, New York, United States
20:00 UTC−4		Report		Stadium: Yankee Stadium
	Penalties
	Martínez (penalty scored); Thiago Martins (penalty scored); Moralez (penalty scored); Mijatović (penalty scored)		(penalty scored) Barrera; (penalty scored) Sosa; (penalty scored) Lértora; (penalty missed) Escamilla; (penalty missed) Cisneros

1 August 2024 2	FC Cincinnati (United States)	1–0	(Mexico) Querétaro	Cincinnati, Ohio, United States
20:00 UTC−4				Stadium: TQL Stadium
