= Jamie Richardson =

Scottish footballer

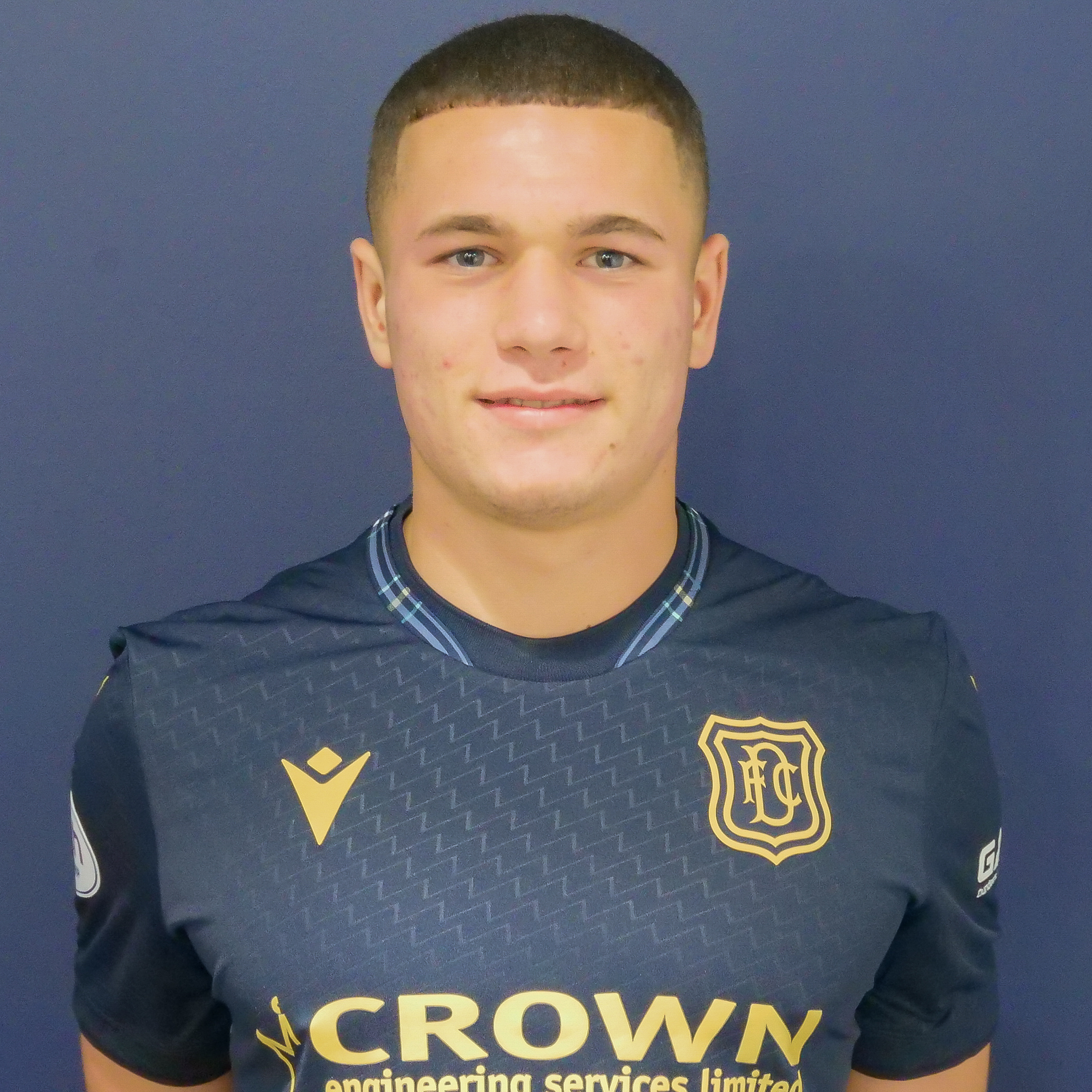
- Jamie Richardson in 2023

Personal information
- Date of birth: 12 February 2005 (age 21)
- Place of birth: Dundee, Scotland
- Position: Forward

Team information
- Current team: Lochee United (on loan from Forfar Athletic)

Youth career
- Dundee

Senior career*
Years	Team	Apps	(Gls)
2021–2025	Dundee	0	(0)
2023	→ Dundee North End (loan)	9	(7)
2023	→ Dundee North End (loan)	7	(5)
2024	→ Brechin City (loan)	18	(3)
2024	→ Arbroath (loan)	4	(0)
2025	→ Dundee North End (loan)	10	(6)
2025–	Forfar Athletic	24	(0)
2026–	→ Lochee United (loan)	0	(0)
- * Club domestic league appearances and goals as of 4 May 2026

Jamie Richardson (born 12 February 2005) is a Scottish professional footballer who plays as a striker for Lowland League East club Lochee United, on loan from Scottish League Two club Forfar Athletic. He came through the ranks of Dundee, and while there he went on loan with Dundee North End (three spells), Brechin City and Arbroath.

== Career ==
Richardson came through Dundee's youth setup, and made his senior debut with the Dundee B team against Peterhead in the 2021–22 Scottish Challenge Cup. He would sign his first full-time contract in June 2022. In March 2023, Richardson would join Midlands Football League club Dundee North End on loan until the end of the season. He would make his debut on 25 March off the bench in a home win over Lochee United. Richardson scored his first goal for the Dokens on 8 April in a home league win over Coupar Angus. This would spark a scoring streak for Richardson, and would average a goal every game through the month of April. He would conclude the season in success after winning the North-Tayside Inter Regional Cup.

On 23 September 2023, Richardson returned on loan to Dundee North End. He made his return the same day in the North-Tayside Inter Regional Cup, where he would score and be named man of the match in an away cup win against Kirriemuir Thistle. After another successful loan spell, Richardson was recalled by Dundee on 12 January 2024 and sent on loan to Highland League club Brechin City. He made his debut the following day off the bench in a league win over Rothes. Richardson scored his first goals for the Hedgemen on 27 January, netting a brace in an away win over Strathspey Thistle.

On 13 July 2024, Richardson made his first team debut for Dundee as a substitute in a 1–7 away victory over Bonnyrigg Rose in the Scottish League Cup group stage. On 9 August 2024, Richardson joined Scottish League One club Arbroath on loan until January 2025. He made his debut from the bench the following day in an Angus derby draw at home to Montrose. On 6 January 2025, Arbroath announced that Richardson had returned to his parent club. On 7 February 2025, Richardson returned on loan to Dundee North End until the end of the season, marking his third stint with the Dokens. The next day, Richardson scored in his third debut for North End in an away league win over Dundee St James. On 26 April, Richardson scored a hat-trick as North End defeated East Craigie to confirm themselves as Midlands Football League champions.

On 3 June 2025 after his Dundee contract expired, Richardson joined Scottish League Two club Forfar Athletic on a one-year deal. On 12 August, Richardson scored his first goal for the Loons in a Scottish Challenge Cup victory over Hibernian U21.

On 22 August 2026, Richardson joined Lowland League East club Lochee United on a loan until January 2027.

== Career statistics ==
As of 15 August 2026

Appearances and goals by club, season and competition
Club	Season	League			National Cup		League Cup		Other		Total	
Club	Season	Division	Apps	Goals	Apps	Goals	Apps	Goals	Apps	Goals	Apps	Goals
Dundee B	2021–22	—			—		—		1 (Note: Appearance(s) in the Scottish Challenge Cup)	0	1	0
Dundee B	2023–24	—			—		—		2	0	2	0
Dundee B	2024–25	—			—		—		2	0	2	0
Dundee B	Total				—		—		5	0	5	0
Dundee	2022–23	Scottish Championship	0	0	0	0	0	0	0	0	0	0
Dundee	2023–24	Scottish Premiership	0	0	0	0	0	0	0	0	0	0
Dundee	2024–25	Scottish Premiership	0	0	0	0	1	0	0	0	1	0
Dundee	Total		0	0	0	0	1	0	0	0	1	0
Dundee North End (loan)	2022–23	Midlands League	9	7	—		—		5 (Note: Appearance(s) in the North-Tayside Inter Regional Cup and the East Region Junior League Cup)	2	14	9
Dundee North End (loan)	2023–24	Midlands League	7	5	—		—		2 (Note: Appearance(s) in the North-Tayside Inter Regional Cup and the Scottish Junior Cup)	1	9	6
Brechin City (loan)	2023–24	Highland League	18	3	—		—		0	0	18	3
Arbroath (loan)	2024–25	Scottish League One	4	0	0	0	—		—		4	0
Dundee North End (loan)	2024–25	Midlands League	10	6	—		—		7 (Note: Appearance(s) in the North-Tayside Inter Regional Cup and the Midlands League Top Half Cup)	1	17	7
Forfar Athletic	2025–26	Scottish League Two	23	0	2	0	4	0	10 (Note: 8 appearances and 1 goal in the Scottish Challenge Cup, and 2 appearances in the Scottish League One play-offs)	1	39	1
Forfar Athletic	2026–27	Scottish League Two	1	0	0	0	4	0	1 (Note: 1 appearance in the Scottish Challenge Cup)	0	6	0
Forfar Athletic	Total		24	0	2	0	8	0	11	1	45	1
Lochee United (loan)	2026–27	Lowland League	0	0	0	0	—		0	0	0	0
Career total			72	21	2	0	9	0	30	5	113	26

== Honours ==
Dundee North End

- North-Tayside Inter Regional Cup: 2022–23
- Midlands Football League: 2024–25
