= Jack Wilkie (footballer, born 2003) =

Scottish footballer (born 2003)

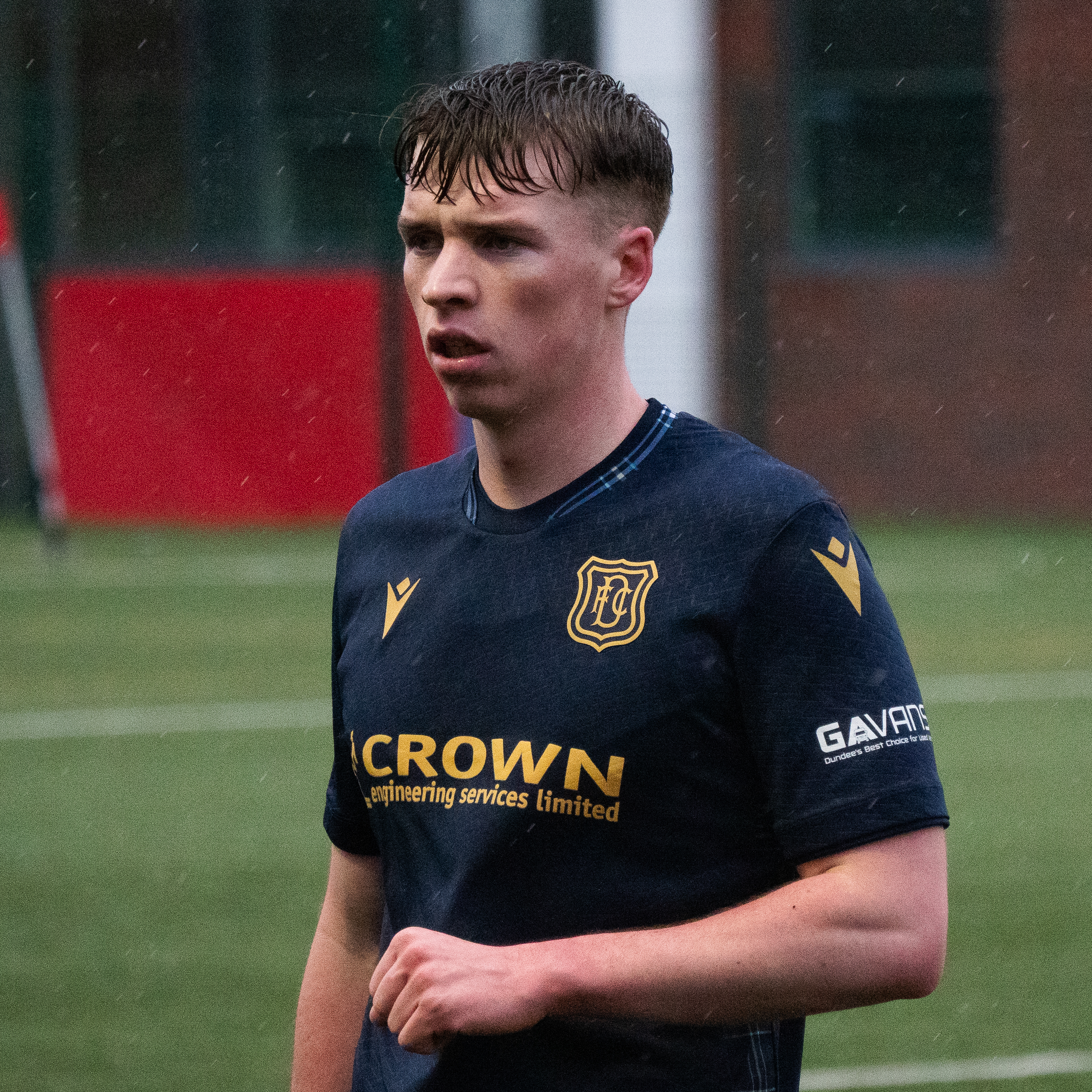
- Jack Wilkie in 2023

Personal information
- Date of birth: 20 December 2003 (age 22)
- Place of birth: Dundee, Scotland
- Position: Defender

Team information
- Current team: Livingston
- Number: 4

Youth career
- Fairmuir Boys Club
- Dundee
- Fairmuir Boys Club
- 2019–2020: Dundee United
- 2020–2023: Dundee

Senior career*
Years	Team	Apps	(Gls)
2020–2024	Dundee	0	(0)
2021–2022	→ East Craigie (loan)	26	(3)
2022–2023	→ Peterhead (loan)	32	(1)
2023–2024	→ Edinburgh City (loan)	9	(1)
2024	→ Broughty Athletic (loan)	12	(0)
2024–2026	Arbroath	71	(2)
2026–	Livingston	3	(0)
- * Club domestic league appearances and goals as of 4 September 2026

Jack Wilkie (born 20 December 2003) is a Scottish professional footballer who plays as a defender for Scottish Championship club Livingston. He has previously played for Dundee and Arbroath, as well as in loan spells for East Craigie, Peterhead, Edinburgh City and Broughty Athletic.

== Career ==
In October 2020, Wilkie made his debut for Dundee in a Scottish League Cup group stage match against Cove Rangers, coming off the bench late on in a 3–0 win.

In June 2021, Wilkie signed his first professional contract with Dundee. In August, Wilkie joined Midlands League side East Craigie on loan. He scored his first goal for the Shipbuilders in a Scottish Junior Cup match against Banchory St Ternan, and would be named Man of the Match in the 7–2 win. In May 2022, Wilkie signed an extension with Dundee which would keep him there for another season.

In Dundee's opening competitive fixture of the 2022–23 season, Wilkie would appear as a substitute in a Scottish League Cup win over Hamilton Academical. On 13 August 2022, Wilkie would join Scottish League One side Peterhead on loan. Wilkie made his debut the same day away to Falkirk. Wilkie would grab his first goal for the Blue Toon on 25 February 2023, equalising to help Peterhead clinch a point against Kelty Hearts. Despite Peterhead being relegated at season's end, Wilkie was named as the club's Young Player of the Year Award winner.

On 4 August 2023, Wilkie joined Scottish League One club Edinburgh City on a season-long loan. The following day, Wilkie made his debut for the Citizens as an early substitution in a league game away to Stirling Albion. Wilkie scored his first Edinburgh City goal on 7 October against Kelty Hearts. After struggling with injury during his loan stint, Wilkie was recalled by Dundee on 18 January 2024.

On 9 February 2024, having played for two senior SFA clubs already in the season, Wilkie joined Midlands League club and SJFA member Broughty Athletic on loan until the end of the season. Wilkie made his debut the following day, starting in a 10–0 league win away to Brechin Victoria. On 20 May, Dundee confirmed that Wilkie would leave at the expiry of his contract.

On 28 May 2024, Wilkie joined Scottish League One club Arbroath. He made his competitive debut on 16 July in a defeat against his former club Dundee in the Scottish League Cup group stage. On 28 September, Wilkie scored his first goal for the Red Lichties in an away league victory over Cove Rangers. On 12 April, Wilkie won the league with Arbroath after a 4–0 home victory over Stenhousemuir.

In May 2026 following another successful season with Arbroath where the part-time side reached the Scottish Premiership play-offs, Wilkie signed with soon-to-be Scottish Championship club Livingston.

== Personal life ==
Wilkie is the son of former Dundee and Dundee United footballer Lee Wilkie.

== Career statistics ==
As of 4 September 2026

Appearances and goals by club, season and competition
Club	Season	League			Scottish Cup		League Cup		Other		Total	
Club	Season	Division	Apps	Goals	Apps	Goals	Apps	Goals	Apps	Goals	Apps	Goals
Dundee	2020–21	Scottish Championship	0	0	0	0	1	0	0	0	1	0
Dundee	2021–22	Scottish Premiership	0	0	0	0	0	0	0	0	0	0
Dundee	2022–23	Scottish Championship	0	0	0	0	1	0	0	0	1	0
Dundee	2023–24	Scottish Premiership	0	0	0	0	1	0	0	0	1	0
Dundee	Total		0	0	0	0	3	0	0	0	3	0
Dundee B	2021–22	—			—		—		1 (Note: Appearances in the Scottish Challenge Cup)	0	1	0
Dundee B	2023–24	—			—		—		2	1	2	1
Dundee B	Total		—		—		—		3	1	3	1
East Craigie (loan)	2021–22	Midlands League	26	3	—		—		8 (Note: Includes appearances in the Scottish Junior Cup, the North & Tayside Inter-Regional Cup and the East of Scotland League Cup)	3	34	6
Peterhead (loan)	2022–23	Scottish League One	30	1	1	0	0	0	1	0	32	1
Edinburgh City (loan)	2023–24	Scottish League One	9	1	0	0	—		0	0	9	1
Broughty Athletic (loan)	2023–24	Midlands League	12	0	—		—		1 (Note: Appearance(s) in the North-Tayside Inter Regional Cup)	0	13	0
Arbroath	2024–25	Scottish League One	36	1	1	0	4	0	1	0	42	1
Arbroath	2025–26	Scottish Championship	35	1	2	0	4	0	5 (Note: 3 appearances in the Scottish Challenge Cup, 2 appearance in the Scottish Premiership play-offs)	0	46	1
Arbroath	Total		71	2	3	0	8	0	6	0	88	2
Livingston	2026–27	Scottish Championship	3	0	0	0	3	0	0	0	6	0
Career total			151	7	5	0	14	0	19	4	188	11

== Honours ==
Arbroath

- Scottish League One: 2024–25

Individual

- Peterhead Young Player of the Year: 2022–23

== See also ==
- List of Scottish football families
