= Ziyad Larkeche =

French footballer (born 2002)

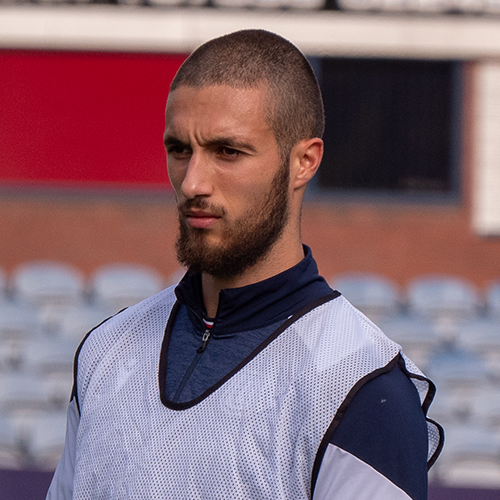
- Larkeche in 2024

Personal information
- Full name: Ziyad Larkeche
- Date of birth: 19 September 2002 (age 24)
- Place of birth: Paris, France
- Height: 1.82 m (6 ft 0 in)
- Position: Left-back

Team information
- Current team: Barnsley (on loan from Queens Park Rangers)
- Number: 3

Youth career
- 2011–2020: Paris Saint-Germain
- 2020–2022: Fulham

Senior career*
| Years | Team | Apps | (Gls) |
| 2022–2023 | Fulham | 0 | (0) |
| 2022–2023 | → Barnsley (loan) | 18 | (0) |
| 2023– | Queens Park Rangers | 20 | (0) |
| 2024–2025 | → Dundee (loan) | 27 | (3) |
| 2026– | → Barnsley (loan) | 7 | (0) |

International career
| 2021–2022 | France U20 | 6 | (0) |
- * Club domestic league appearances and goals as of 07:27, 21 November 2026 (UTC)

Ziyad Larkeche (born 19 September 2002) is a French professional footballer who plays as a left-back for EFL League One club Barnsley, on loan from EFL Championship club Queens Park Rangers.

== Club career ==
=== Early career ===
Born in Paris, Larkeche played youth football with Paris Saint-Germain and Fulham, before going on loan to Barnsley in September 2022. He made his senior debut on 20 September 2022 in the EFL Trophy, and was praised for his performance by assistant head coach Martin Paterson, after setting up one goal before later scoring a free kick. He was released by Fulham at the end of the 2022–23 season.

=== Queens Park Rangers ===
On 30 June 2023, Larkeche signed for Championship club Queens Park Rangers on a three-year deal.

On 30 July 2024, Larkeche joined Scottish Premiership club Dundee on a season-long loan deal. He made his first appearance for the club on 4 August in a league-opening Dundee derby away to Dundee United. Larkeche scored his first goal for the Dee on 31 August in a league game against St Mirren. Larkeche suffered a hamstring injury in November 2024, which kept him out until February 2025. After helping the Dee avoid relegation, Larkeche rejoined QPR at the end of the season.

On 29 August 2026, Larkeche signed for Barnsley on a season-long loan.

== International career ==
Born in France, Larkeche is of Algerian descent. He holds both French and Algerian nationalities. He is a French youth international, having played up to the France U20s.

== Career statistics ==
As of match played 20 November 2026

Appearances and goals by club, season and competition
| Club | Season | League | | | National cup (Note: Includes FA Cup, Scottish Cup) | | League cup (Note: Includes EFL Cup, Scottish League Cup) | | Other | | Total | |
| Club | Season | Division | Apps | Goals | Apps | Goals | Apps | Goals | Apps | Goals | Apps | Goals |
|---|---|---|---|---|---|---|---|---|---|---|---|---|
| Fulham | 2020–21 | Premier League | 0 | 0 | 0 | 0 | 0 | 0 | 1 (Note: Appearance(s) in the EFL Trophy.) | 0 | 1 | 0 |
| Fulham | 2021–22 | Championship | 0 | 0 | 0 | 0 | 0 | 0 | 0 | 0 | 0 | 0 |
| Fulham | 2022–23 | Premier League | 0 | 0 | 0 | 0 | 0 | 0 | 0 | 0 | 0 | 0 |
| Fulham | Total | | 0 | 0 | 0 | 0 | 0 | 0 | 1 | 0 | 1 | 0 |
| Barnsley (loan) | 2022–23 | League One | 18 | 0 | 2 | 0 | 0 | 0 | 3 | 1 | 23 | 1 |
| Queens Park Rangers | 2023–24 | Championship | 20 | 0 | 1 | 0 | 1 | 0 | 0 | 0 | 22 | 0 |
| Queens Park Rangers | 2024–25 | Championship | 0 | 0 | 0 | 0 | 0 | 0 | 0 | 0 | 0 | 0 |
| Queens Park Rangers | 2025–26 | Championship | 0 | 0 | 0 | 0 | 0 | 0 | 0 | 0 | 0 | 0 |
| Queens Park Rangers | 2026–27 | Championship | 0 | 0 | 0 | 0 | 0 | 0 | 0 | 0 | 0 | 0 |
| Queens Park Rangers | Total | | 20 | 0 | 1 | 0 | 1 | 0 | 0 | 0 | 22 | 0 |
| Dundee (loan) | 2024–25 | Scottish Premiership | 27 | 3 | 2 | 0 | 2 | 0 | 0 | 0 | 31 | 3 |
| Barnsley (loan) | 2026–27 | League One | 7 | 0 | 1 | 0 | 0 | 0 | 0 | 0 | 8 | 0 |
| Career total | | | 72 | 3 | 6 | 0 | 3 | 0 | 4 | 1 | 85 | 4 |
