= 2025–26 Dundee F.C. season =

Dundee
2025–26 season
- Chairman: Tim Keyes
- Head coach: Steven Pressley
- Stadium: Dens Park
- Scottish Premiership: 8th
- Scottish Cup: Fifth round
- League Cup: Group stage
- Top goalscorer: League: Simon Murray (7); All: Simon Murray (9)
- Highest home attendance: 11,010 vs. Dundee United, 15 March 2026 (Prem.)
- Lowest home attendance: 1,808 vs. Montrose, 26 July 2025 (League Cup GS)
- Average home league attendance: 7,194
| Home colours | Away colours |

The 2025–26 season was the 124th season in which Dundee competed at a Scottish national level, and the 101st season played in the highest division in the Scottish football league system. They played in the Scottish Premiership for the third consecutive season after finishing 10th in the previous campaign. Dundee also competed in the Scottish League Cup, exiting at the group stage, and in the Scottish Cup, exiting in the fifth round.

== Season summary ==
=== Pre-season ===
On 19 May 2025, the day following Dundee confirming their top flight status for the 2025–26 season, manager Tony Docherty and his entire backroom staff were relieved of their duties. Managerless Dundee announced their first friendly date on 30 May, an away trip to Gayfield Park to face Arbroath on 28 June. On 2 June, Dundee announced that Steven Pressley was the club's new head coach. Another friendly was announced on 4 June against Brechin City at Glebe Park.

Dundee played their first friendly on 28 June away to Arbroath, and beat the Lichties 0–2 amid very blustery conditions. They followed up the week after with another comfortable away win over Angus opposition in a win against Brechin City.

=== July ===
Dundee started off their competitive season at Dens against Championship side Airdrieonians, and were beaten and left scoreless in an ominous display to mark Pressley's return to management. Things managed to get even worse the following week with another goalless defeat against lower league opposition as League One side Alloa Athletic all but knocked Pressley's discordant Dees out of the tournament in the middle of July. In the midweek, Pressley got his first win as two late headers gave Dundee an away win over Lowland League club Bonnyrigg Rose. In a dead rubber at home to Montrose to finish the group stage, the Dee managed a late flurry of goals to end with a comfortable 5–0 victory.

=== August ===
Dundee began their Premiership campaign by welcoming Hibernian to Dens Park, and fell to a defeat as two quickfire first-half goals from Hibs striker Kieron Bowie proved too much for Pressley's side to come back from. Things improved dramatically the following week against a Rangers side fresh off playing well in the UEFA Champions League qualifiers, with a late controversial penalty denying the Dee a first win at Ibrox since 2001 but still leaving them with a valuable first point of the season. Dundee were again on the road two weeks later, and played out an acceptable goalless draw with Kilmarnock at Rugby Park. The last match before the September international break saw the first Dundee derby of the season, with Pressley's Dee finding themselves outmatched by Dundee United in another flat and disappointing defeat at home.

=== September ===
After a two week hiatus, Pressley's side started the first half terribly against Motherwell in the same passive manner, but an improved second half thanks to substitute Cameron Congreve and good saves from keeper Jon McCracken managed to earn Dundee a point despite a late sending off for Yan Dhanda. The next week saw the Dee grab their first league win of the season in dramatic fashion, with a positive performance for most of the game through two more assists from Congreve almost being wasted with two poor late goals conceded, only for a stoppage-time penalty to be netted by Callum Jones to send Dundee up to 5th place for the time being. Pressley's side could not keep the momentum going, losing by a single goal to St Mirren in Paisley.

=== October ===
Next up for the Dee was a trip to Pittodrie to face an Aberdeen side at the bottom of the table having not scored once in the league yet and coming off a tiring defeat in the UEFA Conference League a few nights prior. Naturally, Pressley's side were blown away in the first half by three easy goals en route to another embarrassing defeat. After an international break however, Dundee returned with a bang in a pretty comfortable win over reigning champions Celtic, marking their first win over the side since May 2001 and their first win over Celtic at Dens Park since September 1988. Despite looking to continue some momentum with a first half lead, again via the head of Clark Robertson, at a sold-out Falkirk Stadium the following week, Dundee gave it all away with a late Falkirk goal to once again land themselves near the bottom.

=== November ===
November begin with a trip to Edinburgh was up next against league-leading and unbeaten Hearts, and Pressley's side were easily brushed aside in another heavy defeat away from home. Returning to Dens on Remembrance Sunday, another lame defeat ensued as Rangers scored two early goals and left Dundee scoreless for the 6th time in 12 league games. After the final international break of the year Dundee returned to Edinburgh and made it 7 scoreless games in 13 with another meek defeat, this time to Hibernian after conceding a goal in both halves. After an early self-made setback at home to St Mirren, Dundee finally turned the tables around and ran out 3–1 victors, ending their 4-game losing streak and jumping above the Buddies and Kilmarnock to move to 9th place for the time being.

=== December ===
In a mid-week trip to Celtic Park, Dundee put in a dogged display that had the home fans nervous at the end but in the end had to face a narrow defeat. Three days later, the Dee failed to make a comeback at home to Aberdeen and returned to 2nd bottom with another defeat ahead of a bottom two six-pointer away to Livingston the following week. At Almondvale, Dundee got off to a flier with two early goals but Pressley's side again capitulated to leave with just a point, though it was enough to temporarily lift them up to 10th place. A drab and low-quality affair took place the following week at Fir Park, but hosts Motherwell managed to find a goal late on to keep their momentum going while Dundee again fell to a scoreless defeat. At the midway point of their league season, Dundee turned the tables on Falkirk with a late first half penalty scored by Yan Dhanda and a rare clean sheet despite a Simon Murray red card to win their first game in 5 games and increase their distance from the bottom two. In the last game of 2025, Dundee put in a dominant performance in a comeback win in a big six-pointer at home to Kilmarnock, earning their first consecutive wins in 20 months and lifting them up to 9th place to end the year.

=== January ===
Dundee started 2026 with a bang, crossing the road to Tannadice Park and defeating their Dundee derby rivals Dundee United through a clean sheet and an Ashley Hay goal to earn their third consecutive win in a row (the first time for them in the top flight since November 2014) and their 3rd win over United in the last 12 months. The following week, the Dee couldn't take advantage of league-leading Hearts playing with a man down for the entire second half and slumped to a disappointing defeat. The Dark Blues recovered and made it 4 wins out of 5 with a comeback win over Kilmarnock at Rugby Park in the Scottish Cup to progress into the fifth round. A return to league action saw a loss to Rangers at Ibrox. Dundee ended the month with a dull and disappointing draw in Paisley against ten-man St Mirren, the third time in four games where the Dee ended the game with a man advantage.

=== February ===
After a January of unprecedented rainfall in the north-east of Scotland, Dundee's first game of February at home to Motherwell was postponed due to a waterlogged Dens Park. Changing focus to the Scottish Cup, Dundee discovered a new method of heartbreak in the competition by a Celtic equaliser with the very last kick of regular time stopping a momentous win at Celtic Park before losing in extra time to be dumped out of the cup. Returning to league action in the midweek, Dundee travelled to Falkirk Stadium and were once again blanked by the hosts in a defeat. The Dark Blues hosted bottom side Livingston on Valentine's Day in a game with a manic first half - with two Simon Murray goals in the first 5 minutes and conceding the lead within 15 further minutes due in part to a mistake from keeper Jon McCracken - was followed by a frustrating second half that left Dundee with a point and a third straight game against Livi having lost a two-goal lead. A week later, Dundee recovered from a rough start away to Aberdeen and earned their first win at Pittodrie Stadium since May 2004 through a late screamer from Ethan Hamilton which provided 3 precious points. Returning to Dens to face Hibs to end the month proved to be an entertaining affair, with Dundee taking the lead, before going behind only to equalise with the last kick of the game to grab a deserved point, all in the last 20 minutes.

=== March ===
Dundee kept their fine form going heading into March, topping title hopefuls Motherwell at Dens in a win that halted the visitors' 9-game unbeaten streak in the league, lifting the Dee above Aberdeen and two points behind Dundee United a week ahead of the Dundee derby. In another frenetic derby against their foes across the street, Dundee looked lost and beaten going into stoppage time 2 goals down before an Ashley Hay tap-in and a calamitous own goal allowed the Dark Blues to steal an improbable point off of Dundee United and extend their unbeaten streak to 5 games. A tight game away to league-leading Hearts was decided late on by a goal from the hosts, while Dundee's rivals below them picked up wins to increase pressure on them as they entered the last international break of the season.

=== April ===
After two weeks off, Dundee played host to Celtic and kept it tight until the last ten minutes when a late goal for the visitors and a red card condemned the Dee to defeat. In the last game before the split, the Dark Blues came from behind twice in a 'must-not-lose' game at Rugby Park to get a valuable draw against relegation rivals Kilmarnock, but missed a last-minute penalty after a ridiculously lengthy VAR check to miss out on a potentially vital win. In their first post-split fixture, Dundee made the short walk to Tannadice Park and received a heavy defeat from their local rivals.

=== May ===
In a massive six-pointer in the dogfight to stay out of the Premiership play-offs, Dundee took a massive three points at home to St Mirren thanks to an early Joe Westley goal and a gritty defensive display to distance themselves from 11th place. A week later, Dundee secured their safety and Scottish Premiership status with a commanding win over an already-relegated Livingston. With Dundee being mathematically safe, Pressley heavily rotated the squad ahead of their last game of the season – the fourth such trip to Rugby Park during the campaign – and conceded two late goals to lose to a motivated Kilmarnock side. In the final game of the season at home to Aberdeen, a back-and-forth contest ended with a Dundee win after a late Ryan Astley header sealed it, leapfrogging the Dee over the Dons and securing an 8th place finish.

== Competitions ==
Win Draw Loss Postponed

All times are in British Summer Time (BST).

=== Pre-season and friendlies ===
| 28 June 2025 Friendly | Arbroath | 0–2 | Dundee | Gayfield Park, Arbroath |
| 15:00 | | Report | D. Wright 48'; McDermott (trialist) 68' | Attendance: 2,425; Referee: Jamie McCunnie |

| 5 July 2025 Friendly | Brechin City | 0–3 | Dundee | Glebe Park, Brechin |
| 15:00 | | Report | Murray 2' (pen.); Acquah 17'; Urías (trialist) 86' | Referee: Stewart Luke |

| 8 October 2025 Graham Webster testimonial | Montrose | 0–2 | Dundee | Links Park, Montrose |
| 19:45 | | Report | Reilly 23'; Crombie 64' |

=== Scottish Premiership ===
Dundee will play against Aberdeen, Celtic, Dundee United, Falkirk, Heart of Midlothian, Hibernian, Kilmarnock, Livingston, Motherwell, Rangers and St Mirren in the 2025–26 Premiership campaign. They will play each team three times, twice at home and once away against half of the teams, and once at home and twice away against the other half. Following this, they will be split into either a top or bottom group of six depending on their position after 33 games, where they will play each team in their group once. The post-split fixtures were announced on 7 April 2026.

| 3 August 2025 1 | Dundee | 1–2 | Hibernian | Dens Park, Dundee |
| 15:00 | F. Robertson 36' | Report | Bowie 28', 31' | Attendance: 7,825; Referee: David Dickinson |

| 9 August 2025 2 | Rangers | 1–1 | Dundee | Ibrox Stadium, Glasgow |
| 17:45 | Djiga (red card) 59'; Tavernier 90+2' (pen.) | Report | Astley 51' | Attendance: 48,958; Referee: Don Robertson |

| 23 August 2025 3 | Kilmarnock | 0–0 | Dundee | Rugby Park, Kilmarnock |
| 15:00 | | Report | | Attendance: 5,670; Referee: Ryan Lee |

| 31 August 2025 4 | Dundee | 0–2 | Dundee United | Dens Park, Dundee |
| 14:00 | | Report | Sapsford 14'; Dolček 77' | Attendance: 10,750; Referee: Steven McLean |

| 13 September 2025 5 | Dundee | 1–1 | Motherwell | Dens Park, Dundee |
| 15:00 | Graham 48'; Dhanda (red card) 85' | Report | Maswanhise 33' | Attendance: 4,572; Referee: Calum Scott |

| 20 September 2025 6* | Dundee | 3–2 | Livingston | Dens Park, Dundee |
| 15:00 | Murray 43'; Westley 66'; Jones 90+7' (pen.) | Report | C. Robertson 74' (o.g.); Bokila 83' (pen.) | Attendance: 5,018; Referee: Ross Hardie |
Note: Game was brought forward with the agreement of both clubs. Original date was 29 October 2025.

| 27 September 2025 7 | St Mirren | 1–0 | Dundee | St Mirren Park, Paisley |
| 15:00 | Phillips 39' | Report | | Attendance: 6,382; Referee: Matthew MacDermid |

| 5 October 2025 8 | Aberdeen | 4–0 | Dundee | Pittodrie Stadium, Aberdeen |
| 15:00 | Karlsson 22' (pen.), 63'; Aouchiche 30'; Gyamfi 33' | Report | | Attendance: 16,525; Referee: Don Robertson |

| 19 October 2025 9 | Dundee | 2–0 | Celtic | Dens Park, Dundee |
| 12:00 | C. Robertson 18'; Carter-Vickers 45+1' (o.g.) | Report | | Attendance: 8,318; Referee: Matthew MacDermid |

| 25 October 2025 10 | Falkirk | 2–1 | Dundee | Falkirk Stadium, Falkirk |
| 15:00 | C. Robertson 55' (o.g.); Allan 89' | Report | C. Robertson 26' | Attendance: 7,652; Referee: Ross Hardie |

| 1 November 2025 11 | Heart of Midlothian | 4–0 | Dundee | Tynecastle Park, Edinburgh |
| 15:00 | Shankland 31'; Kaboré 38', 56'; Magnússon 79' | Report | | Attendance: 18,767; Referee: Kevin Clancy |

| 9 November 2025 12 | Dundee | 0–3 | Rangers | Dens Park, Dundee |
| 15:00 | | Report | Raskin 9'; Moore 14'; Gassama 90' | Attendance: 8,562; Referee: Matthew MacDermid |

| 22 November 2025 13 | Hibernian | 2–0 | Dundee | Easter Road, Edinburgh |
| 15:00 | Bowie 30'; McGrath 59' | Report | | Attendance: 17,714; Referee: Steven McLean |

| 29 November 2025 14 | Dundee | 3–1 | St Mirren | Dens Park, Dundee |
| 15:00 | Gogić 29' (o.g.); D. Wright 39'; Westley 87' | Report | Mandron 27' | Attendance: 4,782; Referee: John Beaton |

| 3 December 2025 15 | Celtic | 1–0 | Dundee | Celtic Park, Glasgow |
| 19:45 | Maeda 11' | Report | | Attendance: 57,302; Referee: Duncan Nicolson |

| 6 December 2025 16 | Dundee | 1–3 | Aberdeen | Dens Park, Dundee |
| 15:00 | Astley 60' | Report | Aouchiche 17', 30'; Nisbet 90+2' | Attendance: 7,402; Referee: Grant Irvine |

| 13 December 2025 17 | Livingston | 2–2 | Dundee | Almondvale Stadium, Livingston |
| 15:00 | Bokila 64'; Yengi 85'; McGowan (red card) 90+6' | Report | Dhanda 13'; Congreve 18' | Attendance: 3,094; Referee: Dan McFarlane |

| 20 December 2025 18 | Motherwell | 1–0 | Dundee | Fir Park, Motherwell |
| 15:00 | Slattery 82' | Report | | Attendance: 6,649; Referee: Matthew MacDermid |

| 27 December 2025 19 | Dundee | 1–0 | Falkirk | Dens Park, Dundee |
| 15:00 | Dhanda 45+5' (pen.); Murray (red card) 87' | Report | | Attendance: 6,798; Referee: Duncan Nicolson |

| 30 December 2025 20 | Dundee | 2–1 | Kilmarnock | Dens Park, Dundee |
| 19:45 | Hay 57'; Reilly 72' | Report | Kiltie 38' | Attendance: 5,039; Referee: Nick Walsh |

| 3 January 2026 21 | Dundee United | 0–1 | Dundee | Tannadice Park, Dundee |
| 15:00 | | Report | Hay 45' | Attendance: 13,495; Referee: Don Robertson |

| 11 January 2025 22 | Dundee | 0–1 | Heart of Midlothian | Dens Park, Dundee |
| 14:00 | | Report | Braga 27'; Schwolow (red card) 45+5' | Attendance: 8,525; Referee: Ryan Lee |

| 25 January 2025 23 | Rangers | 3–0 | Dundee | Ibrox Stadium, Glasgow |
| 15:00 | Tavernier 48' (pen.); Danilo 90+1'; Gassama 90+4' | Report | | Attendance: 50,165; Referee: Kevin Clancy |

| 31 January 2026 24 | St Mirren | 0–0 | Dundee | St Mirren Park, Paisley |
| 15:00 | Young (red card) 63' | Report | | Attendance: 6,461; Referee: Nick Walsh |

| 11 February 2026 25 | Falkirk | 1–0 | Dundee | Falkirk Stadium, Falkirk |
| 19:45 | Broggio 55' | Report | | Attendance: 7,345; Referee: David Dickinson |

| 14 February 2026 26 | Dundee | 2–2 | Livingston | Dens Park, Dundee |
| 15:00 | Murray 3', 5' | Report | L. Smith 15'; Pittman 19' | Attendance: 6,032; Referee: Nick Walsh |

| 21 February 2026 27 | Aberdeen | 2–3 | Dundee | Pittodrie Stadium, Aberdeen |
| 15:00 | Nisbet 13', 68'; Morrison (red card) 39' | Report | Murray 40' (pen.); Cotterill 45+1'; Hamilton 84' | Attendance: 17,327; Referee: Steven McLean |

| 28 February 2026 28 | Dundee | 3–3 | Hibernian | Dens Park, Dundee |
| 15:00 | Murray 15'; Graham 72'; Congreve 90+5' | Report | Elding 11'; Šuto 84'; McGrath 89' | Attendance: 7,512; Referee: Ross Hardie |

| 7 March 2026 29* | Dundee | 2–1 | Motherwell | Dens Park, Dundee |
| 15:00 | Yogane 32'; F. Robertson 84' | Report | Slattery 78' | Attendance: 6,304; Referee: Dan McFarlane |
Note: *Initially postponed and rescheduled due to a waterlogged pitch. Original date was 4 February 2026.

| 15 March 2026 30 | Dundee | 2–2 | Dundee United | Dens Park, Dundee |
| 14:00 | Hay 90+4'; R. Graham 90+6' (o.g.) | Report | Fatah 50' (pen.); Stephenson 66' | Attendance: 11,010; Referee: Duncan Nicolson |

| 21 March 2026 31 | Heart of Midlothian | 1–0 | Dundee | Tynecastle Park, Edinburgh |
| 15:00 | McEntee 77'; Kent (red card) 90+1' | Report | | Attendance: 18,827; Referee: Don Robertson |

| 5 April 2026 32 | Dundee | 1–2 | Celtic | Dens Park, Dundee |
| 16:30 | Murray 57' (pen.); Astley (red card) 84' | Report | Yang 9'; Iheanacho 82' | Attendance: 9,007; Referee: Steven McLean |

| 11 April 2026 33 | Kilmarnock | 2–2 | Dundee | Rugby Park, Kilmarnock |
| 15:00 | Hugill 14'; Schjønning-Larsen 33' | Report | Murray 24'; S. Wright 81' | Attendance: 6,435; Referee: Ross Hardie |

| 26 April 2026 34 | Dundee United | 3–0 | Dundee | Tannadice Park, Dundee |
| 14:00 | Ferry 14', 70'; Strain 72' | Report | | Attendance: 13,207; Referee: Matthew MacDermid |

| 2 May 2026 35 | Dundee | 1–0 | St Mirren | Dens Park, Dundee |
| 15:00 | Westley 12' | Report | | Attendance: 5,379; Referee: Steven McLean |

| 9 May 2026 36 | Dundee | 3–0 | Livingston | Dens Park, Dundee |
| 15:00 | Congreve 13'; F. Robertson 71'; Hay 83' | Report | | Attendance: 5,573; Referee: Colin Steven |

| 12 May 2026 37 | Kilmarnock | 3–1 | Dundee | Rugby Park, Kilmarnock |
| 19:45 | Lowery 62'; Hugill 85' (pen.), 90+4' | Report | Lowery 77' (o.g.) | Attendance: 5,839; Referee: Calum Scott |

| 17 May 2026 38 | Dundee | 3–2 | Aberdeen | Dens Park, Dundee |
| 14:00 | D. Wright 10'; Westley 61'; Astley 90' | Report | Morrison 23'; Olusanya 45+6' | Attendance: 8,279; Referee: Ross Hardie |

==== League table ====
| Pos | Team | Pld | W | D | L | GF | GA | GD | Pts | Qualification or relegation (Note: Teams played each other three times (33 matches), before the league was split into two groups (the top six and the bottom six).) |
|---|---|---|---|---|---|---|---|---|---|---|
| 6 | Falkirk | 38 | 14 | 7 | 17 | 50 | 62 | −12 | 49 | |
| 7 | Dundee United | 38 | 10 | 15 | 13 | 49 | 60 | −11 | 45 | |
| 8 | Dundee | 38 | 11 | 9 | 18 | 42 | 61 | −19 | 42 | |
| 9 | Aberdeen | 38 | 11 | 7 | 20 | 40 | 55 | −15 | 40 | |
| 10 | Kilmarnock | 38 | 10 | 10 | 18 | 50 | 68 | −18 | 40 | |

Rules for classification: 1) Points; 2) Goal difference; 3) Goals scored; 4) Head-to-head points; 5) Head-to-head goal difference; 6) Play-off (only if deciding champion, UEFA competition qualification, second stage group allocation, or relegation).

==== Results by round ====
| Round | 1 | 2 | 3 | 4 | 5 | 6 | 7 | 8 | 9 | 10 | 11 | 12 | 13 | 14 | 15 | 16 | 17 | 18 | 19 | 20 | 21 | 22 | 23 | 24 | 25 | 26 | 27 | 28 | 29 | 30 | 31 | 32 | 33 | 34 | 35 | 36 | 37 | 38 |
|---|---|---|---|---|---|---|---|---|---|---|---|---|---|---|---|---|---|---|---|---|---|---|---|---|---|---|---|---|---|---|---|---|---|---|---|---|---|---|
| Ground | H | A | A | H | H | H | A | A | H | A | A | H | A | H | A | H | A | A | H | H | A | H | A | A | A | H | A | H | H | H | A | H | A | A | H | H | A | H |
| Result | L | D | D | L | D | W | L | L | W | L | L | L | L | W | L | L | D | L | W | W | W | L | L | D | L | D | W | D | W | D | L | L | D | L | W | W | L | W |
| Position | 10 | 9 | 8 | 11 | 11 | 5 | 9 | 11 | 9 | 10 | 11 | 11 | 11 | 9 | 10 | 11 | 10 | 10 | 10 | 9 | 9 | 9 | 9 | 9 | 10 | 9 | 9 | 9 | 8 | 8 | 8 | 8 | 9 | 9 | 9 | 9 | 9 | 8 |

Source: Competitive matches
A = Away; H = Home; W = Win; D = Draw; L = Loss

=== Scottish Cup ===
Dundee will compete in the Scottish Cup and will enter the competition in the 4th round. The draw for the round was made on 30 November 2025, broadcast live on BBC Scotland via Sportscene.

| 17 January 2025 Fourth round | Kilmarnock | 1–2 | Dundee | Rugby Park, Kilmarnock |
| 15:00 | Thompson 11'; Thomson (red card) 80'; Mayo (red card) 90+3' | Report | Hay 69'; D. Wright 90+1' | Attendance: 4,501; Referee: Colin Steven |

| 7 February 2026 Fifth round | Celtic | 2–1 (a.e.t.) | Dundee | Celtic Park, Glasgow |
| 17:30 | Adamu 90+7'; Tounekti 92' | Report | Hamilton 49' | Attendance: 36,673; Referee: Ryan Lee |

=== Scottish League Cup ===
Dundee will compete in the Scottish League Cup and will enter the competition in the group stage. The draw for the group stage was held on 28 May 2025 at 13:00, broadcast live on Premier Sports. Dundee was drawn into Group C with Airdrieonians, Alloa Athletic, Montrose and Bonnyrigg Rose.

==== Group stage ====
| 12 July 2025 1 | Dundee | 0–1 | Airdrieonians | Dens Park, Dundee |
| 15:00 | | Report | Mochrie 22' | Attendance: 2,306; Referee: David Dickinson |

| 19 July 2025 2 | Alloa Athletic | 1–0 | Dundee | Recreation Park, Alloa |
| 15:00 | Graham 68' (o.g.) | Report | | Attendance: 786; Referee: Don Robertson |

| 22 July 2025 3 | Bonnyrigg Rose | 1–3 | Dundee | Ferguson Park, Rosewell (Note: Relocated due to pitch work at New Dundas Park.) |
| 19:45 | Ross 36' | Report | C. Robertson 20'; Acquah 86'; Koumetio 89' | Attendance: 853; Referee: Peter Stuart |

| 26 July 2025 4 | Dundee | 5–0 | Montrose | Dens Park, Dundee |
| 15:00 | Murray 3' (pen.), 47'; C. Robertson 81'; Astley 85'; Graham 88' | Report | | Attendance: 1,808; Referee: Duncan Nicolson |

==== Group C table ====
| Pos | Team | Pld | W | PW | PL | L | GF | GA | GD | Pts | Qualification | ALL | AIR | DND | MON | BON |
|---|---|---|---|---|---|---|---|---|---|---|---|---|---|---|---|---|
| 1 | Alloa Athletic | 4 | 4 | 0 | 0 | 0 | 7 | 3 | +4 | 12 | Qualification for the second round | — | — | 1–0 | 2–1 | — |
| 2 | Airdrieonians | 4 | 3 | 0 | 0 | 1 | 8 | 4 | +4 | 9 | | 2–3 | — | — | — | 3–0 |
| 3 | Dundee | 4 | 2 | 0 | 0 | 2 | 8 | 3 | +5 | 6 | | — | 0–1 | — | 5–0 | — |
| 4 | Montrose | 4 | 1 | 0 | 0 | 3 | 6 | 10 | −4 | 3 | | — | 1–2 | — | — | 4–1 |
| 5 | Bonnyrigg Rose | 4 | 0 | 0 | 0 | 4 | 2 | 11 | −9 | 0 | | 0–1 | — | 1–3 | — | — |

Rules for classification: 1) goal difference, 2) goals scored, 3) away goals scored, 4) matches won, 5) away matches won, 6) drawing of lots.

== Squad statistics ==
As of 17 May 2026

| No. | Pos | Nat | Player | Total | | Premiership | | Scottish Cup | | League Cup | |
| No. | Pos | Nat | Player | Apps | Goals | Apps | Goals | Apps | Goals | Apps | Goals |
|---|---|---|---|---|---|---|---|---|---|---|---|
| 1 | GK | (Scotland) SCO | Jon McCracken | 39 | 0 | 35 | 0 | 2 | 0 | 2 | 0 |
| 3 | DF | (Scotland) SCO | Clark Robertson | 18 | 4 | 15 | 2 | 0+1 | 0 | 2 | 2 |
| 4 | DF | (Wales) WAL | Ryan Astley | 41 | 4 | 34+2 | 3 | 2 | 0 | 2+1 | 1 |
| 5 | DF | (France) FRA | Billy Koumetio | 24 | 1 | 13+8 | 0 | 1 | 0 | 2 | 1 |
| 6 | DF | (Northern Ireland) NIR | Aaron Donnelly | 3 | 0 | 0+2 | 0 | 0 | 0 | 1 | 0 |
| 7 | MF | (England) ENG | Drey Wright | 41 | 3 | 34+1 | 2 | 2 | 1 | 3+1 | 0 |
| 8 | MF | (England) ENG | Paul Digby | 18 | 0 | 8+6 | 0 | 0 | 0 | 3+1 | 0 |
| 10 | MF | (Scotland) SCO | Finlay Robertson | 30 | 3 | 14+11 | 3 | 0+1 | 0 | 3+1 | 0 |
| 11 | FW | (England) ENG | Ashley Hay | 34 | 5 | 12+17 | 4 | 1 | 1 | 1+3 | 0 |
| 12 | DF | (England) ENG | Imari Samuels | 39 | 0 | 21+12 | 0 | 0+2 | 0 | 2+2 | 0 |
| 13 | GK | (Republic of Ireland) IRL | Kieran O'Hara | 4 | 0 | 3+1 | 0 | 0 | 0 | 0 | 0 |
| 14 | DF | (Netherlands) NED | Lewis Montsma | 0 | 0 | 0 | 0 | 0 | 0 | 0 | 0 |
| 15 | FW | (Scotland) SCO | Simon Murray | 38 | 9 | 24+8 | 7 | 1+1 | 0 | 4 | 2 |
| 16 | DF | (England) ENG | Brad Halliday | 11 | 0 | 9+1 | 0 | 1 | 0 | 0 | 0 |
| 17 | MF | (England) ENG | Tony Yogane | 42 | 1 | 25+11 | 1 | 2 | 0 | 3+1 | 0 |
| 18 | MF | (Scotland) SCO | Charlie Reilly | 23 | 1 | 2+19 | 1 | 0+2 | 0 | 0 | 0 |
| 19 | FW | (England) ENG | Joe Westley | 23 | 4 | 18+5 | 4 | 0 | 0 | 0 | 0 |
| 20 | MF | (Wales) WAL | Cameron Congreve | 36 | 3 | 31+3 | 3 | 2 | 0 | 0 | 0 |
| 21 | MF | (England) ENG | Yan Dhanda | 30 | 2 | 26+2 | 2 | 2 | 0 | 0 | 0 |
| 22 | DF | (Scotland) SCO | Luke Graham | 41 | 3 | 35+1 | 2 | 2 | 0 | 3 | 1 |
| 24 | MF | (Wales) WAL | Joel Cotterill | 14 | 1 | 9+4 | 1 | 1 | 0 | 0 | 0 |
| 25 | MF | (Scotland) SCO | Scott Wright | 10 | 1 | 2+7 | 1 | 0+1 | 0 | 0 | 0 |
| 27 | FW | (Scotland) SCO | Joe Bevan | 6 | 0 | 0+5 | 0 | 0+1 | 0 | 0 | 0 |
| 28 | MF | (Wales) WAL | Callum Jones | 31 | 1 | 12+15 | 1 | 1+1 | 0 | 1+1 | 0 |
| 30 | GK | (Scotland) SCO | Harrison Sharp | 0 | 0 | 0 | 0 | 0 | 0 | 0 | 0 |
| 38 | FW | (Mexico) MEX | Aldahir Valenzuela | 1 | 0 | 0+1 | 0 | 0 | 0 | 0 | 0 |
| 48 | MF | (Scotland) SCO | Ethan Hamilton | 35 | 2 | 33 | 1 | 2 | 1 | 0 | 0 |
| 52 | DF | (Scotland) SCO | Charley Oosenbrugh | 1 | 0 | 0+1 | 0 | 0 | 0 | 0 | 0 |
Players away from the club on loan:
| 2 | DF | (England) ENG | Ethan Ingram | 8 | 0 | 1+2 | 0 | 0+1 | 0 | 2+2 | 0 |
| 9 | FW | (England) ENG | Emile Acquah | 17 | 1 | 2+11 | 0 | 0 | 0 | 3+1 | 1 |
| 31 | GK | (Northern Ireland) NIR | Trevor Carson | 2 | 0 | 0 | 0 | 0 | 0 | 2 | 0 |
| 40 | MF | (Scotland) SCO | Finlay Allan | 0 | 0 | 0 | 0 | 0 | 0 | 0 | 0 |
| 58 | MF | (Scotland) SCO | Ethan Crombie | 0 | 0 | 0 | 0 | 0 | 0 | 0 | 0 |
Players who left the club during the season:
| 14 | MF | (Mexico) MEX | César Garza | 5 | 0 | 0+2 | 0 | 0 | 0 | 3 | 0 |
| 25 | DF | (Bulgaria) BUL | Plamen Galabov | 2 | 0 | 0 | 0 | 0 | 0 | 2 | 0 |
| 27 | MF | (Mexico) MEX | Víctor López | 1 | 0 | 0 | 0 | 0 | 0 | 0+1 | 0 |

== Transfers ==
=== Summer ===
==== Players in ====
| Date | Player | From | Fee |
|---|---|---|---|
| 12 June 2025 | (England) Paul Digby | (England) Cambridge United | Free |
| 12 June 2025 | (England) Drey Wright | (Scotland) St Johnstone | Free |
| 23 June 2025 | (England) Emile Acquah | (England) Barrow | Undisclosed |
| 27 June 2025 | (Bulgaria) Plamen Galabov | (Israel) Maccabi Petah Tikva | Free |
| 30 June 2025 | (England) Tony Yogane | (England) Brentford | Loan |
| 4 July 2025 | (England) Ashley Hay | (England) Brentford | Free |
| 15 July 2025 | (Wales) Callum Jones | (England) Hull City | Free |
| 5 August 2025 | (England) Joe Westley | (England) Burnley | Undisclosed |
| 8 August 2025 | (England) Yan Dhanda | (Scotland) Heart of Midlothian | Loan |
| 22 August 2025 | (Wales) Cameron Congreve | (Wales) Swansea City | Loan |
| 26 August 2025 | (Scotland) Ethan Hamilton | (England) Lincoln City | Undisclosed |

==== Players out ====
| Date | Player | To | Fee |
|---|---|---|---|
| 22 August 2025 | (Mexico) Víctor López | (Mexico) Querétaro | End of loan |
| 29 August 2025 | (Scotland) Finlay Allan | (Scotland) Brechin City | Loan |

=== Winter ===
==== Players in ====
| Date | Player | From | Fee |
|---|---|---|---|
| 16 September 2025 | (Republic of Ireland) Kieran O'Hara | (Scotland) Kilmarnock | Free |
| 2 January 2026 | (Scotland) Joe Bevan | (England) Burnley | Terms agreed |
| 14 January 2026 | (England) Brad Halliday | (England) Bradford City | Terms agreed |
| 14 January 2026 | (Wales) Joel Cotterill | (Wales) Swansea City | Loan |
| 2 February 2026 | (Netherlands) Lewis Montsma | (England) Lincoln City | Undisclosed |
| 2 February 2026 | (Scotland) Scott Wright | (England) Birmingham City | Loan |
| 2 February 2026 | (Mexico) Aldahir Valenzuela | (Mexico) Monterrey | Loan |
| 9 May 2026 | (Scotland) Harrison Sharp | (Scotland) Montrose | Return from loan (Note: Granted special dispensation from SFA to return from Montrose loan after Jon McCracken's injury.) |

==== Players out ====
| Date | Player | To | Fee |
|---|---|---|---|
| 25 September 2025 | (Northern Ireland) Trevor Carson | (Scotland) Ross County | Loan |
| 23 October 2025 | (Scotland) Harrison Sharp | (Scotland) Montrose | Emergency loan |
| 7 November 2025 | (Scotland) Ethan Crombie | (Scotland) Brechin City | Loan |
| 10 December 2025 | (Mexico) César Garza | (Mexico) Monterrey | Loan ended |
| 5 January 2026 | (Scotland) Harrison Sharp | (Scotland) Montrose | Loan |
| 13 January 2026 | (England) Emile Acquah | (England) Harrogate Town | Loan |
| 18 January 2026 | (Bulgaria) Plamen Galabov | (Kazakhstan) Kyzylzhar | Mutual consent |
| 27 February 2026 | (England) Ethan Ingram | (Scotland) Partick Thistle | Loan |

=== End of season ===
==== New deals and extensions ====
| Date | Player | Until |
|---|---|---|
| 11 May 2026 | (Republic of Ireland) Kieran O'Hara | May 2028 |
| 14 May 2026 | (Wales) Ryan Astley | May 2029 |
| 20 May 2026 | (France) Billy Koumetio | May 2027 |
| 25 May 2026 | (Scotland) Charlie Reilly | May 2027 |
| 5 June 2026 | (Scotland) Finlay Robertson | May 2028 |

==== Players out ====
| Date | Player | To | Fee |
|---|---|---|---|
| 1 June 2026 | (England) Tony Yogane | (England) Brentford | Loan ended |
| 1 June 2026 | (Wales) Cameron Congreve | (Wales) Swansea City | Loan ended |
| 1 June 2026 | (England) Yan Dhanda | (Scotland) Heart of Midlothian | Loan ended |
| 1 June 2026 | (Wales) Joel Cotterill | (Wales) Swansea City | Loan ended |
| 1 June 2026 | (Scotland) Scott Wright | (England) Birmingham City | Loan ended |
| 1 June 2026 | (Mexico) Aldahir Valenzuela | (Mexico) Monterrey | Loan ended |
| 1 June 2026 | (Scotland) Jon McCracken | (England) Bradford City | End of contract |
| 1 June 2026 | (Netherlands) Lewis Montsma | Free agent | End of contract |
| 1 June 2026 | (England) Ethan Ingram | (Scotland) Partick Thistle | End of contract |
| 1 June 2026 | (Northern Ireland) Trevor Carson | (Scotland) Queen of the South | End of contract |
| 11 July 2026 | (Scotland) Clark Robertson | (Brunei) DPMM | End of contract |

== End of season awards ==
=== Club awards ===
- Andrew De Vries Player of the Year: Ethan Hamilton
- Isobel Sneddon Young Player of the Year: Luke Graham
- Players' Player of the Year: Luke Graham

== See also ==
- List of Dundee F.C. seasons
