= Tony Yogane =

English footballer (born 2005)

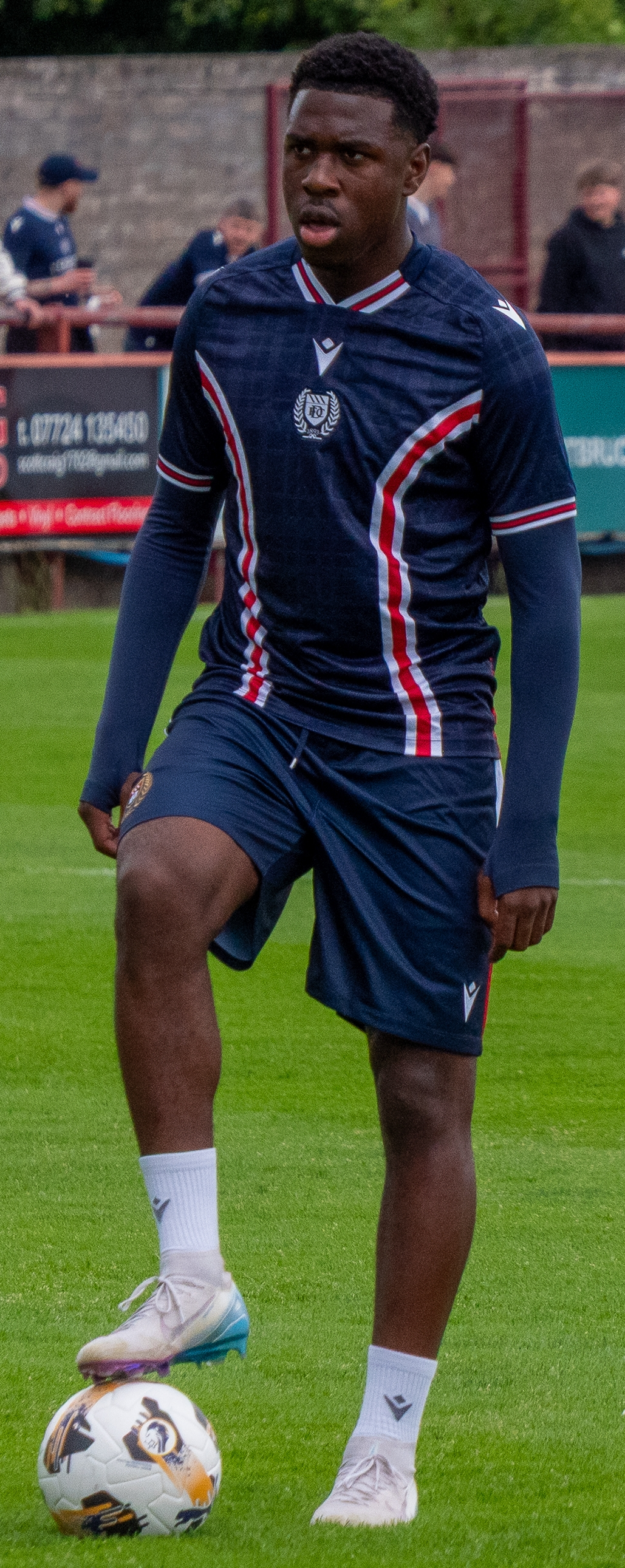
- Yogane warming up for Dundee in 2025

Personal information
- Full name: Tony Lauren Yogane
- Date of birth: 24 September 2005 (age 21)
- Place of birth: Croydon, England
- Height: 1.78 m (5 ft 10 in)
- Position: Left winger

Team information
- Current team: Aberdeen
- Number: 7

Youth career
- –2022: Sheffield Wednesday
- 2022–2024: Brentford

Senior career*
Years	Team	Apps	(Gls)
2024–2026	Brentford	0	(0)
2025	→ Exeter City (loan)	18	(0)
2025–2026	→ Dundee (loan)	36	(1)
2026–	Aberdeen	4	(0)
- * Club domestic league appearances and goals as of 17:00, 5 September 2026 (UTC)

Tony Lauren Yogane (born 24 September 2005) is an English professional footballer who plays as a left winger for Scottish Premiership club Aberdeen.

Yogane is a product of the Sheffield Wednesday Academy and began his professional career with Brentford B in 2022. After gaining his first senior experience away on loan, he transferred to Aberdeen in 2026.

== Career ==
=== Sheffield Wednesday ===
A right-footed winger, with a preference for playing on the left, Yogane began his career in the Sheffield Wednesday Academy. He progressed through the youth ranks and was offered a scholarship at the end of the 2021–22 season, but he declined the offer and departed the club in August 2022.

=== Brentford ===
==== 2022–2024 ====
On 10 August 2022, Yogane signed a pre-contract to become a professional with the B team at Premier League club Brentford, for an undisclosed compensation fee. He began his time with the club as a scholar and a three-year professional contract was triggered on 24 September 2022, his 17th birthday. He made concurrent appearances for the U18 team during the 2022–23 and 2023–24 seasons. Yogane made two first team friendly appearances during the 2023–24 pre-season and ended a "breakthrough" B team season with 29 appearances.

==== 2024–25 and loan to Exeter City ====
Yogane was included in the first team squad for its 2024–25 pre-season training camp in Portugal and he made five pre and early-season friendly appearances. Yogane won his maiden competitive first team call-up for an EFL Cup third round match versus Leyton Orient on 17 September 2024 and he made his debut as a substitute late in the 3–1 victory. On 2 December 2024, Yogane signed a new 2 1/2-year contract. After featuring as an unused substitute in seven further senior matches and making 14 B team appearances so far during the 2024–25 season, Yogane joined League One club Exeter City on loan for the remainder of the season on 23 January 2025. He made 19 appearances during his spell. After the League One season ended, Yogane resumed match play for Brentford B and scored the winner in the 3–2 Professional Development League Final victory over Bournemouth.

==== 2025–26 and loan to Dundee ====
On 30 June 2025, Yogane joined Scottish Premiership club Dundee on a season-long loan. He made 42 appearances during a mid-table 2025–26 season and scored his first professional goal, in a 2–1 victory over Motherwell on 7 March 2026. The loan saw Yogane undertake extra fitness work and adjust his diet. Yogane transferred out of Brentford in June 2026.

=== Aberdeen ===
On 19 June 2026, Yogane transferred to Scottish Premiership club Aberdeen and signed a four-year contract for an undisclosed fee.

== Career statistics ==
As of match played 5 September 2026

Appearances and goals by club, season and competition
Club	Season	League			National cup (Note: Includes FA Cup, Scottish Cup)		League cup (Note: Includes EFL Cup, Scottish League Cup)		Total	
Club	Season	Division	Apps	Goals	Apps	Goals	Apps	Goals	Apps	Goals
Brentford	2024–25	Premier League	0	0	0	0	1	0	1	0
Exeter City (loan)	2024–25	League One	18	0	1	0	―		19	0
Dundee (loan)	2025–26	Scottish Premiership	36	1	2	0	4	0	42	1
Aberdeen	2026–27	Scottish Premiership	4	0	0	0	5	0	9	0
Career total			58	1	3	0	10	0	71	1

== Honours ==
Brentford B

- Premier League Cup: 2022–23
