= Robbie Hemfrey =

Scottish footballer (born 2002)

Personal information
- Full name: Robbie Jack Hemfrey
- Date of birth: 21 January 2002 (age 24)
- Place of birth: Wishaw, Scotland
- Height: 1.93 m (6 ft 4 in)
- Position: Goalkeeper

Youth career
- Motherwell
- 2020–2022: Stoke City

Senior career*
Years	Team	Apps	(Gls)
2022–2023	Rotherham United	1	(0)
2024	Airdrieonians	9	(0)
2024–2025	Arbroath	0	(0)
2024–2025	→ Clyde (loan)	23	(0)
2025	East Kilbride		
2026	East Fife	9	(0)

International career
2017	Scotland U16	2	(0)
2018	Scotland U17	3	(0)
- * Club domestic league appearances and goals as of 4 May 2026

Robbie Jack Hemfrey (born 21 February 2002) is a Scottish professional footballer who plays as a goalkeeper.

== Club career ==
Born in Wishaw, Hemfrey trained with Benfica's academy at the age of 13, whilst signed to Motherwell.

Hemfrey then played for Stoke City before signing for Rotherham United in September 2022. He made his senior debut on 18 April 2023 in a 2–2 draw against Burnley, appearing as a half-time substitute after an injury to Josh Vickers and being hailed as a "hero" for his performance.

Hemfrey left Rotherham at the end of the 2022–23 season upon the expiry of his contract.

In March 2024 he signed for Airdrieonians. Later that month he won the Scottish Challenge Cup with the club.

In June 2024, Hemfrey joined Scottish League One club Arbroath on a two-year deal. On 21 September 2024, Hemfrey moved on loan to Clyde until January 2025.

After spending time with East Kilbride, he signed for East Fife in January 2026.

== International career ==
He played for Scotland at under-16 and under-17 levels.

== Career statistics ==
As of match played 25 April 2026

Appearances and goals by club, season and competition
Club	Season	League			National cup (Note: Includes FA Cup, Scottish Cup)		League cup (Note: Includes EFL Cup, Scottish League Cup)		Other		Total	
Club	Season	Division	Apps	Goals	Apps	Goals	Apps	Goals	Apps	Goals	Apps	Goals
Rotherham United	2022–23	EFL Championship	1	0	0	0	0	0	0	0	1	0
Airdrieonians	2023–24	Scottish Championship	9	0	0	0	0	0	3 (Note: One appearance in Scottish Challenge Cup, Two appearances in Scottish Premiership play-offs)	0	12	0
Arbroath	2024–25	Scottish League One	0	0	0	0	1	0	0	0	1	0
Clyde (loan)	2024–25	Scottish League Two	23	0	1	0	0	0	0	0	24	0
East Fife	2025–26	Scottish League One	8	0	0	0	0	0	1 (Note: Appearance in Scottish Challenge Cup)	0	9	0
Career total			41	0	1	0	1	0	4	0	47	0

== Honours ==
Airdrieonians

- Scottish Challenge Cup: 2023–24
