= César Garza =

Mexican footballer

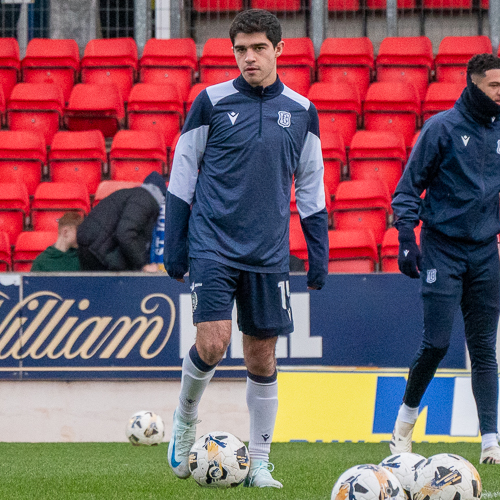
- Garza in 2024

Personal information
- Full name: César Garza Cantú
- Date of birth: 1 July 2005 (age 21)
- Place of birth: San Pedro Garza García, Mexico
- Height: 1.73 m (5 ft 8 in)
- Position: Midfielder

Team information
- Current team: Monterrey
- Number: 18

Youth career
- 2017–2023: Monterrey

Senior career*
Years	Team	Apps	(Gls)
2023–	Monterrey	20	(2)
2025	→ Dundee (loan)	11	(0)
2026	→ Pumas (loan)	15	(0)

International career^{‡}
2024–2025	Mexico U20	15	(0)
Medal record
Men's football
Representing Mexico
CONCACAF U-20 Championship
Winner	2024 Mexico
- * Club domestic league appearances and goals as of 21 November 2026 ‡ National team caps and goals as of 11 October 2025

César Garza Cantú (born 1 July 2005) is a Mexican professional footballer who plays as a midfielder for Liga MX club Monterrey.

== Club career ==
=== Monterrey ===
Born in San Pedro Garza García in the Mexican state of Nuevo León, Garza joined Monterrey's Youth Academy in 2017 through the Rayados en la Mira program, starting with the U-13 category and progressing through the U-16, U-18, and U-23 teams.

On 22 October 2023, Garza made his senior professional debut for the club in a 1–0 away win over Pumas, coming on the 75th minute for Jonathan González. Garza would score his first goal for the club on 8 November, the third goal in Monterrey's 3–0 win against Santos Laguna.

Following the end of the 2024 Apertura season in which the club finished as runners-up, Garza was linked to Scottish club Dundee which was due to their partnership with each other. Monterrey announced his departure on 21 December 2024.

==== Loan to Dundee ====
On 22 December 2024, Dundee announced the signing of Garza on a one-year loan deal, receiving the number 14. On 5 January 2025, Garza made his first team debut for the Dark Blues as a substitute in a league victory away to St Johnstone. Garza made his first start for Dundee four days later in a home draw against Rangers.

== International career ==
In March 2024, Garza received his first Mexico U20 national team call up for friendliest against Honduras and Costa Rica. He was part of the Mexico squad that won the 2024 CONCACAF U-20 Championship in León, Mexico, after defeating the United States 2–1 in the final.

In 2025, Garza was called up by coach Eduardo Arce to represent Mexico at the FIFA U-20 World Cup held in Chile.

== Career statistics ==
=== Club ===
As of match played on 21 November 2026

Appearances and goals by club, season and competition
Club	Season	League			National cup (Note: Includes Scottish Cup)		League cup (Note: Includes Scottish League Cup)		Continental		Other		Total	
Club	Season	Division	Apps	Goals	Apps	Goals	Apps	Goals	Apps	Goals	Apps	Goals	Apps	Goals
Monterrey	2023–24	Liga MX	8	1	—		—		2 (Note: Appearances in CONCACAF Champions Cup)	0	—		10	1
Monterrey	2024–25	Liga MX	2	0	—		—		—		—		2	0
Monterrey	2026–27	Liga MX	10	1	—		—		—		1 (Note: Appearances in Leagues Cup)	0	11	1
Monterrey	Total		20	2	—		—		2	0	1	0	23	2
Dundee (loan)	2024–25	Scottish Premiership	9	0	2	0	—		—		—		11	0
Dundee (loan)	2025–26	Scottish Premiership	2	0	—		3	0	—		—		5	0
Dundee (loan)	Total		11	0	2	0	3	0	—		—		16	0
Pumas	2025–26	Liga MX	15	0	—		—		1	0	—		16	0
Career total			46	2	2	0	3	0	3	0	1	0	55	2

== Honors ==
Mexico U20

- CONCACAF Under-20 Championship: 2024
