= 2023–24 Dundee F.C. season =

Dundee
2023–24 season
- Chairman: Tim Keyes
- Manager: Tony Docherty
- Stadium: Dens Park
- Scottish Premiership: 6th
- Scottish Cup: Fourth round
- League Cup: Group stage
- Top goalscorer: League: Luke McCowan (10); All: Luke McCowan (10)
- Highest home attendance: 9,144 vs. Celtic, 26 December 2023 (Prem.)
- Lowest home attendance: 1,940 vs. Dumbarton, 26 July 2023 (League Cup GS)
- Average home league attendance: 6,965
Home colours	Away colours	Third colours

The 2023–24 season was Dundee's first season back in the top flight of Scottish football since 2021–22, after winning the previous season's Scottish Championship at the first time of asking. Dundee also competed in the League Cup, exiting at the group stage, and in the Scottish Cup, exiting in the fourth round.

Dundee would enjoy a successful league season, confirming a finish in the top six in April 2024 for the first time since the 2014–15 season.

== Season summary ==
=== Pre-season ===
Despite having led Dundee to the Scottish Championship title and winning the SPFL Championship Manager of the Year award, manager Gary Bowyer and his assistant Billy Barr were released by the club in May 2023 following a fallout with managing director John Nelms and technical director Gordon Strachan. On 29 May, Dundee announced that Tony Docherty would be the new manager of the club. Dundee's pre-season schedule would include a week-long camp in Ireland and playing Bray Wanderers and Fleetwood Town while there, as well as two visits to local Angus teams in Brechin City and Arbroath, followed by an away game against Cove Rangers.

=== July ===
After winning all of their pre-season games, Dundee began their competitive campaign in the Scottish League Cup group stage with a gritty away win over Bonnyrigg Rose, with Zak Rudden scoring the only goal. They would receive a sharp wake-up call a few days later however, losing to Scottish Championship side Airdrieonians via a late penalty after Lyall Cameron missed a penalty for Dundee earlier in the game. The Dees got back to winning ways on the following Wednesday, defeating Dumbarton comfortably at home. Going into their final game, Dundee knew they needed to defeat Inverness Caledonian Thistle by 2 or more goals in order to qualify over Raith Rovers for the second round. Despite managing a 1–0 win over their historical bogey team, Dundee would exit the League Cup in the group stage for the first time since the 2016–17 season via goals scored.

=== August ===
On their flag-raising day returning to the top tier, Dundee would come back from behind through a Lyall Cameron goal to draw with Motherwell at a rain-drenched Dens Park. A dreadful first half in Paisley however was too much to recover from the next week, and saw Dundee lose to St Mirren. After a two-week hiatus, Dundee grabbed their first win of the league season at home to Hearts through a Luke McCowan chip over Zander Clark from distance.

=== September ===
Despite a strong performance for most of the game, a late collapse away to St Johnstone left Dundee with a very disappointing point. After the international break, a brave effort from the Dee at Celtic Park was undone by an early second half blitz from Celtic and led to a 3–0 defeat. In a drama-filled game which Dundee were down a man for most of the game, Zak Rudden's late goal clinched a point at home to Kilmarnock. The following week saw a very impressive defensive performance at Easter Road as they kept free-scoring Hibernian to a goalless draw.

=== October ===
After three and a half weeks without a game due to international breaks and postponements caused by a waterlogged pitch and Storm Babet, Dundee played Ross County to a scoreless draw at home in a game that was plagued by rustiness from both sides. After an uneventful first half and controversial second half, two late Joe Shaughnessy goals pushed Dundee past Livingston at Almondvale Stadium and into the top six.

=== November ===
Dundee's unbeaten streak at home would fall apart after a mauling by Rangers in a game marred by controversial behaviour from the away supporters. They would quickly rebound with a second win over Livingston in a week thanks to a beautiful free kick from Luke McCowan. Dundee would then batter high-flying St Mirren in a commanding performance to rise up to 5th in the league before the international break. They would return from the hiatus with a frustrating loss at home to Hibs where they failed to complete the comeback.

=== December ===
For the second time in the season, an impressive Dundee away performance was undone by a last-second equaliser, this time from ten-man Motherwell. An early lead at Ibrox turned into an expected defeat to Rangers, marking the third straight game Dundee failed to capitalise on having a man advantage. Dundee would finally enjoy a late goal once again as captain Joe Shaughnessy snatched all 3 points away to Ross County in a game which losing manager Derek Adams controversially claimed was "one of the worst games I've ever seen." For the second time in the season, Dundee had a game against Aberdeen postponed, this time due to a waterlogged pitch, a decision which the club fully disagreed with. The pitch was fine however on Boxing Day with Celtic visiting, and despite keeping a clean sheet in the first half Dundee once again capitulated to a standard home defeat to the Hoops. Dundee would end the year in a typically ridiculous fashion, starting brilliantly away to Kilmarnock before capitulating once more at the end, before being bailed out once again by captain Shaughnessy to take home a point.

=== January ===
The new year would start with early frustrations, as Dundee lost standout loan player Owen Beck to an early recall from Liverpool, and the Dens Park drainage failed the club again the following day, leading to their match against St Johnstone being postponed. After a lengthy winter break, Dundee returned to action in a sluggish state, gifting two goals in the first three minutes to Kilmarnock and sank out of the Scottish Cup in usual disappointing fashion, eclipsing Hibernian's infamous 114-year long wait for a major team to lift the cup. The underwhelming start to 2024 continued midweek at Tynecastle, where a strong 0–2 lead at half time would evaporate into a Hearts win in yet another blown lead which resulted in no points, and also marked the first loss of back-to-back games in the season. Despite starting off scrappily at Almondvale Stadium, Dundee responded with an emphatic away win over bottom side Livingston, with new boy Michael Mellon coming off the bench and netting a goal and two assists in a 1–4 win. Dundee would end the month by finally playing Aberdeen for the first time of the season, and a Lee Ashcroft headed goal off a corner from the returning Owen Beck was enough to earn a point at Pittodrie.

=== February ===
Dundee would commemorate Groundhog Day by marking the day following the holiday by again leading Hearts at half-time with a good performance before handing away another three points for the second time in under 2 weeks. They would fail to turn their momentum around in Paisley, with a flat performance resulting in a defeat away to St Mirren. Despite a slow start, a Luke McCowan penalty and a Jordan McGhee header provided a much-needed comeback win to consolidate Dundee's position in the top 6 at home against St Johnstone. Dundee would continue this positive momentum the following week against Ross County, with a double from Scott Tiffoney proving the difference. The momentum would end at Easter Road, where despite nearly grabbing something late on the Dee were second-best to Hibernian throughout and gave up a lot of ground they had on their rivals for the top 6. The month ended in harrowing fashion, with Dundee shipping 6 goals in the first half to a rampant Celtic in a nightmare evening in Glasgow.

=== March ===
The Dee would again play an evenly-matched game against Europe-chasing Kilmarnock, and despite leading late against ten men they again dropped points in stoppage time in a third consecutive 2–2 draw against the Ayrshire side. After an extended break, Dundee returned in solid form despite injuries and comfortably defeated managerless Aberdeen through a Luke McCowan penalty, lifting the Dees back into the top six after keeping their first clean sheet against the Dons in almost 20 years. Dundee's pitch issues would rear their head once again a few days later, with heavy rainfall creating a waterlogged pitch at Dens Park which would get their match against Rangers postponed. After the international break, Dundee returned with a vengeance to McDiarmid Park, and despite looking second best to St Johnstone in large parts they brought home all 3 points through two clinical strikes. After an unbeaten and very successful March, manager Tony Docherty was awarded the Premiership Manager of the Month by the SPFL.

=== April ===
After much controversy regarding the playability of Dens Park's pitch, Dundee would take on Motherwell in a chaotic affair, with a 2-goal lead in the second half not being good enough for the fourth time this season as the visitors snatched all three points late and denied the Dee from securing a top six place. The scrutiny on Dundee's pitch would increase even more for the rearranged midweek game against Rangers, which would be called off for yet another waterlogged pitch. Though a strong 2nd half showing at Pittodrie was not enough to break a goalless deadlock against Aberdeen (their first clean sheet against the Dons since December 2004), a late equaliser for Motherwell over Hibs ensured that Dundee's point would be enough for them to secure top six football with a game to spare. After much scrutiny and both the SPFL and UEFA getting involved surrounding potential relocation options, Dundee finally played Rangers on the midweek, and held the title contenders to a goalless draw, their first clean sheet against the side since December 2001, to bring the Dark Blues closer to St Mirren and a potential European spot in 5th place. Dundee began their post-split fixtures on 28 April with a close-fought game against league leaders Celtic which ended in a narrow defeat.

On 18 April, Dundee received a £186,429.60 fine from the SPFL, of which £120,000 was suspended, for "breaches of the SPFL rules" regarding the number of postponements and for the SPFL to recoup costs owed to Sky Sports. The club responded as being "deeply disappointed" with the severity of the fine and the warning of a single postponement the following season triggering the remainder of the fine to be immediately payable, and announced they were seeking legal advice regarding an appeal. Dundee's successful season was recognised by PFA Scotland, as Lyall Cameron was nominated for Young Player of the Year and manager Tony Docherty was nominated for Manager of the Year. Luke McCowan was also named as the Scottish Premiership Player of the Month for April.

=== May ===
In a massive game with a spot in the UEFA Conference League potentially on the line, Dundee were outclassed by a rampant St Mirren side at Dens in a disappointing defeat which would all but cement Dundee's ceiling being 6th place. Lyall Cameron and Tony Docherty were again recognised, this time by the Scottish Football Writers' Association, whom nominated the two for their Young Player of the Year and Manager of the Year awards respectively. Dundee would again serve up another toothless performance in a scorcher at Tynecastle as they were battered away by Hearts. In the penultimate game of the season, despite two quickfire goals to give great hope at Ibrox, Dundee once again turned a multiple goal lead into a defeat and officially saw themselves eliminated from European qualification. On a glorious sunny May day at Dens, Dundee ended their season with yet another draw against Kilmarnock as the home side couldn't find a winner against 10 men, with player of the year Luke McCowan knocking a late penalty to win the game wide of the post.

== Competitions ==
Win Draw Loss Postponed

All times are in British Summer Time (BST).

=== Pre-season and friendlies ===
1 July 2023 Friendly	Brechin City	1–5	Dundee	Glebe Park, Brechin
15:00	Loudon 67'	Report	Tiffoney 19', 36'; Anderson 45+1'; Jones (trialist) 81'; Allan 90'	Attendance: 1,527; Referee: Andy Gamble

5 July 2023 Friendly	Bray Wanderers	1–5	Dundee	Carlisle Grounds, Bray, Ireland
19:30	Butcher 39'	Report	Robinson 11', 44'; Beck 19'; Rudden 58', 76'	Referee: Oliver Moran (FAI)

8 July 2023 Friendly	Fleetwood Town	1–2	Dundee	Waterford RSC, Waterford, Ireland
12:30	Marriott 37'	Report	Robinson 27'; McCowan 84'

12 July 2023 Friendly	Arbroath	0–1	Dundee	Gayfield Park, Arbroath
19:15		Report	Robinson 37'	Attendance: 2,160

15 July 2023 Friendly	Cove Rangers	0–1	Dundee	Balmoral Stadium, Aberdeen
15:00		Report	Rudden 66'	Referee: Greg Soutar

16 November 2023 Cammy Kerr Testimonial	Dundee	1–0	Celtic	Dens Park, Dundee
19:45	Kerr 90' (pen.)	Report		Attendance: 3,363

=== Scottish Premiership ===
Dundee played against Aberdeen, Celtic, Heart of Midlothian, Hibernian, Kilmarnock, Livingston, Motherwell, Rangers, Ross County, St Johnstone and St Mirren in the 2023–24 Premiership campaign. The format consisted of playing each team three times, twice at home and once away against half of the teams, and once at home and twice away against the other half. Following this, they are split into either a top or bottom group of six depending on their position after 33 games, where they play each team in their group once.

5 August 2023 1	Dundee	1–1	Motherwell	Dens Park, Dundee
15:00	Cameron 68'	Report	Bair 45'	Attendance: 6,391; Referee: David Dickinson

12 August 2023 2	St Mirren	2–1	Dundee	St Mirren Park, Paisley
15:00	Shaughnessy 7' (o.g.); Mandron 45+4'	Report	Mulligan 63'	Attendance: 6,581; Referee: Colin Steven

27 August 2023 3	Dundee	1–0	Heart of Midlothian	Dens Park, Dundee
15:00	McCowan 63'	Report		Attendance: 8,104; Referee: Alan Muir

2 September 2023 4	St Johnstone	2–2	Dundee	McDiarmid Park, Perth
15:00	Kucheriavyi 82', 90+6'	Report	Tiffoney 35'; Lamie 58'	Attendance: 5,935; Referee: Willie Collum

16 September 2023 5	Celtic	3–0	Dundee	Celtic Park, Glasgow
15:00	Turnbull 51' (pen.); Furuhashi 63'; O'Riley 67'	Report		Attendance: 58,928; Referee: Grant Irvine

23 September 2023 6	Dundee	2–2	Kilmarnock	Dens Park, Dundee
15:00	Bakayoko 16'; Mulligan (red card) 34'; Rudden 90+3'	Report	Armstrong 30' (pen.), 81'	Attendance: 6,101; Referee: David Munro

30 September 2023 7	Hibernian	0–0	Dundee	Easter Road, Edinburgh
15:00		Report		Attendance: 16,793; Referee: John Beaton

24 October 2023 8*	Dundee	0–0	Ross County	Dens Park, Dundee
19:45		Report		Attendance: 4,887; Referee: Colin Steven
Note: Initially postponed and rescheduled due to a waterlogged pitch. Original date was 7 October 2023.

28 October 2023 9	Livingston	0–2	Dundee	Almondvale Stadium, Livingston
15:00	Montaño (red card) 70'	Report	Shaughnessy 82', 85'	Attendance: 4,210; Referee: Willie Collum

1 November 2023 10	Dundee	0–5	Rangers	Dens Park, Dundee
20:45*		Report	Jack 5'; Danilo 51'; Lammers 74'; Dessers 83'; Tavernier 90+1' (pen.)	Attendance: 8,970; Referee: Kevin Clancy
Note: Game delayed a total of 1 hour due to traffic disruption and safety concerns due to flares set off by Rangers fans.

5 November 2023 11*	Dundee	1–0	Livingston	Dens Park, Dundee
14:00	McCowan 57'	Report		Attendance: 4,769; Referee: Alan Muir
Note: Game was brought forward with the agreement of both clubs. Original date was 6 December 2023.

11 November 2023 12	Dundee	4–0	St Mirren	Dens Park, Dundee
15:00	Bakayoko 16', 57'; Rudden 45+2' (pen.); Robinson 85'	Report		Attendance: 5,496; Referee: Matthew MacDermid

25 November 2023 13	Dundee	1–2	Hibernian	Dens Park, Dundee
15:00	Beck 86'	Report	Tavares 16'; Miller 58', (red card) 63'	Attendance: 6,652; Referee: Don Robertson

2 December 2023 14	Motherwell	3–3	Dundee	Fir Park, Motherwell
15:00	Biereth 6'; Mugabi 68'; Paton (red card) 72'; Wilkinson 90+7'	Report	Cameron 30'; Beck 34'; Robinson 88'	Attendance: 4,239; Referee: Iain Snedden

9 December 2023 15	Rangers	3–1	Dundee	Ibrox Stadium, Glasgow
15:00	Dessers 20'; Tavernier 26' (pen.); Sima 34'; Cifuentes (red card) 45+6'	Report	Bakayoko 5'	Attendance: 47,229; Referee: Kevin Clancy

16 December 2023 16	Ross County	0–1	Dundee	Victoria Park, Dingwall
15:00		Report	Shaughnessy 90+7'	Attendance: 4,014; Referee: Colin Steven

26 December 2023 17	Dundee	0–3	Celtic	Dens Park, Dundee
15:00		Report	Bernardo 52'; M. Johnston 83', 90+1'	Attendance: 9,144; Referee: Don Robertson

30 December 2023 18	Kilmarnock	2–2	Dundee	Rugby Park, Kilmarnock
15:00	Wright 85'; McKenzie 90+3'	Report	McCowan 35'; Shaughnessy 90+5'	Attendance: 5,780; Referee: David Dickinson

23 January 2024 19*	Heart of Midlothian	3–2	Dundee	Tynecastle Park, Edinburgh
19:45	Nieuwenhof 57'; Lembikisa 74'; Oda 86'	Report	McGhee 19'; Cameron 38'	Attendance: 18,185; Referee: Chris Graham
Note: Initially postponed and rescheduled due to conflict with Hearts' Scottish League Cup tie. Original date was 4 November 2023.

27 January 2024 20	Livingston	1–4	Dundee	Almondvale Stadium, Livingston
15:00	Yengi 78' (pen.)	Report	Bakayoko 19'; McCowan 62', (red card) 74'; Robinson 79'; Mellon 87'	Attendance: 1,906; Referee: Ross Hardie

30 January 2024 21*	Aberdeen	1–1	Dundee	Pittodrie Stadium, Aberdeen
19:45	Miovski 31' (pen.)	Report	Ashcroft 55'	Attendance: 15,512; Referee: Nick Walsh
Note: Initially postponed and rescheduled due to adverse weather from Storm Babet. Original date was 21 October 2023.

3 February 2024 22	Dundee	2–3	Heart of Midlothian	Dens Park, Dundee
15:00	McGhee 26'; Cameron 59'	Report	Forrest 55'; Shankland 79' (pen.), 87'	Attendance: 7,506; Referee: Graham Grainger

7 February 2024 23	St Mirren	2–0	Dundee	St Mirren Park, Paisley
20:15*	Mandron 73'; Bolton (red card) 84'; Olusanya 90+1'	Report		Attendance: 5,737; Referee: Steven McLean
Note: Game delayed by 30 minutes due to traffic disruption.

11 February 2024 24*	Dundee	2–1	St Johnstone	Dens Park, Dundee
14:00	McCowan 75' (pen.); McGhee 89'	Report	M. Smith 9'	Attendance: 7,102; Referee: David Munro
Note: Initially postponed and rescheduled due to a waterlogged pitch. Original date was 2 January 2024.

17 February 2024 25	Dundee	2–0	Ross County	Dens Park, Dundee
15:00	Tiffoney 45', 65'	Report		Attendance: 5,846; Referee: Calum Scott

24 February 2024 26	Hibernian	2–1	Dundee	Easter Road, Edinburgh
15:00	Vente 35' (pen.); Maolida 81'	Report	McCowan 78'	Attendance: 16,102; Referee: John Beaton

28 February 2024 27	Celtic	7–1	Dundee	Celtic Park, Glasgow
19:45	Carter-Vickers 7'; Idah 18'; O'Riley 22'; Maeda 30'; Taylor 36'; McGregor 45+6'; Kelly 63'	Report	Robertson (red card) 76'; Mellon 84'	Attendance: 58,772; Referee: Matthew MacDermid

2 March 2024 28	Dundee	2–2	Kilmarnock	Dens Park, Dundee
15:00	Dennis 11' (o.g.); McCowan 63' (pen.)	Report	Watkins 35'; Mayo (red card) 60'; Deas 90+1'	Attendance: 5,588; Referee: Colin Steven

13 March 2024 29*	Dundee	1–0	Aberdeen	Dens Park, Dundee
19:45	McCowan 66' (pen.)	Report		Attendance: 8,215; Referee: Steven McLean
Note: Initially postponed and rescheduled due to a waterlogged pitch. Original date was 23 December 2023.

30 March 2024 30	St Johnstone	1–2	Dundee	McDiarmid Park, Perth
15:00	Sidibeh 60'	Report	Cameron 6'; Bakayoko 80'	Attendance: 6,691; Referee: Iain Snedden

6 April 2024 31	Dundee	2–3	Motherwell	Dens Park, Dundee
15:00	McGhee 36'; McCowan 70'	Report	Gent 79'; Bair 81'; Moses 90+3'	Attendance: 5,924; Referee: David Dickinson

13 April 2024 32	Aberdeen	0–0	Dundee	Pittodrie Stadium, Aberdeen
15:00	Shinnie (red card) 90+6'	Report		Attendance: 17,176; Referee: Nick Walsh

17 April 2024 33*	Dundee	0–0	Rangers	Dens Park, Dundee
20:00		Report		Attendance: 9,010; Referee: Don Robertson
Note: Initially postponed and rescheduled on two separate occasions due to a waterlogged pitch. Original date was 17 March 2024.

28 April 2024 34	Dundee	1–2	Celtic	Dens Park, Dundee
15:00	Portales 74'	Report	Forrest 30', 67'	Attendance: 9,120; Referee: John Beaton

4 May 2024 35	Dundee	1–3	St Mirren	Dens Park, Dundee
15:00	Mellon 76'	Report	Gogić 38'; Tanser 59'; Olusanya 72'	Attendance: 6,877; Referee: Matthew MacDermid

11 May 2024 36	Heart of Midlothian	3–0	Dundee	Tynecastle Park, Edinburgh
15:00	Vargas 35'; Forrest 53'; Shankland 90'	Report		Attendance: 18,757; Referee: Nick Walsh

14 May 2024 37	Rangers	5–2	Dundee	Ibrox Stadium, Glasgow
19:30	McCausland 45'; Dessers 52'; Cantwell 65'; Wright 87', 90+3'	Report	McGhee 38'; Portales 40'	Attendance: 45,760; Referee: Matthew MacDermid

18 May 2024 38	Dundee	1–1	Kilmarnock	Dens Park, Dundee
12:30	McCowan 37'	Report	Mackay-Steven 24'; Deas (red card) 84'	Attendance: 6,637; Referee: Calum Scott

==== League table ====
Pos	Team	Pld	W	D	L	GF	GA	GD	Pts	Qualification or relegation (Note: Teams play each other three times (33 matches), before the league is split into two groups (the top six and the bottom six).)
4	Kilmarnock	38	14	14	10	46	44	+2	56	Qualification for the Europa League second qualifying round
5	St Mirren	38	13	8	17	46	52	−6	47	Qualification for the Conference League second qualifying round
6	Dundee	38	10	12	16	49	68	−19	42	
7	Aberdeen	38	12	12	14	48	52	−4	48	
8	Hibernian	38	11	13	14	52	59	−7	46	

Rules for classification: 1) Points; 2) Goal difference; 3) Goals scored; 4) Head-to-Head points; 5) Head-to-Head goal difference; 6) Play-off (only if deciding champion, UEFA competitions qualification, second stage group allocation or relegation).

==== Results by round ====
Round	1	2	3	4	5	6	7	8	9	10	11	12	13	14	15	16	17	18	19	20	21	22	23	24	25	26	27	28	29	30	31	32	33	34	35	36	37	38
Ground	H	A	H	A	A	H	A	H	A	H	H	H	H	A	A	A	H	A	A	A	A	H	A	H	H	A	A	H	H	A	H	A	H	H	H	A	A	H
Result	D	L	W	D	L	D	D	D	W	L	W	W	L	D	L	W	L	D	L	W	D	L	L	W	W	L	L	D	W	W	L	D	D	L	L	L	L	D
Position	5	8	6	6	9	9	9	10	5	9	6	5	7	6	7	7	7	7	8	7	6	6	6	6	6	6	6	7	6	6	6	6	6	6	6	6	6	6

Source: Competitive matches
A = Away; H = Home; W = Win; D = Draw; L = Loss

=== Scottish Cup ===
Dundee competed in the Scottish Cup, entering in the fourth round.

20 January 2024 Fourth round	Kilmarnock	2–0	Dundee	Rugby Park, Kilmarnock
15:00	Vassell 1'; Watkins 3'	Report		Attendance: 5,425; Referee: Don Robertson

=== Scottish League Cup ===
Dundee were a top seed in the group stage draw that will take place on 8 June 2023 at 13:00 on Viaplay and the SPFL's YouTube channel. Dundee were drawn into Group E along with Inverness Caledonian Thistle, Airdrieonians, Dumbarton and Bonnyrigg Rose.

==== Group stage ====
18 July 2023 1	Bonnyrigg Rose	0–1	Dundee	New Dundas Park, Bonnyrigg
19:45		Report	Rudden 47'	Attendance: 1,555; Referee: Peter Stuart

22 July 2023 2	Airdrieonians	1–0	Dundee	Excelsior Stadium, Airdrie
15:00	McCabe 89' (pen.)	Report		Attendance: 1,489; Referee: Colin Steven

26 July 2023 3	Dundee	3–1	Dumbarton	Dens Park, Dundee
19:45	Robinson 38', 76' (pen.); Pineda 44'	Report	T. Wallace 41'; Durnan (red card) 75'	Attendance: 1,940; Referee: Willie Collum

30 July 2023 4	Dundee	1–0	Inverness Caledonian Thistle	Dens Park, Dundee
15:00	Robinson 60'	Report		Attendance: 2,337; Referee: John Beaton

==== Group E table ====
Pos	Team	Pld	W	PW	PL	L	GF	GA	GD	Pts	Qualification	AIR	DND	DUM	ICT	BON
1	Airdrieonians	4	4	0	0	0	7	2	+5	12	Qualification for the second round	—	1–0	2–0	—	—
2	Dundee	4	3	0	0	1	5	2	+3	9		—	—	3–1	1–0	—
3	Dumbarton	4	1	1	0	2	3	6	−3	5		—	—	—	2–1	p0–0
4	Inverness Caledonian Thistle	4	1	0	0	3	5	7	−2	3		2–3	—	—	—	2–1
5	Bonnyrigg Rose	4	0	0	1	3	1	4	−3	1		0–1	0–1	—	—	—

Rules for classification: 1) goal difference, 2) goals scored, 3) away goals scored, 4) matches won, 5) away matches won, 6) drawing of lots.

== Squad statistics ==
As of 18 May 2024

No.	Pos	Nat	Player	Total		Premiership		Scottish Cup		League Cup	
No.	Pos	Nat	Player	Apps	Goals	Apps	Goals	Apps	Goals	Apps	Goals
1	GK	(England) ENG	Adam Legzdins	2	0	0	0	1	0	1	0
3	DF	(England) ENG	Owen Dodgson	17	0	13+3	0	0+1	0	0	0
4	DF	(Wales) WAL	Ryan Astley	3	0	2+1	0	0	0	0	0
5	DF	(Republic of Ireland) IRL	Joe Shaughnessy	38	4	33	4	1	0	4	0
6	DF	(Scotland) SCO	Jordan McGhee	37	5	32+1	5	1	0	2+1	0
7	FW	(Scotland) SCO	Scott Tiffoney	33	3	19+9	3	1	0	4	0
8	FW	(England) ENG	Curtis Main	15	0	4+10	0	0+1	0	0	0
9	FW	(Sierra Leone) SLE	Amadou Bakayoko	39	6	34+3	6	1	0	0+1	0
10	MF	(Scotland) SCO	Lyall Cameron	36	5	28+4	5	0	0	2+2	0
11	FW	(Mexico) MEX	Diego Pineda	6	1	0+3	0	0	0	2+1	1
12	DF	(Scotland) SCO	Ricki Lamie	21	1	15+6	1	0	0	0	0
15	MF	(Scotland) SCO	Josh Mulligan	23	1	6+12	1	1	0	3+1	0
16	FW	(England) ENG	Zach Robinson	25	6	10+11	3	0+1	0	3	3
17	MF	(Scotland) SCO	Luke McCowan	41	10	37	10	1	0	2+1	0
19	MF	(Scotland) SCO	Finlay Robertson	16	0	6+7	0	0	0	0+3	0
21	MF	(Wales) WAL	Ryan Howley	14	0	2+11	0	1	0	0	0
22	GK	(Scotland) SCO	Jon McCracken	15	0	12	0	0	0	3	0
23	MF	(England) ENG	Malachi Boateng	36	0	25+7	0	0	0	3+1	0
25	DF	(Northern Ireland) NIR	Aaron Donnelly	21	0	18+3	0	0	0	0	0
26	FW	(Scotland) SCO	Michael Mellon	14	3	3+11	3	0	0	0	0
28	MF	(France) FRA	Mohamed Sylla	25	0	19+5	0	1	0	0	0
29	DF	(Mexico) MEX	Antonio Portales	24	2	21+1	2	0	0	2	0
30	GK	(Scotland) SCO	Harrison Sharp	2	0	1	0	0+1	0	0	0
31	GK	(Northern Ireland) NIR	Trevor Carson	25	0	25	0	0	0	0	0
44	MF	(Republic of Ireland) IRL	Dara Costelloe	17	0	8+8	0	1	0	0	0
49	FW	(England) ENG	Euan Mutale	0	0	0	0	0	0	0	0
63	DF	(Wales) WAL	Owen Beck	28	2	25	2	0	0	3	0
Players away from the club on loan:
2	DF	(Scotland) SCO	Cammy Kerr	12	0	4+6	0	0	0	2	0
4	DF	(England) ENG	Tyler French	0	0	0	0	0	0	0	0
8	MF	(Scotland) SCO	Shaun Byrne	0	0	0	0	0	0	0	0
14	DF	(Scotland) SCO	Lee Ashcroft	13	1	7+1	1	1	0	4	0
18	MF	(Scotland) SCO	Charlie Reilly	8	0	0+7	0	0+1	0	0	0
20	FW	(Scotland) SCO	Zak Rudden	16	3	9+5	2	0	0	2	1
24	MF	(Scotland) SCO	Max Anderson	1	0	0	0	0	0	1	0
33	DF	(Scotland) SCO	Jack Wilkie	1	0	0	0	0	0	1	0
45	DF	(Scotland) SCO	Luke Graham	0	0	0	0	0	0	0	0
48	MF	(Scotland) SCO	Callum Lamb	0	0	0	0	0	0	0	0
Players who left the club during the season:
32	MF	(England) ENG	Marcel Lewis	0	0	0	0	0	0	0	0

== Transfers ==
=== Summer ===
==== Players in ====
Date	Player	From	Fee
2 June 2023	(Republic of Ireland) Joe Shaughnessy	(Scotland) St Mirren	Free
7 June 2023	(Scotland) Scott Tiffoney	(Scotland) Partick Thistle	Free
8 June 2023	(Scotland) Charlie Reilly	(Scotland) Albion Rovers	Free
16 June 2023	(Mexico) Antonio Portales	(Mexico) Atlante	Free
30 June 2023	(England) Zach Robinson	(England) AFC Wimbledon	Loan
3 July 2023	(Scotland) Jon McCracken	(England) Norwich City	Loan
3 July 2023	(Wales) Owen Beck	(England) Liverpool	Loan
7 July 2023	(Mexico) Diego Pineda	(Mexico) Correcaminos UAT	Free
18 July 2023	(England) Malachi Boateng	(England) Crystal Palace	Loan
24 July 2023	(Northern Ireland) Aaron Donnelly	(England) Nottingham Forest	Loan
27 July 2023	(Sierra Leone) Amadou Bakayoko	(England) Forest Green Rovers	Loan
2 August 2023	(Northern Ireland) Trevor Carson	(Scotland) St Mirren	Undisclosed
25 August 2023	(France) Mohamed Sylla	(England) Hartlepool United	Undisclosed
26 August 2023	(Scotland) Ricki Lamie	(Scotland) Motherwell	Loan
28 August 2023	(Wales) Ryan Howley	(England) Coventry City	Loan
1 September 2023	(England) Marcel Lewis	(England) Burnley	Loan

==== Players out ====
Date	Player	To	Fee
3 August 2023	(Scotland) Harrison Sharp	(Scotland) Dunfermline Athletic	Loan
4 August 2023	(Scotland) Jack Wilkie	(Scotland) Edinburgh City	Loan
4 August 2023	(Scotland) Thomas Welsh	(Scotland) Arbroath	Loan
9 August 2023	(Scotland) Shaun Byrne	(Scotland) Raith Rovers	Loan
12 August 2023	(Scotland) Ewan Murray	(Scotland) Brechin City	Loan
15 August 2023	(Scotland) Jon McCracken	(England) Norwich City	Return from loan
19 August 2023	(England) Euan Mutale	(Scotland) Forfar Athletic	Loan
24 August 2023	(England) Marley Sweenie-Rowe	(Scotland) Stenhousemuir	Loan
28 August 2023	(Scotland) Max Anderson	(Scotland) Inverness CT	Loan
1 September 2023	(Scotland) Luke Graham	(Scotland) Montrose	Loan

=== Winter ===
==== Players in ====
Date	Player	From	Fee
1 January 2024	(Republic of Ireland) Dara Costelloe	(England) Burnley	Loan
17 January 2024	(England) Curtis Main	(India) Bengaluru	Free
18 January 2024	(Wales) Ryan Astley	(England) Everton	Undisclosed
19 January 2024	(England) Owen Dodgson	(England) Burnley	Loan
26 January 2024	(Scotland) Michael Mellon	(England) Burnley	Loan
30 January 2024	(Wales) Owen Beck	(England) Liverpool	Loan
1 February 2024	(Scotland) Jon McCracken	(England) Norwich City	Loan

==== Players out ====
Date	Player	To	Fee
12 September 2023	(England) Tyler French	(Scotland) Greenock Morton	Loan
11 November 2023	(Scotland) Callum Lamb	(Scotland) Civil Service Strollers	Loan
1 January 2024	(Wales) Owen Beck	(England) Liverpool	Return from loan
1 January 2024	(England) Marcel Lewis	(England) Burnley	Return from loan
13 January 2024	(Scotland) Thomas Welsh	(Scotland) Arbroath	Loan
19 January 2024	(Scotland) Rayan Mohammed	(Scotland) Forfar Athletic	Loan
25 January 2024	(Scotland) Cammy Kerr	(Scotland) Inverness CT	Loan
26 January 2024	(Scotland) Zak Rudden	(Scotland) Raith Rovers	Loan
2 February 2024	(Scotland) Finlay Allan	(Scotland) Forfar Athletic	Loan
9 February 2024	(Scotland) Jack Wilkie	(Scotland) Broughty Athletic	Loan
17 February 2024	(Scotland) Thomas Welsh	(Scotland) Civil Service Strollers	Loan
21 February 2024	(Scotland) Lee Ashcroft	(Scotland) Raith Rovers	Loan
23 February 2024	(Scotland) Charlie Reilly	(Scotland) Arbroath	Loan

=== End of season ===
==== New deals and extensions ====
Date	Player	Deal
23 February 2024	(Scotland) Ricki Lamie	Pre-contract agreement
28 May 2024	(Scotland) Luke Graham	Promoted to 1st team

==== Players out ====
Date	Player	To	Fee
28 May 2024	(Scotland) Jack Wilkie	(Scotland) Arbroath	End of contract
31 May 2024	(England) Owen Dodgson	(England) Burnley	Loan ended
31 May 2024	(Sierra Leone) Amadou Bakayoko	(England) Forest Green Rovers	Loan ended
31 May 2024	(Scotland) Ricki Lamie	(Scotland) Motherwell	Loan ended
31 May 2024	(England) Zach Robinson	(England) AFC Wimbledon	Loan ended
31 May 2024	(England) Ryan Howley	(England) Coventry City	Loan ended
31 May 2024	(Scotland) Jon McCracken	(England) Norwich City	Loan ended
31 May 2024	(England) Malachi Boateng	(England) Crystal Palace	Loan ended
31 May 2024	(Northern Ireland) Aaron Donnelly	(England) Nottingham Forest	Loan ended
31 May 2024	(England) Michael Mellon	(England) Burnley	Loan ended
31 May 2024	(Republic of Ireland) Dara Costelloe	(England) Burnley	Loan ended
31 May 2024	(Wales) Owen Beck	(England) Liverpool	Loan ended
31 May 2024	(England) Tyler French	(England) Sutton United	End of contract
31 May 2024	(Scotland) Shaun Byrne	(Scotland) Raith Rovers	End of contract

== End of season awards ==
=== Club Player of the Year awards ===
- Andrew De Vries Player of the Year: Luke McCowan
- Isobel Sneddon Young Player of the Year: Lyall Cameron
- Players' Player of the Year: Luke McCowan

=== National awards ===
Scottish Professional Football League

- Scottish Premiership Player of the Month (April 2024): Luke McCowan

PFA Scotland

- Scottish Premiership Team of the Year: Owen Beck
- Young Player of the Year nominee: Lyall Cameron
- Manager of the Year nominee: Tony Docherty

Scottish Football Writers' Association

- Young Player of the Year nominee: Lyall Cameron
- Manager of the Year nominee: Tony Docherty

== See also ==
- List of Dundee F.C. seasons
