= Jon McCracken =

Scottish footballer (born 2000)

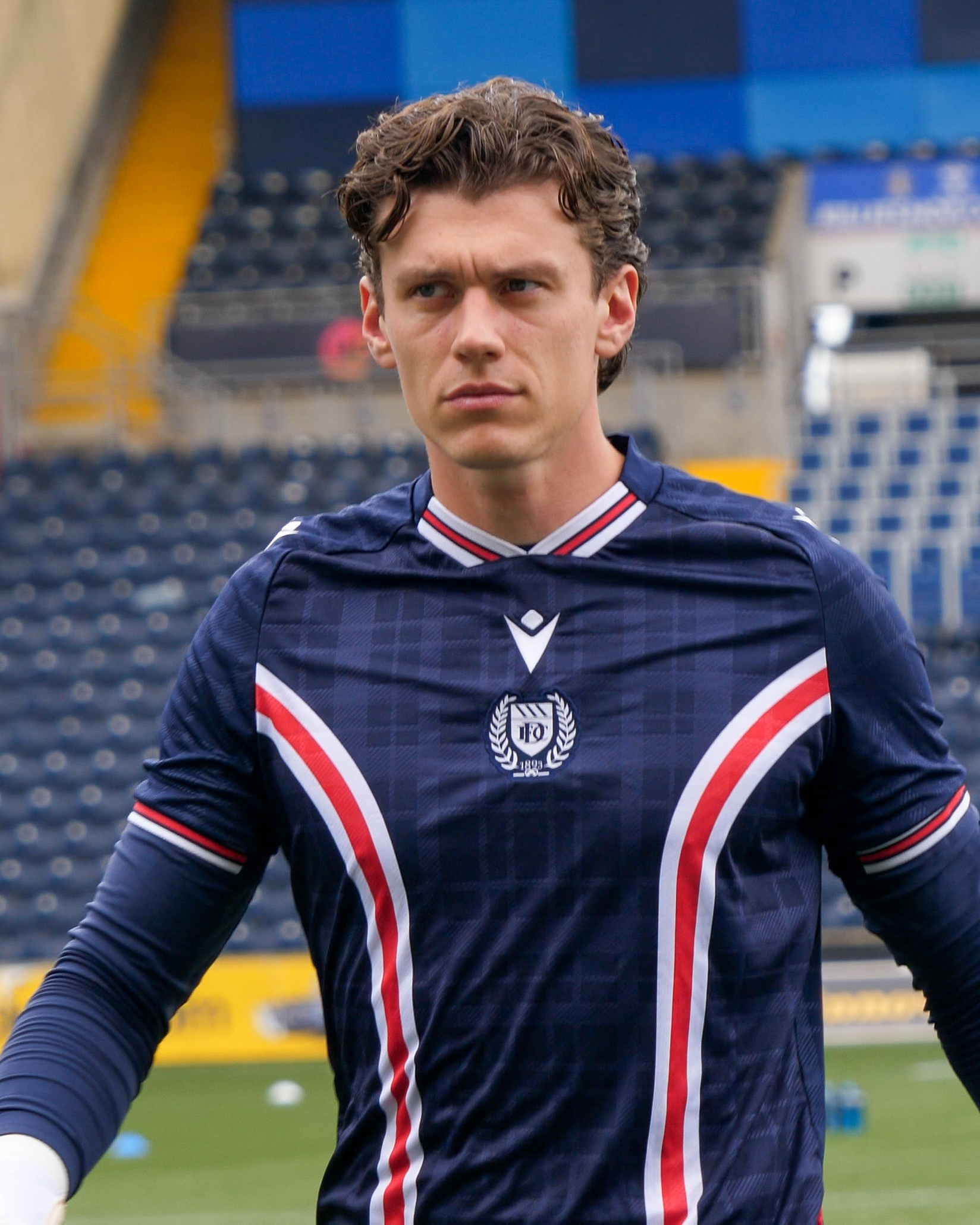
- Jon McCracken during a Dundee warm-up in 2025

Personal information
- Full name: Jon Douglas McCracken
- Date of birth: 24 May 2000 (age 26)
- Place of birth: Motherwell, Lanarkshire, Scotland
- Height: 1.85 m (6 ft 1 in)
- Position: Goalkeeper

Team information
- Current team: Bradford City
- Number: 21

Youth career
- –2016: Hamilton Academical
- 2016–2021: Norwich City

Senior career*
Years	Team	Apps	(Gls)
2021–2024	Norwich City	0	(0)
2022	→ Bohemians (loan)	5	(0)
2023	→ Stevenage (loan)	5	(0)
2023	→ Dundee (loan)	1	(0)
2023	→ Accrington Stanley (loan)	11	(0)
2024	→ Dundee (loan)	11	(0)
2024–2026	Dundee	51	(0)
2026–	Bradford City	12	(0)

International career^{‡}
2017	Scotland U17	6	(0)
- * Club domestic league appearances and goals as of 7 November 2026 (UTC) ‡ National team caps and goals as of 19:34, 2 September 2024 (UTC)

Jon Douglas McCracken (born 24 May 2000) is a Scottish professional footballer who plays as a goalkeeper for EFL League One club Bradford City. He came through the Hamilton Academical and Norwich City academies without playing a competitive first team game for either club. He has since made over 75 competitive first team appearances from loan stints at Bohemians, Stevenage, Dundee (twice) and Accrington Stanley, and then re-joined Dundee as a permanent player in 2024 for two seasons.

McCracken represented Scotland six times at the under-17 level. He received a call up to the senior squad in 2024.

== Club career ==
=== Norwich City ===
McCracken began his career at Hamilton Academical, before signing for Norwich City's academy in 2016. After spending the 2018–19 season playing for Norwich's under-23 team, McCracken went on a one-week trial with Premier League club Burnley in July 2019. No transfer materialised and he remained at Norwich for the 2019–20 season, missing the second half of that season after suffering a stress fracture in his back. He trained with the Norwich first team at the start of the 2020–21 season and was an unused substitute in an EFL Cup match against Luton Town on 5 September 2020. He played in all three of the club's EFL Trophy matches during the season. McCracken agreed a contract extension to remain at Norwich on 22 December 2020, with the new agreement running until July 2022. He signed a further two-year contract extension on 4 March 2022, highlighting a possible loan move in order to gain match-playing experience.

==== Loan to Bohemians ====
Ahead of the 2022–23 season, McCracken trained with National League club Southend United ahead of a proposed season-long loan move. He suffered an injury during the trial and returned to Norwich to receive treatment. McCracken subsequently joined League of Ireland Premier Division club Bohemians on loan on 21 July 2022, on an agreement until 31 December 2022. McCracken kept a clean sheet on his senior debut in a 2–0 away victory against Lucan United in the FAI Cup on 22 August 2022. He provided cover for first choice goalkeeper James Talbot during his time there, making seven appearances in all competitions.

==== Loan to Stevenage ====
McCracken signed for League Two club Stevenage on an emergency loan deal on 10 March 2023. He made his English Football League debut a day later in Stevenage's 3–1 victory against Walsall. McCracken's loan spell was ended after he sustained an ankle injury in a 1–1 away draw with Northampton Town on 1 April 2023. He made five appearances during his time at Stevenage.

==== Loan to Dundee ====
On 3 July 2023, McCracken joined Scottish Premiership club Dundee on a season-long loan. He would make his competitive debut in an away Scottish League Cup group stage win against Bonnyrigg Rose. On 15 August, McCracken had his loan mutually cancelled and returned to his parent club after Norwich sold second-choice goalkeeper Tim Krul.

==== Loan to Accrington Stanley ====
McCracken signed for League Two club Accrington Stanley on a week-long emergency loan deal on 29 September 2023. McCracken would remain with Accrington after having his emergency loan extended. In a league win against Wrexham on 21 November 2023, McCracken was targeted by missiles thrown by the away supporters which delayed the game. On 24 November, McCracken would again have his emergency loan extended by Accrington, but would leave the club at the end of this extension the following week after breaking his arm.

==== Second loan to Dundee ====
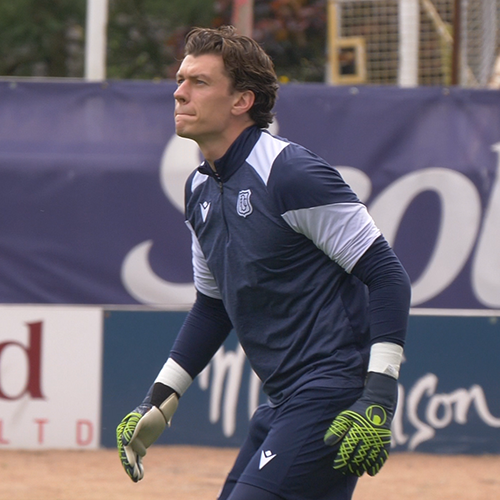
McCracken in 2024

On 1 February 2024, McCracken returned to Scottish Premiership club Dundee on loan until the end of the season while nearing recovery from his broken arm. McCracken made his second debut for Dundee on 2 March, in a home league game against Kilmarnock. He kept his first clean sheet for the Dark Blues on 13 March in a league win at home to Aberdeen. McCracken left Dundee at the end of his loan, and his parent club Norwich City announced in their released list that he would leave the club upon the expiry of his contract.

=== Dundee ===
On 21 June 2024, McCracken returned to Dundee, this time on a non-loan two-year contract. He made 20 Dundee first team appearances from the start of the season until late February, rotated with Trevor Carson. It was in this time McCracken was called up to the senior Scotland squad for the first time. However, from March onwards that season, boss Tony Docherty stuck with Carson as goalkeeper for the remainder of the season. He was mentioned as a possible Scotland squad call up with 5 Scottish goalkeepers injured for the end of season friendly in Liechtenstein. After missing the last few games due to injury, McCracken left Dundee at the end of the season.

=== Bradford City ===
In June 2026 he signed a three-year contract with Bradford City. McCracken started out impressively for the Bantams with four consecutive clean sheets in his first four games, the fourth of which coming in a EFL Cup tie against Championship club Burnley in which Bradford won a penalty shootout in part thanks to another McCracken save.

== International career ==
McCracken made his debut for the Scotland under-17 team in 2017, making six appearances throughout the 2017 UEFA European Under-17 Championship qualification stage.

McCracken was called up by the Scotland national football team in September 2024 for the UEFA Nations League matches against Poland and Portugal after squad member Robby McCrorie pulled out with a hip injury.

== Career statistics ==
As of match played 5 September 2026

Appearances and goals by club, season and competition
Club	Season	League			National Cup (Note: Includes FA Cup and FAI Cup)		League Cup		Other		Total	
Club	Season	Division	Apps	Goals	Apps	Goals	Apps	Goals	Apps	Goals	Apps	Goals
Norwich City U23	2020–21	—			—		—		3 (Note: Appearances in the EFL Trophy)	0	3	0
Norwich City	2020–21	Championship	0	0	0	0	0	0	—		0	0
Norwich City	2021–22	Premier League	0	0	0	0	0	0	—		0	0
Norwich City	2022–23	Championship	0	0	0	0	0	0	—		0	0
Norwich City	2023–24	Championship	0	0	—		0	0	—		0	0
Norwich City	Total		0	0	0	0	0	0	0	0	0	0
Bohemians (loan)	2022	LOI Premier Division	5	0	2	0	—		0	0	7	0
Stevenage (loan)	2022–23	League Two	5	0	—		—		—		5	0
Dundee (loan)	2023–24	Scottish Premiership	12	0	0	0	3	0	0	0	15	0
Accrington Stanley (loan)	2023–24	League Two	11	0	2	0	—		0	0	13	0
Dundee	2024–25	Scottish Premiership	16	0	1	0	3	0	0	0	20	0
Dundee	2025–26	Scottish Premiership	35	0	2	0	2	0	0	0	39	0
Dundee	Total		51	0	3	0	5	0	0	0	59	0
Bradford City	2026–27	League One	5	0	0	0	2	0	0	0	7	0
Career total			89	0	7	0	10	0	3	0	109	0
