= Michael Mellon =

Scottish footballer (born 2003)

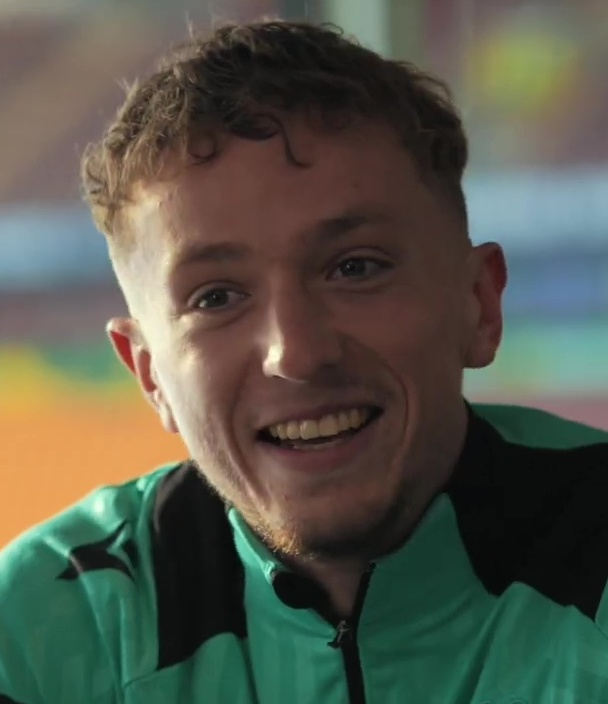

Personal information
- Full name: Michael Jordan Donald Mellon
- Date of birth: 5 December 2003 (age 22)
- Place of birth: Blackpool, England
- Height: 6 ft 1 in (1.85 m)
- Position: Striker

Team information
- Current team: Stevenage
- Number: 28

Youth career
- –2019: Manchester United
- 2019–2022: Burnley

Senior career*
Years	Team	Apps	(Gls)
2022–2026	Burnley	0	(0)
2023	→ Morecambe (loan)	8	(0)
2023–2024	→ Morecambe (loan)	22	(13)
2024	→ Dundee (loan)	14	(3)
2024–2025	→ Stockport County (loan)	2	(0)
2025	→ Bradford City (loan)	15	(2)
2025–2026	→ Oldham Athletic (loan)	16	(7)
2026–	Stevenage	11	(2)

International career^{‡}
2019–2020	Scotland U17	3	(1)
2023–2024	Scotland U21	4	(0)
- * Club domestic league appearances and goals as of 12:26, 22 November 2026 (UTC) ‡ National team caps and goals as of 21:52, 4 June 2024 (UTC)

Michael Jordan Donald Mellon (born 5 December 2003) is a professional footballer who plays as a striker for EFL League One club Stevenage.

Born in England, he is a Scotland youth international.

== Club career ==
Mellon started his career in the academy at Manchester United before he joined Burnley at under-16 level during the summer pre-season of 2019. He featured for Tony Philliskirk's under-18 side for their tour of Prague, where he scored a late equaliser against Turkish side Altınordu on his first appearance. He played several times for the youth team during his first season at the club, before signing a two-year scholarship in July 2020. In February 2022, Mellon agreed his first professional contract, signing a three-and-a-half-year deal until the summer of 2025. Mellon moved on loan to Morecambe in January 2023. Mellon made his senior debut on 24 January 2023 in a League One match away at Ipswich Town at Portman Road, losing 4–0, and his first start on 28 January at home to Bristol Rovers in a 5–1 win. He suffered a shoulder injury in March 2023, ending his season.

He rejoined Morecambe on a season-long loan ahead of the 2023–24 season. He scored the first hat trick of his professional career, in a 4–1 league victory against AFC Wimbledon on 28 October 2023. Following an impressive spell that saw him score fifteen goals in twenty-seven appearances, he was recalled by Burnley on 8 January 2024.

On 26 January 2024, Mellon joined Scottish Premiership club Dundee on loan until the end of the season. He made his debut off the bench the following day, and notched a goal and two assists in an away league victory over Livingston. His performance was praised by Dundee manager Tony Docherty. On 11 February 2024, Mellon suffered a serious head injury in a win over St Johnstone, requiring a stretcher to leave the pitch after falling unconscious. After Mellon was released from hospital, Dundee contacted the Scottish Football Association to ask why play was not stopped during the match. Mellon returned to the pitch on 24 February off the bench away to Hibernian.

On 16 July 2024, Mellon joined EFL League One club Stockport on loan until the end of the season.

On 8 January 2025, he was recalled from Stockport County and sent on loan to Bradford City for the remainder of the season. Bradford City manager Graham Alexander denied that Mellon had been signed as a replacement for striker Andy Cook, who had been ruled out injured for the season the day before. By the end of the month Mellon had failed to appear for the club. After 2 substitute appearances, he made his first start for the club in February 2025, and was praised for his performance by Alexander. He scored his first goal for the club on 1 March 2025, a late winning goal in a 2–1 win away at Salford.

On 1 September 2025, Mellon signed for League Two club Oldham Athletic on a season-long loan, joining father Micky at the club. He suffered an injury in December 2025, which ended his season, although he remained on loan at Oldham until the end of his loan contract.

In August 2026, he signed for Stevenage for an undisclosed fee.

== International career ==
Mellon scored his first international goal for the Scotland under-17 team against the Sweden under-17 team on 10 February 2020.

He was called up by the Scotland under-21 team in September 2023, and he appeared as a substitute in a 3–1 win against Hungary on 13 October.

== Personal life ==
His father is Micky Mellon.

== Style of play ==
He has been described as "a physical striker capable of playing with his back to goal and with fine scoring instincts".

== Career statistics ==
As of match played 21 November 2026

Appearances and goals by club, season and competition
Club	Season	League			FA Cup		EFL Cup		Other		Total	
Club	Season	Division	Apps	Goals	Apps	Goals	Apps	Goals	Apps	Goals	Apps	Goals
Burnley	2022–23	Championship	0	0	0	0	0	0	—		0	0
Burnley	2023–24	Premier League	0	0	0	0	0	0	—		0	0
Burnley	2024–25	Championship	0	0	0	0	0	0	—		0	0
Burnley	2025–26	Premier League	0	0	0	0	0	0	—		0	0
Burnley	Total		0	0	0	0	0	0	0	0	0	0
Morecambe (loan)	2022–23	League One	8	0	0	0	0	0	0	0	8	0
Morecambe (loan)	2023–24	League Two	22	13	3	1	1	1	1 (Note: Appearance(s) in EFL Trophy)	0	27	15
Dundee (loan)	2023–24	Scottish Premiership	14	3	0	0	0	0	0	0	14	3
Stockport County (loan)	2024–25	League One	2	0	1	0	0	0	1	0	4	0
Bradford City (loan)	2024–25	League Two	15	2	0	0	0	0	0	0	15	2
Oldham Athletic (loan)	2025–26	League Two	16	7	2	3	0	0	0	0	18	10
Stevenage	2026–27	League One	11	2	1	0	1	0	2	5	15	7
Career total			88	27	7	4	2	1	4	5	101	37
