= Trevor Carson =

Northern Irish former footballer (born 1988)

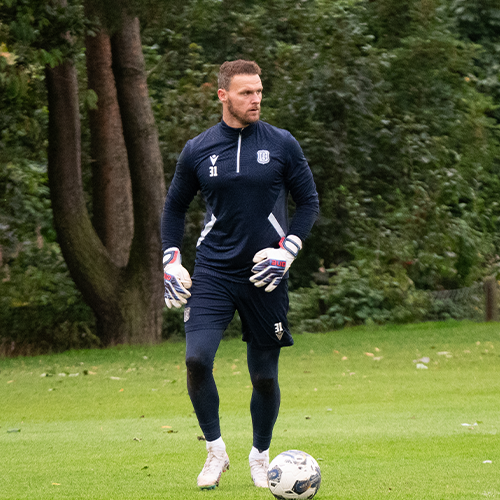
- Carson training with Dundee in 2023

Personal information
- Full name: Trevor Carson
- Date of birth: 5 March 1988 (age 38)
- Place of birth: Killyleagh, Northern Ireland
- Height: 1.83 m (6 ft 0 in)
- Position: Goalkeeper

Youth career
- Killyleagh Boys
- 2004–2007: Sunderland

Senior career*
Years	Team	Apps	(Gls)
2007–2012	Sunderland	0	(0)
2008–2009	→ Chesterfield (loan)	18	(0)
2011	→ Lincoln City (loan)	16	(0)
2011	→ Brentford (loan)	1	(0)
2011	→ Bury (loan)	8	(0)
2012	→ Hull City (loan)	0	(0)
2012	→ Bury (loan)	9	(0)
2012–2014	Bury	44	(0)
2013–2014	→ Portsmouth (loan)	37	(0)
2014–2015	Cheltenham Town	46	(0)
2015–2017	Hartlepool United	57	(0)
2017–2021	Motherwell	57	(0)
2021–2022	Dundee United	4	(0)
2022	→ Morecambe (loan)	21	(0)
2022–2023	St Mirren	37	(0)
2023–2026	Dundee	47	(0)
2025–2026	→ Ross County (loan)	29	(0)
2026	Queen of the South	0	(0)
Total		431	(0)

International career
	Northern Ireland U17	8	(0)
	Northern Ireland U18	2	(0)
	Northern Ireland U19	9	(0)
	Northern Ireland U20	2	(0)
2006–2009	Northern Ireland U21	15	(0)
2009	Northern Ireland B	1	(0)
2018–2020	Northern Ireland	8	(0)
- * Club domestic league appearances and goals

Trevor Carson (born 5 March 1988) is a Northern Irish former professional footballer who played as a goalkeeper.

Born in Killyleagh, Northern Ireland, Carson started his youth career with Killyleagh Boys before moving to Sunderland in 2004. He signed his first professional contract with Sunderland in 2006 before several loan spells at Chesterfield, Lincoln City, Brentford, Bury and Hull City. He was released by Sunderland in 2012, re-joining Bury permanently. After two seasons with Bury, as well as a loan spell with Portsmouth, Carson signed for Cheltenham Town. Carson suffered relegation with Cheltenham despite winning the Player of the Year award. Subsequently, Carson would have a successful two seasons with Hartlepool United. He won the club's Player of the Year award with Hartlepool in his first season but was relegated in his second season. In 2017, Carson moved to Scotland, signing for Motherwell for an undisclosed fee. He spent four seasons with Motherwell, before shorter spells with Dundee United, Morecambe and St Mirren. In 2023, Carson joined Dundee on a three-year deal spent the last year on loan with Ross County. He signed on as a player-coach for Queen of the South but retired shortly after due to recurring injuries.

Carson has represented Northern Ireland at senior and youth level. He received his first senior call up in 2010, but made his Northern Ireland debut in 2018. In total, he has been capped 8 times for the national side.

== Club career ==
=== Sunderland ===
Born in Downpatrick, Northern Ireland, Carson began his football career at Killyleagh Boys before he joined Sunderland in 2004. He then progressed the ranks at the club's youth system. Carson then became a backup to fellow teenager Ben Alnwick for the final three games of the campaign. As a result, he signed professional terms with Sunderland and then signed a one–year contract extension the following year.

Ahead of the 2006–07 season, Carson made his Sunderland debut on 16 July 2006 in a friendly match, coming on as an 80th-minute substitute, in a 2–0 win against Rotherham United. He continued to remain as the club's backup goalkeeper behind Alnwick and then Darren Ward. At one point, Carson missed one match, due to family bereavement.

He made his debut for Sunderland on 16 July, against Darlington in a 4–0 win. Later that year, with Craig Gordon out through injury, manager Steve Bruce urged Carson to push Márton Fülöp for the No.1 spot in the squad. He signed a new contract with Sunderland on 22 October 2009 which would keep him at the Stadium of Light until 2012. Throughout his Sunderland career, Carson continuously remained as the club's backup goalkeeper.

However, in the 2010–11 season, Carson suffered a shoulder injury during Sunderland's pre–season tour and saw him sidelined for several months. After showing promise at Sunderland, he was released by the Premier League club on 19 May 2012.

==== Loan spells from Sunderland ====
On 14 August 2008, Carson joined Chesterfield on a season-long loan deal. He made his professional début in a 1–0 victory against Grimsby Town keeping a clean sheet on 23 August 2008. Since making his debut for the club, Carson quickly established himself in the starting eleven, becoming Chesterfield's first choice goalkeeper. This lasted until he was dropped in favour of Tommy Lee. As a result, Carson was recalled by Sunderland early in January 2009 after a shortage of keepers due to injuries.

Carson was loaned out to Lincoln City on 20 January 2011 until the end of the season. Two days later on 22 January 2011, he made his debut for the club against Stockport County in a 4–3 win. Since joining Lincoln City, Carson quickly established himself in the first team as the club's first choice goalkeeper. As a result, he had loan spell with the club extended until on 23 April 2011. This lasted until Carson was recalled by his parent club, in which he said it was a risky move.

It was announced on 24 March 2011 that Carson joined Brentford on loan until the rest of the 2010–11 season. He made his only appearances for the club, coming against Sheffield Wednesday five days later on 29 March 2011. However, Carson suffered a knee injury that saw him out for the remaining Brentford's matches. He was then recalled by the club on 21 April 2011.

It was announced on 12 September 2011 that Carson was loaned out to Bury on a two-month loan deal. The following day, he made his debut for the club, starting the whole game, in a 1–0 loss against Chesterfield. Since joining Bury, Carson quickly established as the club's first choice goalkeeper. However, on 3 November 2011, Carson was recalled by his parent club, in which he made eight appearances in all competitions for the side.

It wasn't until on 13 January 2012 when Carson was loaned out again to Hull City for a month. However, he never made an appearance for the club, appearing as an unused substitute before returning to his parent club a month later.

Shortly after leaving Hull City, Carson was loaned out to Bury on a month loan. He made his second debut for the club, starting the whole game, in a 1–1 draw against Leyton Orient on 25 February 2012. Since joining Bury for the second time, Carson continued to regain his first choice goalkeeper role until he left the club on 1 April 2012. By the time Carson left Bury, he made 17 appearances over two loan spells either side of his time at Hull.

=== Bury ===
On 22 May 2012 it was announced that Bury had completed the signing of Carson on a two-year contract after impressing on loan. Upon joining the club, he was given a number one shirt for the side.

Carson's first game after signing for the club on a permanent basis came on 11 August 2012, starting the whole game, in a 2–1 loss against Middlesbrough in the first round of the League Cup. Since joining Bury, he quickly established as the club's first choice goalkeeper. Carson then captained Bury for the first time in his career, as the club drew 2–2 against Coventry City on 25 August 2012. He helped the club keep two consecutive clean sheets in two matches between 26 January 2013 and 2 February 2013 against Shrewsbury Town and Doncaster Rovers. However, Carson suffered a hand injury but continued to start in goal with a fractured hand, in a 2–2 draw against Brentford on 9 February 2013. In late–March, Manager Kevin Blackwell dropped him in favour of Cameron Belford. To make matters, Carson suffered injuries that saw him sidelined for the rest of the season. Bury was later relegated to the fourth tier (EFL League Two). In his first season at Gigg Lane, he made forty–five appearances in all competitions (thirty–nine were league appearances).

At the start of the 2013–14 season, Carson lost his first choice goalkeeper role after Manager Blackwell signed Brian Jensen, Rob Lainton and Reice Charles-Cook. Having appeared on the substitute bench, he made his first appearance of the season, starting the whole game, in a 4–1 win against Cheltenham Town on 31 August 2013. As a result, Carson was told by Blackwell that he can leave the club. By the time Carson was loaned out, he made a total of five appearances for the side. At the end of the 2013–14 season, Carson was released by Bury on 30 April 2014.

==== Portsmouth (loan) ====
On 3 October 2013, Carson joined Portsmouth in a three-month loan deal.

He made his debut for the club in a league match against Rochdale kept a clean sheet in a 3–0 victory. After the match, he was happy to make his Portsmouth debut by having a win and a clean sheet. Since making his debut for the club, he established himself as number one ahead of John Sullivan and Phil Smith. Carson set himself up to be signed up permanently in January 2014, when he outlined that he was keen to stay at the South Coast club. Carson helped Portsmouth keep two consecutive clean sheets between 26 December 2013 and 29 December 2013 against Dagenham & Redbridge and Northampton Town. Shortly, he had his loan spell with the club extended until the end of the season. Carson, once again, helped Portsmouth keep four consecutive clean sheets between 25 February 2014 and 11 March 2014. Having previously did not play against his parent club, Bury, Carson eventually started in goal against the club, as Portsmouth drew 4–4 on 26 April 2014. At the end of the 2013–14 season, he went on to make thirty–nine appearances in all competitions.

Following this, Carson returned to Bury when the season was concluded. Once he was released by Bury, there were speculation on whether Portsmouth would make a move to sign him on a permanent basis. However, the club did not make an effort to sign Carson, as Manager Andy Awford opted to sign Paul Jones and Michael Poke instead. Two years after leaving Portsmouth, he spoke about his fondness on the club.

=== Cheltenham Town ===
On 30 June 2014, Carson joined Cheltenham Town on a free transfer after his release from Bury. Upon the club, he was given a number one shirt.

Carson made his Cheltenham Town debut, starting the whole game, against Bury, and kept a clean sheet, in a 1–0 win. After the match, he was named Football League's Team of the Week. In a follow–up match against Brighton & Hove Albion in the first round of the League Cup, Carson captained the club for the first time in his career, as they lost 2–0. In a match against Accrington Stanley, Carson played an important role when he set up a goal for Koby Arthur, who scored a winning goal, in a 2–1 win. His performance, along with his five clean sheets, earned him August's Player of the Month but lost out to Matt Tubbs. He, once again, captained Cheltenham Town on two occasions, coming against Cambridge United on 21 October 2014 and then against Swindon Town on 8 November 2014. However, Carson was unable to help the club avoid relegation to the National League following a 1–0 loss against Shrewsbury Town on 25 April 2015. At the end of the 2014–15 season, he went on to make fifty–one appearances in all competitions.

For his performance, Carson was awarded the club's Player of the Year.

=== Hartlepool United ===
On 15 June 2015, Carson signed for Hartlepool United for an undisclosed fee. Upon joining the club, he was given a number one shirt. Carson later said his move to Hartlepool United was to be closer to his family.

He was initially expected to be the club's first choice goalkeeper ahead of new signing, Adam Bartlett but suffered a toe injury while training and was sidelined for months. By October, Carson made a return to the substitute bench for a match against Luton Town. It wasn't until on 17 October 2015 when he made his Hartlepool United debut, starting the whole game and kept a clean sheet, in a 1–0 win against Dagenham & Redbridge. Since making his debut for the club, Carson quickly became a first choice goalkeeper, dispatching a place from Bartlett. His performances earned him praise from Manager Ronnie Moore. He then helped Hartlepool United keep four consecutive clean sheets between 15 March 2016 and 28 March 2016. On 16 April 2016, Carson signed a contract extension with the club, keeping him until 2019. He later helped Hartlepool United finish sixteenth place in the league. Despite being sidelined at the start of the season, Carson was awarded Hartlepool United's Player of the Year and Hartlepool Mail Player of the Year. He was also awarded The Northern Echo's North-East Team of the Season. At the end of the 2015–16 season, Carson went on to make thirty–eight appearances in all competitions.

At the start of the 2016–17 season, Carson continued to remain as Hartlepool United's first choice goalkeeper. Along the way, he missed two matches, due to being on international duty. On 12 November 2016, less than 24 hours after being included in the Northern Ireland squad against Azerbaijan, Carson started in goal against Cheltenham Town but suffered an injury that saw him substituted in the 37th minute. This resulted in him preventing from making his debut for the national team against Croatia. But he made a quick recovery and returned to the starting line–up against Doncaster Rovers on 19 November 2016, resulting in the club losing 2–1. Carson wrote a columns on the club's Match Programme, expressing his embarrassment on Hartlepool United's woeful defensive record. However, he suffered a shoulder injury that resulted in him being sidelined for the rest of the season. But in mid–April, Carson recovered from his shoulder injury and returned to training. He then made his return to the starting line–up against Cheltenham Town on 29 April 2017, as the club lost 1–0. In the last game of the season, Carson started in goal against Doncaster Rovers, which a win must ensure Hartlepool United's stay in League Two if Newport County lose. Despite winning 2–1, the club, however, were relegated after Newport County avoided relegation following their win against Notts County. At the end of the 2016–17 season, he went on to make twenty–five appearances in all competitions.

Following this, it was expected that Carson would be leaving Hartlepool United as a result of their relegation.

=== Motherwell ===
On 6 June 2017, Carson joined Motherwell for an undisclosed fee from Hartlepool United, on a three-year contract. Upon joining the club, he was given the '1' squad number.

Carson made his Motherwell debut in a 2–1 loss against Rangers in the opening game of the season. In the following match against St Johnstone, he was sent–off in the 63rd minute for handling outside his area, as the club lost 4–1. After serving a one match suspension, Carson returned to the starting line–up against Heart of Midlothian on 26 August 2017, in a 2–1 win. After returning from suspension, he regained his place as Motherwell's first choice goalkeeper in his first season. Carson helped the club beat Rangers 2–0 in the semi–finals of the Scottish League Cup. He started in goal for the 2017 Scottish League Cup final as Motherwell lost 2–0 against Celtic. In early December, Carson suffered a knee injury that saw him out for two weeks. He returned to the starting line–up against Dundee on 23 December 2017, as Motherwell drew 1–1. The following month saw him linked with a move to Celtic, but the club twice rejected a bid for him. He helped Motherwell to reach the 2018 Scottish Cup final after beating Aberdeen 3–0; he started in the final, as the club lost 2–0 to Celtic at Hampden Park for the second occasion that season. By the end of the 2017–18 season, he made forty–six appearances in all competitions, keeping a total of 18 clean sheets.

At the start of the 2018–19 season, Carson continued to keep his jersey as Motherwell's first choice goalkeeper. However, during a 1–0 loss against Hearts on 15 September 2018, he suffered ankle injury following a collision with Uche Ikpeazu and was substituted in the 31st minute. Carson made a quick recovery and returned to the starting line–up against Aberdeen just days later, losing 1–0. He was replaced by Mark Gillespie after a 7–1 defeat to Rangers in November 2018, which coincided with him developing deep vein thrombosis in his shoulder and lung, a life-threatening condition for someone in a contact sport. He returned to fitness in May 2019, but was now second-choice in the squad. He went on to make seventeen appearances in all competitions in the 2018–19 season.

On 7 January 2020, at that time still backup to Gillespie, Carson signed a new two-and-a-half-year contract keeping him at Fir Park until 2022. He continued to remain as a backup until the season was curtailed on 18 May 2020, due to COVID-19 pandemic, with Motherwell finishing in third place in the league.

When Gillespie moved on to Newcastle United in the summer of 2020, Carson regained the starting place and played his first match in twenty months on 3 August 2020 in a 1–0 loss against Ross County, and was also named as the club's vice-captain. He then started in a 2020–21 UEFA Europa League tie against Northern Irish club Coleraine (the first senior club match he had played in his homeland): he conceded two goals from penalties during the match which finished 2–2, but then made a 'hat-trick' of saves from kicks in the resultant shootout which Motherwell won 3–0 to progress in the tournament. However, in October 2020, he suffered a knee injury that required surgery. Up until then, Carson kept four clean sheets for the side, including two in succession.

=== Dundee United ===
Dundee United confirmed the signing of Carson on 8 July 2021 on a two-year contract.

==== Morecambe (loan) ====
On 5 January 2022, Carson rejoined former Motherwell boss Stephen Robinson after joining EFL League One side Morecambe on loan for the remainder of the season.

=== St Mirren ===
On 25 May 2022, it was confirmed that Carson would join St Mirren on a two-year deal for an undisclosed fee. In March 2023, he signed a contract extension keeping him at The Saints until the end of the 2024/25 season.

=== Dundee ===
On 2 August 2023, Dundee announced the signing of Carson on a three-year deal, for an undisclosed fee. Carson made his debut for the Dee in the league away to his former club St Mirren.

In his second season, he spent time out injured and subsequently lost his place to Jon McCracken, before making his first league start of the season on 20 October 2024 against former club Motherwell. Dundee manager Tony Docherty has since rotated between Carson and McCracken for a starting berth. In a high point of his Dundee spell, Carson earned a place in the SPFL's Team of the Week on 20 January 2025 after an impressive performance and clean sheet in a Scottish Cup victory over Dundee derby rivals and Carson's former team Dundee United, Dundee's first clean sheet derby win in over 20 years.

==== Ross County (loan) ====
After being replaced by Jon McCracken as Dundee's starting keeper, Carson joined Scottish Championship club Ross County on a season-long loan deal on 25 September 2025, re-joining his previous Dundee manager and new County manager Tony Docherty. After the end of the season which finished with County being relegated, Carson departed Dundee at the end of his contract.

=== Queen of the South and retirement ===
On 18 June 2026, Carson joined Scottish League One club Queen of the South as a player-coach under new manager Nicky Clark. However, issues arising from a knee injury led to Carson leaving the club on 12 July and announcing his retirement from playing.

== International career ==
=== Youth career ===
Carson represented Northern Ireland up to the U21 levels and was first called up for the Northern Ireland U17 in 2004. He later played eight times for the U17 side, including the UEFA European Under-17 Championship. Carson was then called up for the Northern Ireland U18, Northern Ireland U19 and Northern Ireland U20.

In November 2006, Carson was called up to the Northern Ireland U21 squad for the first time. He was then called up to the U21 squad for the next three years. Carson played two games in two days when appearing for Northern Ireland U21s in Wuppertal, Germany on 5 September 2008, with his side losing 3–0, before making a dash back to Chesterfield to play in a 1–0 win over Rotherham United.

Carson then represented Northern Ireland B in a 3–0 defeat against Scotland B in May 2009.

=== Senior career ===
In February 2010, Carson was called up to the Northern Ireland and appeared as unused substitute against Albania on 3 March 2010. The next eight years saw him being called up to the national team, only to appear as an unused substitute and injuries concern prevented the player from making his debut.

In January 2013 he was called up to the full Northern Ireland squad for their game with Malta, but was forced to withdraw with a broken finger. In May 2015 he was called up again for a friendly against Romania. Due to his performance at Hartlepool United, it was reported that Carson was considered to be in the squad for the UEFA Euro 2016. However, he failed to make the cut.

Carson finally made his international debut on 24 March 2018, against South Korea at Windsor Park. He later appeared four times by the end of the year, including keeping two clean sheets. After not playing for two years, Carson started in goal against Norway on 14 October 2020, as Northern Ireland lost 5–1 in the UEFA Nations League match.

== Personal life ==
Carson is engaged to Rachel. In November 2012, he became a first time father when his daughter was born from a previous relationship. In July 2018, Carson then became a second time father.

Carson comes from a family of seven. He has four brothers and two sisters and revealed that his grandad and his father, who both had been goalkeepers themselves, were a major influence on him becoming a goalkeeper.

In June 2016, Carson set up an online charity appeal by taking part in the Warrior Beach Assault 10k obstacle course in Whitley Bay for his sister in law, Melanie Hartshorn, who is suffering from a rare condition known as Ehlors Danlos Syndrome. In November 2018, Carson was diagnosed with deep vein thrombosis after doctors had initially told him they were "90% sure" that he had cancer. In June 2020, Carson revealed that he battled mental health issues for three years since leaving Hartlepool United. In May 2023, Carson admitted to having a gambling addiction in the past.

== Career statistics ==
As of match played 1 May 2026

Appearances and goals by club, season and competition
Club	Season	League			National Cup		League Cup		Other		Total	
Club	Season	Division	Apps	Goals	Apps	Goals	Apps	Goals	Apps	Goals	Apps	Goals
Sunderland	2008–09	Premier League	0	0	0	0	0	0	0	0	0	0
Sunderland	2009–10	Premier League	0	0	0	0	0	0	0	0	0	0
Sunderland	2010–11	Premier League	0	0	0	0	0	0	0	0	0	0
Sunderland	2011–12	Premier League	0	0	0	0	0	0	0	0	0	0
Sunderland	Total		0	0	0	0	0	0	0	0	0	0
Chesterfield (loan)	2008–09	League Two	18	0	2	0	0	0	0	0	20	0
Lincoln City (loan)	2010–11	League Two	16	0	0	0	0	0	0	0	16	0
Brentford (loan)	2010–11	League One	1	0	0	0	0	0	0	0	1	0
Bury (loan)	2011–12	League One	17	0	0	0	0	0	0	0	17	0
Hull City (loan)	2011–12	Championship	0	0	0	0	0	0	0	0	0	0
Bury	2012–13	League One	39	0	3	0	1	0	2 (Note: Appearances in Football League Trophy)	0	45	0
Bury	2013–14	League Two	5	0	0	0	0	0	0	0	5	0
Bury	Total		44	0	3	0	1	0	2	0	50	0
Portsmouth (loan)	2013–14	League Two	36	0	1	0	0	0	2	0	39	0
Cheltenham Town	2014–15	League Two	46	0	2	0	1	0	2	0	51	0
Hartlepool United	2015–16	League Two	34	0	4	0	0	0	0	0	38	0
Hartlepool United	2016–17	League Two	23	0	2	0	0	0	0	0	25	0
Hartlepool United	Total		57	0	6	0	0	0	0	0	63	0
Motherwell	2017–18	Scottish Premiership	33	0	5	0	8	0	0	0	46	0
Motherwell	2018–19	Scottish Premiership	12	0	0	0	5	0	0	0	17	0
Motherwell	2019–20	Scottish Premiership	0	0	0	0	0	0	0	0	0	0
Motherwell	2020–21	Scottish Premiership	12	0	0	0	0	0	3 (Note: Appearances in UEFA Europa League)	0	15	0
Motherwell	Total		57	0	5	0	13	0	3	0	78	0
Dundee United	2021–22	Scottish Premiership	4	0	0	0	1	0	0	0	5	0
Morecambe (loan)	2021–22	League One	21	0	1	0	0	0	0	0	22	0
St Mirren	2022–23	Scottish Premiership	37	0	2	0	1	0	0	0	40	0
Dundee	2023–24	Scottish Premiership	25	0	0	0	0	0	0	0	25	0
Dundee	2024–25	Scottish Premiership	22	0	2	0	3	0	0	0	27	0
Dundee	2025–26	Scottish Premiership	0	0	0	0	2	0	0	0	2	0
Dundee	Total		47	0	2	0	5	0	0	0	54	0
Ross County (loan)	2025–26	Scottish Championship	29	0	1	0	0	0	0	0	30	0
Career total			431	0	25	0	22	0	9	0	487	0

== Honours ==
Brentford

- Football League Trophy runner-up: 2010–11

Motherwell

- Scottish Cup runner-up: 2017–18
- Scottish League Cup runner-up: 2017–18

Individual

- Cheltenham Town Supporters' Player of the Year: 2014–15
- Hartlepool United Players' Player of the Year 2015–16
- Hartlepool United Supporters' Player of the Year 2015–16
- Hartlepool United Community Player of the Year 2015–16
- Motherwell Player of the Year: 2017–18
- Motherwell Players' Player of the Year: 2017–18
- Well Society Player of the Year: 2017–18
