= Jordan McGhee =

Scottish footballer (born 1996)

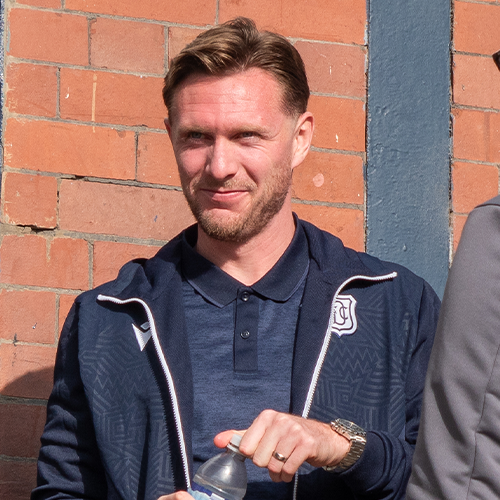
- McGhee in 2024

Personal information
- Date of birth: 24 July 1996 (age 30)
- Place of birth: East Kilbride, Scotland
- Position: Utility player

Team information
- Current team: Motherwell
- Number: 6

Youth career
- 2007–2013: Heart of Midlothian

Senior career*
Years	Team	Apps	(Gls)
2013–2017	Heart of Midlothian	58	(3)
2016–2017	→ Middlesbrough (loan)	0	(0)
2017–2019	Falkirk	65	(6)
2019–2025	Dundee	158	(17)
2025–	Motherwell	7	(0)

International career^{‡}
2011	Scotland U15	2	(0)
2011–2012	Scotland U16	9	(1)
2013	Scotland U18	1	(1)
2013–2017	Scotland U21	20	(0)
- * Club domestic league appearances and goals as of 15:32, 4 May 2026 (UTC) ‡ National team caps and goals as of 4 March 2019

Jordan McGhee (born 24 July 1996) is a Scottish professional footballer who currently plays for Scottish Premiership club Motherwell. He can play as either a defender, both as a centre-back and full back, or as a midfielder. He began his career at Heart of Midlothian and had a spell on loan at Middlesbrough. He then spent two years at Falkirk, and was team captain from January 2019 until his departure in the summer of that year for Dundee. McGhee spent 6 years at the Dee, earning two promotions to the Scottish Premiership and a top six finish in nearly 200 appearances before leaving the club in 2025.

== Club career ==
=== Heart of Midlothian ===
McGhee signed for Heart of Midlothian (Hearts) in 2007, having previously played for Claremont Boys Club. In July 2012, he signed a three-year professional contract, tying him to the club until 2015. A member of the club's under-20 squad McGhee made his first team debut aged 16, on 4 May 2013, coming on as an 86th-minute substitute at Tynecastle in a Scottish Premier League match against St Mirren, replacing Mehdi Taouil in a 3–0 win. The following season on 24 August 2013, in only his second substitute appearance, he scored his first professional goal, an 88th-minute winner in a 2–1 win over Aberdeen in the Scottish Premiership. The following week he made his first start against Inverness Caledonian Thistle, in a 2–0 defeat.

In January 2015, McGhee signed a contract with Hearts that was due to run until the end of the 2016–17 season. Ipswich Town made two offers of around £250,000 for McGhee in August 2015, but these were both rejected by Hearts.

In January 2016 McGhee almost moved to Middlesbrough on loan but the move collapsed after paperwork failed to be completed in time. In July 2016, Middlesbrough returned to sign McGhee on a season-long loan to play in the club's development team.

=== Falkirk ===
McGhee moved to Scottish Championship club Falkirk in August 2017 for an undisclosed transfer fee. He made his debut two days later on 2 September 2017, starting at centre-back as his new side defeated Sligo Rovers in the Challenge Cup 2–1. McGhee was named as team captain in January 2019. Despite the team's best efforts, the Bairns were relegated to the Scottish League One at the end of the 2018–19 season.

=== Dundee ===
==== 2019–20 season ====
In June 2019, McGhee signed a two-year deal with Dundee, who had been relegated to the Championship the previous season. McGhee became a key figure for the Dark Blues, impressing in a variety of different positions, scoring two important goals in consecutive games, and playing in every game until getting surgery on his hand in February 2020, which sidelined him for a couple of weeks. McGhee would be voted by his teammates as Dundee's Player's Player of the Year at the end of the season. At the beginning of July, McGhee would be announced as team captain.

==== 2020–21 season ====
In his second season with Dundee, McGhee would be employed further up the pitch as a box-to-box midfielder by manager James McPake and would find success in this role. In January 2021, McGhee signed a two-year extension with Dundee, keeping him at the club until 2023. Later that month, McGhee would suffer a torn pectoral muscle that would require surgery and looked likely to have ended his season. He would make his return in April however, having recovered quicker than expected, and started in a game away to Dunfermline Athletic immediately upon returning to the squad. McGhee's return was a big factor in Dundee's upturn in form, and he would score 3 vital goals in the Premiership play-offs to help Dundee gain promotion to the Premiership.

==== 2021–22 season ====
During the 2021–22 season, McGhee would require minor surgery to fix a persistent knee issue, which would sideline him for several weeks. Throughout the season he would return to his usual centre back role under McPake and Mark McGhee, and play his most games for the club in a single season yet, though this would not be enough to avoid relegation and a return to the Championship.

==== 2022–23 season ====
McGhee would miss the start of the 2022–23 season with an Achilles injury. He would make his first appearance of the season on 20 August 2022, coming off the bench away to Greenock Morton. During the season he would once again be used largely as a midfielder by new manager Gary Bowyer. McGhee would mark his 100th appearance for Dundee with a clean sheet in an away victory over Hamilton Academical. McGhee would have a successful season in midfield, but after an injury late in a win against Raith Rovers in April 2023, McGhee would be out for the rest of the season with knee ligament damage. McGhee would lift silverware at the end of the season as Dundee would win the Scottish Championship title on the last day away to Queens Park.

==== 2023–24 season ====
On 10 June 2023, Dundee announced that McGhee had signed a new two-year deal with the club, keeping him there until the summer of 2025. McGhee played his 150th game with the Dark Blues on 23 January 2024, in a comfortable away win over Livingston. Under Tony Docherty, McGhee played largely at centre back in a back 3 early on before cementing a role at right wing back, and bagged a trio of goals early on in 2024, including a late winner against local rivals St Johnstone. McGhee's purple patch was stopped by a calf injury sidelining him for several weeks, before returning off the bench in another win over St Johnstone.

==== 2024–25 season ====
Returning to his traditional place at centre back, McGhee scored his first goal of the season on 17 August 2024 in a dominant League Cup knockout victory over Airdrieonians. After being out with an injury, McGhee returned to playing in November, and came off the bench on his return to score in Dundee's comeback victory over Kilmarnock. On 16 March 2025, McGhee scored two goals against Dundee United in Dundee's first derby victory at Tannadice in over twenty years. At the end of the season, after BBC Sport reported in January 2025 that McGhee had signed a pre-contract agreement with fellow Scottish Premiership side Motherwell, Dundee confirmed that McGhee was leaving the club under freedom of contract.

=== Motherwell ===
On 2 June 2025, Motherwell officially announced the signing of McGhee on a two-year deal.

== International career ==
McGhee earned caps at under-15, under-16 and under-18 level before earning a call up to the Scotland under-21 squad aged just 17 after some impressive performances for Hearts.

After establishing himself as a regular at centre back alongside Stuart Findlay, he captained the Scotland under-21 side for the first time in a friendly against Switzerland on 18 November 2014 which ended in a 1–1 draw.

== Career statistics ==
As of match played 26 April 2026

Appearances and goals by club, season and competition
Club	Season	League			National Cup		League Cup		Other		Total	
Club	Season	Division	Apps	Goals	Apps	Goals	Apps	Goals	Apps	Goals	Apps	Goals
Heart of Midlothian	2012–13	Scottish Premier League	1	0	0	0	0	0	0	0	1	0
Heart of Midlothian	2013–14	Scottish Premiership	17	1	1	0	2	0	—		20	1
Heart of Midlothian	2014–15	Scottish Championship	18	2	0	0	1	0	2 (Note: Appearances in the Scottish Challenge Cup)	0	21	2
Heart of Midlothian	2015–16	Scottish Premiership	22	0	3	0	3	1	—		28	1
Heart of Midlothian	2016–17	Scottish Premiership	0	0	0	0	0	0	0	0	0	0
Heart of Midlothian	2017–18	Scottish Premiership	0	0	0	0	3	0	—		3	0
Heart of Midlothian	Total		58	3	4	0	9	1	2	0	73	4
Falkirk	2017–18	Scottish Championship	32	2	3	0	3	0	3	0	41	2
Falkirk	2018–19	Scottish Championship	33	4	1	0	3	0	1	0	38	4
Falkirk	Total		65	6	4	0	6	0	4	0	79	6
Dundee	2019–20	Scottish Championship	24	2	1	0	4	0	1	0	30	2
Dundee	2020–21	Scottish Championship	15	2	0	0	3	0	4 (Note: Appearances in the Premiership play-offs)	3	22	5
Dundee	2021–22	Scottish Premiership	34	1	3	0	4	0	—		41	1
Dundee	2022–23	Scottish Championship	29	3	2	0	2	0	3	0	36	3
Dundee	2023–24	Scottish Premiership	33	5	1	0	3	0	—		37	5
Dundee	2024–25	Scottish Premiership	23	4	2	0	6	1	0	0	31	5
Dundee	Total		158	17	9	0	22	1	8	3	197	21
Motherwell	2025–26	Scottish Premiership	7	0	1	0	0	0	0	0	8	0
Career total			288	25	18	0	37	2	14	3	357	31

== Honours ==
=== Club ===
Heart of Midlothian

- Scottish Championship: 2014–15

Dundee

- Scottish Premiership play-offs: 2020–21
- Scottish Championship: 2022–23

=== Individual ===
Dundee

- Players' Player of the Year: 2019–20
