= Kieran Morgan =

English footballer (born 2006)

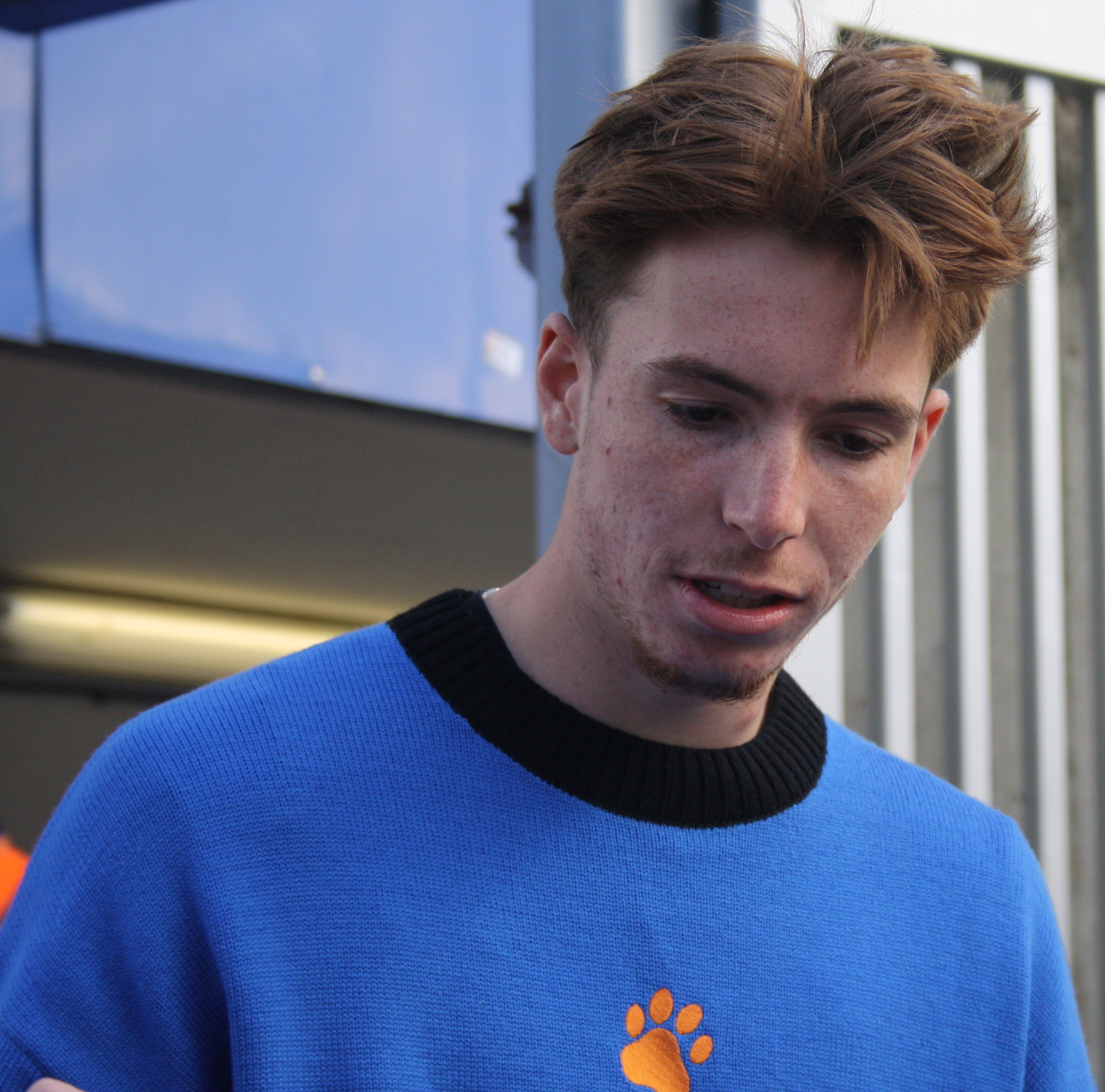
- Morgan in 2026 with Queens Park Rangers

Personal information
- Full name: Kieran Lloyd Morgan
- Date of birth: 17 March 2006 (age 20)
- Place of birth: Gillingham, England
- Height: 1.85 m (6 ft 1 in)
- Position: Midfielder

Team information
- Current team: Bradford City (on loan from Queens Park Rangers)
- Number: 22

Youth career
- 2013–2024: Tottenham Hotspur

Senior career*
Years	Team	Apps	(Gls)
2024–	Queens Park Rangers	59	(3)
2026–	→ Bradford City (loan)	2	(0)

International career^{‡}
2025–	England U20	3	(0)
- * Club domestic league appearances and goals as of 02:17, 28 October 2026 (UTC) ‡ National team caps and goals as of 23:33, 31 March 2026 (UTC)

Kieran Lloyd Morgan (born 17 March 2006) is an English professional footballer who plays as a midfielder for Bradford City, on loan from EFL Championship club Queens Park Rangers.

== Club career ==
Morgan started his career in the Tottenham Hotspur academy, joining at Under-8s level before being released in 2024. Following his release, he joined Championship club Queens Park Rangers' Development Squad.

On 19 October 2024, Morgan made his senior debut as a second-half substitute in a 2–1 home defeat to Portsmouth. Three days later, he scored a first senior goal in a 1–1 draw with Coventry City, impressing local press with his performance from the bench. Having established himself in the first-team, a string of impressive performances saw him sign a new long-term contract in January 2025.

On 31 August 2026, Morgan joined League One club Bradford City on loan until the end of the 2026–27 season.

== International career ==
In September 2025, Morgan received his first international selection when he was included in the England under-20 squad and on 5 September 2025 made his debut coming on as a substitute during a defeat against Italy U20 at Chesterfield.

== Career statistics ==
As of 27 October 2026

Appearances and goals by club, season and competition
Club	Season	League			FA Cup		League Cup		Other		Total	
Club	Season	Division	Apps	Goals	Apps	Goals	Apps	Goals	Apps	Goals	Apps	Goals
Queens Park Rangers	2024–25	Championship	30	1	1	0	0	0	—		31	1
Queens Park Rangers	2025–26	Championship	29	2	1	0	0	0	—		30	2
Queens Park Rangers	2026–27	Championship	0	0	—		—		—		0	0
Queens Park Rangers	Total		59	3	2	0	0	0	0	0	61	3
Bradford City (loan)	2026–27	League One	2	0	0	0	2	0	2	0	6	0
Career total			61	3	2	0	2	0	2	0	67	3
