= 2026–27 Bradford City A.F.C. season =

124th season in existence of Bradford City AFC

Bradford City
2026–27 season
- Chairman: Stefan Rupp
- Manager: Michael Duff (from 6 October); Mark Trueman & Colin Doyle (interim); Graham Alexander (until 28 September)
- Stadium: Valley Parade
- FA Cup: TBD
- EFL Cup: Fourth round
- EFL Trophy: Group stage
- Top goalscorer: League: Bobby Pointon (2 goals); All: Will Swan; Nick Powell; (3 goals each)
Home colours	Away colours	Third colours

The 2026–27 season is the 124th season in the history of Bradford City Association Football Club and their second season back in League One since the 2018–19 season following their promotion from League Two in the 2024–25 season. In addition to the domestic league, the club will also participate in the FA Cup, the EFL Cup, and the EFL Trophy.

== Managerial changes ==
On 25 September 2026, manager Graham Alexander and assistant manager Chris Lucketti departed the club, and signed with EFL Championship club Preston North End. Mark Trueman and Colin Doyle took over as joint-caretaker managers following their departures. Eleven days later, the club appointed Michael Duff as the new manager on a four-year contract.

== Squad ==
=== Current squad ===
As of 31 August 2026

No.	Nationality	Name	Position(s)	Date of birth (age)	Previous club	Notes
Goalkeepers
1	(England)	Cameron Dawson	GK	7 July 1995 (age 31)	(England) Rotherham United	—
21	(Scotland)	Jon McCracken	GK	24 May 2000 (age 26)	(Scotland) Dundee	—
Defenders
2	(England)	Reece Welch	CB	19 September 2003 (age 23)	(England) Everton	—
3	(The Gambia)	Ibou Touray	LB	24 December 1994 (age 31)	(England) Stockport County	—
5	(England)	Macaulay Gillesphey	CB	24 November 1995 (age 30)	(England) Charlton Athletic	—
6	(England)	Callum Connolly	CB	23 September 1997 (age 29)	(England) Stockport County	—
7	(England)	Josh Neufville	RB, RW	22 March 2001 (age 25)	(England) AFC Wimbledon	—
14	(Australia)	Hayden Matthews	CB	19 June 2004 (age 22)	(England) Portsmouth	on loan
15	(England)	Aden Baldwin	CB	10 June 1997 (age 29)	(England) Notts County	—
16	(England)	George Pratt	CB	17 September 2003 (age 23)	(England) Blackburn Rovers	on loan
27	(Republic of Ireland)	Corey O'Keeffe	RB, RWB, RW	5 June 1998 (age 28)	(England) Barnsley	—
28	(England)	Matthew Pennington	CB	6 October 1994 (age 32)	(England) Blackpool	—
30	(England)	Oscar Lunn	CB	Unknown	None	—
Midfielders
8	(England)	Adam Phillips	AM	15 January 1998 (age 28)	(England) Barnsley	—
10	(England)	Antoni Sarcevic	CM, AM	13 March 1992 (age 34)	(England) Stockport County	captain
17	(Republic of Ireland)	Tyreik Wright	LM	22 September 2001 (age 25)	(England) Plymouth Argyle	—
20	(England)	Henry Cartwright	DM	11 December 2004 (age 21)	(England) Leicester City	—
22	(England)	Kieran Morgan	CM	17 March 2006 (age 20)	(England) Queens Park Rangers	on loan
23	(England)	Bobby Pointon	CM	4 January 2004 (age 22)	None	—
25	(England)	Nick Powell	AM	23 March 1994 (age 32)	(England) Stockport County	—
32	(England)	George Lapslie	AM	5 September 1997 (age 29)	(England) Gillingham	—
Forwards
9	(England)	Jake Beesley	ST	2 December 1996 (age 29)	(England) Burton Albion	—
11	(England)	Stephen Humphrys	CF	15 September 1997 (age 29)	(England) Barnsley	—
19	(England)	Kayden Jackson	ST	22 February 1994 (age 32)	(England) Derby County	—
24	(England)	Will Swan	CF	26 October 2000 (age 26)	(England) Crawley Town	—
29	(England)	Harry Ibbitson	CF	10 December 2005 (age 20)	(England) Chorley	—

=== Out on loan ===
No.	Nationality	Name	Position(s)	Date of birth (age)	Current club	Notes
20	(England)	Tommy Leigh	AM, CM	13 April 2000 (age 26)	(England) Bristol Rovers	Returns end of season
31	(England)	Zac Hadi	GK	13 February 2006 (age 20)	(England) Spennymoor Town	Returns on 6 September 2026

== Staff ==
Executive
Majority owner and chairman	(Germany) Stefan Rupp
Chief executive officer	(England) Ryan Sparks
General manager	(England) Davide Longo
Director and company secretary	(England) Alan Biggin
Director of operations	(England) Paula Watson
Coaching staff
Head of football operations	(England) David Sharpe
Interim manager and first team coach	(England) Mark Trueman
Interim manager and goalkeeping coach	(Republic of Ireland) Colin Doyle

== Transfers ==
=== Transfers in/loans in ===
No.	Name	Pos.	Transferred from	Fee/notes	Date	Ref.
9	(England) Jake Beesley	FW	(England) Burton Albion	Undisclosed fee; two-year contract	15 June 2026 (Note: The transfer was announced on 2 June, and would become official on June 15 once the transfer window opened.)	
8	(England) Adam Phillips	MF	(England) Barnsley	Undisclosed fee; three-year contract	19 June 2026	
6	(England) Callum Connolly	DF	(England) Stockport County	Signed on a free on 29 June 2025; two-year contract	1 July 2026 (Note: The transfer was announced on 29 June, and would become official on July 1 once Connolly's contract at Stockport County expired.)	
5	(England) Macaulay Gillesphey	DF	(England) Charlton Athletic	Undisclosed fee; two-year contract	1 July 2026	
21	(Scotland) Jon McCracken	GK	(Scotland) Dundee	Signed on a free on 29 June 2026; three-year contract	1 July 2026 (Note: The transfer was announced on 25 June, and would become official on July 1 once McCracken's contract at Dundee expired.)	
20	(England) Henry Cartwright	MF	(England) Leicester City	Undisclosed fee; three-year contract	3 July 2026	
2	(England) Reece Welch	DF	(England) Everton	Signed on a free on 5 August 2026; two-year contract	5 August 2026	
1	(England) Cameron Dawson	GK	(England) Rotherham United	Signed from free agency	13 August 2026	
16	(England) George Pratt	DF	(England) Blackburn Rovers	Season-long loan	27 August 2026	
14	(Australia) Hayden Matthews	DF	(Australia) Portsmouth	Season-long loan	31 August 2026	
22	(England) Kieran Morgan	MF	(England) Queens Park Rangers	Season-long loan	31 August 2026	
27	(Republic of Ireland) Corey O'Keeffe	DF	(England) Barnsley	Undisclosed fee; two-year contract	1 September 2026	

=== Transfers/loans out ===
No.	Name	Pos.	Transferred/loaned to	Fee/notes	Date	Ref.
6	(England) Max Power	MF	(England) Wigan Athletic	Undisclosed fee; signed with Wigan Athletic on 6 June 2026	15 June 2026 (Note: The transfer was announced on 6 June, and would become official on 15 June once the transfer window opened.)	
21	(England) Jenson Metcalfe	MF	(England) Millwall	Undisclosed fee	15 June 2026	
20	(England) Tommy Leigh	MF	(England) Bristol Rovers	Season-long loan	17 June 2026	
26	(Jamaica) Curtis Tilt	DF	(England) Burton Albion	Undisclosed fee	29 June 2026	
5	(Republic of Ireland) Neill Byrne	DF	(England) Doncaster Rovers	Contract expired; signed with Doncaster Rovers on 9 June 2026 (Note: The transfer was announced on 9 June, and would become official on 30 June once Byrne's contract expired.)	30 June 2026	
9	(England) Andy Cook	FW	(England) Grimsby Town	Contract expired; signed with Grimsby Town on 15 June 2026 (Note: The transfer was announced on 15 June, and would become official on 30 June once Cook's contract expired.)	30 June 2026	
8	(Wales) Lee Evans	MF	(England) Northampton Town	Contract expired; signed with Northampton Town 7 August 2026	30 June 2026	
35	(Northern Ireland) George Goodman	DF	(England) Hull City	Contract expired; signed with Hull City on 14 August 2026	30 June 2026	
25	(England) Joe Hilton	GK	—N/a	Contract expired	30 June 2026	
18	(Republic of Ireland) Ciarán Kelly	DF	(England) Bristol Rovers	Contract expired; signed with Bristol Rovers on 22 June 2026 (Note: The transfer was announced on 22 June, and would become official on 30 June once Kelly's contract expired.)	30 June 2026	
8	(Wales) Lee Evans	MF	(England) Northampton Town	Contract expired; signed with Northampton Town on 7 August 2026	30 June 2026	
12	(Kenya) Clarke Oduor	MF	—N/a	Contract expired	30 June 2026	
31	(England) Zac Hadi	GK	(England) Spennymoor Town	Loan until 6 September 2026	7 August 2026	
1	(England) Sam Walker	GK	(England) Watford	Undisclosed fee	12 August 2026	
4	(Wales) Joe Wright	DF	(Scotland) Dundee	Undisclosed fee	31 August 2026	
30	(England) Oscar Lunn	DF	(England) Whitby Town	Loan until 18 December 2026	20 November 2026	

=== New contracts ===
Date	Pos.	Player	Contract until	Ref.
18 May 2026	DF	(England) Aden Baldwin	30 June 2027	
18 May 2026	MF	(England) Antoni Sarcevic	30 June 2027	
18 May 2026	DF	(Republic of Ireland) Tyreik Wright	30 June 2027	
1 July 2026 (Note: The contract was announced on 22 June, and would officially commence on July 1.)	DF	(England) Oscar Lunn	Undisclosed (Note: First professional contract)	
31 July 2026	DF	(England) Aden Baldwin	30 June 2028 (Note: Option of a further year)	
7 August 2026	MF	(England) Nick Powell	30 June 2027	
24 August 2026	MF	(England) Antoni Sarcevic	30 June 2028	

== Pre-season and friendlies ==
On 10 June, Bradford City announced their pre-season schedule, with friendlies against FC United of Manchester, Halifax Town, Accrington Stanley, Campion, Bradford (Park Avenue), and Preston North End along with a training camp in Obertraun, Austria. Two planned friendlies, one in Austria, and another on 1 August at a yet to be determined location are yet to be finalized. On 14 July, Gmunden was confirmed as the pre-season opponents during the Austria trip. The final pre-season destination was determined to be an away fixture at Salford City.

Win Draw Loss Fixtures

4 July 2026 Friendly	FC United of Manchester	1–2	Bradford City	Moston
10:00 BST	Hayes-Green 68'	Report	Trialist 75'; Phillips 82'	Stadium: Broadhurst Park; Attendance: 1,054

11 July 2026 Friendly	Halifax Town	1–6	Bradford City	Halifax
7:30 BST	Kawa 42'	Report	Swan 2', 45+1'; Jackson 7'; Powell 12'; Ibbitson 75'; Pointon 78'	Stadium: The Shay; Attendance: 2,601

17 July 2026 Friendly	Accrington Stanley	1–0	Bradford City	Accrington
19:30 BST	Brown 35'	Report		Stadium: Crown Ground; Attendance: 1,034 (575 away)

21 July 2025 Friendly	Campion	3–0	Bradford City	Manningham
19:30 BST		Report		Stadium: Scotchman Road

24 July 2025 Friendly	Gmunden	0–4	Bradford City	Gmunden, Austria
17:30 CEST		Report	Swan 42' (pen.), 47'; Powell 49'; Sarcevic 72' (pen.)	Stadium: Gmunden Obertraun Base

28 July 2025 Friendly	Bradford (Park Avenue)	1–0	Bradford City	Bradford
14:30 BST		Report		Stadium: Horsfall Stadium

29 July 2025 Friendly	Bradford City	3–2	Preston North End	Bradford
19:30 BST	Swan 10'; Wright 64'; Powell 82'	Report	Osmajić 53'; Storey 58'	Stadium: Valley Parade

1 August 2025 Friendly	Salford City	2–2	Bradford City	Salford
10:30 BST	Langstaff 32'; J. Powell 54'	Report	Phillips 45+2'; N. Powell 57'	Stadium: Moor Lane

== Competitions ==
=== League One ===
==== League table ====
Pos	Team	Pld	W	D	L	GF	GA	GD	Pts	Promotion, qualification or relegation
4	Luton Town	15	8	3	4	29	22	+7	27	Qualification for League One play-offs
5	Sheffield Wednesday	15	7	5	3	27	15	+12	26	Qualification for League One play-offs
6	Bradford City	14	6	5	3	12	10	+2	23	Qualification for League One play-offs
7	Plymouth Argyle	16	7	2	7	21	24	−3	23	
8	Reading	16	6	4	6	26	19	+7	22	

Updated to match(es) played on 21 November 2026. Source: EFL Official Website
Rules for classification: 1) Points; 2) Goal difference; 3) Number of goals scored; 4) Head-to-head results; 5) Wins; 6) Away goals; 7) Penalty points (sec 9.5); 8) 12-point sending off offences

==== Results summary ====
Overall								Home						Away					
Pld	W	D	L	GF	GA	GD	Pts	W	D	L	GF	GA	GD	W	D	L	GF	GA	GD
14	6	5	3	12	10	+2	23	3	2	2	8	7	+1	3	3	1	4	3	+1

Last updated: 21 November 2026.
Source: Soccerway

==== Results by round ====
Round	1	2	3	4	5	6	7	9	10	11	12	13	14	15^{2}	16	8^{1}	17	18	19	20	21	22	23	24	25	26	27	28
Ground	H	A	A	H	H	A	A	A	H	H	A	A	H	A	H	H	A	H	H	A	H	A	A	H	A	H	H	A
Result	W	W	L	L	W	W	W	D	D	W	D	D	L	P	D													
Position	3	1	6	11	4	3	1	2	2	1	3	3	7	P	6													
Points	3	6	6	6	9	12	15	16	17	20	21	22	22	P	23													

Source: EFL
A = Away; H = Home; W = Win; D = Draw; L = Loss; P = Postponed
Notes:
- ^{1} Matchday 8 (vs. Barnsley) was postponed due to international call-ups.
- ^{2} Matchday 15 (vs. Leicester City) was postponed due to international call-ups.

==== Matches ====
On 25 June, the League One fixtures were announced, with Bradford hosting Peterborough United on the opening weekend.

Win Draw Loss Fixtures 1

15 August 2026 1	Bradford City	2–0	Peterborough United	Bradford
10:00 BST	Jackson (yellow card) 45+1'; Gillesphey 54'; Sarcevic (yellow card) 66'; Powell 75'; Phillips (yellow card) 76'	Report	Okagbue (yellow card) 22' (yellow-red card) 85'; Weir (yellow card) 66'	Stadium: Mbanq Valley Parade; Attendance: 19,871; Referee: Tony Harrington

20 August 2026 2	Sheffield Wednesday	0–1	Bradford City	Owlerton
20:00 BST	Mitchell (yellow card) 61'	Report	Baldwin 47'; Pennington (yellow card) 77'	Stadium: Hillsborough Stadium; Attendance: 33,188; Referee: Thomas Parsons
Note: Fixture was initially scheduled for 18 August, but was moved for live Sky Sports broadcasting.

29 August 2026 3	Plymouth Argyle	2–0	Bradford City	Plymouth
15:00 BST	Evans (yellow card) 2'; Harding (yellow card) 33'; Pleguezuelo 44'; White 50'	Report	Beesley (yellow card) 2'; Connolly (yellow card) 88'	Stadium: Home Park; Attendance: 15,494; Referee: Carl Brook

1 September 2026 4	Bradford City	1–2	Cambridge United	Bradford
19:45 BST	Pointon 76'; Connolly (yellow card) 79'	Report	Kaikai 58'; Knight 88'	Stadium: Mbanq Valley Parade; Attendance: 18,098; Referee: Scott Oldham

5 September 2026 5	Bradford City	1–0	Mansfield Town	Bradford
15:00 BST	Sarcevic 18', (yellow card) 63'; Prat (yellow card) 90+1'	Report	Reed (yellow card) 60'; Hewitt (yellow card) 87'	Stadium: Mbanq Valley Parade; Referee: Zac Kennard-Kettle

12 September 2026 6	Notts County	0–1	Bradford City	Nottingham
12:30 BST	Evans (yellow card) 39'; Ness (yellow card) 58'; Kanu (yellow card) 69'; Bedeau (yellow card) 77'	Report	Touray (yellow card) 11'; Sarcevic (yellow card) 14'; Pratt 52', (yellow card) 71'; Powell (yellow card) 90'	Stadium: Meadow Lane; Attendance: 12,511 (2,226 away); Referee: Alex Chilowicz
Note: Fixture was initially scheduled for a 15:00 kick-off, but was brought forward for live Sky Sports.

19 September 2026 7	Luton Town	0–1	Bradford City	Luton
15:00 BST	Gore (yellow card) 60'; Ashby (yellow card) 83' (yellow-red card) 90+5'	Report	Pointon 4'; Connolly (yellow card) 46'; Sarcevic (yellow card) 67'; Morgan (yellow card) 72'; Gillesphey (yellow card) 90+4'	Stadium: Kenilworth Road; Attendance: 11,647 (1,309 away); Referee: Ross Martin

3 October 2026 9	Reading	1–1	Bradford City	Reading
15:00 BST	Rinomhota (yellow card) 12'; Roberts (yellow card) 18'; Godwin-Malife 66'	Report	Beesley 4'; Touray (yellow card) 35'; Baldwin (yellow card) 39'; Pointon (yellow card) 71'	Stadium: Select Car Leasing Stadium; Attendance: 12,737 (1,118 away); Referee: Paul Howard

10 October 2026 10	Bradford City	0–0	Leyton Orient	Bradford
15:00 BST	Pennington (yellow card) 80'		Morris (yellow card) 26'; Kabia (yellow card) 60'; Gilbert (yellow card) 82'	Stadium: Mbanq Valley Parade; Referee: Dean Whitestone

17 October 2026 11	Bradford City	2–0	Stevenage	Bradford
15:00 BST	Sarcevic 79' (pen.); Connolly (yellow card) 81'; Swan 87'	Report	Phillips (yellow card) 79'	Stadium: Mbanq Valley Parade; Referee: Simon Mather

20 October 2026 12	Burton Albion	0–0	Bradford City	Burton upon Trent
19:45 BST	Rodrigues (yellow card) 44'; Tilt (yellow card) 51'; Sibbick (yellow card) 81'; Krubally (yellow card) 88'	Report	Sarcevic (yellow card) 52'; Touray (yellow card) 90+4'	Stadium: Pirelli Stadium; Attendance: 3,574; Referee: Sunny Singh Gill

24 October 2026 13	Oxford United	0–0	Bradford City	Littlemore
15:00 BST		Report	Connolly (yellow card) 19'; Pratt (yellow card) 45+3'	Stadium: The Kassam Stadium; Referee: Neil Hair

31 October 2026 14	Bradford City	0–3	Huddersfield Town	Bradford
12:30 GMT	O'Keeffe (yellow card) 14'; Sarcevic (yellow card) 45+1' (red card) 69'	Report	Low 4'; Young (yellow card) 8'; Collins (yellow card) 15'; Fernandes 48'; Taylor 51'; Mumba (yellow card) 63'; Humphreys (yellow card) 89'	Stadium: Mbanq Valley Parade; Attendance: 23,776; Referee: Leigh Doughty
Note: Fixture was initially scheduled for a 15:00 kick-off, but was brought forward following advice from West Yorkshire Police.

14 November 2026 15	Leicester City	Postponed	Bradford City	Leicester
15:00 GMT				Stadium: King Power Stadium
Note: Fixture was postponed due to international call-ups within the hosts squad.

21 November 2026 16	Bradford City	2–2	Doncaster Rovers	Bradford
15:00 GMT	Powell 55'; Touray (yellow card) 59'; Humphrys 78'	Report	Pearson (yellow card) 1'; Thomas 745'; Grehan 90+5'	Stadium: Mbanq Valley Parade; Attendance: 19,836; Referee: Darren Drysdale

24 November 2026 8	Bradford City	v	Barnsley	Bradford
19:45 GMT				Stadium: Mbanq Valley Parade
Note: Fixture was initially scheduled for 26 September, but was rearranged due to international call-ups within the Barnsley squad.

28 November 2026 17	Wycombe Wanderers	v	Bradford City	High Wycombe
15:00 GMT				Stadium: Adams Park

1 December 2026 18	Bradford City	v	Milton Keynes Dons	Bradford
19:45 GMT				Stadium: Mbanq Valley Parade

12 December 2026 19	Bradford City	v	AFC Wimbledon	Bradford
15:00 GMT				Stadium: Mbanq Valley Parade

19 December 2026 20	Bromley	v	Bradford City	Bromley
15:00 GMT				Stadium: Copperjax Community Stadium

26 December 2026 21	Bradford City	v	Stockport County	Bradford
15:00 GMT				Stadium: Mbanq Valley Parade

29 December 2026 22	Blackpool	v	Bradford City	Blackpool
19:45 GMT				Stadium: Bloomfield Road

1 January 2027 23	Wigan Athletic	v	Bradford City	Wigan
15:00 GMT				Stadium: The Brick Community Stadium

9 January 2027 24	Bradford City	v	Bromley	Bradford
15:00 GMT				Stadium: Mbanq Valley Parade

16 January 2027 25	Stevenage	v	Bradford City	Stevenage
15:00 GMT				Stadium: Stevenage FC Stadium

19 January 2027 26	Bradford City	v	Burton Albion	Bradford
19:45 GMT				Stadium: Mbanq Valley Parade

23 January 2027 27	Bradford City	v	Oxford United	Bradford
15:00 GMT				Stadium: Mbanq Valley Parade

30 January 2027 28	Huddersfield Town	v	Bradford City	Huddersfield
12:30 GMT				Stadium: Accu Stadium
Note: Fixture was initially scheduled for a 15:00 kick-off, but was brought forward following advice from West Yorkshire Police.

6 February 2027 29	Bradford City	v	Plymouth Argyle	Bradford
15:00 GMT				Stadium: Mbanq Valley Parade

9 February 2027 30	Cambridge United	v	Bradford City	Cambridge
19:45 GMT				Stadium: Abbey Stadium

13 February 2027 31	Mansfield Town	v	Bradford City	Mansfield
12:30 GMT				Stadium: Field Mill
Note: Fixture was initially scheduled for a 15:00 kick-off, but was brought forward for live Sky Sports broadcasting.

20 February 2027 32	Bradford City	v	Notts County	Bradford
15:00 GMT				Stadium: Mbanq Valley Parade

27 February 2027 33	Bradford City	v	Leicester City	Bradford
15:00 GMT				Stadium: Mbanq Valley Parade

=== FA Cup ===
Bradford were drawn at home to Marine in the first round and away to Wimborne Town in the second round.

Win Draw Loss Fixtures

7 November 2026 First round	Bradford City	7–0	Marine	Bradford
15:00 GMT	Powell 10', 16'; Phillips 21', 87'; Pennington 33'; Lapslie (penalty missed) 54', 73'; Swan 58'	Report	McIntyre (yellow card) 18'; Sinclair-Smith (yellow card) 45+3'; Abankwah (red card) 54'; Raikhy (yellow card) 61'	Stadium: Mbanq Valley Parade; Attendance: 7,149 (1,255 away); Referee: Andrew Miller

4 December 2026 Second round	Wimborne Town	v	Bradford City	Wimborne Minster
19:30 GMT				Stadium: The Wyatt Homes Stadium
Note: Fixture was selected for live TNT Sports broadcasting.

=== EFL Cup ===
Bradford were drawn at home to EFL League Two club Rochdale in the first round. Bradford City defeated Rochdale 2–0, and were drawn against EFL Championship club Burnley at home in the second round. Burnley was defeated following a penalty shoot-out after the match ended scoreless, and Bradford City were drawn away against fellow League One side Leyton Orient in the third round. In the fourth round, a home tie against another League One club, Peterborough United, was drawn. For the quarter-finals, the Bantams were drawn away to Premier League side Manchester City.

Win Draw Loss Fixtures

8 August 2025 First round	Bradford City	2–0	Rochdale	Bradford
15:00 BST	Swan 45+1'; Baldwin 67'	Report	Rodney (yellow card) 22'; Brown (yellow card) 77'	Stadium: Mbanq Valley Parade; Attendance: 6,915 (1,110 away); Referee: Declan Brown

26 August 2025 Second round	Bradford City	0–0 (4–2 p)	Burnley	Bradford
14:45 BST	Cartwright (yellow card) 44'; Touray (yellow card) 90+3'	Report		Stadium: Mbanq Valley Parade; Attendance: 19,686; Referee: Martin Coy
	Penalties
	Sarcevic (penalty scored); Gillesphey (penalty scored); Touray (penalty scored); Phillips (penalty scored)		Flemming (penalty scored); Amdouni (penalty missed); Bruun Larsen (penalty missed); Edwards (penalty scored)

8 September 2026 Third round	Leyton Orient	1–3	Bradford City	Leyton
19:45 BST	Archibald (yellow card) 23'; Gillesphey 38' (o.g.); El Mizouni (yellow card) 44'; Chinedu (yellow card) 49'	Report	Lapslie (yellow card) 40'; Swan 45'; Humphrys 58'; Powell 88'	Stadium: Brisbane Road

27 October 2026 Fourth round	Bradford City	2–0	Peterborough United	Bradford
19:45 GMT	Gillesphey (yellow card) 5', (goal) 13'; Welch (yellow card) 20'; Lapslie (yellow card) 28'; Pointon (yellow card) 31'; Connolly (yellow card) 34'; Phillips 67'; Morgan (yellow card) 86'	Report	Mendonça (yellow card) 59'; Mills (yellow card) 73'	Stadium: Mbanq Valley Parade; Attendance: 14,732; Referee: Thomas Kirk

15 December 2026 Quarter-final	Manchester City	v	Bradford City	Manchester
20:00 GMT				Stadium: City of Mancester Stadium

=== EFL Trophy ===
Bradford were drawn against York City, Rotherham United, and the Newcastle United U21s in the group stage.

Pos	Div	Team	Pld	W	PW	PL	L	GF	GA	GD	Pts	Qualification
1	L1	Bradford City	3	3	0	0	0	10	1	+9	9	Advance to Round 2
2	ACA	Newcastle United U21	3	2	0	0	1	5	3	+2	6	Advance to Round 2
3	L2	Rotherham United	3	0	1	0	2	1	6	−5	2	
4	L2	York City	3	0	0	1	2	2	8	−6	1	

Source: EFL

Win Draw Loss Fixtures

22 September 2026 1	Bradford City	2–1	Newcastle United U21	Bradford
19:30 BST	Lapslie (yellow card) 40'; Powell 59', 71'; O'Keeffe (yellow card) 81'; Morgan (yellow card) 83'	Report	Ferreira 42'; Charlton (yellow card) 61'; Miley (yellow card) 67'; Bailey (yellow card) 77'; Cá (yellow card) 90+1'; Emerson (red card) 90+3'	Stadium: Mbanq Valley Parade; Attendance: 2,132 (51 away); Referee: Dean Watson

6 October 2026 2	Rotherham United	0–4	Bradford City	Rotherham
19:00 BST	Buyabu (yellow card) 17'; Fitzgerald (yellow card) 43'; Austerfield (yellow card) 81'	Report	Swan 3', 62'; Humphrys 11'; Powell 86' (pen.)	Stadium: New York Stadium; Attendance: 1,419 (467 away); Referee: Jamie Robinson

10 November 2026 1	Bradford City	4–0	York City	Bradford
19:30 BST	Sarcevic 32'; Humphrys 61'; Swan 70'; Powell 86'	Report	Farrar (yellow card) 83'; King (yellow card) 84'	Stadium: Mbanq Valley Parade; Attendance: 2,524 (697 away); Referee: Jamie O'Connor

== Squad statistics ==
=== Appearances ===
As of match played 21 November 2026

Starting appearances are listed first, followed by substitute appearances after the + symbol where applicable.
Players with no appearances are not included on the list

No.	Pos	Nat	Player	Total		League One		FA Cup		EFL Cup		EFL Trophy	
No.	Pos	Nat	Player	Apps	Goals	Apps	Goals	Apps	Goals	Apps	Goals	Apps	Goals
1	GK	(England) ENG	Cameron Dawson	3	0	1+0	0	0+0	0	0+0	0	2+0	0
2	DF	(England) ENG	Reece Welch	10	0	1+1	0	0+1	0	3+1	0	3+0	0
3	DF	(The Gambia) GAM	Ibou Touray	19	0	14+0	0	1+0	0	2+2	0	0+0	0
5	DF	(England) ENG	Macaulay Gillesphey	17	2	4+5	1	1+0	0	4+1	1	2+0	0
6	DF	(England) ENG	Callum Connolly	19	0	13+0	0	1+0	0	2+2	0	0+1	0
7	DF	(England) ENG	Josh Neufville	10	0	8+0	0	0+0	0	1+1	0	0+0	0
8	MF	(England) ENG	Adam Phillips	20	3	6+7	0	1+0	2	1+3	1	1+1	0
9	FW	(England) ENG	Jake Beesley	15	1	12+0	1	0+0	0	3+0	0	0+0	0
10	MF	(England) ENG	Antoni Sarcevic	18	3	14+0	2	0+0	0	2+1	0	1+0	1
11	FW	(England) ENG	Stephen Humphrys	9	3	0+3	1	0+1	0	1+1	0	3+0	2
14	DF	(Australia) AUS	Hayden Matthews	5	0	0+0	0	0+1	0	1+0	0	3+0	0
15	DF	(England) ENG	Aden Baldwin	18	2	14+0	1	1+0	0	1+2	1	0+0	0
16	DF	(England) ENG	George Pratt	11	1	10+0	1	0+0	0	0+0	0	1+0	0
17	MF	(Republic of Ireland) IRL	Tyreik Wright	1	0	0+0	0	0+0	0	1+0	0	0+0	0
19	FW	(England) ENG	Kayden Jackson	19	0	10+4	0	1+0	0	3+1	0	0+0	0
20	MF	(England) ENG	Henry Cartwright	9	0	1+3	0	0+0	0	2+0	0	3+0	0
21	GK	(Scotland) SCO	Jon McCracken	18	0	13+0	0	1+0	0	4+0	0	0+0	0
22	MF	(England) ENG	Kieran Morgan	10	0	1+3	0	1+0	0	1+1	0	3+0	0
23	MF	(England) ENG	Bobby Pointon	17	2	9+3	2	1+0	0	1+2	0	0+1	0
24	FW	(England) ENG	Will Swan	19	6	5+6	1	0+1	1	3+1	1	3+0	3
25	MF	(England) ENG	Nick Powell	21	9	1+13	2	1+0	2	0+3	1	0+3	4
27	MF	(England) ENG	Corey O'Keeffe	13	0	3+5	0	0+0	0	2+0	0	3+0	0
28	DF	(England) ENG	Matthew Pennington	18	1	13+0	0	1+0	1	3+0	0	0+1	0
29	FW	(England) ENG	Harry Ibbitson	3	0	0+0	0	0+0	0	0+0	0	2+1	0
30	DF	(England) ENG	Oscar Lunn	1	0	0+0	0	0+0	0	0+0	0	0+1	0
31	GK	(Iraq) IRQ	Zac Hadi	1	0	0+0	0	0+0	0	0+0	0	1+0	0
32	MF	(England) ENG	George Lapslie	8	1	1+2	0	0+1	1	2+0	0	2+0	0
42	DF	(England) ENG	Oliver Hewitt	1	0	0+0	0	0+0	0	0+0	0	0+1	0
43	MF	(England) ENG	Leroy Gomes	1	0	0+0	0	0+0	0	0+0	0	0+1	0
44	MF	(England) ENG	Gabriel Holt	1	0	0+0	0	0+0	0	0+0	0	0+1	0

=== Disciplinary record ===
As of match played 21 November 2026

Rank	No.	Pos.	Nat.	Name	League One			FA Cup			EFL Cup			EFL Trophy			Total		
Rank	No.	Pos.	Nat.	Name	Yellow card	(yellow card) (yellow-red card)	Red card	Yellow card	(yellow card) (yellow-red card)	Red card	Yellow card	(yellow card) (yellow-red card)	Red card	Yellow card	(yellow card) (yellow-red card)	Red card	Yellow card	(yellow card) (yellow-red card)	Red card
1	6	MF	(England)	Callum Connolly	5	0	0	0	0	0	1	0	0	0	0	0	6	0	0
1	10	MF	(England)	Antoni Sarcevic	4	1	0	0	0	0	0	0	0	0	0	0	4	1	0
3	3	DF	(The Gambia)	Ibou Touray	4	0	0	0	0	0	1	0	0	0	0	0	5	0	0
4	16	DF	(England)	George Pratt	3	0	0	0	0	0	0	0	0	0	0	0	3	0	0
4	22	MF	(England)	Kieran Morgan	1	0	0	0	0	0	1	0	0	1	0	0	3	0	0
4	32	MF	(England)	George Lapslie	0	0	0	0	0	0	2	0	0	1	0	0	3	0	0
7	5	DF	(England)	Macaulay Gillesphey	1	0	0	0	0	0	1	0	0	0	0	0	2	0	0
7	23	MF	(England)	Bobby Pointon	1	0	0	0	0	0	1	0	0	0	0	0	2	0	0
7	27	DF	(Republic of Ireland)	Corey O'Keeffe	1	0	0	0	0	0	0	0	0	1	0	0	2	0	0
7	28	DF	(England)	Matthew Pennington	2	0	0	0	0	0	0	0	0	0	0	0	2	0	0
11	2	DF	(England)	Reece Welch	0	0	0	0	0	0	1	0	0	0	0	0	1	0	0
11	8	MF	(England)	Adam Phillips	1	0	0	0	0	0	0	0	0	0	0	0	1	0	0
11	9	FW	(England)	Jake Beesley	1	0	0	0	0	0	0	0	0	0	0	0	1	0	0
11	15	DF	(England)	Aden Baldwin	1	0	0	0	0	0	0	0	0	0	0	0	1	0	0
11	19	FW	(England)	Kayden Jackson	1	0	0	0	0	0	0	0	0	0	0	0	1	0	0
11	20	MF	(England)	Henry Cartwright	0	0	0	0	0	0	1	0	0	0	0	0	1	0	0
11	25	MF	(England)	Nick Powell	1	0	0	0	0	0	0	0	0	0	0	0	1	0	0
Total					27	1	0	0	0	0	9	0	0	3	0	0	39	1	0

== Awards ==
=== Player awards ===
==== EFL League One Player of the Month ====
Month	Player		Ref.
August	(England) Matthew Pennington	Nominated	
October	(Scotland) Jon McCracken	Nominated	
