= George Pratt (footballer) =

English footballer

Personal information
- Full name: George Christopher John Pratt
- Date of birth: 17 September 2003 (age 23)
- Place of birth: Bradford, England
- Height: 1.93 m (6 ft 4 in)
- Position: Centre-back

Team information
- Current team: Bradford City (on loan from Blackburn Rovers)
- Number: 16

Youth career
- 2012–2018: UFCA Leeds
- 2018–2025: Blackburn Rovers

Senior career*
Years	Team	Apps	(Gls)
2021–	Blackburn Rovers	10	(0)
2021	→ Hyde United (loan)	4	(0)
2025	→ Chorley (loan)	6	(1)
2026–	→ Bradford City (loan)	4	(1)
- * Club domestic league appearances and goals as of 4 October 2026 (UTC)

George Christopher John Pratt (born 17 September 2003) is an English professional footballer who plays as a centre-back for EFL League One club Bradford City on loan from EFL Championship club Blackburn Rovers.

== Club career ==
Pratt is a product of the youth academy UFCA Leeds since 2012, and in 2018 moved to the youth academy of Blackburn Rovers where he signed an academy contract in 2019. On 28 October 2021, he joined Hyde United on a short-term working loan in the Northern Premier League. On 30 June 2022, he signed his first professional contract with Blackburn until 2024. On 18 May 2024, he extended his contract with Blackburn for an additional season. On 10 May 2025, he extended his contract with Blackburn until June 2026, with an option for another year.

On 8 September 2025, Pratt joined Chorley on a month-long loan in the National League North. On 3 October 2025, he extended his loan with Chorley an additional month. On 4 November 2025, he again extended his loan with Chorley until January 2026.

On 7 November 2025, he was recalled early from his loan by Blackburn, scoring one goal in seven appearances for Chorley. On 21 November 2025, he made his debut with Blackburn Rovers in a 2–1 EFL Championship away win over Preston North End.

On 3 December 2025, Pratt recorded his first assist for the club, heading the ball down for Andri Guðjohnsen in a 1–1 draw with Ipswich Town.

On 27 August 2026, Pratt moved to League One club Bradford City on loan for the 2026–27 season.

== Career statistics ==
=== Club ===
As of match played on 12 September 2026

Appearances and goals by club, season and competition
Club	Season	League			National cup		League cup		Other		Total	
Club	Season	Division	Apps	Goals	Apps	Goals	Apps	Goals	Apps	Goals	Apps	Goals
Blackburn Rovers	2021–22	Championship	0	0	0	0	0	0	—		0	0
Blackburn Rovers	2025–26	Championship	10	0	1	0	0	0	—		11	0
Blackburn Rovers	Total		10	0	1	0	0	0	—		11	0
Chorley (loan)	2025–26	National League North	6	1	—		—		—		6	1
Bradford City(loan)	2026–27	League One	2	1	0	0	0	0	0	0	2	1
Career total			18	2	1	0	0	0	0	0	19	2
