= Tony Docherty =

Scottish footballer and coach

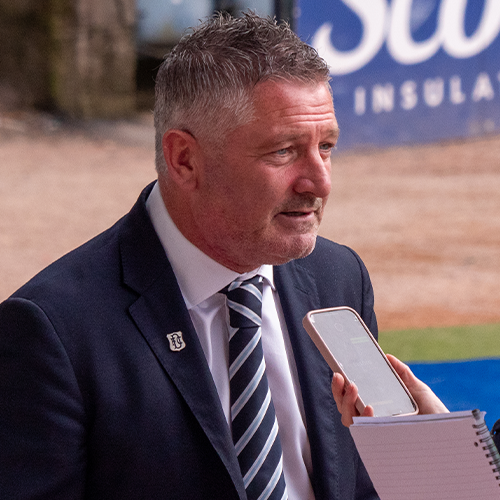
- Docherty as manager of Dundee in 2024

Personal information
- Date of birth: 24 January 1971 (age 55)
- Place of birth: East Kilbride, Scotland
- Position: Midfielder

Team information
- Current team: Scotland U21 (head coach)

Youth career
- EKYC

Senior career*
Years	Team	Apps	(Gls)
- Dunfermline Athletic
- Cambridge United
1991–1993	Stirling Albion	43	(0)
1993–1994	East Stirlingshire	5	(0)
1994–1995	Albion Rovers	10	(0)
Total		58	(0)

Managerial career
- 2023–2025: Dundee
- 2025: Ross County
- 2026–: Scotland U21
- * Club domestic league appearances and goals

Tony Docherty (born 24 January 1971) is a Scottish professional football manager and former player. He is currently the head coach of the Scotland national under-21 football team.

Docherty played as a midfielder for Dunfermline Athletic, Cambridge United, Stirling Albion, East Stirlingshire and Albion Rovers.

He was then the long-term assistant manager to Derek McInnes at St Johnstone, Bristol City, Aberdeen and Kilmarnock.

In 2023, Docherty became a manager in his own right at Dundee retaining the Dens Park club’s status in the Scottish Premiership for two seasons. Four months after departing Dundee, he managed Ross County from September to December 2025.

== Career ==
=== As a player ===
Docherty's short playing career began in 1987 with Dunfermline Athletic before moving to English side Cambridge United. In the early 1990s he returned to Scotland, having spells with Stirling Albion, East Stirlingshire and Albion Rovers.

=== Assistant manager ===
During his time with the Coatbridge club, Docherty became SFA development officer for the Glasgow area, spending three years there before a move to Falkirk as the community coach. Upon Ian McCall's appointment as manager at Brockville, Docherty became assistant manager, and when McCall moved to take charge of Dundee United in early 2003, Docherty came as part of the management team. Following McCall's dismissal and Gordon Chisholm's subsequent appointment, Docherty was promoted to first team coach, a position he held under the successive management spells of Craig Brewster and Craig Levein.

=== Derek McInnes ===
In November 2007, Docherty left Tannadice and moved to Scottish First Division side St Johnstone as assistant manager, working under former United player Derek McInnes. achieving promotion back to the SPL eighteen months later. When McInnes became manager of Bristol City in October 2011, Docherty followed him to Ashton Gate as assistant manager.

On 25 March 2013 he once again teamed up with McInnes, this time at SPL side Aberdeen. In July 2019 they signed new contracts with Aberdeen that were due to run until 2022, but they left Aberdeen in March 2021. A month later Docherty joined Forfar Athletic to assist caretaker manager Gary Irvine. Docherty teamed up again with McInnes at Kilmarnock in January 2022.

=== Dundee ===
Docherty became a manager in his own right in May 2023, when he was appointed by Dundee. Docherty would have a successful first season as head coach, and was named as the SPFL's Premiership Manager of the Month for March 2024. On 13 April 2024, Docherty would lead Dundee to top six football with a goalless draw away to former club Aberdeen. Later that month, Docherty would be nominated by PFA Scotland for Manager of the Year alongside long time partner Derek McInnes and John McGlynn. Docherty was also nominated in May for the Scottish Football Writers' Association's Manager of the Year award.

On 25 June 2024, Docherty committed to Dundee by signing a new contract with the club. After Dundee finished 10th in the 2024–25 Scottish Premiership, avoiding a relegation play-off by winning on the final day, Docherty was sacked by Dundee.

=== Ross County ===
On 2 September 2025, Docherty returned to management with Scottish Championship club Ross County. In the aftermath of a 6-0 defeat by Raith Rovers which left County bottom of the table, Docherty departed the club on 14 December 2025.

=== Scotland U21 ===
On 24 August 2026, Docherty was announced as the new head coach of the Scotland national under-21 football team, with Steven Naismith announced as his assistant.

== Managerial record ==
As of 13 December 2025

Managerial record by team and tenure
Team	From	To	Record				
Team	From	To	G	W	D	L	Win %
Dundee	29 May 2023	19 May 2025	90	31	20	39	34.44
Ross County	2 September 2025	14 December 2025	15	4	4	7	26.67
Career total			105	35	25	45	33.33

== Honours ==
=== Manager ===
Individual

- Scottish Premiership Manager of the Month: March 2024
- PFA Scotland Manager of the Year nominee: 2023–24
- SFWA Manager of the Year nominee: 2023–24
