= 2020–21 Arbroath F.C. season =

Arbroath
2020–21 season
- Chairman: Mike Caird
- Manager: Dick Campbell
- Stadium: Gayfield Park
- Scottish Championship: 7th
- Scottish Cup: Second round
- Scottish League Cup: Second round
- Top goalscorer: League: Jack Hamilton (8); All: Jack Hamilton (8)
Home colours	Away colours

The 2020–21 season was Arbroath's second consecutive season in the Scottish Championship, following their promotion from Scottish League One in the 2018–19 season. They also competed in the Scottish Cup and Scottish League Cup.

== Season summary ==
In June 2020, eight of the ten clubs voted in favour of shortening the season from the usual 36 games to 27 (playing each other three times), with the season tentatively scheduled to start on 17 October 2020. This was done to reduce costs in light of the coronavirus pandemic.

On 2 October, the SPFL announced that the Scottish Challenge Cup would be cancelled ahead of the upcoming season in order to reduce the number of fixtures being played.

== Competitions ==
=== Scottish Championship ===
Win	Draw	Loss

Date	Opponent	Venue	Result (Note: Arbroath's score written first)	Scorers	Attendance	Ref.
17 October 2020	Raith Rovers	Away	0–3	—	0 (Note: Match played behind closed doors)	
23 October 2020	Heart of Midlothian	Home	0–1	—	0	
31 October 2020	Inverness Caledonian Thistle	Away	1–3	Doolan 24'	0	
7 November 2020	Queen of the South	Home	1–1	Linn 48'	0	
21 November 2020	Greenock Morton	Home	0–0	—	0	
5 December 2020	Dundee	Away	0–1	—	0	
12 December 2020	Alloa Athletic	Home	0–1	—	0	
19 December 2020	Ayr United	Home	2–1	Craigen 36', 39'	0	
26 December 2020	Dunfermline Athletic	Away	0–1	—	0	
29 December 2020	Heart of Midlothian	Away	1–3	Doolan 48'	0	
16 January 2021	Queen of the South	Away	2–2	Stewart 63', O'Brien 65'	0	
22 January 2021	Dundee	Home	1–1	Little 8' pen.	0	
30 January 2021	Greenock Morton	Away	1–0	Hamilton 77'	0	
3 February 2021	Inverness Caledonian Thistle	Home	1–1	Hamilton 45'	0	
6 February 2021	Dunfermline Athletic	Home	2–0	O'Brien 27', Hilson 36'	0	
13 February 2021	Alloa Athletic	Away	1–1	Hamilton 24'	0	
20 February 2021	Raith Rovers	Home	1–0	Doolan 60'	0	
27 February 2021	Ayr United	Away	1–0	McKenna 63'	0	
6 March 2021	Queen of the South	Home	2–4	Hamilton 11', McKenna 22' pen.	0	
13 March 2021	Dundee	Away	0–2		0	
20 March 2021	Heart of Midlothian	Home	0–0		0	
27 March 2021	Inverness Caledonian Thistle	Away	0–1		0	
3 April 2021	Alloa Athletic	Home	2–1	Hamilton 59', Gold 83'	0	
10 April 2021	Raith Rovers	Home	2–2	Hamilton 72', Little 84'	0	
17 April 2021	Ayr United	Home	4–0	Little 11', Williamson 24', Hamilton 27', Hilson 65'	0	
24 April 2021	Dunfermline Athletic	Away	3–4	Hamilton 33', Low 35' pen., Stewart 82'	0	
30 April 2021	Greenock Morton	Home	0–0	—	0	

=== Scottish League Cup ===
==== Group stage ====
Win	Draw	Loss

Date	Opponent	Venue	Result	Scorers	Attendance	Ref.
6 October 2020	Stirling Albion	Away	2–1	Donnelly 14', O'Brien 32'	0	
10 October 2020	Montrose	Home	3–1	Swankie 27', Thomson 43', O'Brien 86'	0	
13 October 2020	Ross County	Away	1–2	Hilson 49'	0	
14 November 2020	Elgin City	Home	3–0	Gold 30', 39', Stewart 82'	0	

==== Knockout phase ====
Win	Draw	Loss

Round	Date	Opponent	Venue	Result	Scorers	Attendance	Ref.
Second round	28 November 2020	Dunfermline Athletic	Home	1–3	Hilson 65'	0	

=== Scottish Cup ===
Win	Draw	Loss

Round	Date	Opponent	Venue	Result	Scorers	Attendance	Ref.
Second round	23 March 2021	Falkirk	Home	1–2	O'Brien 8'	0	

== Player statistics ==
=== Appearances and goals ===
As of 30 April 2021

No.	Pos	Player	Championship		League Cup		Scottish Cup		Total	
No.	Pos	Player	Apps	Goals	Apps	Goals	Apps	Goals	Apps	Goals
1	GK	(Scotland) Derek Gaston	27	0	5	0	1	0	33	0
2	DF	(Scotland) Jason Thomson	25	0	5	1	0	0	30	1
3	DF	(Scotland) Colin Hamilton	24	0	4	0	1	0	29	0
4	DF	(Scotland) Ricky Little	26	3	5	0	1	0	32	3
5	DF	(Scotland) Thomas O'Brien	26	2	4	2	1	0	31	4
6	MF	(Scotland) Mark Whatley	2+3	0	0+1	0	0	0	6	0
7	MF	(Scotland) David Gold	16+7	1	3+1	2	0+1	0	28	3
8	MF	(Scotland) Michael McKenna	15+11	2	4+1	0	0+1	0	32	2
9	FW	(Scotland) Dale Hilson	22+4	2	3+2	2	1	0	32	4
10	MF	(Scotland) Gavin Swankie	4	0	2+3	1	0	0	9	1
11	MF	(Scotland) Bobby Linn	13+6	1	3+2	0	1	0	25	1
12	DF	(Scotland) Scott Stewart	9+13	2	3+2	1	1	0	28	3
14	FW	(Scotland) Kris Doolan	14+6	3	2+3	0	0	0	25	3
15	FW	(Scotland) Luke Donnelly	4+11	0	3+2	1	0	0	20	1
16	MF	(Scotland) Lewis Moore	3+4	0	0	0	1	0	8	0
17	DF	(Scotland) Jake Davidson	2	0	0	0	0	0	2	0
18	MF	(Scotland) Ben Williamson	17	1	0	0	0+1	0	18	1
19	FW	(Scotland) Jack Hamilton	14	8	0	0	1	0	15	8
21	GK	(Scotland) Scott Gallacher	0	0	0	0	0	0	0	0
22	DF	(Scotland) Carlo Pignatiello	1+2	0	0	0	1	0	4	0
28	MF	(England) James Craigen	16+4	2	3+1	0	1	0	25	2
32	MF	(Scotland) Nicky Low	5+1	1	0	0	0	0	6	1
Players who left the club during the 2020–21 season
16	FW	(Scotland) Michael Ruth	4+7	0	2+3	0	0	0	16	0
17	MF	(Scotland) Connor Smith	1+2	0	1+3	0	0	0	7	0
22	MF	(Finland) Miko Virtanen	8+1	0	3	0	0	0	12	0

== Team statistics ==
=== League table ===
Pos	Team	Pld	W	D	L	GF	GA	GD	Pts	Promotion, qualification or relegation
5	Inverness Caledonian Thistle	27	8	12	7	36	31	+5	36	
6	Queen of the South	27	9	5	13	38	51	−13	32	
7	Arbroath	27	7	9	11	28	34	−6	30	
8	Ayr United	27	6	11	10	31	37	−6	29	
9	Greenock Morton (O)	27	6	11	10	22	33	−11	29	Qualification for the Championship play-offs

Source: SPFL
Rules for classification: 1) Points; 2) Goal difference; 3) Goals scored; 4) Head-to-to head points; 5) Head-to-head goal difference; 6) Play-off (only for deciding promotion, play-off participation and relegation).
(O) Play-off winners

=== League Cup table ===
Pos	Team	Pld	W	PW	PL	L	GF	GA	GD	Pts	Qualification	ROS	ARB	ELG	STI	MON
1	Ross County	4	3	1	0	0	12	5	+7	11	Qualification for the Second round	—	2–1	—	3–0	—
2	Arbroath	4	3	0	0	1	9	4	+5	9	Qualification for the Second round	—	—	3–0	—	3–1
3	Elgin City	4	2	0	0	2	5	7	−2	6		1–4	—	—	2–0	—
4	Stirling Albion	4	1	0	0	3	3	8	−5	3		—	1–2	—	—	2–1
5	Montrose	4	0	0	1	3	5	10	−5	1		3–3p	—	0–2	—	—

Rules for classification: 1) points, 2) goal difference, 3) goals scored, 4) away goals scored, 5) matches won, 6) away matches won, 7) drawing of lots.

== Transfers ==
=== Transfers in ===
Date	Position	Name	From	Fee	Ref.
1 July 2020	MF	(England) James Craigen	(England) AFC Fylde	Free transfer	
30 July 2020	GK	Scott Gallacher	Airdrieonians	Free transfer	
14 August 2020	FW	Kris Doolan	Greenock Morton	Free transfer	

=== Transfers out ===
Date	Position	Name	From	Fee	Ref.
9 June 2020	MF	Omar Kader	Retired		
6 July 2020	GK	Darren Jamieson	Kelty Hearts	Free transfer	
9 July 2020	MF	(United States) James Murphy	(United States) Rio Grande Valley	Free transfer	

=== Loans in ===
Date	Position	Name	From	End date	Ref.
4 September 2020	MF	(Finland) Miko Virtanen	Aberdeen	1 January 2021	
5 September 2020	FW	Michael Ruth	Aberdeen	1 February 2021	
29 September 2020	MF	Connor Smith	Heart of Midlothian	1 January 2021	
8 January 2021	DF	Jake Davidson	Dundee United	30 May 2021	
13 January 2021	MF	Ben Williamson	Rangers	30 May 2021	
29 January 2021	FW	Jack Hamilton	Livingston	30 May 2021	
1 February 2021	MF	Lewis Moore	Heart of Midlothian	30 May 2021	
24 February 2021	DF	Carlo Pignatiello	Livingston	30 May 2021	
29 March 2021	MF	Nicky Low	East Stirlingshire	30 May 2021	
