= 2019–20 Arbroath F.C. season =

Arbroath
2019–20 season
- Chairman: Mike Caird
- Manager: Dick Campbell
- Stadium: Gayfield Park
- Scottish Championship: 5th
- Scottish League Cup: Group stage
- Scottish Challenge Cup: Fourth round
- Scottish Cup: Fourth round
- Top goalscorer: League: Bobby Linn (6); All: Bobby Linn (8)
- Highest home attendance: 1,733 vs. Falkirk, Scottish Cup, 18 January 2020
- Lowest home attendance: 485 vs. Elgin City, League Cup, 13 July 2019
- Average home league attendance: 1,362
Home colours	Away colours

The 2019–20 season was Arbroath's first season in the Scottish Championship, following promotion from Scottish League One in the 2018–19 season after finishing in 1st place. Arbroath also competed in the Challenge Cup, League Cup and the Scottish Cup. The season was postponed in April 2020, with Arbroath finishing in fifth place, having played 26 games.

== Summary ==
=== Season ===
On 13 March 2020, the Scottish football season was suspended with immediate effect due to the COVID-19 Coronavirus outbreak. On 9 April, the Scottish football season was further suspended until at least 10 June. On 18 May 2020, the SPFL declared the end of the season determining on an average points per game with Arbroath finishing in fifth place and surviving for another season.

== Competitions ==
=== Scottish Championship ===
3 August 2019 1	Arbroath	0–0	Queen of the South	Arbroath
15:00 BST		Report		Stadium: Gayfield Park; Attendance: 1,100; Referee: Gavin Ross

10 August 2019 2	Inverness Caledonian Thistle	2–1	Arbroath	Inverness
15:00 BST	Doran 44'; Donaldson (yellow card) 47'; Storey 82'	Report	Spence (yellow card) 5'; Linn 26'	Stadium: Caledonian Stadium; Attendance: 2,298; Referee: Mike Roncone

24 August 2019 3	Alloa Athletic	0–1	Arbroath	Alloa
15:00 BST	Hetherington (yellow card) 38' (red card) 77'; Flannigan (yellow card) 65'; Stirling (yellow card) 84'	Report	Linn 17'; Whatley (yellow card) 63'; Campbell (yellow card) 88'	Stadium: Recreation Park; Attendance: 661; Referee: Colin Steven

31 August 2019 4	Arbroath	1–0	Dunfermline Athletic	Arbroath
15:00 BST	Spence (yellow card) 21'; Donnelly 50'; Whatley (yellow card) 90+1'	Report	Devine (yellow card) 24'	Stadium: Gayfield Park; Attendance: 1,624; Referee: Steven Kirkland

13 September 2019 5	Arbroath	1–1	Partick Thistle	Arbroath
19:05 BST	Thomson 14' (yellow card) 77'	Report	Penrice (yellow card) 25'; Zanatta (yellow card) 62'; Miller 65'	Stadium: Gayfield Park; Attendance: 1,214; Referee: David Munro

21 September 2019 6	Dundee United	2–1	Arbroath	Dundee
15:00 BST	Stanton (yellow card) 28'; Robson (yellow card) 38'; Butcher (yellow card) 39'; Shankland 88', 90+2' (yellow card) 90+3'	Report	Donnelly 52'	Stadium: Tannadice Park; Attendance: 7,877; Referee: Gavin Duncan

28 September 2019 7	Arbroath	0–3	Ayr United	Arbroath
15:00 BST	McKenna (yellow card) 33'	Report	Forrest 12', 20' Kelly 27'	Stadium: Gayfield Park; Attendance: 1,105; Referee: Grant Irvine

5 October 2019 8	Dundee	2–0	Arbroath	Dundee
15:00 BST	Mackie (yellow card) 30'; McDaid (yellow card) 37' (goal) 38' 59'; Byrne (yellow card) 66'	Report	McKenna (yellow card) 61'; Virtanen (yellow card) 75'; Stirling (yellow card) 81'	Stadium: Kilmac Stadium at Dens Park; Attendance: 5,045; Referee: (Scotland) Alan Newlands

19 October 2019 9	Arbroath	1–0	Greenock Morton	Arbroath
15:00 BST	O'Brien (yellow card) 13'; Linn 74'	Report	Blues (yellow card) 72'	Stadium: Gayfield Park; Attendance: 1,009; Referee: (Scotland) Willie Collum

26 October 2019 10	Partick Thistle	1–3	Arbroath	Glasgow
15:00 BST	Bannigan 59' (pen.); Zanatta (yellow card) 64'	Report	Donnelly 37'; Virtanen (yellow card) 58'; Thomson (yellow card) 72'; McKenna 74' (pen.); Hamilton 77'	Stadium: The Energy Check Stadium; Attendance: 2,793; Referee: (Scotland) Gavin Ross

29 October 2019 11	Dunfermline Athletic	2–0	Arbroath	Dunfermline
19:45 GMT	Ashcroft (yellow card) 22'; Nisbet 59' 78'	Report	O'Brien (yellow card) 22'; Virtanen (yellow card) 33'; Thomson (yellow card) 74'; McKenna (yellow card) 84'	Stadium: East End Park; Attendance: 3,488; Referee: (Scotland) John McKendrick

2 November 2019 12	Arbroath	2–1	Alloa Athletic	Arbroath
15:00 GMT	Linn 16'; Donnelly 27'; Virtanen (yellow card) 67'	Report	Trouten 35' (yellow card) 87'	Stadium: Gayfield Park; Attendance: 921; Referee: (Scotland) Graham Beaton

9 November 2019 13	Arbroath	3–0	Inverness Caledonian Thistle	Arbroath
15:00 GMT	Stewart 28'; Linn 54' (pen.); Kader 86'	Report	Donaldson (yellow card) 38'; Todorov (yellow card) 39'; Tremarco (yellow card) 57'	Stadium: Gayfield Park; Attendance: 1,173; Referee: (Scotland) John Beaton

16 November 2019 14	Greenock Morton	1–0	Arbroath	Greenock
15:00 GMT	Lyon 3'	Report	Murphy (yellow card) 41'; Hamilton (yellow card) 71'; Stirling (yellow card) 86'; Doris (yellow card) 89'	Stadium: Cappielow Park; Attendance: 1,185; Referee: (Scotland) Alan Newlands

7 December 2019 15	Arbroath	1–1	Dundee	Arbroath
15:00 GMT	Little (yellow card) 34'; Linn 37'; Hamilton (yellow card) 60'	Report	Forster (yellow card) 4'; McGhee (yellow card) 50'; Hemmings 61'; Mackie (yellow card) 87'	Stadium: Gayfield Park; Attendance: 2,170; Referee: (Scotland) Alan Newlands

10 December 2019 16	Ayr United	1–1	Arbroath	Ayr
19:45 GMT	Kelly 22'; Moore (yellow card) 77'	Report	McKenna 48' (pen.); Donnelly (yellow card) 78'; Stewart (yellow card) 82'	Stadium: Somerset Park; Attendance: 777; Referee: (Scotland) Colin Steven

14 December 2019 17	Arbroath	0–1	Dundee United	Arbroath
15:00 GMT	Kader (yellow card) 39'; Gaston (yellow card) 54'; Little (yellow card) 74'	Report	Stanton 6'; Shankland (yellow card) 87'	Stadium: Gayfield Park; Attendance: 4,052; Referee: (Scotland) Graham Beaton

21 December 2019 18	Queen of the South	2–0	Arbroath	Dumfries
15:00 GMT	Pybus (yellow card) 24' (goal) 33'; Little 87' (o.g.)	Report	McKenna (yellow card) 68'	Stadium: Palmerston Park; Attendance: 1,094; Referee: (Scotland) Grant Irvine

28 December 2019 19	Inverness Caledonian Thistle	0–1	Arbroath	Inverness
15:00 GMT		Report	Hamilton (yellow card) 20'; Donnelly 47'; Virtanen (yellow card) 76'	Stadium: Caledonian Stadium; Attendance: 2,287; Referee: (Scotland) Graham Beaton

4 January 2020 20	Arbroath	1–2	Greenock Morton	Arbroath
15:00 GMT	Sewart 23'; O'Brien (yellow card) 65'	Report	Sutton 12'; Colville 20'; Jacobs (yellow card) 61'	Stadium: Gayfield Park; Attendance: 1,273; Referee: (Scotland) Gavin Duncan

21 January 2020 21	Alloa Athletic	2–0	Arbroath	Alloa
19:45 GMT	O'Hara 24' 27'	Report		Stadium: The Indodrill Stadium; Attendance: 765; Referee: (Scotland) Craig Napier

25 January 2020 22	Arbroath	2–1	Partick Thistle	Arbroath
15:00 GMT	McKenna 6'; Wighton 34'; Virtanen (yellow card) 90+4'	Report	Graham 90+5'	Stadium: Gayfield Park; Attendance: 1,418; Referee: (Scotland) David Lowe

1 February 2020 23	Dundee United	0–1	Arbroath	Dundee
15:00 GMT	Pawlett (yellow card) 74'	Report	Wighton 26'; Hamilton (yellow card) 40'	Stadium: Tannadice Park; Attendance: 8,056; Referee: (Scotland) Alan Muir (referee)

15 February 2020 24	Arbroath	2–0	Queen of the South	Arbroath
15:00 GMT	Gold 6'; Hilson 35'	Report	Pybus (yellow card) 55'; Holt (yellow card) 79'	Stadium: Gayfield Park; Attendance: 801; Referee: (Scotland) Steven Reid

4 March 2020 25	Arbroath	0–0	Dunfermline Athletic	Arbroath
19:45 GMT	Little (yellow card) 70'	Report	Thomas (yellow card) 16'; Afolabi (yellow card) 90'	Stadium: Gayfield Park; Attendance: 1,146; Referee: John McKendrick

7 March 2020 26	Greenock Morton	1–1	Arbroath	Greenock
15:00 GMT	Cadden (yellow card) 34'; McAlister (yellow card) 90'; McGinty 90+3'	Report	Wighton 49'; Stewart (yellow card) 79'; Hilson (yellow card) 85'	Stadium: Cappielow Park; Attendance: 1,472; Referee: (Scotland) Steven Reid

=== Scottish League Cup ===
==== Group stage ====
13 July 2019 1	Arbroath	2–1	Elgin City	Arbroath
15:00 BST	Kader 44'; Doris 90+2'	Report	Sutherland 29'	Stadium: Gayfield Park; Attendance: 485; Referee: Graham Beaton

17 July 2019 2	Stirling Albion	1–6	Arbroath	Stirling
19:45 BST	Mackin 47'	Report	Gold 1', 57'; McKenna 28'; Hamilton 82'; Spence 87', 90'	Stadium: Forthbank Stadium; Attendance: 474; Referee: Craig Napier

23 July 2019 3	Hibernian	3–0	Arbroath	Edinburgh
19:45 BST	Kamberi 3'; Allan 44' (pen.); Murray 87'	Report		Stadium: Easter Road; Attendance: 4,769; Referee: Bobby Madden

27 July 2019 4	Arbroath	2–3	Alloa Athletic	Arbroath
15:00 BST	Linn 18'; Thomson 74'	Report	Buchanan 18'; Trouten 51', 78'	Stadium: Gayfield Park; Attendance: 590; Referee: Barry Cook

=== Scottish Challenge Cup ===
7 September 2019 Third round	Dundee United	0–0 (3–4 p)	Arbroath	Dundee
15:00		Report		Stadium: Tannadice Park; Attendance: 2,568; Referee: David Lowe

12 October 2019 Fourth round	Arbroath	0–2	Clyde	Arbroath
15:00		Report	Johnston 9'; Little 68 o.g.'	Stadium: Gayfield Park; Attendance: 806; Referee: David Lowe

=== Scottish Cup ===
23 November 2019 Third round	Auchinleck Talbot	1–1	Arbroath	Auchinleck
15:00 GMT	Hyslop 11'	Summary	McKenna 84' (pen.)	Stadium: Beechwood Park; Attendance: 921; Referee: (Scotland) David Lowe

27 November 2019 Third round replay	Arbroath	3–0	Auchinleck Talbot	Arbroath
19:45 GMT	McKenna 26'; Linn 54'; Stewart 64'	Summary		Stadium: Gayfield Park; Attendance: 1,022; Referee: (Scotland) David Lowe

18 January 2020 Fourth round	Arbroath	0–0	Falkirk	Arbroath
15:00 GMT	Whatley (yellow card) 75'; Virtanen (yellow card) 77'; McKenna (yellow card) 79'	Summary	Durnan (yellow card) 40'; Dixon (yellow card) 90+2'	Stadium: Gayfield Park; Attendance: 1,733; Referee: (Scotland) Greg Aitken

28 January 2020 Fourth round replay	Falkirk	2–0	Arbroath	Falkirk
19:45 GMT	McManus 47'; Sammon 66'; Doyle (yellow card) 77'	Report	Donnelly (yellow card) 61'	Stadium: Falkirk Stadium; Attendance: 2,704; Referee: (Scotland) Euan Anderson

== Player statistics ==
=== Appearances and goals ===
As of 7 March 2020

No.	Pos	Player	Championship		League Cup		Challenge Cup		Scottish Cup		Total	
No.	Pos	Player	Apps	Goals	Apps	Goals	Apps	Goals	Apps	Goals	Apps	Goals
1	GK	(Scotland) Darren Jamieson	7	0	2	0	2	0	3	0	14	0
2	DF	(Scotland) Jason Thomson	17+1	1	4	1	1	0	2	0	25	2
3	DF	(Scotland) Colin Hamilton	26	1	4	1	1	0	4	0	35	2
4	DF	(Scotland) Ricky Little	26	0	2	0	2	0	4	0	34	0
5	DF	(Scotland) Thomas O'Brien	25	0	4	0	2	0	4	0	35	0
6	MF	(Scotland) Mark Whatley	22	1	3	0	2	0	4	0	31	1
7	MF	(Scotland) David Gold	17+3	1	3+1	2	1+1	0	2+1	0	29	3
8	MF	(Scotland) Michael McKenna	15+7	3	2+2	1	2	0	4	2	32	6
9	FW	(Scotland) Dale Hilson	6	1	0	0	0	0	0	0	6	1
10	MF	(Scotland) Gavin Swankie	3+3	0	3	0	0	0	0+1	0	10	0
11	MF	(Scotland) Bobby Linn	21+2	6	4	1	0+2	0	4	1	33	8
12	MF	(Scotland) Omar Kader	4+15	1	2+2	1	2	0	1+2	0	28	2
14	FW	(Scotland) Craig Wighton	5	3	0	0	0	0	0	0	5	3
15	FW	(Scotland) Luke Donnelly	14+7	5	0+1	0	1+1	0	4	0	28	5
16	DF	(Scotland) Scott Stewart	15+2	2	0+2	0	0	0	2+2	1	23	3
18	MF	(United States) James Murphy	10+7	0	1+1	0	1+1	0	1	0	22	0
19	DF	(Scotland) Ben Stirling	4+2	0	0	0	2	0	0	0	8	0
20	MF	(Scotland) Josh Campbell	2+7	0	0	0	0	0	0+2	0	11	0
21	GK	(Scotland) Derek Gaston	19	0	2	0	0	0	1	0	22	0
22	MF	(Finland) Miko Virtanen	18+2	0	0	0	0	0	3	0	23	0
23	MF	(Scotland) Logan Chalmers	0+1	0	0	0	0	0	0+2	0	3	0
32	MF	(England) James Craigen	1+3	0	0	0	0	0	0	0	4	0
Players who left the club during the 2019–20 season
9	FW	(Scotland) Steven Doris	3+9	0	4	1	2	0	0	0	18	1
14	FW	(Scotland) Greig Spence	5+6	0	2+2	2	0	0	1+1	0	17	2
17	DF	(Scotland) Robert Wilson	1	0	2	0	0	0	0	0	3	0
19	DF	(Scotland) Ben Stirling	4+2	0	0	0	2	0	0	0	8	0
20	MF	(Scotland) Josh Campbell	2+7	0	0	0	0	0	0+2	0	11	0

== Team statistics ==
=== League table ===
Pos	Team	Pld	W	D	L	GF	GA	GD	Pts	PPG	Promotion, qualification or relegation (Note: All play-off matches were cancelled, as clubs voted to curtail the season due to the COVID-19 pandemic in Scotland.)
3	Dundee	27	11	8	8	32	31	+1	41	1.52	
4	Ayr United	27	12	4	11	38	35	+3	40	1.48	
5	Arbroath	26	10	6	10	24	26	−2	36	1.38	
6	Dunfermline Athletic	28	10	7	11	41	36	+5	37	1.32	
7	Greenock Morton	28	10	6	12	45	52	−7	36	1.29	

Source: SPFL
Rules for classification: 1) Points per game.

=== League Cup table ===
Pos	Team	Pld	W	PW	PL	L	GF	GA	GD	Pts	Qualification	HIB	ALO	ARB	ELG	STI
1	Hibernian	4	3	1	0	0	8	1	+7	11	Qualification for the Second Round	—	2–0	3–0	—	—
2	Alloa Athletic	4	2	0	1	1	8	8	0	7		—	—	—	3–3p	2–1
3	Arbroath	4	2	0	0	2	10	8	+2	6		—	2–3	—	2–1	—
4	Elgin City	4	1	1	0	2	7	7	0	5		0–2	—	—	—	3–0
5	Stirling Albion	4	0	0	1	3	3	12	−9	1		1–1p	—	1–6	—	—

Rules for classification: 1) goal difference, 2) goals scored, 3) away goals scored, 4) matches won, 5) away matches won, 6) drawing of lots.

== Transfers ==
=== Transfers in ===
Date	Position	Name	From	Fee	Ref.
1 July 2019	GK`	Derek Gaston	Greenock Morton	Free transfer	
1 July 2019	MF	Scott Stewart	Airdrieonians	Free transfer	
8 July 2019	DF	Robert Wilson	Berwick Rangers	Free transfer	
17 July 2019	MF	(United States) James Murphy	Free agent	Free transfer	
18 January 2020	FW	Dale Hilson	Forfar Athletic	Free transfer	

=== Transfers out ===
Date	Position	Name	To	Fee	Ref.
9 June 2019	MF	Ryan McCord	Brechin City	Free transfer	
1 July 2019	GK	Darren Hill	Cumbernauld United	Free transfer	
1 July 2019	FW	Ryan Wallace	East Fife	Free transfer	
31 July 2019	MF	Danny Denholm	East Fife	Free transfer	
10 January 2020	FW	Greig Spence	Stenhousemuir	Free transfer	
10 January 2020	DF	Robert Wilson	Stenhousemuir	Free transfer	
18 January 2020	FW	Steven Doris	Forfar Athletic	Free transfer	

=== Loans in ===
Date	Position	Name	From	End date	Ref.
23 August 2019	DF	Ben Stirling	Hibernian	6 January 2020	
23 August 2019	MF	Josh Campbell	Hibernian	6 January 2020	
29 August 2019	MF	(Finland) Miko Virtanen	Aberdeen	31 May 2020	
10 January 2020	FW	Logan Chalmers	Dundee United	31 May 2020	
23 January 2020	FW	Craig Wighton	Heart of Midlothian	31 May 2020	
31 January 2020	MF	(England) James Craigen	(England) AFC Fylde	31 May 2020	
