= 2020–21 Aberdeen F.C. season =

Aberdeen
2020–21 season
- Chairman: Dave Cormack
- Manager: Derek McInnes (until 8 March); Paul Sheerin (interim) (from 8 March to 23 March); Stephen Glass (from 23 March)
- Ground: Pittodrie Stadium
- Scottish Premiership: 4th
- Scottish Cup: Quarter-finals
- Scottish League Cup: Second round
- Europa League: Third qualifying round
- Top goalscorer: League: Lewis Ferguson (9); All: Lewis Ferguson (10)
- Highest home attendance: 300 vs Kilmarnock; 12 September 2020
Home colours	Away colours

The 2020–21 Aberdeen F.C. season was Aberdeen's 108th season in the top flight of Scottish football and the eighth in the Scottish Premiership. Aberdeen also competed in the Scottish Cup, the League Cup and in qualifying for the Europa League.

== Summary ==
=== May ===
The kits were released for the season on 21 May.

=== June ===
On 10 June, after nine years at the club goalkeeper Danny Rogers officially left the club after making the announcement via his Twitter account. On 12 June, the club announced the departures of Frank Ross, development squad players Sam Jackson, Luc Bollan, Lloyd Robertson, Sebastian Ross, Jack Chesser, Sean Linden and Chris Antoniazzi, David Dangana and youth players Kieran Shanks and Kyle Dalling. On 15 June, the first team returned to training under strict guidelines due to the pandemic. On 17 June, Aberdeen's qualification for the Europa League qualifying rounds was confirmed by UEFA with one-off matches to be played. On 18 June, the club announced talks of temporary wage cuts to players and staff. On 23 June, after his contract expired after three years at Celtic, Irish winger Jonny Hayes rejoined the Dons on a two-year deal. He also took a significant wage cut.

=== July ===
It was announced a first team player had tested positive for COVID-19 but it was undisclosed who the player was and that he was asymptomatic. On 2 July, Czech goalkeeper Tomáš Černý signed a new one-year deal. On 6 July, the Premiership fixtures were published, with the Dons kicking off at home to Rangers live on Sky Sports with the game to be played behind closed doors according to Scottish government guidelines. Sam Cosgrove turned down a £2m move to French Second Division side Guingamp. On 11 July, Aberdeen played a friendly match against fellow Scottish Premiership side Ross County at Cormack Park with a 2–2 draw and Bruce Anderson scored both goals. The kick-off time for the opening Rangers match was brought forward five hours by Sky Sports. The Dons then lost a friendly at Pittodrie to St Johnstone with Anderson again scoring. Pre-season ended with a 1–1 draw against Hibernian at Pittodrie with Craig Bryson on target. Sam Cosgrove was announced to be out injured for "eight to ten weeks". The squad numbers for the season was also revealed by the club. On 31 July, Ryan Edmondson joined from Leeds United on loan and Tommie Hoban signed a contract until January.

=== August ===
The Dons began their Premiership campaign with a 1–0 loss at home to Rangers which also saw Andrew Considine sent off late on. A few days later, it was revealed that eight first-team players were self-isolating after two of them had tested positive for COVID-19 after they had been on a night out after the Rangers match. The game was later postponed until 20 August and the Livingston match put back twenty-four hours, with manager Derek McInnes and also Scottish Government leader Nicola Sturgeon very critical of the players because of their actions. Furthermore, the following matches against both Hamilton Academical and Celtic were also postponed. On 12 August, the club announced loan player Ryan Edmondson had been ruled out for three to four months with an ankle injury and returned to parent club Leeds United to see a specialist. All eight players involved in breaking lockdown rules were 'heavily fined' by the club and were later given a three-match suspended ban. On 18 August, Ross McCrorie signed from bitter Premiership rivals Rangers initially on a one-year loan due to financial issues at the club with an obligation to buy for a reported fee of around £350,000 on a three-year deal, after rejecting the chance to sign for Hibs. Aberdeen got their first win of the season by beating St Johnstone in their second League match after waiting nineteen days with a Ryan Hedges deflected goal. After his release, youngster Frank Ross signed Dutch Ereste Divisie side Go Ahead Eagles. Aberdeen also learned they would face Faroese side NSÍ Runavík in the first round of Qualifying for the Europa League. Welsh striker Marley Watkins signed on loan from Bristol City until January. The Dons had another win, this time at home to Livingston with Scott Wright and Ryan Hedges linking up well for the second goal. Aberdeen beat Faroese part timers NSÍ Runavík scoring six goals and with Hedges this time scoring a hat-trick after coming on as a sub, they progressed through to the next round of qualifying where they were drawn to face Viking of Norway. They ended the month at Easter Road against Hibs by dominating the match but only winning with a penalty from Lewis Ferguson.

=== September ===
Scott McKenna played in both Scotland matches against Israel and Czech Republic. Meanwhile, both Miko Virtanen and Michael Ruth joined Arbroath on loan until the end of the season. Also chairman Dave Cormack hoped that fans would be allowed back into the stadium as test events with 300 at Kilmarnock and 750 at Motherwell home matches. 300 fans were allowed in to watch the Dons beat Kilmarnock with Ross McCrorie's first goal for the club separating the sides. On 9 September, midfielder Craig Bryson left the club via mutual consent. He went on to join St Johnstone. They continued in Europe with a fine 2–0 Viking in Norway, with Hedgy scoring directly from a corner. However, the Dons returned home and individual errors cost them in the first half leading to a 3–0 defeat to Motherwell, where also no fans were present due to an increase in Covid numbers. Three youngsters Connor Power, Luke Turner and Tyler Mykyta joined Highland Football League side Turriff United on loan for the season. On 23 September, Scott McKenna joined English Championship side Nottingham Forest for a fee rumored to be around £3,000,000 with add-ons rising to £2,000,000, a club-record fee. The Dons then travelled to Portugal to play Sporting CP, where ten positive Covid cases were recorded within the Sporting CP squad including their manager and all were isolating. The assistant manager would take over for the match The Dons went on to lose the match, losing at this stage for the sixth time in seven seasons. They got back to Premiership action with a 3–0 win against ten-man Ross County with Marley Watkins scoring his first goal for the club.

=== October ===
Aberdeen continued in the league with a 2–1 home win against the Buddies, with the Dons coming from behind to win with a last-minute goal. Ethan Ross signed for Raith Rovers on a season loan. The following day, youngster Jack Mackenzie joined Forfar on loan for the season. Greg Leigh rejoined the club on deadline day, this time permananety from NAC Breda after his release. Gary Woods joined the club on loan from English League Two side Oldham Athletic initially for three months after an injury to back-up goalie Tomas Cerny. Having made thirty-seven appearances for the club, striker Bruce Anderson left on loan to join Ayr for the season. Lewis Ferguson, Connor McLennan & Ross McCrorie, Niall McGinn, Ronny Hernandez, Connor Barron and Ryan Duncan were all called up for their countries for the latest round of International matches. McCrorie scored for the Under 21s and McGinn scored for Northern Ireland in Bosnia. After the Scotland match, it was announced that both McCrorie and Andrew Considine were called up to play Slovakia. Considine went on to make his debut, and at the age of 33 he became the oldest to do so since 1967. McLennan also scored for the Under 21s in San Marino. Defender Tommie Hoban extended his deal until the end of the season. Aberdeen returned to league action at Dundee United and dominated but could not find the net in a scoreless draw. However they got back to winning ways putting four past Hamilton Academical in their rearranged match, moving up to third in the table. On 23 October, former manager Ebbe Skovdahl died aged 75. There was a minute silence before the match against Celtic which ended in a thrilling 3–3 draw.

=== November ===
The Dons beat their nearest league rivals Hibernian 2–0 to jump them to third in the table. Aberdeen were drawn to play St Mirren in the League Cup. For the November Internationals, Andrew Considine, Connor McLennan, Ross McCrorie and Lewis Ferguson, Niall McGinn (injured his calf), Matty Kennedy and Greg Leigh were all called up for their countries for the latest round of International matches. However whilst on duty, McCrorie tested positive for COVID-19 so he along with McLennan and Ferguson had to self-isolate. Scott Wright picked up a groin injury and he also missed the match at Ibrox against Rangers which the Dons lost 4–0. 16-year-old Ryan Duncan made his debut in the match. They failed to win at Hamilton Academical and were knocked out of the League Cup by St Mirren due to a late error by goalkeeper Joe Lewis.

=== December ===
Form did not improve at the start of December, again failing to beat St Mirren. Midfielder Lewis Ferguson was "harshly" sent off in the match. Defender Michael Devlin, who had just come back from injury, was ruled out for three months. Defender Andrew Considine signed a new contract keeping him at the club until summer of 2022. Former defender Chic McLelland died on Boxing Day aged 63. The Dons form improved and went unbeaten throughout the whole of the month but their final game of the year away to Livingston was postponed due to a frozen pitch. It was initially rescheduled for 13 January.

=== January ===
The year started with a frustrating goalless draw against Dundee United, with McInnes stating he 'expects more'. Youngster Calvin Ramsay signed a new contract until 2024. Bruce Anderson and Miko Virtanen were recalled from their respective loan spells. Greg Leigh extended his contract to stay at the club until the end of the season. Aberdeen were drawn in the third round of the Scottish Cup to play either Dumbarton or Huntly away from home. The Dons played Rangers at home and lost, finishing the match with ten men as Ryan Hedges was sent off and given a two match ban. Gary Woods extended his loan deal until the end of the season. Ryan Edmondson returned to Leeds United. The away match to Livingston was postponed again only minutes after it was supposed to kick off due to heavy rainfall. Goalkeeper Tomáš Černý left the club and announced his retirement from football. Aberdeen were then hammered away to Ross County losing 4–1. Jonny Hayes and Ash Taylor were both injured in the match but recovered, Ross McCrorie was also injured and ruled out for three weeks. The Dons seen off ten-man Motherwell winning 2–0. Miko Virtanen made his first team debut. Scott Wright rejected a new deal and initially signed a pre-contract for Premiership rivals Rangers. St Johnstone then held the Dons to a 'dull' goalless draw. Funso Ojo joined Wigan Athletic on loan until the end of the season. Attacker Connor McLennan signed on until Summer 2023. Ethan Ross was recalled from his loan with Raith Rovers. In the rearranged match with Livingston, it ended in another goalless draw. The following day, striker Sam Cosgrove signed for English Championship club Birmingham City for a rumoured fee of £2,000,000.

=== February ===
On deadline day, strikers Fraser Hornby from French Ligue 1 side Reims and Callum Hendry from fellow Premiership side St Johnstone both joined the club until the end of the season. Another striker Bruce Anderson was loaned out again but to fellow Premiership side Hamilton Academical. Fellow striker Curtis Main left the club and joined English Football League side Shrewsbury Town. Former Hibernian and Rangers striker Flo Kamberi signed on loan from Swiss Super League side St Gallen, subject to International clearance. Michael Ruth, Jack MacKenzie, Luke Turner & Conor Power were all recalled from their respective loan spells. And finally, Ross McCrorie made his £350,000 move permanent early after a fee reported to be £175,000 was accepted for the permanent transfer of Scott Wright to Rangers. Livingston won at Pittodrie for the first time since 2004, beating the Dons 2–0. Attacker Ryan Hedges was injured in the match and a few days later, ruled out until the end of the season. Aberdeen then lost 2–0 again this time away to fellow European chasers Hibernian. In the match, Greg Leigh pulled up with a hamstring injury and Connor McLennan was subbed on but then later subbed off. Chairman Dave Cormack met McInnes after the match and insisted they were 'fully behind' the manager. The goalless run continued with a home draw against St Mirren. Florian Kamberi made his debut in the match becoming the first Swiss and Albanian to play for the Dons. After the match, chairman Dave Cormack cancelled a planned Q&A with fans, citing his backing for the manager. Venezuelan defender Ronald Hernández joined affiliated club Atlanta United for the duration of the MLS Season. For the first time in their history, Aberdeen failed to score a goal in six matches after a narrow 1–0 defeat to Celtic. However, the goal drought was ended by Callum Hendry in a narrow 1–0 home win against Kilmarnock.

=== March ===
Derek McInnes left the club by mutual consent on 8 March after eight years in charge. First team coach Paul Sheerin took over as interim manager for the 1–0 defeat at Dundee United. On 23 March, Stephen Glass took over as manager.

=== April ===
Glass' first official match in charge seen the Dons win against Livingston in an entertaining Scottish Cup match, having only taken training for three days. However, the Dons were beaten 3–0 by Dundee United in the following round who put in a "Fantastic performance" to see them knocked out in the Quarter final stages.

=== May ===
The Dons ended the season in Fourth place with the majority of the season played behind closed doors.

== Results & fixtures ==
Win Draw Loss Postponed

=== Pre-season ===
11 July 2020 Friendly	Aberdeen	2–2	Ross County	Aberdeen
	Anderson		Charles-Cook; Mckay	Stadium: Cormack Park

21 July 2020 Friendly	Aberdeen	1–2	St Johnstone	Aberdeen
	Anderson 81'		Tanser 75' (pen.), 80'	Stadium: Pittodrie Stadium

25 July 2020 Friendly	Aberdeen	1–1	Hibernian	Aberdeen
	Bryson 54'		Horgan 88'	Stadium: Pittodrie Stadium

=== Scottish Premiership ===
1 August 2020 1	Aberdeen	0–1	Rangers	Pittodrie Stadium
12:30 BST	Ojo (yellow card) 45'; Considine (red card) 86'	Report	Kent 21'	Referee: Bobby Madden
Note: Game televised on Sky Sports Football

20 August 2020 2 (Note: Rearranged match after postponement)	St Johnstone	0−1	Aberdeen	McDiarmid Park
19:30 BST	Craig (yellow card) 88'	Report	Ferguson (yellow card) 53'; Hedges 82', (yellow card) 88'; McCrorie (yellow card) 89'	Referee: Willie Collum
Note: Game televised on Sky Sports Football. Rearranged match after initial postponement

23 August 2020 5	Aberdeen	2−1	Livingston	Pittodrie Stadium
15:00 BST	Ferguson 49'; Wright 55'	Report	Sibbald (yellow card) 42'; Devlin (yellow card) 43'; Pittman 69'	Referee: Steven McLean

30 August 2020 6	Hibernian	0−1	Aberdeen	Easter Road
16:30 BST		Report	Ferguson 39' (pen.), (yellow card) 54'	Referee: Nick Walsh
Note: Game televised on Sky Sports Football.

12 September 2020 7	Aberdeen	1−0	Kilmarnock	Pittodrie Stadium
15:00 BST	McCrorie 16'	Report	Kabamba (yellow card) 50'	Attendance: 300; Referee: Bobby Madden

20 September 2020 8	Aberdeen	0−3	Motherwell	Pittodrie Stadium
15:00 BST	Logan (yellow card) 47'; McCrorie (yellow card) 56'; Ferguson (yellow card) 71'	Report	O'Hara 4' (pen.); Long 8'; Mugabi 22'	Attendance: 0 Referee: John Beaton

27 September 2020 9	Ross County	0−3	Aberdeen	Global Energy Stadium
15:00 BST	Vigurs (red card) 60'	Report	Watkins 42'; Ferguson 60' (pen.), 76' (pen.)	Referee: Willie Collum

2 October 2020 10	Aberdeen	2−1	St Mirren	Pittodrie Stadium
19:45 BST	Watkins 71'; McCrorie (yellow card) 88'; Ferguson 90+1'	Report	Erhahon 54'	Referee: Gavin Duncan

17 October 2020 11	Dundee United	0−0	Aberdeen	Tannadice Park
15:00 BST	Butcher (yellow card) 65'	Report	McCrorie (yellow card) 77'; Hayes (yellow card) 87'	Referee: Alan Muir

20 October 2020 3	Aberdeen	4−2	Hamilton Academical	Pittodrie Stadium
19:00 BST	Hoban 14'; Ferguson 21'; Edmondson 24', 31'; McLennan (yellow card) 86'	Report	Moyo 32'; Callachan 68' (pen.); Odoffin (yellow card) 90+1'	Referee: Nick Walsh

25 October 2020 12	Aberdeen	3−3	Celtic	Pittodrie Stadium
12:00 GMT	Ferguson (yellow card) 13', (goal) 43' (pen.), 90+2' (pen.); McCrorie (yellow card) 52'; Hedges 65'	Report	McGregor (yellow card) 9', (goal) 52'; Griffiths 76'; Christie 78' (pen.)	Referee: Willie Collum
Note: Game televised on Sky Sports.

6 November 2020 14	Aberdeen	2−0	Hibernian	Pittodrie Stadium
19:45 GMT	Wright 5'; Cosgrove 12'	Report		Referee: Euan Anderson

22 November 2020 15	Rangers	4−0	Aberdeen	Ibrox Stadium
12:00 GMT	Kent 15'; Roofe 29'; Arfield 49'; Tavernier 53' (pen.)	Report	Considine (yellow card) 52'	Referee: Nick Walsh
Note: Game televised on Sky Sports.

25 November 2020 13	Hamilton Academical	1−1	Aberdeen	New Douglas Park
19:00 GMT	Ogkmpoe 49'	Report	Hedges 19'	Referee: Gavin Duncan

5 December 2020 16	St Mirren	1−1	Aberdeen	St Mirren Park
15:00 GMT	McGrath 44' (pen.)	Report	Hayes 37'; Ferguson (red card) 51'	Referee: Bobby Madden

12 December 2020 17	Aberdeen	2−0	Ross County	Pittodrie Stadium
15:00 GMT	Main 5', 57'	Report		Referee: Nick Walsh

20 December 2020 18	Kilmarnock	0−2	Aberdeen	Rugby Park
12:00 GMT	Haunstrup (red card) 90+5'	Report	Hedges 52'; Cosgrove 90+6'	Referee: Andrew Dallas

23 December 2020 19	Motherwell	0−0	Aberdeen	Fir Park
18:15 GMT		Report	Kennedy (yellow card) 89'	Referee: Greg Aitken

26 December 2020 20	Aberdeen	2−1	St Johnstone	Pittodrie Stadium
15:00 GMT	Cosgrove 45+2' (pen.) (yellow card) 83'; Taylor 54'	Report	Gordon 38'; McCann (yellow card) 57'; Craig (yellow card) 62'; Hendry (yellow card) 81' (yellow-red card) 90'	Referee: Nick Walsh

2 January 2021 22	Aberdeen	0−0	Dundee United	Pittodrie Stadium
15:00GMT	Hayes (yellow card) 66'	Report	Clark (yellow card) 41'; Appéré (yellow card) 80'	Referee: Kevin Clancy

10 January 2021 23	Aberdeen	1−2	Rangers	Pittodrie Stadium
15:00GMT	Hedges (red card) 26'; Main (yellow card) 41'; Kennedy 67'; Ferguson (yellow card) 81'	Report	Tavernier (penalty missed) 28', (yellow card) 40'; Morelos 32', 50'	Referee: John Beaton
Note: Game televised on Sky Sports.

16 January 2021 24	Ross County	4–1	Aberdeen	Global Energy Stadium
15:00 GMT	Shaw 1', 84'; Lakin 20'; Hylton 90+3'	Report	Iacovitti 45+1' (o.g.)	Referee: Bobby Madden

23 January 2021 25	Aberdeen	2–0	Motherwell	Pittodrie Stadium
15:00 GMT	Hoban 15'; Wright (yellow card) 26'; Ojo (yellow card) 27'; Considine 77'	Report	Gallagher (yellow card) 5'; Polworth (yellow card) 26' (red card) 48'	Referee: Craig Napier

27 January 2021 26	St Johnstone	0–0	Aberdeen	McDiarmid Park
18:00 GMT	Gordon (yellow card) 81'	Report	Considine (yellow card) 24'	Referee: Don Robertson

30 January 2021 21	Livingston	0–0	Aberdeen	Tony Macaroni Arena
15:00 GMT	Holt (yellow card) 85'	Report		Referee: Steven McLean

2 February 2021 27	Aberdeen	0−2	Livingston	Pittodrie Stadium
18:00 GMT	Ferguson (yellow card) 32'; Hoban (yellow card) 77'	Report	Lewis 7' (o.g.); Devlin 16'; Longridge (yellow card) 44'	Referee: Nick Walsh

6 February 2021 28	Hibernian	2–0	Aberdeen	Easter Road
15:00 GMT	Boyle 27' (pen.), 67'	Report		Referee: Willie Collum

13 February 2021 29	Aberdeen	0–0	St Mirren	Pittodrie Stadium
15:00 GMT	Campbell (yellow card) 86'	BBC Report		Referee: Euan Anderson

17 February 2021 4	Celtic	1–0	Aberdeen	Celtic Park
18:00 GMT	Turnbull 14'	BBC Report	Hendry (yellow card) 83'; Ferguson (yellow card) 88'	Referee: Alan Muir

20 February 2021 33	Aberdeen	1–0	Kilmarnock	Pittodrie Stadium
15:00 GMT	Hendry 21'; McGinn (yellow card) 51'	Report	Dabo (yellow card) 40'; McGowan (yellow card) 62'	Referee: Don Robertson

27 February 2021 30	Celtic	1–0	Aberdeen	Glasgow
15:00 GMT	Édouard 8'	Report	McLennan (yellow card) 41'	Stadium: Celtic Park; Attendance: 0 Referee: Willie Collum

6 March 2021 31	Aberdeen	0–0	Hamilton Academical	Aberdeen
15:00 GMT	Hoban (yellow card) 58'; Considine (yellow card) 65'	Report	McMann (yellow card) 90+7'	Stadium: Pittodrie Stadium; Attendance: 0 Referee: Bobby Madden

20 March 2021 32	Dundee United	1–0	Aberdeen	Tannadice Park
15:00 GMT	Sporle 61'	Report	Ferguson (yellow card) 44'	Attendance: 0 Referee: Greg Aitken

10 April 2021 34	St Johnstone	0–1	Aberdeen	McDiarmid Park
15:00 BST		Report	Hayes 52'	Referee: John Beaton

21 April 2021 35	Aberdeen	1–1	Celtic	Pittodrie Stadium
19:45 BST	Ferguson 18'	Report	Griffiths 90+3'	Referee: Willie Collum

1 May 2021 36	Livingston	1–2	Aberdeen	Tony Macaroni Arena
15:00 GMT	Emmanuel-Thomas 80'	Report	Hendry 52'; Hedges 74'	Referee: Grant Irvine

12 May 2021 37	Aberdeen	0–1	Hibernian	Pittodrie Stadium
19:45 BST		Report	Doidge 41'	Referee: John Beaton

15 May 2021 38	Rangers	4–0	Aberdeen	Ibrox Stadium
12:30 BST	Lewis 5' (o.g.); Roofe 34', 60'; Defoe 88'	Report		Referee: Nick Walsh

=== Scottish League Cup ===
- Aberdeen received a bye into the Second Round as they had qualified for Europe from the previous season. They were drawn to play St Mirren. However, they were knocked out by the Paisley outfit due to a late error by goalkeeper Joe Lewis.

28 November 2020 Second round	St Mirren	2−1	Aberdeen	St Mirren Park
17:15 GMT	Durmuş 4'; McGrath 88'		McGinn 43'	Referee: Don Robertson
Note: Game televised on Premier Sports.

=== Scottish Cup ===
- Aberdeen entered the Third Round of the Scottish Cup and were drawn to play either Dumbarton or Huntly away from home. The Cup was temporarily suspended until March 2021. Dumbarton won the tie and the match was chosen for television coverage on the BBC.

2 April 2021 Third round	Dumbarton	0–1	Aberdeen	Dumbarton Football Stadium
12:15 BST	https://www.scottishfa.co.uk/scottish-cup-matches/?mid=251068		Hendry 84'	Referee: Don Robertson
Note: Game televised on BBC One Scotland

17 April 2021 Fourth Round	Aberdeen	2–2 (a.e.t.) (5–3 p)	Livingston	Aberdeen
17:30	McGinn 77'; Kamberi 95'		Emmanuel-Thomas 37', 93' (pen.)	Stadium: Pittodrie Stadium; Referee: Colin Steven
	Penalties
	Ferguson (penalty scored); Kamberi (penalty scored); Hendry (penalty scored); Campbell (penalty scored); McCrorie (penalty scored)		Lithgow (penalty scored); Holt (penalty missed); Emmanuel-Thomas (penalty scored); Taylor-Sinclair (penalty scored)

25 April 2021 Quarter final	Aberdeen	0–3	Dundee United	Aberdeen
14:30			McNulty 18', 54'; Edwards 37'	Stadium: Pittodrie Stadium; Referee: Kevin Clancy

=== UEFA Europa League ===
==== Qualifying rounds ====
27 August 2020 1QR	Aberdeen (Scotland)	6−0	(Faroe Islands) NSÍ Runavík	Aberdeen, Scotland
19:45 BST	Ferguson 37'; Main 43'; Hedges 50', 59', 87' (pen.); Hayes 60'	Report	Davidsen (yellow card) 34'; Højgaard (yellow card) 88'	Stadium: Pittodrie Stadium; Attendance: N/A; Referee: Ívar Orri Kristjánsson (Iceland)
Note: Game televised on Premier Sports.

17 September 2020 2QR	Viking (Norway)	0−2	(Scotland) Aberdeen	Stavanger, Norway
19:30 BST		Report	McCrorie 45+1'; Considine (yellow card) 72'; Hedges 78'	Stadium: Viking Stadion; Attendance: N/A; Referee: Filip Glova (Slovakia)

24 September 2020 3QR	Sporting CP (Portugal)	1−0	(Scotland) Aberdeen	Lisbon, Portugal
20:00 BST	Tomás 7', (yellow card) 64'; Vietto (yellow card) 30'	Report	Ferguson (yellow card) 90+3'	Stadium: Estádio José Alvalade; Attendance: N/A; Referee: Nikola Dabanović (Montenegro)

== Squad statistics ==
Note: Statistics for the delayed 2019–20 Scottish Cup semi-final played on 1 November 2020 are recorded under the 2019–20 Aberdeen F.C. season article (they are recorded under the 2020–21 season by some resources).

=== Appearances ===
As of 15 May 2021

No.	Pos	Player	Premiership		League Cup		Scottish Cup		Europa League		Total	
No.	Pos	Player	Apps	Goals	Apps	Goals	Apps	Goals	Apps	Goals	Apps	Goals
1	GK	(England) Joe Lewis (c)	35	0	1	0	1	0	3	0	40	0
3	DF	(Republic of Ireland) Tommie Hoban	35+2	2	1	0	2	0	2	0	42	2
4	DF	(Scotland) Andrew Considine	36	1	1	0	2	0	3	0	42	1
5	DF	(Jamaica) Greg Leigh	6+2	0	1	0	0	0	0	0	9	0
6	DF	(Scotland) Michael Devlin	0+1	0	0+1	0	0	0	0	0	2	0
7	FW	(Scotland) Fraser Hornby	5+5	0	0	0	1	0	0	0	11	0
9	FW	(Scotland) Callum Hendry	5+7	2	0	0	1+1	0	0	0	14	2
10	MF	(Northern Ireland) Niall McGinn	11+13	0	1	1	2	0	0+1	0	28	1
11	MF	(Wales) Ryan Hedges	25+3	5	1	0	0	0	2+1	4	32	9
14	DF	(Wales) Ash Taylor	30+1	1	0	0	0	0	1	0	32	1
15	MF	(Scotland) Dylan McGeouch	7+8	0	0	0	0+1	0	3	0	19	0
17	MF	(Republic of Ireland) Jonny Hayes	34	2	1	0	2	0	3	1	40	3
18	FW	(Scotland) Connor McLennan	13+14	0	0	0	1	0	0	0	28	0
19	MF	(Scotland) Lewis Ferguson	35	9	0	0	2	0	3	1	40	10
22	FW	(Albania) Florian Kamberi	11	0	0	0	1+1	0	0	0	13	0
23	MF	(Scotland) Ethan Ross	0+2	0	0	0	0+2	0	0	0	4	0
24	MF	(Scotland) Dean Campbell	12+8	0	1	0	2	0	0	0	23	0
26	MF	(Finland) Miko Virtanen	0+2	0	0	0	0	0	0	0	2	0
27	MF	(Scotland) Mark Gallagher	0	0	0	0	0	0	0	0	0	0
28	FW	(Scotland) Michael Ruth	0+1	0	0	0	0+1	0	0	0	2	0
29	DF	(Scotland) Jack MacKenzie	5+1	0	0	0	0	0	0	0	6	0
30	GK	(Scotland) Tom Ritchie	0	0	0	0	0	0	0	0	0	0
33	FW	(Northern Ireland) Matty Kennedy	22+9	1	1	0	2	0	1	0	35	1
40	MF	(Scotland) Ross McCrorie	28+1	1	0	0	1	0	3	1	33	2
43	GK	(England) Gary Woods	3	0	0	0	1+1	0	0	0	5	0
44	DF	(Scotland) Calvin Ramsay	0+4	0	0	0	1	0	0	0	5	0
46	MF	(Scotland) Ryan Duncan	0+1	0	0	0	0	0	0	0	1	0
Players who left the club during the season
2	DF	(England) Shay Logan	2+10	0	0	0	0	0	1+1	0	14	0
5	DF	(Scotland) Scott McKenna	4	0	0	0	0	0	2	0	6	0
7	MF	(Scotland) Craig Bryson	1+1	0	0	0	0	0	0	0	2	0
8	MF	(Belgium) Funso Ojo	6+5	0	1	0	0	0	0+1	0	13	0
9	FW	(England) Curtis Main	8+6	2	0+1	0	0	0	1+1	1	17	3
16	FW	(England) Sam Cosgrove	9+5	3	1	0	0	0	0	0	15	3
20	GK	(Czech Republic) Tomáš Černý	0	0	0	0	0	0	0	0	0	0
21	FW	(Scotland) Bruce Anderson	1+5	0	0	0	0	0	0+1	0	7	0
22	DF	(Venezuela) Ronald Hernández	2+2	0	0	0	0	0	0	0	4	0
25	FW	(Scotland) Scott Wright	13+3	2	0	0	0	0	2	0	18	2
32	ST	(England) Ryan Edmondson	3+11	2	0+1	0	0	0	0	0	15	2
34	MF	(Scotland) Kevin Hanratty	0	0	0	0	0	0	0	0	0	0
37	DF	(Malawi) Kieran Ngwenya	0+2	0	0	0	0	0	0	0	2	0
50	FW	(Wales) Marley Watkins	9	2	0	0	0	0	3	0	12	2

=== Goalscorers ===
As of 15 May 2021

Ranking	Nation	Number	Name	Premiership	League Cup	Scottish Cup	Europa League	Total
1	(Scotland)	19	Lewis Ferguson	9	0	0	1	10
2	(Wales)	11	Ryan Hedges	5	0	0	4	9
3	(England)	9	Curtis Main	2	0	0	1	3
3	(Scotland)	9	Callum Hendry	2	0	1	0	3
3	(England)	16	Sam Cosgrove	3	0	0	0	3
3	(Republic of Ireland)	17	Jonny Hayes	2	0	0	1	3
4	(Republic of Ireland)	3	Tommie Hoban	2	0	0	0	2
4	(Northern Ireland)	10	Niall McGinn	0	1	1	0	2
4	(Scotland)	25	Scott Wright	2	0	0	0	2
4	(England)	32	Ryan Edmondson	2	0	0	0	2
4	(Scotland)	40	Ross McCrorie	1	0	0	1	2
4	(Wales)	50	Marley Watkins	2	0	0	0	2
5	(Scotland)	4	Andrew Considine	1	0	0	0	1
5	(Wales)	14	Ash Taylor	1	0	0	0	1
5	(Albania)	22	Florian Kamberi	0	0	1	0	1
5	(Northern Ireland)	33	Matty Kennedy	1	0	0	0	1
			Own goal	1	0	0	0	1
TOTALS				37	1	3	8	49

=== Disciplinary record ===
As of 15 May 2021

Number	Nation	Position	Name	Premiership		League Cup		Scottish Cup		Europa League		Total	
Number	Nation	Position	Name	Booked	Sent off (straight red)	Booked	Sent off (straight red)	Booked	Sent off (straight red)	Booked	Sent off (straight red)	Booked	Sent off (straight red)
2	(England)	DF	Shay Logan	1	0	0	0	0	0	0	0	1	0
3	(Republic of Ireland)	DF	Tommie Hoban	2	0	0	0	1	0	0	0	3	0
4	(Scotland)	DF	Andrew Considine	6	1	1	0	1	0	1	0	9	1
8	(Belgium)	MF	Funso Ojo	2	0	0	0	0	0	0	0	2	0
9	(England)	FW	Curtis Main	1	0	0	0	0	0	0	0	1	0
9	(Scotland)	FW	Callum Hendry	1	0	0	0	0	0	0	0	1	0
10	(Northern Ireland)	FW	Niall McGinn	2	0	0	0	0	0	0	0	2	0
11	(Wales)	MF	Ryan Hedges	1	1	0	0	0	0	0	0	1	1
16	(England)	FW	Sam Cosgrove	1	0	0	0	0	0	0	0	1	0
17	(Republic of Ireland)	MF	Jonny Hayes	3	0	0	0	1	0	0	0	4	0
18	(Scotland)	MF	Connor McLennan	3	0	0	0	0	0	0	0	3	0
19	(Scotland)	MF	Lewis Ferguson	9	1	0	0	2	0	1	0	12	1
24	(Scotland)	MF	Dean Campbell	1	0	0	0	0	0	0	0	1	0
25	(Scotland)	FW	Scott Wright	1	0	0	0	0	0	0	0	1	0
29	(Scotland)	DF	Jack MacKenzie	1	0	0	0	0	0	0	0	1	0
33	(Northern Ireland)	FW	Matty Kennedy	1	0	0	0	0	0	0	0	1	0
40	(Scotland)	MF	Ross McCrorie	6	0	0	0	0	0	0	0	6	0
			TOTALS	42	3	1	0	3	0	2	0	50	3

== Team statistics ==
=== League table ===
Pos	Team	Pld	W	D	L	GF	GA	GD	Pts	Qualification or relegation (Note: Teams play each other three times (33 matches), before the league is split into two groups (the top six and the bottom six).)
2	Celtic	38	22	11	5	78	29	+49	77	Qualification for the Champions League second qualifying round
3	Hibernian	38	18	9	11	48	35	+13	63	Qualification for the Europa Conference League second qualifying round
4	Aberdeen	38	15	11	12	36	38	−2	56	Qualification for the Europa Conference League second qualifying round
5	St Johnstone	38	11	12	15	36	46	−10	45	Qualification for the Europa League third qualifying round (Note: St Johnstone qualified as the 2020–21 Scottish Cup winners.)
6	Livingston	38	12	9	17	42	54	−12	45	

Rules for classification: 1) Points; 2) Goal difference; 3) Goals scored; 4) Head-to-head points; 5) Head-to-Head goal difference; 6) Play-off (only if deciding champion, UEFA competitions qualification, second stage group allocation or relegation).

=== Results by round ===
Round	1	2	3	4	5	6	7	8	9	10	11	12	13	14	15	16	17	18	19	20	21	22	23	24	25	26	27	28	29	30	31	32	33	34	35	36	37	38
Ground	H	A	H	A	H	H	A	H	A	H	H	H	A	A	A	H	A	A	H	H	H	A	H	A	A	H	A	H	A	H	A	H	A	A	H	A	H	A
Result	L	W	W	W	W	L	W	W	D	W	D	W	L	D	D	W	W	D	W	D	L	L	W	D	D	L	L	D	L	W	L	D	L	W	D	W	L	L
Position	11	8	7	4	4	3	4	4	4	4	3	3	3	4	4	3	4	3	3	3	4	3	3	3	4	4	4	4	4	4	4	4	4	4	4	4	4	4

Updated to match(es) played on 15 May 2021. Source:
A = Away; H = Home; W = Win; D = Draw; L = Loss

== Transfers ==
=== Players in ===
Date	Pos	Player	From	Fee
23 June 2020	MF	(Republic of Ireland) Jonny Hayes	(Scotland) Celtic	Free
31 July 2020	DF	(Republic of Ireland) Tommie Hoban	(England) Watford	Free
5 October 2020	DF	(Jamaica) Greg Leigh	(Netherlands) NAC Breda	Free
1 February 2021	MF	(Scotland) Ross McCrorie	(Scotland) Rangers	£350,000 (Note: McCrorie was initially on loan but was made permanent early)

=== Players out ===
Date	Pos	Player	To	Fee
12 June 2020	FW	(Nigeria) David Dangana		Released
20 July 2020	MF	(Scotland) Chris Antoniazzi	(Scotland) Forfar Athletic	Free
28 July 2020	GK	(Republic of Ireland) Danny Rogers	(Scotland) Kilmarnock	Free
20 August 2020	MF	(Scotland) Frank Ross	(Netherlands) Go Ahead Eagles	Free
22 August 2020	DF	(Scotland) Luc Bollan	(Scotland) Brechin City	Free
10 September 2020	MF	(Scotland) Sebastian Ross	(Scotland) Cove Rangers	Free
18 September 2020	MF	(Scotland) Craig Bryson	(Scotland) St Johnstone	Free
23 September 2020	DF	(Scotland) Scott McKenna	(England) Nottingham Forest	£3,000,000
29 September 2020	DF	(Scotland) Lloyd Robertson	(Scotland) Clyde	Free
30 September 2020	DF	(Scotland) Kyle Dalling	(Scotland) Forfar Athletic	Free
17 October 2020	MF	(Scotland) Sean Linden	(Scotland) Rothes	Free
19 November 2020	FW	(Scotland) Kieran Shanks	(Scotland) Inverurie Locos	Free
15 December 2020	GK	(England) Sam Jackson	(England) Braintree Town	Free
8 January 2021	DF	(Scotland) Max Barry	(Scotland) Buckie Thistle	Free
14 January 2021	GK	(Czech Republic) Tomáš Černý	N/A	Retired
31 January 2021	FW	(England) Sam Cosgrove	(England) Birmingham City	£2,000,000
1 February 2021	FW	(England) Curtis Main	(England) Shrewsbury Town	Free
1 February 2021	FW	(Scotland) Scott Wright	(Scotland) Rangers	£175,000 (Note: Wright had initially signed a pre-contract)

=== Loans in ===
Date	Pos	Player	From	Fee
31 July 2020	FW	(England) Ryan Edmondson	(England) Leeds United	January Loan
22 August 2020	FW	(Wales) Marley Watkins	(England) Bristol City	January Loan
5 October 2020	GK	(England) Gary Woods	(England) Oldham Athletic	Season Loan (Note: Was initially on loan until January but was extended)
1 February 2021	FW	(Scotland) Fraser Hornby	(France) Reims	End of Season Loan
1 February 2021	FW	(Scotland) Callum Hendry	(Scotland) St Johnstone	End of Season Loan
1 February 2021	FW	(Albania) Flo Kamberi	(Switzerland) St Gallen	End of Season Loan

=== Loans out ===
Date	Pos	Player	From	Fee
4 September 2020	MF	(Finland) Miko Virtanen	(Scotland) Arbroath	January Loan
5 September 2020	FW	(Scotland) Michael Ruth	(Scotland) Arbroath	January Loan
18 September 2020	DF	(Republic of Ireland) Connor Power	(Scotland) Turriff United	January Loan
18 September 2020	DF	(Republic of Ireland) Luke Turner	(Scotland) Turriff United	January Loan
18 September 2020	MF	(Scotland) Tyler Mykyta	(Scotland) Turriff United	Season Loan
25 September 2020	MF	(Scotland) Connor Barron	(Scotland) Brechin City	Season Loan
2 October 2020	MF	(Scotland) Ethan Ross	(Scotland) Raith Rovers	January Loan
4 October 2020	DF	(Scotland) Jack Mackenzie	(Scotland) Forfar Athletic	January Loan
5 October 2020	FW	(Scotland) Bruce Anderson	(Scotland) Ayr United	January Loan
28 January 2021	MF	(Belgium) Funso Ojo	(England) Wigan Athletic	End of Season Loan
1 February 2021	FW	(Scotland) Bruce Anderson	(Scotland) Hamilton Academical	End of Season Loan
18 February 2021	DF	(Venezuela) Ronald Hernández	(United States) Atlanta United	MLS Season Loan
25 March 2021	DF	(Scotland) Kieran Ngwenya	(Scotland) Cove Rangers	End of Season Loan
25 March 2021	MF	(Scotland) Kevin Hanratty	(Scotland) Cove Rangers	End of Season Loan
29 March 2021	DF	(England) Shay Logan	(Scotland) Heart of Midlothian	End of Season Loan

== See also ==
- List of Aberdeen F.C. seasons
