= Michael McKenna (Scottish footballer) =

Scottish footballer

Personal information
- Date of birth: 4 January 1991 (age 35)
- Place of birth: Edinburgh, Scotland
- Position: Midfielder

Team information
- Current team: Arbroath
- Number: 14

Youth career
- Hibernian

Senior career*
Years	Team	Apps	(Gls)
2012–2014	Musselburgh Athletic		
2014–2015	Livingston	25	(1)
2015–2018	Berwick Rangers	80	(13)
2018–2024	Arbroath	188	(39)
2024–2025	Falkirk	17	(0)
2025–2026	East Fife	45	(4)
2026–	Arbroath	11	(1)
- * Club domestic league appearances and goals as of 17 October 2026

Michael McKenna (born 4 January 1991) is a Scottish footballer who plays as a midfielder for Scottish Championship club Arbroath.

== Career ==
Born in Edinburgh, McKenna spent time in Hibernian's youth academy before joining Musselburgh Athletic in 2012. In the summer of 2014, McKenna signed for Scottish Championship side Livingston on a one-year contract. In summer 2015, McKenna joined Berwick Rangers. Having already signed a pre-contract agreement with the club, McKenna signed for Arbroath for an undisclosed fee in January 2018.

On the expiration of his contract with Arbroath in May 2024, McKenna signed a one-year contract with Falkirk.

He left Falkirk in January 2025 and joined East Fife on a two-and-a-half year deal, reuniting him with former boss Dick Campbell.

On 13 June 2026, McKenna rejoined former club Arbroath on a one-year deal.

== Career statistics ==
As of match played 4 May 2024

Appearances and goals by club, season and competition
Club	Season	League			Scottish Cup		League Cup		Other		Total	
Club	Season	Division	Apps	Goals	Apps	Goals	Apps	Goals	Apps	Goals	Apps	Goals
Livingston	2014–15	Scottish Championship	25	1	1	0	3	0	4 (Note: Appearance(s) in Scottish Challenge Cup)	0	33	1
Berwick Rangers	2015–16	Scottish League Two	34	3	1	0	2	0	1	0	38	3
Berwick Rangers	2016–17	Scottish League Two	27	4	1	1	4	0	1	0	33	5
Berwick Rangers	2017–18	Scottish League Two	19	6	2	0	2	0	2	1	25	7
Berwick Rangers	Total		80	13	4	1	8	0	4	0	96	15
Arbroath	2017–18	Scottish League One	14	4	0	0	0	0	2 (Note: Appearance(s) in Scottish League One play-offs)	0	16	4
Arbroath	2018–19	Scottish League One	34	6	1	0	4	3	3	2	42	11
Arbroath	2019–20	Scottish Championship	22	3	4	2	4	1	2	0	32	6
Arbroath	2020–21	Scottish Championship	26	2	1	0	5	0	0	0	32	2
Arbroath	2021–22	Scottish Championship	34	15	3	0	5	0	3 (Note: One appearance in Scottish Challenge Cup, two appearances in Scottish Premiership play-offs)	0	45	15
Arbroath	2022–23	Scottish Championship	33	5	2	0	5	1	2	1	42	7
Arbroath	2023–24	Scottish Championship	25	4	1	0	3	1	3	1	32	6
Arbroath	Total		188	39	12	2	26	6	15	4	241	51
Falkirk	2024–2025	Scottish Championship	17	0	2	0	5	0	2 (Note: Appearance(s) in Stirlingshire Cup)	0	26	0
Career total			310	53	19	3	42	6	25	5	396	67

== Honours ==
Arbroath

- Scottish League One: 2018–19

Individual

- Scottish Championship Top Scorer: 2021–22
- PFA Scotland Players' Player of the Year: 2021–22 Scottish Championship
