= Tommie Hoban =

Footballer (born 1994)

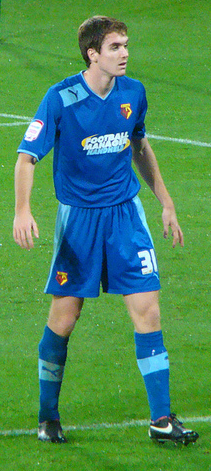
- Hoban playing for Watford in 2012

Personal information
- Full name: Thomas Michael Hoban
- Date of birth: 24 January 1994 (age 32)
- Place of birth: Walthamstow, England
- Height: 1.88 m (6 ft 2 in)
- Position: Defender

Youth career
- 2002–2009: Arsenal
- 2009–2011: Watford

Senior career*
Years	Team	Apps	(Gls)
2011–2019	Watford	54	(2)
2012	→ Wealdstone (loan)	7	(0)
2016–2017	→ Blackburn Rovers (loan)	16	(1)
2018–2019	→ Aberdeen (loan)	5	(1)
2020–2021	Aberdeen	37	(2)
2021	Crewe Alexandra	0	(0)
2023–2024	Hornchurch	21	(3)

International career
2010–2011	Republic of Ireland U17	6	(0)
2012	Republic of Ireland U19	1	(1)
2014–2016	Republic of Ireland U21	11	(1)
- * Club domestic league appearances and goals

Thomas Michael Hoban (born 24 January 1994) is a former professional footballer who played as a defender.

Hoban played for Arsenal, Watford, Wealdstone, Blackburn Rovers, Aberdeen, Crewe Alexandra, and Hornchurch. Born in England, Hoban represented the Republic of Ireland at youth international level.

Hoban played anywhere in defence but preferred to play centrally.

== Early and personal life ==
Born in Walthamstow, London, Hoban grew up in the Chingford and Woodford Green area. He attended Loyola Preparatory School in Buckhurst Hill. He was also a boyhood Chelsea supporter.

His mother and paternal grandparents are Irish, and he said in an interview that he considered himself an Ireland player. Hoban's son was born in February 2019.

== Club career ==
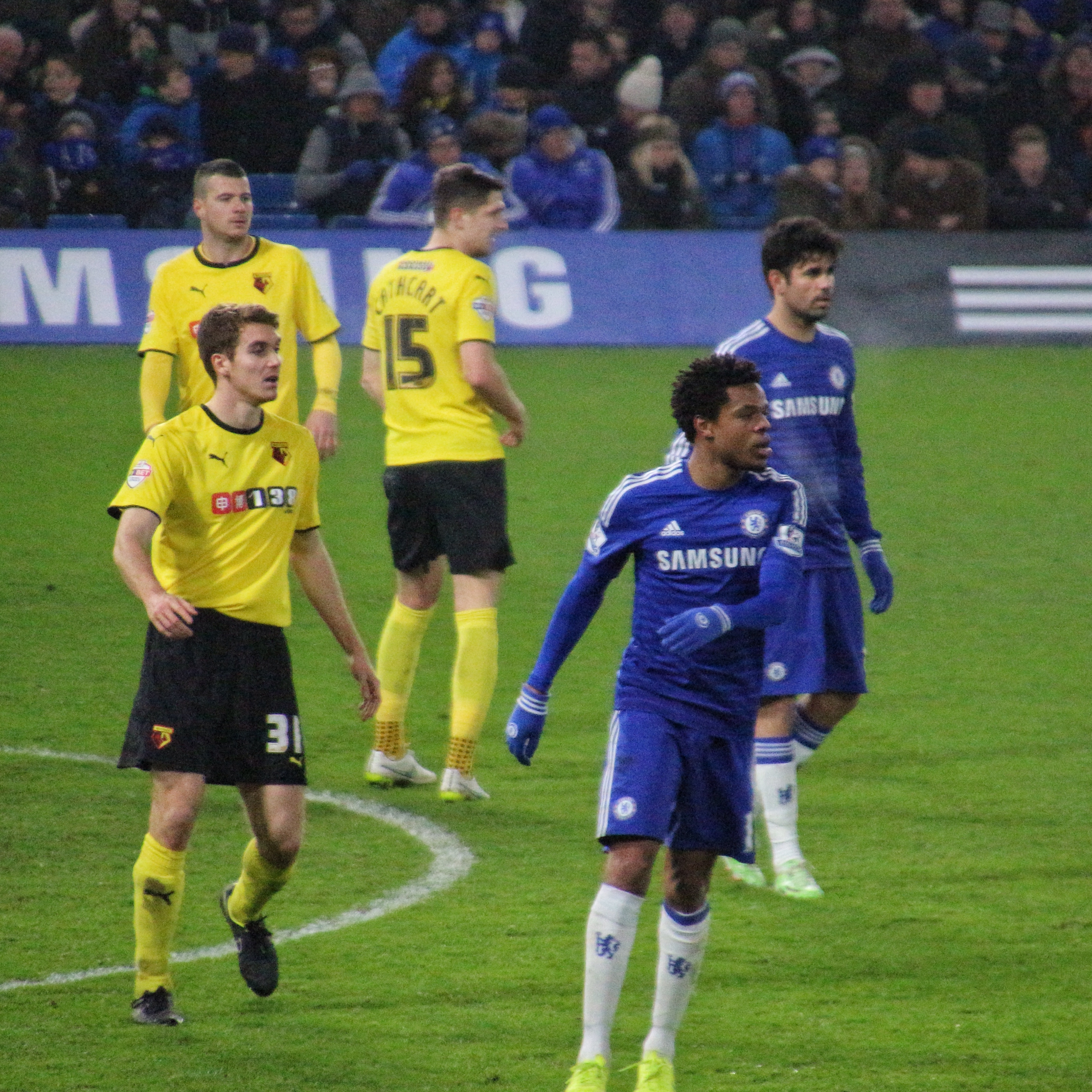
Hoban is preparing to mark Loïc Rémy during Watford's FA Cup match against Chelsea in January 2015.

Hoban joined Arsenal's youth system at the age of 7 and was released at 14. Following his release eight clubs expressed an interest in Hoban, and from them, he and his family selected Watford based on location and the recommendation of an Arsenal coach.

=== Watford ===
Hoban made his senior debut for Watford on 7 May 2011, in their final game of the 2010–11 season against Preston North End coming on for Martin Taylor in the first half, as they lost 3–1. After making his debut, he was praised by Manager Malky Mackay for his performance throughout the match. He turned professional three days later. After being linked a move away from Watford, Hoban signed a new contract extension with the club.

Hoban moved on loan to Wealdstone on 2 February 2012 until the end of the season. He made his Wealdstone debut on 14 February 2012, starting the whole game, in a 2–2 draw against Dartford in the FA Trophy campaign. Hoban went on to make seven league appearances during his time at the club.

In the 2012–13 season, Hoban, once again, signed a new contract with the club, keeping him until 2017. On 29 September 2012 he made his first team return, starting the whole game, in a 3–2 win over Huddersfield Town. In a follow–up match, Hoban scored his first Watford goal on 2 October 2012, in a 2–1 win over Charlton Athletic. Then, on 23 October 2012, he scored his second goal for the side, in a 2–1 loss against Cardiff City. Since then, he received a handful of first team appearances for the side. Following "rave reviews" in the Championship during the 2012–13 season, Hoban received attention from a number of Premiership clubs. However, he suffered an Achilles tendon injury at the beginning of January. On 8 February 2013, Hoban returned to the starting line-up, in a 2–2 draw against Crystal Palace. However, his return was short–lived when he picked up an ankle injury. At the end of the 2012–13 season, Hoban went on to make nineteen appearances and scoring two times in all competitions. In early May 2013, he picked up the Hornets' Young Player of the Season award.

Hoban missed most of the 2013–14 season following a surgery on his ankle injury. On 15 February 2014 he made his return from injury as a second half–substitute, in a 1–0 win over Middlesbrough. Since returning to the first team from injury, Hoban found himself behind the pecking order in the central–defence. By April, Hoban soon received a handful of first team football towards of the 2013–14 season. He went on to make seven appearances at the end of the 2013–14 season.

The 2014–15 season saw Hoban make his first appearance of the season, keeping a clean sheet, in a 1–0 win over Stevenage in the first round of the League Cup. Seven days later, on 19 August 2014, he set up a goal for Gianni Munari, in a 2–0 win over Rotherham United. Following his return, Hoban found himself in a competition in the centre–back positions. But he soon played in left–back position instead. However, by end of 2014, Hoban lost his first team place, leading Brentford to take interest in signing him. By late–December, he soon regained his first team place, where he played in the centre–back position. However, on 7 March 2015, Hoban was sent–off for a second bookable offence, in a 2–2 draw against Wolverhampton Wanderers. After returning from suspension, he rotated in playing in the centre–back and left–back positions for the rest of the season. During the course of the 2014–15 Championship season, Hoban helped Watford earn promotion to the Premier League. At the end of the 2014–15 season, Hoban went on to make thirty appearances in all competitions. Once again, he picked up the Hornets' Young Player of the Season award.

At the start of the 2015–16 season, Hoban signed a four–year contract, keeping him until 2019. However, he soon lost his first team place under the new management of Quique Sánchez Flores and was demoted to the reserve side. This also combined with his own injuries concern. On 4 April 2016 he made his return from injury in a reserve match, as Watford U21 lost to Coventry City U21. Despite returning from injury, Hoban never made no appearances towards the end of the 2015–16 season.

==== Blackburn Rovers (loan) ====
Hoban signed on a season-long loan for Blackburn Rovers on 26 August 2016. He made his Blackburn Rovers debut, starting the whole game, in a 1–0 loss against Fulham on 27 August 2016. After the match, Manager Owen Coyle and local newspaper The Lancashire Telegraph praised Hoban's performances on his debut. He quickly became a first team regular for the side, playing in the centre–back positions. This lasted until Hoban suffered a shoulder injury that kept him out for four months. On 11 March 2017 Hoban returned to the first team from injury, starting the whole game, in a 2–2 draw against Norwich City. Following his return from injury, he found himself in the substitute bench role. Despite this, Hoban scored his first goal for Blackburn in a 1–0 win over Nottingham Forest on 14 April 2017. Despite an improvement in form that offered some hope of survival, Blackburn were relegated to League One at the end of the 2016–17 season. At the end of the 2016–17 season, where he made seventeen appearances and scoring once in all competitions for the side, Hoban returned to his parent club.

Hoban suffered an anterior cruciate ligament injury at the start of the 2017–18 season. In the 2018–19 pre–season, he made an appearance for the side, in a friendly match against 1. FC Köln.

==== Aberdeen (loan) ====
Hoban moved on loan to Scottish Premiership side Aberdeen in July 2018. He played in both legs of a Europa League tie against Burnley, as Aberdeen lost 4–2 on aggregate. Hoban scored on his league debut for the club on 25 August 2018, in a 1–1 draw against Hibernian. However, his time with Aberdeen was also severely affected by injury, and in February 2019 he suffered the second anterior cruciate ligament injury of his career. As a result, Hoban terminated his loan spell with Aberdeen and returned to his parent club.

=== Aberdeen ===
Hoban was released by Watford at the end of the 2018–19 season, and returned to Aberdeen to continue his rehabilitation.

On 31 July 2020, he signed a short-term contract with Aberdeen, until January 2021. In October, he extended the deal until the end of the season.

=== Crewe Alexandra ===
On 1 July 2021, he signed for League One club Crewe Alexandra, but on 16 August 2021 Crewe confirmed that Hoban had retired from professional football, without playing a game for the club.

=== Hornchurch ===
On 12 July 2023, Hoban returned to football when he signed for Isthmian League Premier Division club Hornchurch. He departed the club in August 2024.

== International career ==
Hoban was born in England but qualifies to play for the Republic of Ireland through his Dublin-born mother. His paternal grandparents are also Irish.

Hoban made his Republic of Ireland U17 debut on 25 September 2010, where he started the whole game, in a 2–0 win over Albania U17. Hoban represented Ireland at under-17 level, where he went on to make six appearances for the side.

In September 2011, Hoban was called up to the Republic of Ireland U19 for the first time. He made his Republic of Ireland U19 debut on 10 October 2011, starting the whole game, in a 3–1 win over Russia U19. On 10 October 2012 Hoban scored his first Republic of Ireland U19 goal, in a 5–2 win over Luxembourg U19. In a follow–up match, he captained the under-19s for the first time, in a 1–0 win over Macedonia U19. Hoban went on to make six appearances and scoring once for the Republic of Ireland U19 side.

In February 2014, Hoban was called up to the Republic of Ireland U21 squad for the first time. On 5 September 2014 he made his debut for Republic of Ireland U21, starting as captain, in a 2–0 win over Germany U21. Throughout his time at the Republic of Ireland U21 side, Hoban captained the side in the number of matches. Then, on 8 September 2015, he scored his first Republic of Ireland U21 goal, in a 2–0 win over Andorra U21. Hoban went on to make ten appearances and scoring once for the Republic of Ireland U21 side.

== Career statistics ==
Appearances and goals by club, season and competition
Club	Season	League			National cup		League cup		Other		Total	
Club	Season	Division	Apps	Goals	Apps	Goals	Apps	Goals	Apps	Goals	Apps	Goals
Watford	2010–11	Championship	1	0	0	0	0	0	0	0	1	0
Watford	2011–12	Championship	0	0	0	0	0	0	0	0	0	0
Watford	2012–13	Championship	19	2	0	0	0	0	0	0	19	2
Watford	2013–14	Championship	7	0	0	0	0	0	0	0	7	0
Watford	2014–15	Championship	27	0	1	0	2	0	0	0	30	0
Watford	2015–16	Premier League	0	0	0	0	0	0	0	0	0	0
Watford	2016–17	Premier League	0	0	0	0	1	0	0	0	1	0
Watford	2017–18	Premier League	0	0	0	0	0	0	0	0	0	0
Watford	2018–19	Premier League	0	0	0	0	0	0	0	0	0	0
Watford	Total		54	2	1	0	3	0	0	0	58	2
Blackburn Rovers (loan)	2016–17	Championship	16	1	0	0	0	0	0	0	16	1
Aberdeen (loan)	2018–19	Scottish Premiership	5	1	2	0	0	0	2	0	9	1
Aberdeen	2020–21	Scottish Premiership	37	2	4	0	1	0	2	0	44	2
Crewe Alexandra	2021–22	League One	0	0	0	0	0	0	0	0	0	0
Career total			112	6	7	0	4	0	4	0	127	6
