= Jason Thomson =

Scottish footballer (born 1987)

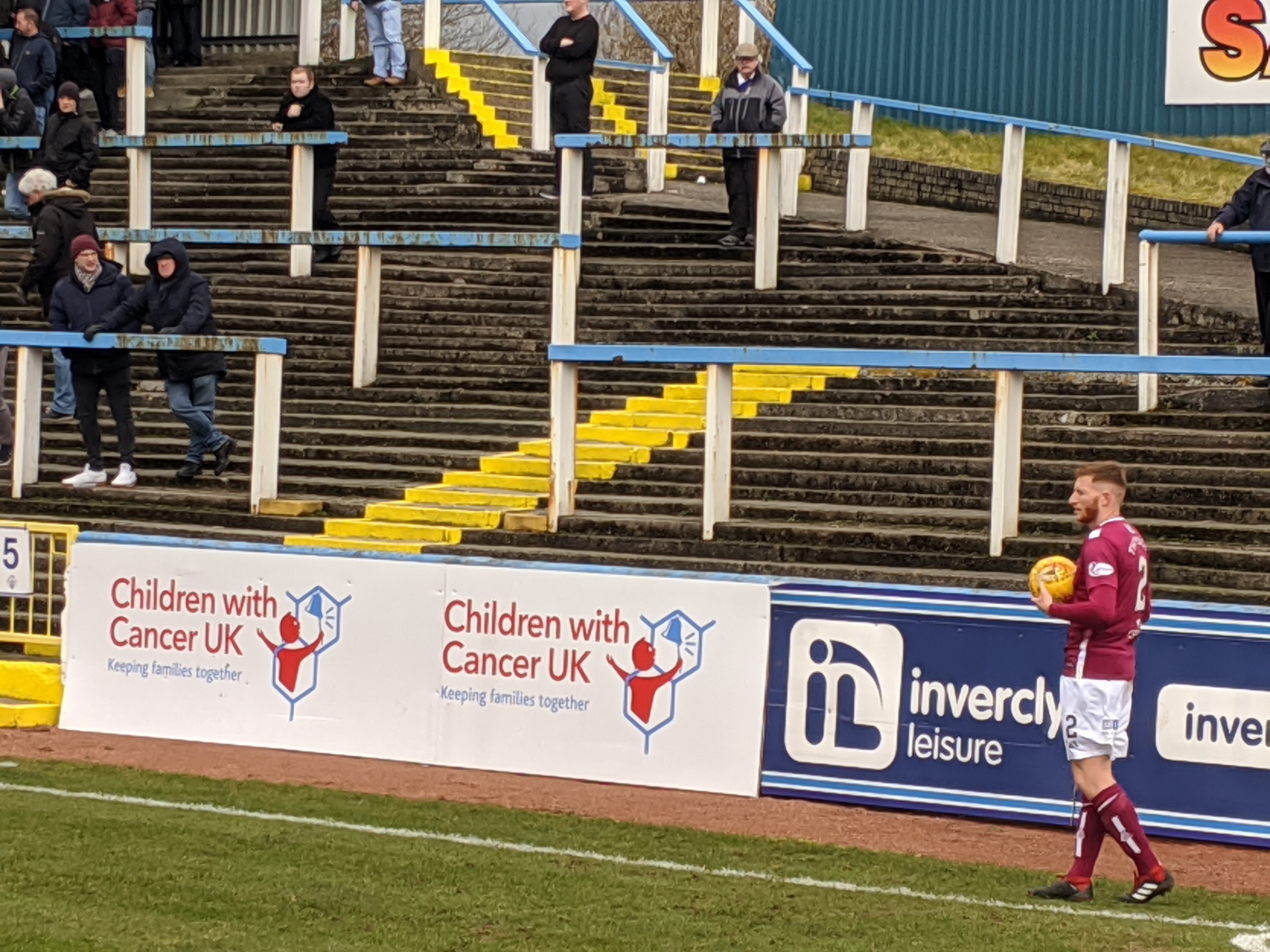
- Thomson about to take a throw-in during his time at Arbroath in 2020.

Personal information
- Date of birth: 26 July 1987 (age 39)
- Place of birth: Edinburgh, Scotland
- Height: 1.83 m (6 ft 0 in)
- Position: Right-back

Team information
- Current team: Arbroath
- Number: 26

Youth career
- Loanhead Boys Club
- 2003–2005: Heart of Midlothian

Senior career*
Years	Team	Apps	(Gls)
2004–2012	Heart of Midlothian	42	(0)
2006–2007	→ Livingston (loan)	18	(0)
2011	→ Dunfermline Athletic (loan)	12	(1)
2012	→ Raith Rovers (loan)	11	(0)
2012–2018	Raith Rovers	189	(10)
2018–2022	Arbroath	100	(4)
2022–2024	Kelty Hearts	44	(0)
2025–	Arbroath	0	(0)
- * Club domestic league appearances and goals

Jason Thomson (born 26 July 1987) is a Scottish professional footballer who plays as a right-back for Arbroath. He previously played for Heart of Midlothian, Livingston, Dunfermline, Raith Rovers and Kelty Hearts.

== Career ==
=== Youth career ===
A Hearts supporter Edinburgh-born Thomson began his career playing for Loanhead Boys Club before joining Hearts Youth Academy, signing a professional contract with the club in July 2003. He was selected for the Lothian Schools XI in 2002 while a pupil at Beeslack High School (Penicuik), along with other Hearts youngsters John Armstrong, David Gray and Andrew Driver.

=== Hearts ===
Thomson earned an unexpectedly early debut in March 2005, when a flu epidemic at Tynecastle forced Hearts' head coach John Robertson into naming a plethora of youngsters in his first team squad against Inverness Caledonian Thistle. Thomson started and impressed against the Highland side, and was rewarded with two further first team appearances that season.

It was a different story in 2005–06 however, as a wave of new signings and Hearts' impressive form ensured Thomson spent the entire season playing reserve and under-19 football. In search of further playing time, Thomson was reunited with John Robertson, by then Livingston manager, for the 2006–07 season.

Under Stephen Frail towards the end of the 2007–08 season Thomson played the final five games of the season. This meant upon Csaba László's arrival he was a part of the first team squad. He went on to start the season at right back in Robbie Neilson's absence and played a squad part for much of the season covering when either Neilson or Lee Wallace were out. He signed a new three-year deal in April 2009. Thomson returned to the first team with a start against local rivals Hibs on 7 November 2009, replacing Craig Thomson in the starting line up and was voted the match sponsors man of the match in a very impressive display.

First team appearances remained limited during season 2010–11 and at the start of the 2011–12 season he was loaned out to Dunfermline. During this time he was advised that he would be free to find a new club in January or at the end of the season. On his return he failed to make a further appearance and in March was sent on loan again to Raith Rovers.

=== Livingston (loan) ===
In July 2006, Thomson joined Livingston on a season-long loan. He made his debut on 5 August, in a 2–0 win over Queen of the South. In all he made 21 appearances in all competitions.

=== Dunfermline (loan) ===
On 7 July 2011, Thomson Joined Dunfermline on a six-month loan deal. He made his debut on the opening day of the season against St Mirren at East End Park and scored his first goal for the club against Kilmarnock on 10 September. He had played every game for the club until Dunfermline played parent club Hearts and he was unable to play due to a gentlemans agreement. Thomson admitted he would be happy to make his loan deal permanent as he was delighted to be playing regular first team football. At the start of November Thomson suffered a groin injury. It had been suspected he had played his last game for the club with his loan deal expiring at the start of January, however he returned from injury in Dunfermline's game against St Johnstone on Christmas Eve. Despite wanting to stay, on 29 December Dunfermline revealed they had not extended his loan spell and he returned to Hearts.

=== Raith Rovers ===
On 2 March 2012, Thomson joined Scottish First Division side Raith Rovers on loan until the end of the season. He made his debut the following day, playing the full match in a 5–0 win over Greenock Morton. Thomson moved to Raith on a permanent basis at the end of the season.

On 6 April 2014, Thomson captained Raith Rovers as they defeated Rangers 1–0 at Easter Road to win the Scottish Challenge Cup. At the end of the 2017–18 season he left Raith Rovers.

=== Arbroath ===
In May 2018, Thomson signed for Scottish League One club Arbroath. In his first season at Arbroath, the club won the League One title, and ahead of the new season in the Scottish Championship, Thomson signed a new contract until the end of the 2020–21 season.

=== Kelty Hearts ===
Thomson signed for Kelty Hearts in September 2022 and extended his contract with the club at the end of the season.

On 12 May 2024, Thomson announced his retirement, bringing an end to his playing career.

=== Arbroath (second spell) ===
On 14 February 2025, Thomson came out of retirement, penning a short-term deal with former club Arbroath until the end of the season.

== Career statistics ==
As of match played 27 April 2024

Appearances and goals by club, season and competition
Club	Season	League			Scottish Cup		League Cup		Other		Total	
Club	Season	Division	Apps	Goals	Apps	Goals	Apps	Goals	Apps	Goals	Apps	Goals
Hearts	2004–05	Scottish Premier League	4	0	0	0	0	0	0	0	4	0
Hearts	2005–06	Scottish Premier League	0	0	0	0	0	0	0	0	0	0
Hearts	2006–07	Scottish Premier League	0	0	0	0	0	0	0	0	0	0
Hearts	2007–08	Scottish Premier League	5	0	0	0	0	0	0	0	5	0
Hearts	2008–09	Scottish Premier League	11	0	0	0	0	0	0	0	11	0
Hearts	2009–10	Scottish Premier League	16	0	0	0	1	0	0	0	17	0
Hearts	2010–11	Scottish Premier League	6	0	0	0	0	0	0	0	6	0
Hearts	2011–12	Scottish Premier League	0	0	0	0	0	0	0	0	0	0
Hearts	Total		42	0	0	0	1	0	0	0	43	0
Livingston (loan)	2006–07	Scottish First Division	18	0	0	0	2	0	1 (Note: Appearances in the Scottish Challenge Cup)	0	21	0
Dunfermline Athletic (loan)	2011–12	Scottish Premier League	12	1	0	0	2	0	0	0	14	1
Raith Rovers (loan)	2011–12	Scottish First Division	11	0	0	0	0	0	0	0	11	0
Raith Rovers	2012–13	Scottish First Division	35	0	4	0	3	0	3	0	45	0
Raith Rovers	2013–14	Scottish Championship	33	2	4	0	2	0	5	0	44	2
Raith Rovers	2014–15	Scottish Championship	36	0	4	0	2	0	1	0	43	0
Raith Rovers	2015–16	Scottish Championship	26	1	0	0	3	0	4 (Note: Two appearances in the Scottish Challenge Cup and two in the Premiership play-offs)	0	33	1
Raith Rovers	2016–17	Scottish Championship	23	0	1	0	4	0	2 (Note: Appearances in the Championship play-offs)	0	30	0
Raith Rovers	2017–18	Scottish League One	36	7	1	0	4	0	6 (Note: Four Appearances in the Scottish Challenge Cup and two in the Championship play-offs)	0	47	7
Raith Rovers	Total		189	10	14	0	18	0	21	0	242	10
Arbroath	2018–19	Scottish League One	32	2	1	0	4	0	2	0	39	2
Arbroath	2019–20	Scottish Championship	18	1	2	0	4	1	1	0	25	2
Arbroath	2020–21	Scottish Championship	25	0	0	0	5	1	0	0	30	1
Arbroath	2021–22	Scottish Championship	21	1	3	1	0	0	3 (Note: One appearance in the Scottish Challenge Cup and two in the League One play-offs.)	0	27	2
Arbroath	2022–23	Scottish Championship	4	0	-		5	1	0	0	9	1
Arbroath	Total		100	4	6	1	18	3	6	0	130	8
Kelty Hearts	2022–23	Scottish League One	16	0	0	0	-		1	0	17	0
Kelty Hearts	2023–24	Scottish League One	28	0	2	0	4	0	2	0	36	0
Kelty Hearts	Total		44	0	2	0	4	0	3	0	53	0
Career total			416	15	22	1	45	3	31	0	514	19
