= Miko Virtanen =

Finnish football player (born 1999)

Personal information
- Full name: Miko Aarne Virtanen
- Date of birth: 29 January 1999 (age 27)
- Place of birth: Tampere, Finland
- Height: 1.88 m (6 ft 2 in)
- Position: Defensive midfielder

Team information
- Current team: Elgin City
- Number: 4

Youth career
- 2007–2011: TPV
- 2011–2017: Everton
- 2017–2019: Aberdeen

Senior career*
| Years | Team | Apps | (Gls) |
| 2019–2021 | Aberdeen | 2 | (0) |
| 2019–2020 | → Arbroath (loan) | 21 | (0) |
| 2020–2021 | → Arbroath (loan) | 9 | (0) |
| 2021–2023 | Hamilton Academical | 20 | (0) |
| 2023 | Cove Rangers | 11 | (0) |
| 2023–2025 | Alloa Athletic | 46 | (1) |
| 2025– | Elgin City | 35 | (1) |

International career
| 2017–2018 | Finland U19 | 6 | (0) |
| 2019–2020 | Finland U21 | 6 | (0) |
- * Club domestic league appearances and goals as of 3 May 2026

Miko Aarne Virtanen (born 29 January 1999) is a Finnish professional footballer who plays as a midfielder for Elgin City. He has previously played for Aberdeen, Arbroath, Hamilton Academical, Cove Rangers and Alloa Athletic.

== Club career ==
=== Youth career ===
Virtanen started playing football in Tampere, Finland for local team TPV. He and his family moved to England when he was 13 years old after impressing Everton during an international youth tournament.

=== Aberdeen ===
On 2 November 2017, it was announced that Virtanen had joined Aberdeen until the end of the season after a successful trial with the club. He said upon signing that he hoped joining Aberdeen would help him secure his place in the Finland squad at the following year's Euro Under-19 finals.

==== Arbroath loans ====
On 29 August 2019, Virtanen moved to Arbroath on a season long loan. He made his debut on 28 September 2019, in a 2–1 away defeat against Dundee United in the Scottish Championship. He was again loaned to Arbroath in September 2020, until recalled by Aberdeen in January.

=== Hamilton Academical ===
In August 2021 he signed for Hamilton Academical. After making 24 appearances and scoring 1 goal over two seasons, Virtanen left Accies by mutual consent on 9 January 2023.

=== Cove Rangers ===
Following his release from Hamilton, Virtanen returned to the north-east of Scotland to sign for Scottish Championship side Cove Rangers on a deal until the end of the season. Virtanen was released in May 2023 with Cove Rangers relegated from the Scottish Championship.

=== Alloa Athletic ===
On 20 January 2023, Virtanen was announced at Alloa Athletic.

=== Elgin City ===
On 31 May 2025, Virtanen signed for Scottish League Two side Elgin City on a one-year deal with an option to extend the contract.

== Career statistics ==
=== Club ===
As of 26 April 2025

Appearances and goals by club, season and competition
| Club | Season | League | | | Cup | | League Cup | | Other | | Total | |
| Club | Season | Division | Apps | Goals | Apps | Goals | Apps | Goals | Apps | Goals | Apps | Goals |
|---|---|---|---|---|---|---|---|---|---|---|---|---|
| Aberdeen U21 | 2018–19 | | — | | | | | | 1 (Note: Appearance(s) in the Scottish Challenge Cup) | 0 | 1 | 0 |
| Aberdeen U21 | 2019–20 | | — | | | | | | 1 | 0 | 1 | 0 |
| Aberdeen U21 | Total | | 0 | 0 | 0 | 0 | 0 | 0 | 2 | 0 | 2 | 0 |
| Aberdeen | 2018–19 | Scottish Premiership | 0 | 0 | 0 | 0 | 0 | 0 | 0 | 0 | 0 | 0 |
| Aberdeen | 2019–20 | Scottish Premiership | 0 | 0 | 0 | 0 | 0 | 0 | 0 | 0 | 0 | 0 |
| Aberdeen | 2020–21 | Scottish Premiership | 2 | 0 | 0 | 0 | 0 | 0 | 0 | 0 | 2 | 0 |
| Aberdeen | Total | | 2 | 0 | 0 | 0 | 0 | 0 | 0 | 0 | 2 | 0 |
| Arbroath (loan) | 2019–20 | Scottish Championship | 21 | 0 | 3 | 0 | 0 | 0 | 0 | 0 | 24 | 0 |
| Arbroath (loan) | 2020–21 | Scottish Championship | 9 | 0 | 0 | 0 | 3 | 0 | 0 | 0 | 12 | 0 |
| Arbroath (loan) | Total | | 30 | 0 | 3 | 0 | 3 | 0 | 0 | 0 | 36 | 0 |
| Hamilton Academical | 2021–22 | Scottish Championship | 15 | 0 | 1 | 0 | 0 | 0 | 3 | 1 | 19 | 1 |
| Hamilton Academical | 2022–23 | Scottish Championship | 5 | 0 | 0 | 0 | 0 | 0 | 0 | 0 | 5 | 0 |
| Hamilton Academical | Total | | 20 | 0 | 1 | 0 | 0 | 0 | 3 | 1 | 24 | 1 |
| Cove Rangers | 2022–23 | Scottish Championship | 11 | 0 | 0 | 0 | 0 | 0 | 0 | 0 | 11 | 0 |
| Alloa Athletic | 2023–24 | Scottish League One | 24 | 1 | 2 | 0 | 4 | 0 | 1 | 0 | 31 | 1 |
| Alloa Athletic | 2024–25 | Scottish League One | 22 | 0 | 0 | 0 | 0 | 0 | 3 | 0 | 25 | 0 |
| Alloa Athletic | Total | | 46 | 1 | 2 | 0 | 4 | 0 | 4 | 0 | 56 | 1 |
| Career total | | | 110 | 1 | 6 | 0 | 7 | 0 | 8 | 1 | 131 | 2 |
