= Mark Whatley =

Scottish footballer

Personal information
- Date of birth: 11 July 1990 (age 36)
- Position: Midfielder

Team information
- Current team: Forfar Athletic
- Number: 10

Senior career*
Years	Team	Apps	(Gls)
- Raith Rovers
2009–2010	→ Tayport (loan)		
2013–2014	Spartans		
2014–2021	Arbroath	198	(6)
2021–2023	Montrose	51	(0)
2023–	Forfar Athletic	60	(4)
- * Club domestic league appearances and goals as of 4 May 2026

Mark Whatley (born 11 July 1990) is a Scottish professional footballer who plays as a midfielder for Scottish League Two club Forfar Athletic. Whatley has previously played for Raith Rovers, Tayport, Spartans, Arbroath and Montrose.

== Career ==
On 20 November 2009, Whatley moved on loan to Tayport from Raith Rovers.

In July 2014, Whatley joined Arbroath and made his debut on 26 July against Alloa Athletic in a 4–1 home loss in the Scottish League Challenge Cup. During his debut season, Whatley made 45 appearances and scored 1 goal. In February 2015, Whatley had a trial spell with Aberdeen. In the 2016–17 season, Whatley helped Arbroath get promoted to the Scottish League One and was announced captain.

Whatley left Arbroath and signed for Montrose in May 2021.

== Statistics ==
Appearances and goals by club, season and competition
Club	Season	League			Scottish Cup		League Cup		Other		Total	
Club	Season	Division	Apps	Goals	Apps	Goals	Apps	Goals	Apps	Goals	Apps	Goals
Spartans	2013–14	Lowland Football League	0	0	1	0	0	0	0	0	1	0
Arbroath	2014–15	Scottish League Two	36	1	5	0	1	0	3	0	45	1
Arbroath	2015–16	Scottish League Two	34	2	3	1	0	0	0	0	37	3
Arbroath	2016–17	Scottish League Two	35	2	2	0	4	0	2	0	43	2
Arbroath	2017–18	Scottish League One	34	1	2	0	4	0	2	0	42	1
Arbroath	2018–19	Scottish League One	29	0	1	0	4	0	2	0	36	0
Arbroath	2019–20	Scottish Championship	8	0	0	0	3	0	2	0	13	0
Arbroath	2020–21	Scottish Championship	5	0	0	0	1	0	0	0	6	0
Arbroath	Arbroath Total		181	6	13	1	16	0	11	0	216	7
Montrose	2021–22	Scottish League One	19	0	2	0	4	0	2	0	27	0
Total			200	6	16	1	20	0	13	0	244	7
