= Luke Donnelly =

Scottish footballer (born 1996)

Personal information
- Date of birth: 20 January 1996 (age 30)
- Place of birth: Glasgow, Scotland
- Position: Striker

Team information
- Current team: Alloa Athletic
- Number: 9

Youth career
- 2004–2014: Celtic

Senior career*
Years	Team	Apps	(Gls)
2014–2017	Celtic	0	(0)
2014–2015	→ East Stirlingshire (loan)	17	(1)
2016	→ Alloa Athletic (loan)	6	(1)
2017	→ Greenock Morton (loan)	6	(0)
2017–2018	Queen's Park	26	(8)
2018–2019	Stranraer	18	(4)
2019–2022	Arbroath	76	(6)
2022–	Alloa Athletic	93	(24)
- * Club domestic league appearances and goals as of 4 April 2026

Luke Donnelly (born 20 January 1996) is a Scottish footballer who plays as a striker for Alloa Athletic. Donnelly began his career as a youth player for Celtic and has since played for East Stirlingshire, Morton, Queen's Park, Stranraer, Arbroath and is in his second spell with Alloa.

== Club career ==
Born in Glasgow, Donnelly started his career with Celtic playing regularly for their development side.

Donnelly moved on a two-month loan to East Stirlingshire in November 2014, which was later extended until the end of the season.

On 21 May 2015, he scored Celtic's third goal in a 5–2 victory against Rangers as they won the 2014–15 Scottish Youth Cup.

On 26 August 2016, Donnelly joined Alloa Athletic on loan. He made his debut the following day as a substitute and scored in a 4–0 victory against Albion Rovers. Donnelly then joined Greenock Morton on loan in February 2017, for the remainder of the season.

After leaving Celtic at the end of the 2016–17 season, Donnelly signed as an amateur for Scottish League One side Queen's Park for the 2017–18 season.

In the summer of 2018, Donnelly signed for Stranraer. In January 2019, he then moved to Arbroath signing an eighteen-month contract.

Donnelly returned to Alloa Athletic on 31 August 2022.

== Career statistics ==
As of 21 January 2020

Appearances and goals by club, season and competition
Club	Season	League			Scottish Cup		League Cup		Other		Total	
Club	Season	Division	Apps	Goals	Apps	Goals	Apps	Goals	Apps	Goals	Apps	Goals
Celtic	2014–15	Scottish Premiership	0	0	0	0	0	0	0	0	0	0
Celtic	2015–16	Scottish Premiership	0	0	0	0	0	0	0	0	0	0
Celtic	2016–17	Scottish Premiership	0	0	0	0	0	0	0	0	0	0
Celtic	Total		0	0	0	0	0	0	0	0	0	0
East Stirlingshire (loan)	2014–15	Scottish League Two	17	1	0	0	0	0	0	0	17	1
Alloa Athletic (loan)	2016–17	Scottish League One	6	1	0	0	0	0	3 (Note: Appearances in the Scottish Challenge Cup)	0	9	1
Greenock Morton (loan)	2016–17	Scottish Championship	6	0	1	0	0	0	0	0	7	0
Queen's Park	2017–18	Scottish League One	26	8	0	0	0	0	2 (Note: Appearances in the Scottish League One play-offs)	0	28	8
Stranraer	2018–19	Scottish League One	18	4	1	0	4	1	1	0	24	5
Arbroath	2018–19	Scottish League One	13	1	0	0	0	0	0	0	13	1
Arbroath	2019–20	Scottish Championship	17	5	3	0	1	0	2	0	23	5
Arbroath	Total		30	6	3	0	1	0	2	0	36	6
Career total			103	20	5	0	5	1	8	0	121	21
