= Ricky Little =

Scottish footballer

Personal information
- Date of birth: 20 May 1989 (age 37)
- Place of birth: Stevenston, Scotland
- Height: 1.75 m (5 ft 9 in)
- Positions: Centre-back; right-back

Team information
- Current team: Beith Juniors

Youth career
- Ayr United
- Ardrossan Winton Rovers

Senior career*
Years	Team	Apps	(Gls)
2007	Ardrossan Winton Rovers		
2007–2010	Partick Thistle	4	(0)
2008	→ Queen's Park (loan)	11	(0)
2009	→ Queen's Park (loan)	7	(0)
2010–2013	Queen's Park	116	(1)
2013–2024	Arbroath	318	(11)
2024–	Beith Juniors	0	(0)
- * Club domestic league appearances and goals as of 3 May 2024

Ricky Little (born 20 May 1989) is a Scottish footballer who plays as a defender for Beith Juniors in the West of Scotland Football League.

== Career ==
Little began his youth career on the books of the Ayr United youth squad and Ardrossan Winton Rovers, and he captained Scotland schoolboys under-18s in season 2006–07.

When he moved into the senior game, he featured on the subs bench for the Partick Thistle first team several times to cover for injury under Ian McCall.

Little was sent on a month's loan to Queen's Park on 17 September 2008, as he was too old to play for the Firhill side's under 19 side.

Little joined up with Queen's Park again on loan for two months in November 2009. Following his release from the Jags in Jan 2010, he rejoined Queen's Park permanently until the end of the season. He signed a new contract with Queen's Park at the beginning of season 2010–11 and was nominated for PFA Scotland Scottish Third Division Player of the Year at the end of a season that also saw him named club captain.

After spending three years at Queen's Park, in June 2013, Arbroath manager Paul Sheerin signed Little to replace Stuart Malcolm who signed for Forfar Athletic. Shortly after joining the club, he suffered an injury in a Scottish Challenge Cup match against Stenhousemuir, which kept him out for six months.

On 2 May 2015, Little scored from his own half as Arbroath beat Berwick Rangers 5–0. He would go on to become a mainstay of the Arbroath defence, which saw him once again named in the PFA Scotland Team of the Year for Scottish League One in 2015–16. He was also part of the squads that won the 2016–17 Scottish League Two and 2018–19 Scottish League One titles.

Following his release from Arbroath in the summer of 2024, Little returned to junior football, signing for Beith Juniors in the West of Scotland Football League.

== Career statistics ==
As of match played 18 January 2020

Appearances and goals by club, season and competition
Club	Season	League			Scottish Cup		League Cup		Other		Total	
Club	Season	Division	Apps	Goals	Apps	Goals	Apps	Goals	Apps	Goals	Apps	Goals
Partick Thistle	2007–08	Scottish First Division	3	0	0	0	0	0	0	0	3	0
Partick Thistle	2008–09	Scottish First Division	1	0	0	0	0	0	0	0	1	0
Partick Thistle	2009–10	Scottish First Division	0	0	0	0	0	0	0	0	0	0
Partick Thistle	Total		4	0	0	0	0	0	0	0	4	0
Queen's Park (loan)	2008–09	Scottish Second Division	11	0	1	0	0	0	0	0	12	0
Queen's Park (loan)	2009–10	Scottish Third Division	7	0	0	0	0	0	0	0	7	0
Queen's Park	2009–10	Scottish Third Division	17	0	0	0	0	0	2 (Note: Appearances in the Second Division play-offs)	0	19	0
Queen's Park	2010–11	Scottish Third Division	35	1	1	0	1	0	4 (Note: Two appearances in the Scottish Challenge Cup and two appearances in the Second Division play-offs)	0	41	1
Queen's Park	2011–12	Scottish Third Division	33	0	4	0	1	0	3 (Note: One appearance in the Scottish Challenge Cup and two appearances in the Second Division play-offs)	0	41	0
Queen's Park	2012–13	Scottish Third Division	31	0	3	0	3	0	2	1	39	1
Queen's Park	Total		116	1	8	0	5	0	11	1	140	2
Arbroath	2013–14	Scottish League One	10	0	0	0	0	0	1	0	11	0
Arbroath	2014–15	Scottish League Two	25	2	5	0	1	0	3 (Note: One appearance in the Scottish Challenge Cup and two appearances in the League One play-offs)	0	34	2
Arbroath	2015–16	Scottish League Two	33	1	3	0	1	0	1	0	38	1
Arbroath	2016–17	Scottish League Two	34	2	2	0	2	0	2	1	40	3
Arbroath	2017–18	Scottish League One	35	0	2	0	4	0	3 (Note: One appearance in the Scottish Challenge Cup and two appearances in the League One play-offs)	0	44	0
Arbroath	2018–19	Scottish League One	36	3	1	0	4	0	2	0	43	3
Arbroath	2019–20	Scottish Championship	20	0	3	0	2	0	2	0	27	0
Arbroath	Total		193	8	16	0	14	0	14	1	237	9
Career total			331	9	25	0	19	0	25	2	400	11

== Honours ==
=== Club ===
Arbroath

- Scottish League Two: 2016–17
- Scottish League One: 2018–19

=== Individual ===
- Scottish League One Player of the Month: November 2018
- PFA Scotland Scottish Third Division Team of the Year: 2011–12, 2012–13
- PFA Scotland Scottish League Two Team of the Year: 2015–16, 2016–17
- PFA Scotland Scottish League One Team of the Year: 2018–19
