= 2022–23 Hamilton Academical F.C. season =

Hamilton Academical
2022–23 season
- Chairman: Allan Maitland
- Manager: John Rankin
- Stadium: New Douglas Park
- Scottish Championship: Ninth place (Relegated via play-offs)
- Scottish Cup: Fifth round
- League Cup: Group stage
- Challenge Cup: Winners
- Top goalscorer: League: Andy Winter (7); All: Andy Ryan (9)
- Highest home attendance: 4,731 vs. Heart of Midlothian, Scottish Cup, 10 February 2023
- Lowest home attendance: 447 vs. Stranraer, League Cup, 12 July 2022
- Average home league attendance: 1,441
Home colours	Away colours	Challenge Cup final colours

The 2022–23 season was Hamilton Academical's second season back in the second tier of Scottish football, following their relegation from the Scottish Premiership at the end of the 2020–21 season. Hamilton also competed in the League Cup, Challenge Cup and the Scottish Cup.

== Summary ==
=== Management ===
Former Hamilton player and assistant manager Stuart Taylor returned to the club after being appointed as their new head coach on 20 August 2021.

Taylor would step down from his role on 23 June 2022 after 10 months in charge. John Rankin, who had been first-team coach under Taylor, was promoted to the position of head coach 5 days later.

On 20 May 2023, following a play-off draw with Lanarkshire derby rivals Airdrieonians, Hamilton were relegated to League One after losing 5–6 on penalties and dropped down to the third tier of Scottish football for the first time since 2005.

== Results and fixtures ==
Win Draw Loss Postponed

=== Pre-season and friendlies ===
23 June 2022 Friendly	Hamilton Academical	3–0	(Northern Ireland) Larne	Hamilton
13:00 BST	Martin 16'; Ryan 47'; McGowan 64'	Report		Stadium: New Douglas Park

25 June 2022 Friendly	Larkhall Thistle	0–4	Hamilton Academical	Larkhall
12:00 BST			Ryan; Forsyth; Trialist	Stadium: Gasworks Park

25 June 2022 Friendly	Newmains United	0–9	Hamilton Academical	Newmains
15:00 BST		Report	Smith 10', 30'; Winter 24'; Brown 45', 47'; Black 47', 58'; Oné 79'; Forsyth 88'	Stadium: Victoria Park

2 July 2022 Friendly	Hamilton Academical	1–3	Queen of the South	Hamilton
15:00 BST	Winter 17'	Report	Murray 6'; Fulton 74' (o.g.); Connelly 90'	Stadium: New Douglas Park

5 July 2022 Friendly	Tranent	0–4	Hamilton Academical	Tranent
19:00 BST		Report	Winter 24'; Lawson; Trialist	Stadium: Foresters Park

=== Scottish Championship ===
30 July 2022 1	Hamilton Academical	1–1	Greenock Morton	Hamilton
15:00 BST	Ryan 12'; Want (red card) 40'	Report	Gillespie 42' (pen.)	Stadium: New Douglas Park; Attendance: 1,367; Referee: Mike Roncone

6 August 2022 2	Partick Thistle	1–1	Hamilton Academical	Glasgow
15:00 BST	Graham 83'	Report	McMillan 43' (o.g.)	Stadium: Firhill Stadium; Attendance: 2,970; Referee: Craig Napier

13 August 2022 3	Ayr United	2–2	Hamilton Academical	Ayr
15:00 BST	Akinyemi 3'; Murdoch 85'	Report	Winter 14'; O'Reilly 73'	Stadium: Somerset Park; Attendance: 2,014; Referee: Gavin Duncan

20 August 2022 4	Hamilton Academical	0–2	Raith Rovers	Hamilton
15:00 BST		Report	Easton 2'; Gullan 74'	Stadium: New Douglas Park; Attendance: 1,548; Referee: Calum Scott

27 August 2022 5	Hamilton Academical	1–0	Arbroath	Hamilton
15:00 BST	Lawson 58' (pen.)	Report	O'Brien (red card) 56'	Stadium: New Douglas Park; Attendance: 1,317; Referee: David Munro

3 September 2022 6	Cove Rangers	2–2	Hamilton Academical	Aberdeen
15:00 BST	Masson 56'; McIntosh 84'	Report	Tiéhi 41'; O'Reilly 59'	Stadium: Balmoral Stadium; Attendance: 661; Referee: Alan Newlands

17 September 2022 7	Hamilton Academical	0–2	Queen's Park	Hamilton
15:00 BST		Report	Murray 43'; Savoury 52'	Stadium: New Douglas Park; Attendance: 1,472; Referee: Graham Grainger

1 October 2022 8	Hamilton Academical	0–2	Dundee	Hamilton
15:00 BST		Report	Cameron 43'; McMullan 90+5'	Stadium: New Douglas Park; Attendance: 1,642; Referee: Matthew MacDermid

8 October 2022 9	Greenock Morton	5–0	Hamilton Academical	Greenock
15:00 BST	Baird 8'; Kabia 16'; Gillespie 23'; Muirhead 48', 54'	Report		Stadium: Cappielow; Attendance: 1,361; Referee: Duncan Williams

15 October 2022 10	Hamilton Academical	1–2	Partick Thistle	Hamilton
15:00 BST	Ryan 53'	Report	Graham 33'; Tiffoney 65'	Stadium: New Douglas Park; Attendance: 1,991; Referee: Barry Cook

18 October 2022 11	Inverness CT	0–1	Hamilton Academical	Inverness
19:45 BST		Report	Winter 22'	Stadium: Caledonian Stadium; Attendance: 2,052; Referee: Alan Newlands

22 October 2022 12	Arbroath	1–0	Hamilton Academical	Arbroath
19:45 BST	Linn 45'	Report	O'Reilly (red card) 55'	Stadium: Gayfield Park; Attendance: 1,588; Referee: Peter Stuart

29 October 2022 13	Hamilton Academical	4–4	Cove Rangers	Hamilton
15:00 BST	Winter 44'; Ryan 53', 89'; Lawson 63' (pen.)	Report	Reynolds 10'; Megginson 42' (pen.), 48'; McDonagh 52'	Stadium: New Douglas Park; Attendance: 1,098; Referee: Barry Cook

5 November 2022 14	Raith Rovers	3–1	Hamilton Academical	Kirkcaldy
19:45 BST	Easton 5'; Connolly 50' (pen.); Dick 80'	Report	Tiéhi 17'	Stadium: Stark's Park; Attendance: 1,890; Referee: Scott Lambie

11 November 2022 15	Hamilton Academical	2–3	Ayr United	Hamilton
19:45 BST	Lawson 50' (pen.); Ecrepont 80' (o.g.)	Report	Akinyemi 4', 69'; Dempsey 83' (pen.)	Stadium: New Douglas Park; Attendance: 1,677; Referee: Matthew MacDermid

19 November 2022 16	Dundee	1–0	Hamilton Academical	Dundee
15:00 BST	McMullan 57'	Report		Stadium: Dens Park; Attendance: 4,293; Referee: Graham Grainger

3 December 2022 17	Queen's Park	4–0	Hamilton Academical	Glasgow
15:00 BST	Savoury 25', 45+2'; Murray 28'; McPake 36'	Report		Stadium: Hampden Park; Attendance: 3,231; Referee: William Collum

23 December 2022 18	Cove Rangers	2–0	Hamilton Academical	Aberdeen
19:45 BST	McIntosh 84', 87'	Report		Stadium: Balmoral Stadium; Attendance: 695; Referee: Euan Anderson

2 January 2023 19	Hamilton Academical	0–1	Raith Rovers	Hamilton
15:00 BST		Report	Gullan 17'	Stadium: New Douglas Park; Attendance: 1,192; Referee: Lloyd Wilson

7 January 2023 20	Ayr United	1–0	Hamilton Academical	Ayr
19:45 BST	Mullin 32'	Report		Stadium: Somerset Park; Attendance: 1,988; Referee: Calum Scott

14 January 2023 21	Hamilton Academical	1–0	Greenock Morton	Hamilton
15:00 BST	Winter 19' (pen.)	Report	Gillespie (red card) 83'	Stadium: New Douglas Park; Attendance: 1,247; Referee: Duncan Williams

28 January 2023 22	Partick Thistle	0–1	Hamilton Academical	Glasgow
15:00 BST		Report	Stephenson 54'	Stadium: Firhill Stadium; Attendance: 2,868; Referee: Greg Aitken

4 February 2023 23	Hamilton Academical	1–1	Dundee	Hamilton
15:00 BST	Smith 5'	Report	McGhee 38'	Stadium: New Douglas Park; Attendance: 1,649; Referee: Don Robertson

18 February 2023 24	Inverness CT	0–3	Hamilton Academical	Inverness
15:00 BST		Report	De Bolle 47'; Tiéhi 80'; Smith 87' (pen.)	Stadium: Caledonian Stadium; Attendance: 2,471; Referee: Matthew MacDermid

21 February 2023 25	Hamilton Academical	2–1	Inverness CT	Hamilton
19:45 BST	O'Reilly 19'; Smith 73' (pen.)	Report	Allardice 43'; McKay (red card) 90+4'	Stadium: New Douglas Park; Attendance: 752; Referee: Colin Steven

25 February 2023 26	Hamilton Academical	1–4	Queen's Park	Hamilton
15:00 BST	Zanatta 68'	Report	Thomson 30'; Healy 57'; Shields 63', 76'	Stadium: New Douglas Park; Referee: William Collum

3 March 2023 27	Hamilton Academical	0–0	Arbroath	Hamilton
19:45 BST		Report	Little (red card) 19'	Stadium: New Douglas Park; Attendance: 1,832; Referee: Craig Napier

18 March 2023 28	Hamilton Academical	0–2	Ayr United	Hamilton
15:00 BST		Report	Dempsey 12' (pen.); Ashford 27'	Stadium: New Douglas Park; Attendance: 1,284; Referee: Calum Scott

1 April 2023 29	Dundee	7–0	Hamilton Academical	Dundee
15:00 BST	Jakubiak 7'; Sweeney 16'; Cameron 45', 72', 76'; McCowan 45+4'; Thomas 84'	Report		Stadium: Dens Park; Attendance: 5,019; Referee: Kevin Clancy

4 April 2023 30	Raith Rovers	1–2	Hamilton Academical	Kirkcaldy
19:45 BST	Lawson 50' (o.g.)	Report	McGowan 62'; Ashley-Seal 64'; Tiéhi (red card) 90+3'	Stadium: Stark's Park; Attendance: 1,691; Referee: Euan Anderson

8 April 2023 31	Hamilton Academical	1–1	Cove Rangers	Hamilton
15:00 BST	Smith 62' (pen.)	Report	Longstaff 57'	Stadium: New Douglas Park; Attendance: 1,157; Referee: Mike Roncone

11 April 2023 32	Greenock Morton	2–0	Hamilton Academical	Greenock
19:45 BST	Gillespie 54'; King 66'	Report		Stadium: Cappielow; Attendance: 1,489; Referee: Matthew MacDermid

14 April 2023 33	Queen's Park	1–0	Hamilton Academical	Stenhousemuir
19:45 BST	Savoury 74'	Report		Stadium: Ochilview Park; Attendance: 679; Referee: Calum Scott

18 April 2023 34	Hamilton Academical	1–2	Inverness CT	Hamilton
15:00 BST	Smith 72'	Report	Shaw 75'; McKay 88'	Stadium: New Douglas Park; Attendance: 1,316; Referee: Graham Grainger

22 April 2023 35	Hamilton Academical	2–2	Partick Thistle	Hamilton
15:00 BST	O'Reilly 36', 89'	Report	Graham 28'; Lawless 90+2'	Stadium: New Douglas Park; Attendance: 2,093; Referee: David Dickinson

5 May 2023 36	Arbroath	0–0	Hamilton Academical	Arbroath
19:45 BST		Report		Stadium: Gayfield Park; Attendance: 2,736; Referee: Steven McLean

==== Championship Play-off ====
9 May 2023 Semi-final 1st Leg	Alloa Athletic	1–0	Hamilton Academical	Alloa
19:45 BST	Donnelly 45+2'	Report		Stadium: Recreation Park; Attendance: 1,011; Referee: Greg Aitken

13 May 2023 Semi-final 2nd Leg	Hamilton Academical	5–2 (5–3 agg.)	Alloa Athletic	Hamilton
15:00 BST	Zanatta 37', 45'; Winter 39', 45+1', 52'	Report	Sammon 5'; Stanger (red card) 24'; Scougall 32'	Stadium: New Douglas Park; Attendance: 1,353; Referee: Chris Graham

17 May 2023 Final 1st Leg	Airdrieonians	1–0	Hamilton Academical	Airdrie
19:35 BST	Smith 56'; Watson (red card) 90+2'	Report		Stadium: Excelsior Stadium; Attendance: 3,118; Referee: Steven Kirkland

20 May 2023 Final 2nd Leg	Hamilton Academical	2–1 (a.e.t.) (2–2 agg.) (5–6 p)	Airdrieonians	Hamilton
17:15 BST	Smith 23'; Tiéhi 80'	Report	McGill 90+1'	Stadium: New Douglas Park; Attendance: 3,429; Referee: Craig Napier

=== Scottish League Cup ===
==== Group stage ====
9 July 2022 1	Dundee	3–0	Hamilton Academical	Dundee
15:00 BST	McGinn 25'; Jakubiak 48' (pen.); Cameron 90+1'	Report		Stadium: Dens Park; Attendance: 1,760; Referee: Gavin Duncan

12 July 2022 2	Hamilton Academical	5–2	Stranraer	Hamilton
19:45 BST	Winter 49'; Ryan 51'; Shiels 53', 55'; Smith 78'	Report	Woods 68' (pen.), 88' (pen.)	Stadium: New Douglas Park; Attendance: 447; Referee: Graham Grainger

16 July 2022 3	Forfar Athletic	0–3	Hamilton Academical	Forfar
15:00 BST		Report	Shiels 45'; Ryan 50'; Winter 65'	Stadium: Station Park, Forfar; Attendance: 409; Referee: Alex Shepherd

23 July 2022 4	Hamilton Academical	1–1 (5–3 p)	Queen's Park	Hamilton
15:00 BST	Winter 4'	Report	Davidson 78'	Stadium: New Douglas Park; Attendance: 786; Referee: Don Robertson

=== Scottish Challenge Cup ===
8 November 2022 Third round	Rangers B	0–3	Hamilton Academical	Dumbarton
19:45 BST			Zanatta 32', 73'; Mimnaugh 51' (pen.)	Stadium: Dumbarton Football Stadium; Attendance: 404; Referee: Dan McFarlane

10 December 2022 Fourth round	Hamilton Academical	2–0	Inverness CT	Hamilton
15:00 BST	Nixon 4' (o.g.); Mimnaugh 33'			Stadium: New Douglas Park; Attendance: 488; Referee: Duncan Williams

10 January 2023 Quarter-final	Hamilton Academical	3–2	Clyde	Hamilton
19:45 BST	Owens 31'; Tiéhi 54'; O'Reilly 82'		Cunningham 9'; Smith 36' (o.g.)	Stadium: New Douglas Park; Attendance: 630; Referee: Greg Aitken

7 February 2023 Semi-final	Hamilton Academical	2–1 (a.e.t.)	Queen of the South	Hamilton
19:45 BST	Zanatta 21'; Oné 96'	Report	Irving 72'	Stadium: New Douglas Park; Attendance: 1,049; Referee: Craig Napier

26 March 2023 Final	Raith Rovers	0–1	Hamilton Academical	Falkirk
16:15 BST		Report	Tumilty 30'; O'Reilly (red card) 55'	Stadium: Falkirk Stadium; Attendance: 5,566; Referee: Colin Steven

=== Scottish Cup ===
26 November 2022 Third round	Hamilton Academical	4–0	East Kilbride	Hamilton
15:00 BST	Ryan 37', 70', 75'; Oné 73'	Report		Stadium: New Douglas Park; Attendance: 1,171; Referee: Grant Irvine

21 January 2023 Fourth round	Hamilton Academical	0–0 (a.e.t.) (5–3 p)	Ross County	Hamilton
15:00 BST		Report		Stadium: New Douglas Park; Attendance: 783; Referee: Grant Irvine

10 February 2023 Fifth round	Hamilton Academical	0–2	Heart of Midlothian	Hamilton
19:45 BST		Report	Humphrys 29'; Devlin 79'	Stadium: New Douglas Park; Attendance: 4,731; Referee: Kevin Clancy

== Squad statistics ==
=== Appearances ===
As of 20 May 2023

No.	Pos	Nat	Player	Total		Championship		League Cup		Challenge Cup		Scottish Cup	
No.	Pos	Nat	Player	Apps	Goals	Apps	Goals	Apps	Goals	Apps	Goals	Apps	Goals
1	GK	(Scotland) SCO	Ryan Fulton	41	0	33	0	4	0	1	0	3	0
3	DF	(Scotland) SCO	Matthew Shiels	41	0	27+3	0	4	0	4	0	3	0
4	DF	(Republic of Ireland) IRL	Daniel O'Reilly	46	7	37	5	4	0	3	2	2	0
5	DF	(Scotland) SCO	Brian Easton	25	0	17	0	3	0	1+2	0	1+1	0
6	DF	(Scotland) SCO	Jamie Hamilton	0	0	0	0	0	0	0	0	0	0
7	MF	(Scotland) SCO	Lewis Spence	9	0	2+5	0	1+1	0	0	0	0	0
8	MF	(Scotland) SCO	Scott Martin	46	0	37	0	3	0	2+1	0	3	0
9	FW	(England) ENG	Benny Ashley-Seal	9	1	6+2	1	0	0	1	0	0	0
10	FW	(Canada) CAN	Dario Zanatta	38	6	15+16	3	0	0	3+1	3	1+2	0
11	MF	(Scotland) SCO	Lewis Smith	45	1	22+12	0	3+1	1	4	0	3	0
12	DF	(Wales) WAL	Tom Sparrow	17	0	11+3	0	0	0	0+2	0	1	0
14	MF	(Scotland) SCO	Marley Redfern	4	0	0+3	0	0	0	1	0	0	0
15	DF	(Australia) AUS	Dylan McGowan	24	1	20	1	0	0	2	0	2	0
16	FW	(England) ENG	Dylan Stephenson	12	1	2+8	1	0	0	1	0	1	0
17	FW	(France) FRA	Jean-Pierre Tiéhi	40	5	21+13	4	0	0	3+1	1	2	0
18	MF	(Scotland) SCO	Reegan Mimnaugh	31	2	19+5	0	1+1	0	4	2	1	0
19	FW	(Scotland) SCO	Andy Winter	48	7	30+8	7	3+1	0	1+2	0	3	0
21	FW	(Scotland) SCO	Connor Smith	19	6	18+1	6	0	0	0	0	0	0
22	DF	(Scotland) SCO	Reghan Tumilty	20	1	17	0	0	0	1+1	1	1	0
23	MF	(Scotland) SCO	Lucas De Bolle	26	1	16+5	1	0	0	3	0	2	0
24	MF	(Togo) TOG	Steve Lawson	31	3	24+3	3	4	0	0	0	0	0
25	DF	(Scotland) SCO	Fergus Owens	25	1	13+4	0	1+1	0	4	1	2	0
31	GK	(Scotland) SCO	Jamie Smith	11	0	7	0	0	0	4	0	0	0
32	GK	(Republic of Ireland) IRL	Ryan Scully	0	0	0	0	0	0	0	0	0	0
37	DF	(Scotland) SCO	Chris McGinn	19	0	3+8	0	0+2	0	2+1	0	1+2	0
41	FW	(Scotland) SCO	Ryan Oné	28	2	2+16	0	0+4	0	3+1	1	0+2	1
42	DF	(Scotland) SCO	Cian Newbury	3	0	0	0	0+1	0	0+2	0	0	0
43	MF	(Scotland) SCO	Gabriel Forsyth	5	0	0+2	0	0	0	2	0	0+1	0
44	MF	(Scotland) SCO	Lewis Latona	2	0	0	0	0	0	1+1	0	0	0
45	FW	(Scotland) SCO	Ben Black	3	0	0	0	0	0	0+2	0	0+1	0
Players who left the club during the 2022–23 season
2	DF	(Scotland) SCO	Michael Doyle	28	0	20+1	0	4	0	3	0	0	0
9	FW	(Scotland) SCO	Andy Ryan	19	9	11+2	4	4	2	0	0	1+1	3
12	DF	(Scotland) SCO	Shaun Want	5	0	1+1	0	3	0	0	0	0	0
16	MF	(Finland) FIN	Miko Virtanen	5	0	2+3	0	0	0	0	0	0	0
20	MF	(England) ENG	Jonny Ngandu	14	0	5+4	0	2+2	0	1	0	0	0
22	MF	(England) ENG	Ellis Brown	8	0	2+2	0	0+2	0	0+1	0	1	0
36	FW	(Scotland) SCO	Myles Gaffney	0	0	0	0	0	0	0	0	0	0

== Team statistics ==
=== League table ===
Pos	Team	Pld	W	D	L	GF	GA	GD	Pts	Promotion, qualification or relegation
6	Inverness Caledonian Thistle	36	15	10	11	52	47	+5	55	
7	Raith Rovers	36	11	10	15	46	49	−3	43	
8	Arbroath	36	6	16	14	29	47	−18	34	
9	Hamilton Academical (R)	36	7	10	19	31	63	−32	31	Qualification for the Championship play-offs
10	Cove Rangers (R)	36	7	10	19	38	75	−37	31	Relegation to League One

Rules for classification: 1) Points; 2) Goal difference; 3) Goals scored; 4) Head-to-to head points; 5) Head-to-head goal difference; 6) Play-off (only for deciding promotion, play-off participation and relegation).
(R) Relegated

=== League Cup table ===
Pos	Team	Pld	W	PW	PL	L	GF	GA	GD	Pts	Qualification	DND	HAM	QPA	FOR	STR
1	Dundee	4	4	0	0	0	13	2	+11	12	Qualification for the second round	—	3–0	—	5–1	—
2	Hamilton Academical	4	2	1	0	1	9	6	+3	8		—	—	p1–1	—	5–2
3	Queen's Park	4	2	0	1	1	11	6	+5	7		1–2	—	—	4–1	—
4	Forfar Athletic	4	1	0	0	3	5	12	−7	3		—	0–3	—	—	3–0 (Note: Forfar Athletic were awarded a technical 3−0 win over Stranraer, who fielded an ineligible player. The match had originally finished 2–2, with Forfar Athletic securing the bonus point following a 5–3 win on penalties.)
5	Stranraer	4	0	0	0	4	4	16	−12	0		0–3	—	2–5	—	—

Rules for classification: 1) goal difference, 2) goals scored, 3) away goals scored, 4) matches won, 5) away matches won, 6) drawing of lots.

== Transfers ==
=== Players in ===
Player	From	Fee
(England) Jonny Ngandu	(England) Coventry City	Free
(Scotland) Michael Doyle	(Scotland) Queen's Park	Free
(Scotland) Regan Thomson	(England) Newcastle United	Free
(Canada) Dario Zanatta	(Scotland) Raith Rovers	Free
(Republic of Ireland) Ryan Scully	Free agent	Free
(Scotland) Reghan Tumilty	(England) Hartlepool United	Free
(England) Benny Ashley-Seal	(Finland) KTP	Free

=== Players out ===
Player	To	Fee
(Scotland) Ben Stirling	(Scotland) Edinburgh City	Free
(Scotland) Ronan Hughes	(Scotland) East Kilbride	Free
(Scotland) Kieran MacDonald	(Scotland) Edinburgh City	Free
(Zimbabwe) David Moyo	(England) Barrow	Free
(Scotland) Shaun Want	(Northern Ireland) Larne	Free
(Scotland) Regan Thomson	(Scotland) Syngenta	Free
(Finland) Miko Virtanen	(Scotland) Cove Rangers	Free
(Scotland) Andy Ryan	(Northern Ireland) Larne	Free
(England) Ellis Brown	Free agent	Free

=== Loans in ===
Player	From	Fee
(France) Jean-Pierre Tiéhi	(England) Fulham	Loan
(Scotland) Lucas De Bolle	(England) Newcastle United	Loan
(Australia) Dylan McGowan	(Scotland) Kilmarnock	Loan
(Wales) Tom Sparrow	(England) Stoke City	Loan
(England) Dylan Stephenson	(England) Newcastle United	Loan
(Scotland) Connor Smith	(Scotland) Heart of Midlothian	Loan

=== Loans out ===
Player	To	Fee
(Scotland) Adam McGowan	(Scotland) Tranent	Loan
(Scotland) Myles Gaffney	(Scotland) Tranent	Loan
(Scotland) Myles Gaffney	(Scotland) Dalbeattie Star	Loan
(Scotland) Michael Doyle	(Scotland) Alloa Athletic	Loan
(England) Jonny Ngandu	(Scotland) Stranraer	Loan
