= 2023–24 Hamilton Academical F.C. season =

Hamilton Academical
2023–24 season
- Chairman: Allan Maitland (until 20 July); John Brown
- Manager: John Rankin
- Stadium: New Douglas Park
- Scottish League One: Second place (Promoted via play-offs)
- Scottish Cup: Third round
- League Cup: Group stage
- Challenge Cup: Quarter-final
- Top goalscorer: League: Kevin O'Hara (17); All: Kevin O'Hara (19)
- Highest home attendance: 3,821, vs. Falkirk, League One, 16 December 2023
- Lowest home attendance: 530, vs. Brechin City, League Cup, 18 July 2023
- Average home league attendance: 1,293
Home colours	Away colours

The 2023–24 season is Hamilton Academical's first season back in the third tier of Scottish football, following their relegation from the Scottish Championship at the end of the 2022–23 season. Hamilton will also compete in the League Cup, Challenge Cup and the Scottish Cup.

== Summary ==
On 20 May 2023, following a play-off draw with Lanarkshire derby rivals Airdrieonians, Hamilton were relegated to League One after losing 5–6 on penalties. It will be the club's first appearance in the third tier of Scottish football since 2005.

On 20 July, the club announced that the proposed takeover by 1874 Holding Limited had been successfully completed, with Seref Zengin appointed as the club's new CEO.

== Results and fixtures ==
Win Draw Loss Postponed

=== Pre-season and friendlies ===
30 June 2023 Friendly	Hamilton Academical XI	11–1	Thorniewood United	Hamilton
19:00 BST	O'Hara 4', 17', 32'; Zanatta 37'; Henderson 56', 76', 86' (pen.); Oné 60', 88'; Owens 78'; Tumilty 83'		Trialist 50'	Stadium: New Douglas Park

1 July 2023 Friendly	Blantyre Victoria	0–3	Hamilton Academical XI	Blantyre
12:00 BST			Longridge 12'; White 34' (o.g.); Henderson 47'	Stadium: KG Stadium; Attendance: 440

1 July 2023 Friendly	Newmains United	0–12	Hamilton Academical XI	Newmains
15:30 BST			Trialist 1', 6', 33'; Winter 5'; Oné 12', 58'; MacDonald 18' (pen.); McGlynn 25'; Spence 67'; Black 70', 73'; Meechan 80'	Stadium: Victoria Park

3 July 2023 Friendly	Hamilton Academical	2–1	(Wales) The New Saints	Hamilton
19:00 BST	O'Hara 7' (pen.); McGlynn 85'	Report	McManus 10'	Stadium: New Douglas Park

8 July 2023 Friendly	Cumbernauld Colts	3–1	Hamilton Academical	Cumbernauld
14:00 BST	McIntyre 17', 22', 47'		Winter 4'	Stadium: Broadwood Stadium

=== Scottish League One ===
5 August 2023 1	Hamilton Academical	1–0	Cove Rangers	Hamilton
15:00	Kerr 35' (o.g.)	Report	McGowan (red card) 82'	Stadium: New Douglas Park; Attendance: 1,087; Referee: Lloyd Wilson

12 August 2023 2	Kelty Hearts	0–2	Hamilton Academical	Kelty
15:00		Report	Tumility 59'; Oné 68'	Stadium: New Central Park; Attendance: 607; Referee: Scott Lambie

19 August 2023 3	Edinburgh City	0–3	Hamilton Academical	Edinburgh
15:00	Hamilton (red card) 83'	Report	MacDonald 19'; Oné 67'; Murray 81'	Stadium: Meadowbank Stadium; Attendance: 525; Referee: Iain Snedden

26 August 2023 4	Hamilton Academical	1–0	Montrose	Hamilton
15:00	Tait 4'	Report		Stadium: New Douglas Park; Attendance: 1,345; Referee: Peter Stuart

2 September 2023 5	Stirling Albion	2–2	Hamilton Academical	Stirling
15:00	Cooper 44'; Banner 76'	Report	Henderson 30'; O'Hara 38'	Stadium: Forthbank Stadium; Attendance: 1,073; Referee: Chris Fordyce

16 September 2023 6	Hamilton Academical	2–1	Alloa Athletic	Hamilton
15:00	Henderson 47'; McGlynn 90+3'	Report	Donnelly 69'	Stadium: New Douglas Park; Attendance: 1,259; Referee: George Calder

23 September 2023 7	Queen of the South	1–2	Hamilton Academical	Dumfries
15:00	Cochrane 28'	Report	Henderson 15'; Longridge 84'	Stadium: Palmerston Park; Attendance: 1,250; Referee: Steven Kirkland

29 September 2023 8	Hamilton Academical	5–0	Annan Athletic	Hamilton
19:45	Barjonas 2'; Tumilty 48'; Henderson 58'; Murray 69'; McGlynn 77'	Report		Stadium: New Douglas Park; Attendance: 1,453; Referee: Gavin Duncan

7 October 2023 9	Falkirk	0–0	Hamilton Academical	Falkirk
17:30				Stadium: Falkirk Stadium; Attendance: 4,837; Referee: Euan Anderson

21 October 2023 10	Hamilton Academical	1–1	Edinburgh City	Hamilton
15:00	MacDonald 35'	Report	Shanley 52'	Stadium: New Douglas Park; Attendance: 1,264; Referee: Chris Graham

28 October 2023 11	Montrose	0–3	Hamilton Academical	Montrose
17:30		Report	McGlynn 41'; Barjonas 58'; MacDonald 85'	Stadium: Links Park; Attendance: 574; Referee: Euan Anderson

4 November 2023 12	Cove Rangers	1–0	Hamilton Academical	Cove Bay
15:00	Fyvie 61'	Report		Stadium: Balmoral Stadium; Attendance: 507; Referee: Colin Steven

11 November 2023 13	Hamilton Academical	5–0	Stirling Albion	Hamilton
15:00	O'Hara 14', 56', 78'; Henderson 38', 69'	Report	Hilson (red card) 90+1'	Stadium: New Douglas Park; Attendance: 1,433; Referee: Chris Fordyce

28 November 2023 14	Annan Athletic	1–2	Hamilton Academical	Annan
19:45	Garrity 23'	Report	Longridge 13'; Smith 19'; Kilday (red card) 49'	Stadium: Galabank; Attendance: 396; Referee: Stewart Luke

2 December 2023 15	Hamilton Academical	5–0	Queen of the South	Hamilton
15:00	O'Hara 5', 54'; Smith 38'; Tumilty 44'; Murray 89'	Report		Stadium: New Douglas Park; Attendance: 1,279; Referee: Lloyd Wilson

9 December 2023 16	Alloa Athletic	0–0	Hamilton Academical	Alloa
15:00		Report		Stadium: Recreation Park; Attendance: 680; Referee: Colin Steven

16 December 2023 17	Hamilton Academical	1–3	Falkirk	Hamilton
15:00	Smith 28'	Report	Morrison 23' (pen.), 79'; Miller 32'	Stadium: New Douglas Park; Attendance: 3,821; Referee: Calum Scott

23 December 2023 18	Hamilton Academical	1–1	Kelty Hearts	Hamilton
15:00	O'Hara 62'; Tait (red card) 79'	Report	Johnston 81'	Stadium: New Douglas Park; Attendance: 1,287; Referee: Colin Whyte

30 December 2023 19	Edinburgh City	2–5	Hamilton Academical	Edinburgh
15:00	See 47'; Mahon 68'	Report	MacDonald 12', 19'; Hewitt 24'; Henderson 30'; O'Hara 32'	Stadium: Meadowbank Stadium; Attendance: 339; Referee: George Calder

13 January 2024 21	Hamilton Academical	2–0	Cove Rangers	Hamilton
15:00	O'Hara 7'; Williamson (red card) 55'; Barjonas 71'	Report	Doyle (red card) 55'	Stadium: New Douglas Park; Attendance: 1,436; Referee: Ross Hardie

27 January 2024 22	Hamilton Academical	1–1	Montrose	Hamilton
15:00	O'Hara 16'	Report	Graham 84'	Stadium: New Douglas Park; Attendance: 778; Referee: Calum Scott

3 February 2024 23	Queen of the South	0–2	Hamilton Academical	Dumfries
15:00		Report	Smith 57'; O'Hara 66'	Stadium: Palmerston Park; Attendance: 1,264; Referee: Lloyd Wilson

10 February 2024 24	Hamilton Academical	2–3	Annan Athletic	Hamilton
15:00	Douglas 62' (o.g.); Davidson 90'	Report	Goss 33'; Gibson 50'; Walker 90+3'	Stadium: New Douglas Park; Attendance: 759; Referee: Steven Kirkland

17 February 2024 25	Falkirk	3–2	Hamilton Academical	Falkirk
15:00	Morrison 15'; MacIver 23'; Miller 27'	Report	Rose 32', 57'	Stadium: Falkirk Stadium; Attendance: 5,756; Referee: Colin Steven

24 February 2024 26	Hamilton Academical	1–2	Alloa Athletic	Hamilton
15:00	Henderson 61'	Report	Roberts 58'; Robertson 84'	Stadium: New Douglas Park; Attendance: 745; Referee: Craig Napier

27 February 2024 20	Stirling Albion	0–0	Hamilton Academical	Stirling
19:45		Report		Stadium: Forthbank Stadium; Attendance: 669; Referee: Peter Stuart
Note: Match postponed due to a frozen pitch.

2 March 2024 27	Kelty Hearts	0–5	Hamilton Academical	Kelty
15:00		Report	Davidson 3'; Rose 17', 32', 64'; Tumilty 50'	Stadium: New Central Park; Attendance: 520; Referee: Greg Soutar

9 March 2024 28	Hamilton Academical	1–0	Edinburgh City	Hamilton
15:00	Rose 43'	Report		Stadium: New Douglas Park; Attendance: 619; Referee: Dan McFarlane

16 March 2024 29	Hamilton Academical	3–0	Stirling Albion	Hamilton
15:00	O'Hara 20'; Rose 52'; Hastie 90+3'	Report		Stadium: New Douglas Park; Attendance: 762; Referee: Duncan Nicolson

23 March 2024 30	Cove Rangers	1–3	Hamilton Academical	Cove Bay
15:00	Scully 56'	Report	Scully 13' (o.g.); Henderson 83'; O'Hara 86'	Stadium: Balmoral Stadium; Attendance: 521; Referee: Graham Grainger

30 March 2024 31	Hamilton Academical	0–0	Queen of the South	Hamilton
15:00	Barjonas (red card) 84'	Report		Stadium: New Douglas Park; Attendance: 907; Referee: Ross Hardie

6 April 2024 32	Annan Athletic	1–3	Hamilton Academical	Annan
15:00	Smith 88'	Report	Muir 38' (o.g.); Williamson 61'; Hastie 85'	Stadium: Galabank; Attendance: 501; Referee: Greg Soutar

13 April 2024 33	Hamilton Academical	0–2	Falkirk	Hamilton
17:30		Report	MacIver 50'; Nesbitt 86'	Stadium: New Douglas Park; Attendance: 2,211; Referee: Craig Napier

20 April 2024 34	Montrose	1–2	Hamilton Academical	Montrose
15:00	Lyons 25'	Report	Barjonas 24'; Tumilty 77'	Stadium: Links Park; Attendance: 1,039; Referee: Alan Muir

27 April 2024 35	Alloa Athletic	0–1	Hamilton Academical	Alloa
15:00		Report	O'Hara 26'	Stadium: Recreation Park; Attendance: 665; Referee: Greg Soutar

4 May 2024 36	Hamilton Academical	4–1	Kelty Hearts	Hamilton
15:00	Morgan 7'; Hastie 25', 81'; Smith 78'	Report	Johnston 42'	Stadium: New Douglas Park; Attendance: 835; Referee: Lloyd Wilson

==== Championship play-off ====
7 May 2024 Semi-final 1st leg	Alloa Athletic	2–2	Hamilton Academical	Alloa
19:45	Steven 47'; Roberts 54'	Report	Henderson 31'; O'Hara 75'	Stadium: Recreation Park; Attendance: 1,077; Referee: Craig Napier

11 May 2024 Semi-final 2nd leg	Hamilton Academical	3–2 (5–4 agg.)	Alloa Athletic	Hamilton
15:00	Tumilty 18'; Smith 43'; Rose 77'	Report	Coulson 7'; Neill (red card) 45'; Sammon 57'	Stadium: New Douglas Park; Attendance: 1,027; Referee: Steven Kirkland

15 May 2024 Final 1st leg	Hamilton Academical	2–1	Inverness CT	Hamilton
19:45	Ridgers 6' (o.g.); Owens 22'	Report	Pepple 68'	Stadium: New Douglas Park; Attendance: 1,389; Referee: Graham Grainger

18 May 2024 Final 2nd leg	Inverness CT	2–3 (3–5 agg.)	Hamilton Academical	Inverness
17:30	Kerr 31'; Samuel 90+8'	Report	O'Hara 8', 41' (pen.); Smith 12'	Stadium: Caledonian Stadium; Attendance: 2,873; Referee: Euan Anderson

=== Scottish League Cup ===
==== Group stage ====
15 July 2023 1	Clyde	1–3	Hamilton Academical	Hamilton
15:00	Scullion 16'	Report	Winter 64'; McGlynn 88'; Martin 90+2'	Stadium: New Douglas Park; Attendance: 792; Referee: George Calder

18 July 2023 2	Hamilton Academical	1–0	Brechin City	Hamilton
19:45	O'Hara 22' (pen.)	Report		Stadium: New Douglas Park; Attendance: 530; Referee: Iain Snedden

22 July 2023 3	Livingston	1–1 (1–4 p)	Hamilton Academical	Livingston
15:00	Anderson 90'	Report	Winter 31'	Stadium: Almondvale Stadium; Attendance: 923; Referee: Craig Napier

29 July 2023 4	Hamilton Academical	2–2 (2–4 p)	Cove Rangers	Hamilton
19:45	O'Hara 13'; Tumility 90+6'	Report	Gallagher 44'; Burrell 60'	Stadium: New Douglas Park; Attendance: 659; Referee: Stewart Luke

=== Scottish Challenge Cup ===
9 September 2023 Third round	(Northern Ireland) Coleraine	1–3	Hamilton Academical	Coleraine
15:00	Lynch 24'	Report	Smith 11'; Zanatta 48'; Barjonas 82'	Stadium: The Showgrounds; Attendance: 906; Referee: Chris Morrison

14 October 2023 Fourth round	East Kilbride	2–5	Hamilton Academical	East Kilbride
15:00	McGowan 31'; Flanagan 53'	Report	Mumbongo 17'; Arnott 20' (o.g.); MacDonald 36' (pen.), 80'; Murray 38'	Stadium: K-Park Training Academy; Attendance: 583; Referee: Chris Fordyce

17 November 2023 Quarter-final	Hamilton Academical	1–4	Raith Rovers	Hamilton
19:45	Kilday (red card) 54'; Zanatta 73'	Report	Stanton 8'; Hamilton 58', 61'; Easton 90'	Stadium: New Douglas Park; Attendance: 971; Referee: Iain Snedden

=== Scottish Cup ===
25 November 2023 Third round	Hamilton Academical	0–2	Kelty Hearts	Hamilton
15:00	Longridge (red card) 90+4'	Report	Lyon 66'; Moore 75'	Stadium: New Douglas Park; Attendance: 519; Referee: Peter Stuart

=== UEFA Youth League ===
3 October 2023 First round 1st Leg	(Norway) Molde	3–0	Hamilton Academical	Molde
11:00	Juberg-Hovland 35'; Myklebust 62'; Ødegård 68'	UEFA Report		Stadium: Aker Stadion; Attendance: 221; Referee: Marian Barbu

24 October 2023 First round 2nd Leg	Hamilton Academical	4–2 (4–5 agg.)	(Norway) Molde	Hamilton
20:00	Black 40' (pen.), 44', 64' (pen.); Meechan 50'	UEFA Report	Nyheim 13'; Myklebust 74'	Stadium: New Douglas Park; Attendance: 695; Referee: Ante Čulina

== Squad statistics ==
=== Appearances ===
As of 18 May 2024

No.	Pos	Nat	Player	Total		League One + Playoffs		League Cup		Challenge Cup		Scottish Cup	
No.	Pos	Nat	Player	Apps	Goals	Apps	Goals	Apps	Goals	Apps	Goals	Apps	Goals
1	GK	(Scotland) SCO	Ryan Fulton	15	0	12	0	0	0	2	0	1	0
3	DF	(Scotland) SCO	Jackson Longridge	44	2	37	2	4	0	2	0	1	0
4	DF	(Scotland) SCO	Lee Kilday	36	0	24+5	0	4	0	3	0	0	0
5	DF	(Scotland) SCO	Jamie Hamilton	3	0	2+1	0	0	0	0	0	0	0
6	MF	(Scotland) SCO	Jamie Barjonas	46	6	33+5	5	3+1	0	1+2	1	1	0
7	FW	(Scotland) SCO	Euan Henderson	39	10	20+15	10	0	0	2+1	0	1	0
8	MF	(Scotland) SCO	Scott Martin	31	1	23+1	0	3	1	3	0	1	0
9	FW	(Scotland) SCO	Kevin O'Hara	44	19	35+2	17	4	2	1+1	0	1	0
10	FW	(Jamaica) JAM	Ahkeem Rose	17	8	10+7	8	0	0	0	0	0	0
11	MF	(Scotland) SCO	Lewis Smith	35	8	18+12	7	1+2	0	1	1	0+1	0
12	FW	(Scotland) SCO	Jake Hastie	16	4	4+12	4	0	0	0	0	0	0
14	MF	(Scotland) SCO	Marley Redfern	17	0	5+12	0	0	0	0	0	0	0
15	MF	(Scotland) SCO	Connor Murray	28	4	5+17	3	1+3	0	2	1	0	0
16	DF	(Scotland) SCO	Kyle MacDonald	33	6	24+1	4	3+1	0	3	2	1	0
18	DF	(Australia) AUS	Dylan McGowan	38	0	34	0	0	0	2+1	0	1	0
19	FW	(Scotland) SCO	Andy Winter	23	2	6+13	0	3+1	2	0	0	0	0
21	MF	(Scotland) SCO	Jake Davidson	16	2	14+2	2	0	0	0	0	0	0
22	DF	(Scotland) SCO	Reghan Tumilty	43	8	37	6	4	2	1	0	1	0
24	MF	(Scotland) SCO	Michael Hewitt	22	1	6+13	1	0	0	1+1	0	0+1	0
25	DF	(Scotland) SCO	Fergus Owens	16	1	12+3	1	0+1	0	0	0	0	0
27	FW	(Scotland) SCO	Liam Morgan	1	1	1	1	0	0	0	0	0	0
28	MF	(Scotland) SCO	Ben Williamson	17	1	16+1	1	0	0	0	0	0	0
29	FW	(Northern Ireland) NIR	Makenzie Kirk	8	0	1+7	0	0	0	0	0	0	0
30	GK	(England) ENG	Dean Lyness	15	0	15	0	0	0	0	0	0	0
31	GK	(Scotland) SCO	Jamie Smith	19	0	13+1	0	4	0	1	0	0	0
33	DF	(Scotland) SCO	Stephen Hendrie	23	0	7+9	0	4	0	2+1	0	0	0
44	FW	(Scotland) SCO	Lewis Latona	1	0	0+1	0	0	0	0	0	0	0
47	FW	(Scotland) SCO	Gravine Kalala	1	0	0+1	0	0	0	0	0	0	0
48	DF	(Scotland) SCO	Chris Neeson	1	0	1	0	0	0	0	0	0	0
49	DF	(Scotland) SCO	Arran Preston	1	0	0+1	0	0	0	0	0	0	0
Players who left the club during the 2023–24 season
2	DF	(Republic of Ireland) IRL	Josh O'Brien	14	0	6+2	0	4	0	0+2	0	0	0
10	FW	(Canada) CAN	Dario Zanatta	16	1	4+5	0	1+2	0	1+2	1	0+1	0
17	FW	(Scotland) SCO	Ryan Oné	8	2	0+4	2	1+3	0	0	0	0	0
17	FW	(Sweden) SWE	Joel Mumbongo	11	1	0+8	0	0	0	1+1	1	0+1	0
20	FW	(Scotland) SCO	Joe McGlynn	15	5	2+8	3	0+4	2	0	0	0+1	0
21	MF	(Scotland) SCO	Dylan Tait	25	1	12+5	1	4	0	1+2	0	1	0
23	DF	(Scotland) SCO	Chris McGinn	3	0	0+1	0	0+1	0	0+1	0	0	0
26	DF	(Scotland) SCO	Cian Newbury	4	0	1+1	0	0	0	1	0	1	0

== Team statistics ==
=== League table ===
Pos	Team	Pld	W	D	L	GF	GA	GD	Pts	Promotion, qualification or relegation
1	Falkirk (C, P)	36	27	9	0	96	28	+68	90	Promotion to the Championship
2	Hamilton Academical (O, P)	36	22	8	6	73	28	+45	74	Qualification for the Championship play-offs
3	Alloa Athletic	36	16	8	12	60	55	+5	56	Qualification for the Championship play-offs
4	Montrose	36	15	8	13	58	57	+1	53	Qualification for the Championship play-offs
5	Cove Rangers	36	14	7	15	58	63	−5	49	

Rules for classification: 1) Points; 2) Goal difference; 3) Goals scored; 4) Head-to-to head points; 5) Head-to-head goal difference; 6) Play-off (only for deciding promotion, play-off participation and relegation).
(C) Champions; (O) Play-off winners; (P) Promoted

=== League Cup table ===
Pos	Team	Pld	W	PW	PL	L	GF	GA	GD	Pts	Qualification	LIV	HAM	COV	BRE	CLY
1	Livingston	4	3	0	1	0	10	1	+9	10	Qualification for the second round	—	1–1p	—	—	1–0
2	Hamilton Academical	4	2	1	1	0	7	4	+3	9		—	—	2–2p	1–0	—
3	Cove Rangers	4	2	1	0	1	10	11	−1	8		0–5	—	—	—	5–2
4	Brechin City	4	1	0	0	3	4	8	−4	3		0–3	—	2–3	—	—
5	Clyde	4	0	0	0	4	4	11	−7	0		—	1–3	—	1–2	—

Rules for classification: 1) goal difference, 2) goals scored, 3) away goals scored, 4) matches won, 5) away matches won, 6) drawing of lots.

== Transfers ==
=== Players in ===
Player	From	Fee
(Scotland) Lee Kilday	(Scotland) Queen's Park	Free
(Scotland) Jackson Longridge	(Scotland) Livingston	Free
(Scotland) Kyle MacDonald	(Scotland) Dunfermline Athletic	Free
(Scotland) Kevin O'Hara	(Scotland) Dunfermline Athletic	Free
(Scotland) Jamie Barjonas	(Scotland) Kelty Hearts	Free
(Scotland) Euan Henderson	(Scotland) Heart of Midlothian	Free
(Scotland) Stephen Hendrie	(Scotland) Queen of the South	Free
(Scotland) Joe McGlynn	(England) Burnley	Free
(Scotland) Connor Murray	(Scotland) Queen of the South	Free
(Scotland) Michael Hewitt	(Scotland) Ayr United	Free
(Republic of Ireland) Josh O'Brien	(England) Salford City	Free
(Australia) Dylan McGowan	(Scotland) Kilmarnock	Free
(Sweden) Joel Mumbongo	(England) Tranmere Rovers	Free
(Scotland) Ben Williamson	(Scotland) Rangers	Undisclosed
(England) Dean Lyness	(Republic of Ireland) St Patrick's Athletic	Free

=== Players out ===
Player	To	Fee
(England) Benny Ashley-Seal		Free
(Scotland) Michael Doyle	(Scotland) Cove Rangers	Free
(Scotland) Myles Gaffney	(Scotland) Cove Rangers	Free
(Togo) Steve Lawson	(Tunisia) Stade Tunisien	Free
(Scotland) Adam McGowan	(Scotland) East Kilbride	Free
(England) Jonny Ngandu	(England) Stratford Town	Free
(Republic of Ireland) Daniel O'Reilly	(Scotland) Raith Rovers	Free
(Scotland) Matthew Shiels	(Scotland) Dumbarton	Free
(Scotland) Reegan Mimnaugh	(Scotland) Queen of the South	Free
(Scotland) Lewis Spence	(Scotland) Edinburgh City	Free
(Scotland) Brian Easton	(Scotland) East Fife	Free
(Scotland) Josh McDonald	(England) Leeds United	Undisclosed
(Scotland) Gabriel Forsyth	(England) Norwich City	Undisclosed
(Scotland) Ryan Oné	(England) Sheffield United	Undisclosed
(Scotland) Cormac Daly	(England) Nottingham Forest	Undisclosed
(Republic of Ireland) Josh O'Brien	(United States) Indy Eleven	Free
(Canada) Dario Zanatta	(Canada) Pacific FC	Undisclosed

=== Loans in ===
Player	From	Fee
(Scotland) Dylan Tait	(Scotland) Hibernian	Loan
(Northern Ireland) Makenzie Kirk	(Scotland) Heart of Midlothian	Loan
(Scotland) Jake Hastie	(England) Hartlepool United	Loan
(Scotland) Jake Davidson	(Scotland) Inverness CT	Loan
(Jamaica) Ahkeem Rose	(Scotland) Ayr United	Loan

=== Loans out ===
Player	To	Fee
(Scotland) Fergus Owens	(Scotland) Kelty Hearts	Loan
(Scotland) Cian Newbury	(Scotland) Dumbarton	Loan
(Scotland) Chris McGinn	(Scotland) Clyde	Loan
(Sweden) Joel Mumbongo	(Scotland) Queen of the South	Loan
(Scotland) Joe McGlynn	(Scotland) Kelty Hearts	Loan
