= 2023 Scottish Challenge Cup final =

- Event: 2022–23 Scottish Challenge Cup
Raith Rovers	Hamilton Academical
0	1
- Date: 26 March 2023
- Venue: Falkirk Stadium, Falkirk
- Referee: Colin Steven
- Attendance: 5,566

The 2023 Scottish Challenge Cup final, also known as the SPFL Trust Trophy final for sponsorship reasons, was a football match that took place on 26 March 2023 between Raith Rovers and Hamilton Academical. It was the 30th final of the Scottish Challenge Cup since it was first organised in 1990 to celebrate the centenary of the now defunct Scottish Football League, and the eighth since the SPFL was formed. It also marked the return of non-Scottish teams to the competition for the first time since the 2019–20 edition.

== Route to the final ==
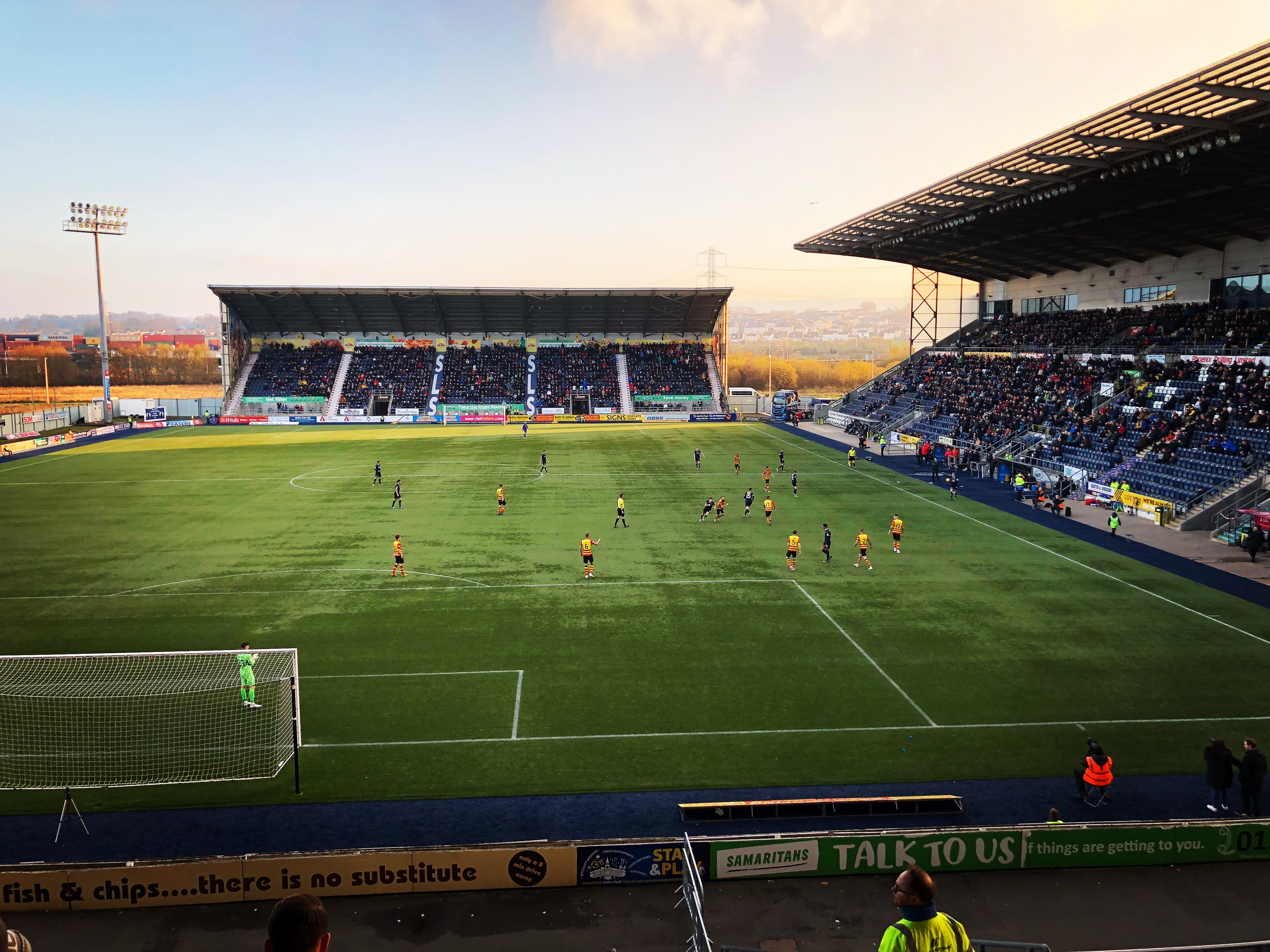
The final took place at the Falkirk Stadium (pictured in 2018)

The competition is a knock-out tournament and was contested by 49 teams from Scotland in 2022–23, as well as 2 teams each from Wales and Northern Ireland respectively.

=== Raith Rovers ===
As a 2021–22 Scottish Championship club, Raith Rovers were given a bye to the third round. The 2023 final was Raith's fourth Challenge Cup final and third consecutive final, having split the 2020 edition with Inverness Caledonian Thistle after the final was postponed indefinitely due to the COVID-19 pandemic, and were reigning champions after winning the 2022 edition against Queen of the South. They also won the 2014 final against Rangers, making them undefeated in all four finals they had been involved in prior.

Round	Opposition	Score
Third round	Cove Rangers (a)	1–0
Fourth round	Greenock Morton (h)	1–1 (a.e.t.); 4–2 (p)
Quarter-final	Queen's Park (a)	1–0
Semi-final	Dundee (a)	2–2 (a.e.t.); 4–3 (p)

=== Hamilton Academical ===
As a 2021–22 Scottish Championship club, Hamilton Academical were given a bye to the third round. This was Hamilton's first Challenge Cup final since the 2012 edition. The 2023 final was Hamilton's fifth Challenge Cup final, having won the cup in 1991 and 1992, and finishing as runners-up in 2005 and 2012.

Round	Opposition	Score
Third round	Rangers B (a)	3–0
Fourth round	Inverness Caledonian Thistle (h)	2–0
Quarter-final	Clyde (h)	3–2
Semi-final	Queen of the South (h)	2–1 (a.e.t.)

== Match details ==
26 March 2023
16:15 GMT
Final

Raith Rovers	0–1	Hamilton Academical
	Report	Tumilty 30'; O'Reilly (red card) 55'

Falkirk Stadium, Falkirk
Attendance: 5,566
Referee: Colin Steven

Raith Rovers	Hamilton Academical

GK	1	(Scotland) Jamie MacDonald
RB	4	(Scotland) Ross Millen
CB	5	(Republic of Ireland) Ryan Nolan (substituted off) 84'
CB	12	(Scotland) Tom Lang (yellow card)
LB	3	(Scotland) Liam Dick
RM	16	(Scotland) Sam Stanton
CM	6	(Scotland) Brad Spencer (substituted off) 76'
CM	20	(Scotland) Scott Brown
LM	23	(Scotland) Dylan Easton
CAM	10	(Scotland) Lewis Vaughan (yellow card)
FW	77	(Guinea-Bissau) Esmaël Gonçalves (substituted off) 55'
Substitutes:
GK	13	(Scotland) Andrew McNeil
GK	17	(Scotland) Robbie Thomson
DF	15	(Malawi) Kieran Ngwenya
DF	30	(Scotland) Adam Masson
MF	7	(Scotland) Aidan Connolly (substituted on) 55'
MF	22	(Scotland) Ethan Ross (substituted on) 76'
FW	11	(Scotland) Connor McBride (substituted on) 84'
Manager:
(Scotland) Ian Murray

- Man of the match: Ryan Fulton (Hamilton Accies)

GK	1	(Scotland) Ryan Fulton
CB	4	(Republic of Ireland) Daniel O'Reilly (red card) 55'
CB	15	(Australia) Dylan McGowan
CB	3	(Scotland) Matthew Shiels (substituted off) 45'
RWB	22	(Scotland) Reghan Tumilty
CM	14	(Scotland) Marley Redfern (substituted off) 21'
CM	18	(Scotland) Reegan Mimnaugh
CM	8	(Scotland) Scott Martin
LWB	11	(Scotland) Lewis Smith (substituted off) 57'
CAM	23	(Scotland) Lucas De Bolle
FW	9	(England) Benny Ashley-Seal (substituted off) 10'
Substitutes:
GK	31	(Scotland) Jamie Smith
DF	5	(Scotland) Brian Easton (substituted on) 57'
DF	12	(Wales) Tom Sparrow (substituted on) 21'
DF	25	(Scotland) Fergus Owens
DF	37	(Scotland) Chris McGinn
FW	10	(Canada) Dario Zanatta (substituted on) 45'
FW	16	(England) Dylan Stephenson
FW	17	(France) Jean-Pierre Tiéhi (substituted on) 10'
FW	19	(Scotland) Andy Winter
Manager:
(Scotland) John Rankin

Match rules

- 90 minutes.
- 30 minutes of extra-time if necessary.
- Penalty shoot-out if scores still level.
