= Hamilton Academical F.C. Reserves and Academy =

Hamilton Academical Reserves
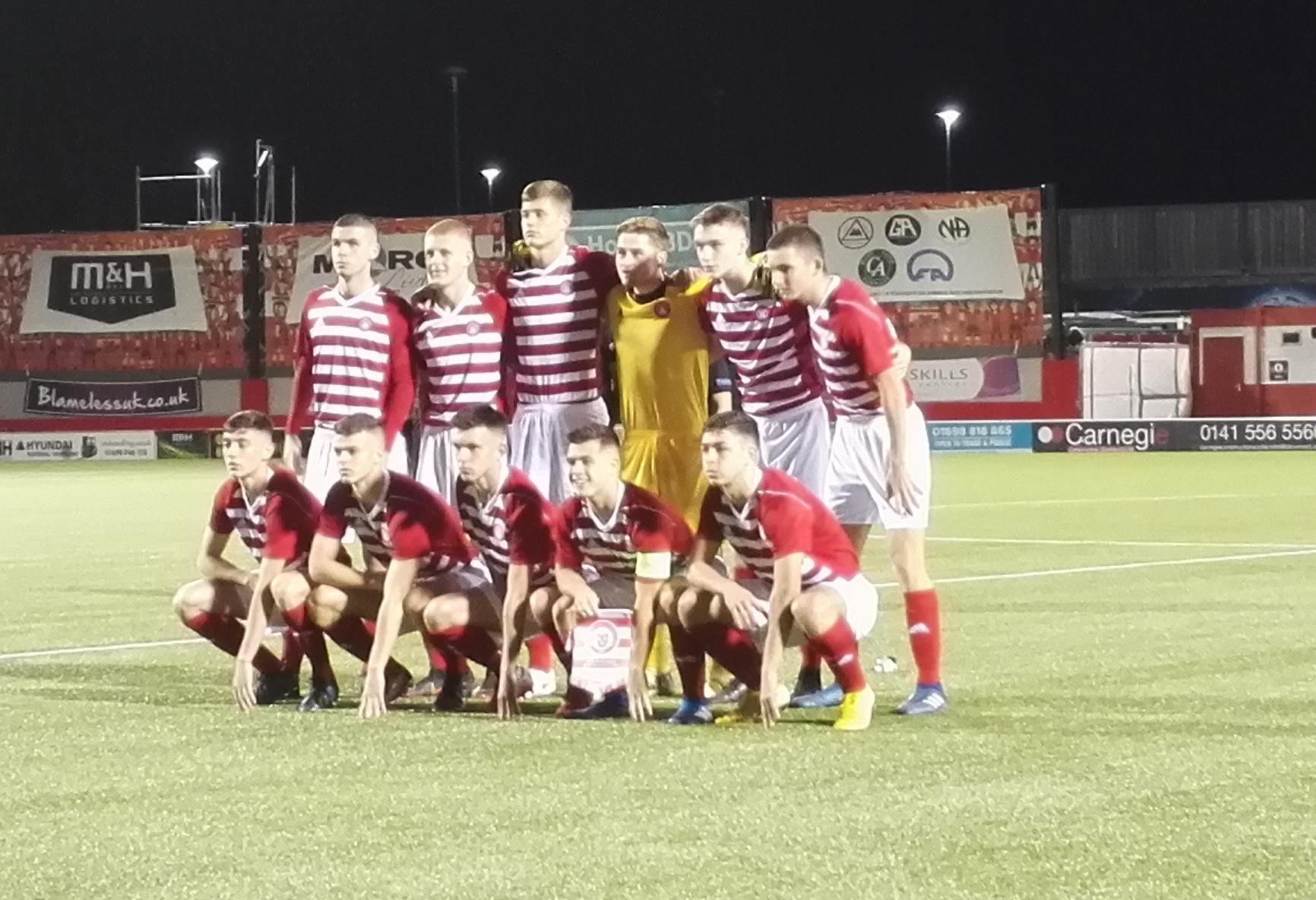
- Hamilton Under-19s in the UEFA Youth League, 2018
- Ground: New Douglas Park; Hamilton
- Academy Director: Scott Leitch
- League: SPFL Reserve League
- Website: www.hamiltonacciesfc.co.uk
Home colours	Away colours

In addition to their first team competing in Scottish League One, Hamilton Academical F.C. also maintain a reserve team competing in the SPFL Reserve League. A reserve team was fielded for many years until the abandonment of the most recent league for those teams in 2009. An under-20 side took part in the SPFL Development League until it was disbanded in 2018.

The club has also maintained a youth academy for younger age groups, with teams playing in competitions such as the Scottish Challenge Cup and the Scottish Youth Cup; as of 2025, that structure is in hiatus as a consequence of a range of issues affecting the wider club.

== Academy history ==
=== 2000s ===
In May 2003, Glasgow businessman Ronnie MacDonald bought a controlling interest in Hamilton Academical for a nominal fee, having previously been at the helm of Maryhill Juniors, then Clyde – a club of comparable stature to Hamilton but competing in the division above. Accies had recently escaped from Scotland's bottom tier after a financial crisis and, having shared grounds with other clubs since 1994, had moved to their new stadium in 2001. With a small fanbase and few other sources of revenue, MacDonald and his associates recognised that his new club's best chances of success would be through engaging with the local community and unearthing players at little cost, primarily through their youth system, with the players then sold on for a profit if their talents outgrew the surroundings. Though practiced to some extent by most clubs, this business model became Hamilton's primary focus from then on; MacDonald soon appointed Allan Maitland, whom he had worked with at Clyde and other clubs at various levels, as head coach and recruited several coaches and other staff directly from his former club, including Les Gray who would play an important role at the club in the coming years.

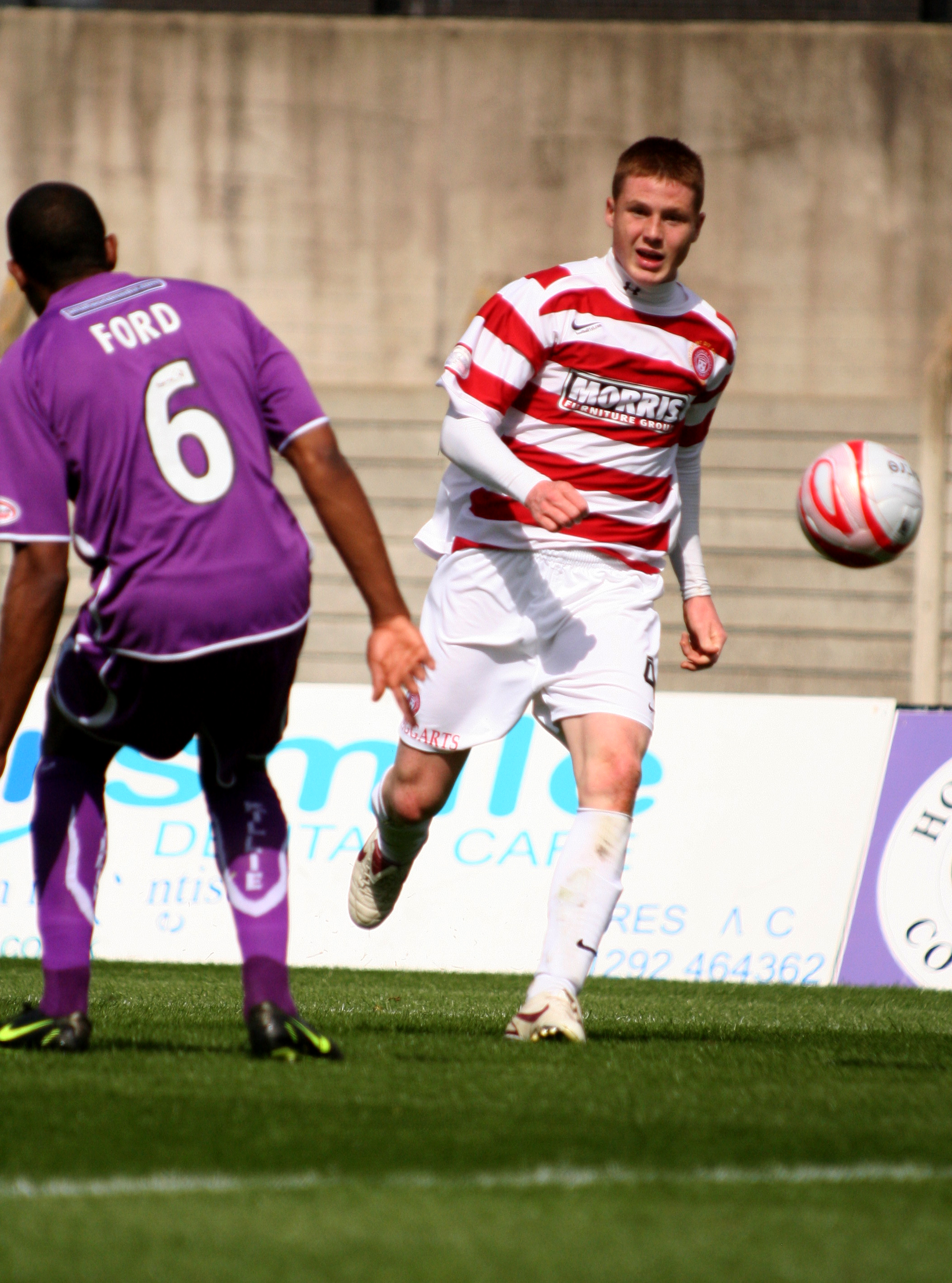
James McCarthy is perhaps Hamilton's most famous youth product of the 21st century and one of the club's youngest players

After quickly gaining promotion to the First Division and consolidating their place under Maitland, in 2005 Hamilton brought in Billy Reid from Clyde to be the next manager, with MacDonald and other staff also previously having worked with him in that club's youth system. Working within a small budget, Reid successfully built a squad mixed with experienced professionals and promising teenagers, and steered them to the top division by winning the 2007–08 Scottish First Division title. The two most prominent young players, James McCarthy and James McArthur subsequently both signed for Wigan Athletic in England, where they won the 2013 FA Cup Final before moving on again for bigger fees, earning Hamilton a further windfall due to sell-on fees in the original transfers, with the money received being re-invested into the youth academy programme.

=== 2010s ===
Relegation occurred in 2011 and Reid departed two years later; his successor Alex Neil, the club captain who spent a period as youth coach then player-manager, put together another team featuring several more academy products which won promotion again in 2014, via the play-offs. After Accies briefly topped the Premiership table during the next campaign, Neil left the club to manage in England (along with Frankie McAvoy whose involvement in developing the youth system had also been significant) and it was again the captain to whom the club turned to take over as player-manager, with the new boss Martin Canning also fully aware of the club's desire to focus on youth development. Under his charge, the club managed to survive four seasons at the elite level (the longest such sequence since World War II, winning a relegation play-off in 2017 thanks to a goal by academy graduate Greg Docherty) despite blooding more inexperienced youngsters, many of whom were soon acquired by richer competitors and in turn were replaced by the next set of youth graduates. Despite the Hamilton players being exposed to high level football at a young age, they were rarely selected for national age group squads, with the players involved suggesting they may have been overlooked due to the stature of the club they played for.

In 2017, the Hamilton academy was one of eight across the country designated 'elite' status on the introduction of Project Brave, an SFA initiative to concentrate the development of the best young players at a smaller number of clubs with high quality facilities and coaching than was previously the case.

The 2017–18 season was challenging off the field for the club as they lost most of their funds in a high-value fraud, a large proportion of which had been earmarked for improvements to the youth academy. The also had to invest a significant sum in a new artificial playing surface after the existing one was voted the worst in Scotland, had to cope with the death of serving community coach and former youth player Matthew Craig, and suffered an arson attack on their stadium. However, by the end of the campaign they secured a new club sponsor (after the previous firm ceased trading), and maintained their place in the Premiership, while the Under-17 side – coached by first-team regulars Dougie Imrie and Darian MacKinnon – won the national title with an unbeaten record to qualify for the 2018–19 UEFA Youth League, becoming only the second Scottish club to participate in the competition after Celtic who had been Scottish champions at both senior and U17 level in the other relevant years. It would also be the first time that the club had taken part in an official UEFA competition at any level.

Early in 2019, Martin Canning was replaced as head coach by Brian Rice, who had no previous connection with Hamilton but a strong background in coaching young players. Accies again survived to remain in the Premiership, and at the start of the following season Rice reiterated his intention to operate with a youthful squad, including academy graduates when possible. The COVID-19 pandemic in Scotland caused many clubs to release players in the summer of 2020, with Hamilton only retaining seven reserves for the following season and instead organising several loan deals for their fringe players.

=== 2020s ===
Hamilton were eventually relegated from the Premiership in 2021 and then dropped down from the Scottish Championship in 2023, both necessitating cost-cutting measures across the club, although the decision was made to remain full-time and maintain funding for the youth academy. In May 2024, Accies selected an entirely home-grown starting XI for a Scottish League One fixture against Kelty Hearts, which they won 4–1. A few weeks later, they returned to the Championship via the play-offs.

In the summer of 2024, long-serving academy director George Cairns was replaced by Gordon Young. The season that followed was particularly challenging for the club as a whole due to ongoing financial issues between the former and incumbent ownerships, culminating in a points deduction from the SPFL due to missed payments (leading to relegation), a transfer embargo and temporary relocation to Cumbernauld. In the wake of this, the club announced Scott Leitch as academy director, leading a coaching team including Michael Tidser, Kevin Harper and Darryl Duffy, but stated it was pausing the youth academy for lower age groups (11-to 15-year-olds). It was soon confirmed that due to the cancellation of part of the structure, as well as being "unable to provide assurances to the Licencing Committee in eight different key areas, including facilities, coaching qualifications and Child Wellbeing and Protection standards", Hamilton would lose its Elite status in the Club Academy Scotland system, preventing them from fielding under-17 or under-19 teams for that season at least, with all youth players free to join other clubs.

== Competitions ==
In the early 1950s, reserve teams were incorporated into the third tier of the senior Scottish Football League, with Hamilton 'A' taking part for four seasons of the arrangement. Accies also fielded a team for many years in various separate reserve competitions, culminating in the Scottish Premier Reserve League which was abandoned in 2009.

Prior to the introduction of the Scottish Premier League in 1998, the Under-20s previously competed in the youth league administered by the Scottish Football League.

For the 2016–17 edition of the Scottish Challenge Cup, Under-20 teams of Premiership clubs were granted entry to compete against adult teams for the first time in the modern era. That season, Hamilton Under-20s defeated Cumbernauld Colts of the Lowland League before losing to Albion Rovers. In the 2017–18 edition, they defeated their first SPFL senior opposition – Edinburgh City – in the first round but were elimated by Cove Rangers (Highland League) in the next. As Hamilton Under-21s, they defeated Clyde 4–1 in the 2018–19 competition's opening round before losing 3–2 to their counterparts from St Mirren in the next. The senior team was relegated from the Premiership in 2020–21, meaning they and not an under-age team would take part in the Challenge Cup in future seasons.

In July 2018, it was reported that reserve leagues would be reintroduced in lieu of the development leagues that had been in place since 2009. The top tier of the new SPFL Reserve League featured 18 clubs, whilst a second-tier reserve League comprised nine clubs. Other than a minimum age of 16, no age restrictions applied to the leagues. At the end of its first season (2018–19) several clubs intimated that they would withdraw from the Reserve League to play a variety of challenge matches, but Hamilton were one of those who chose to remain. The reserve team were awarded the 2019–20 SPFL Reserve League title, albeit only after the competition was halted early due to the COVID-19 pandemic.

=== UEFA Youth League 2018 ===
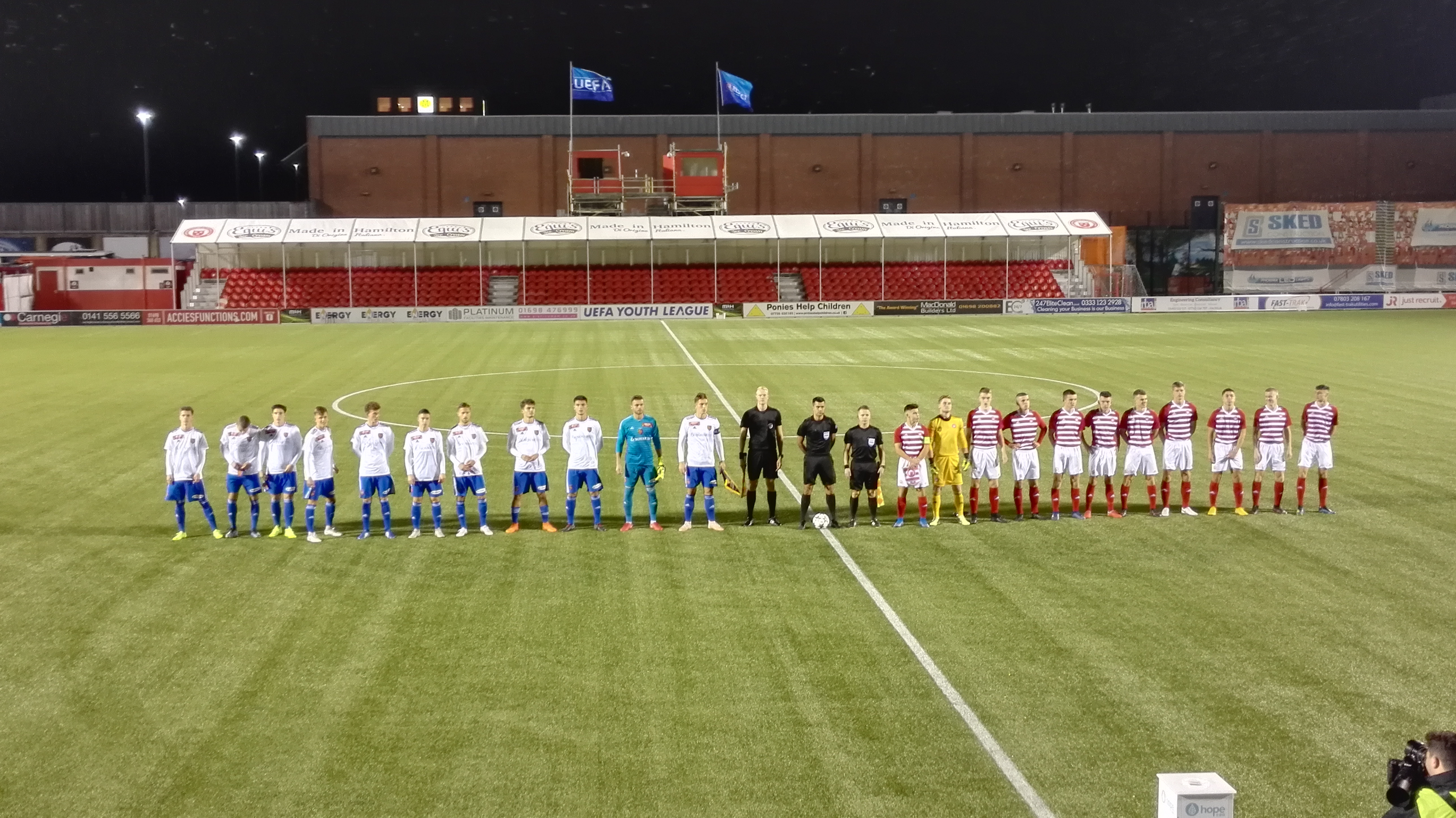
Hamilton and FC Basel Under-19 teams line up prior to their UEFA Youth League match, October 2018

From 2015 onwards it has been possible for the Hamilton academy to participate in the UEFA Youth League by the Under-17 side winning the previous season's league at that age group; they first achieved this in 2018.

In the opening round of the UEFA Youth League's 'Domestic Champions Path', Hamilton were drawn against FC Basel of Switzerland, a club with a list of youth alumni including FIFA World Cup participants Alexander Frei, Hakan Yakin, Xherdan Shaqiri, Ivan Rakitić, Granit Xhaka, Zdravko Kuzmanović and Gökhan Inler. Both the first leg in Switzerland and the return in the Scotland finished 2–2, with Accies levelling the scores in the second leg with the last kick of the match. In the resulting shootout, goalkeeper Ross Connelly – who had been at fault for both Basel goals on the night – saved two kicks and Hamilton won 3–2.

In the second round, the opponents were Denmark's FC Midtjylland Academy which produced Simon Kjær, Winston Reid, Jonas Lössl and Erik Sviatchenko, and whose senior team were the reigning national champions. Midtjylland secured a 2–0 victory in the first leg in Herning with both goals from Casper Tengstedt. In the return in Scotland, watched by a crowd of over 2,000 as in the previous round, Hamilton took the lead through Andrew Winter suggesting the possibility of a comeback, but then conceded an equaliser and away goal in the second half via a penalty converted by Tengstedt. With the tie slipping away, a red card for an Accies player borne of frustration and a late second Midtjylland goal sealed a 4–1 aggregate victory for the Danes.

=== UEFA Youth League 2023 ===
While the senior team was relegated to the third tier in the 2022–23 season, Hamilton were winners of the SPFL Under-18 league, granting entry to the UEFA Youth League for a second time in 2023–24. Drawn against Norwegians Molde, a 3–0 defeat in the first leg, plus the factors of the opposition having an older, more experienced team in contrast to Accies who had lost four key members of their squad from their squad to English clubs (Ryan One to Sheffield United, Gabriel Forsyth to Norwich City, Josh McDonald to Leeds United and Cormac Daly to Nottingham Forest) left little room for optimism ahead of the second leg. Their exit appeared to be confirmed when Molde went ahead at New Douglas Park, but three goals from Ben Black (two penalties) and one from Paddy Meechan within the next hour brought the aggregate score level. Molde managed to find another goal through Andreas Myklebust and held out for a 4–2 defeat on the night but a 5–4 win over two legs.

== Facilities and staff ==
Hamilton are the only professional club in the South Lanarkshire region (population around 300,000), and the town's proximity to North Lanarkshire and Greater Glasgow makes it feasible for Accies to scout for young talent throughout these areas which are home to over one million; however it also means that they are competing not only with clubs of similar stature like St Mirren, Partick Thistle and local rivals Motherwell, but also national heavyweights Rangers and Celtic.

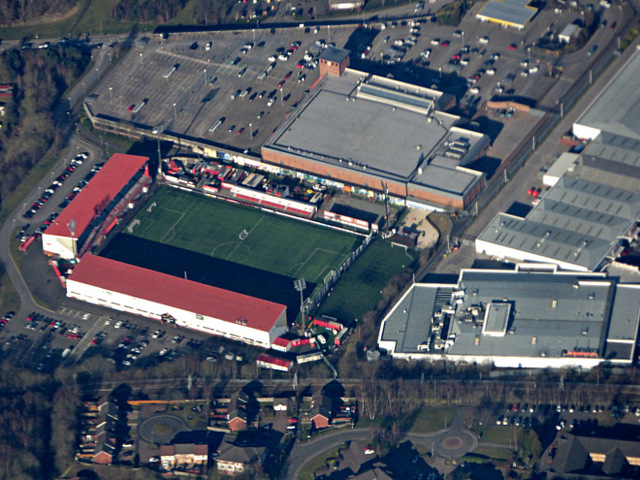
The artificial surfaces which have been installed at New Douglas Park during much of its history allow the club's training sessions and youth fixtures to take place there, in addition to senior team matches

Hamilton's main appeal to potential signings is the emphasis they place on developing players from within, and the likelihood that those coming through will be more likely to be given opportunities to prove themselves than elsewhere, as evidenced in both the 2016–17 and 2017–18 season when analysis by the CIES Football Observatory showed they were the leading club in the Scottish Premiership in terms of minutes on the field by homegrown players (Celtic also scored well, although the majority of their contributions came from three regulars who are in the Scottish national squad – Tierney, Forrest and McGregor – rather than untried youngsters being thrown in). In the 2017 study, Hamilton were 53rd across Europe for providing opportunities to youngsters, and the only British club to break into the top 100.

The club aim to maximise use of their facilities at New Douglas Park, with the artificial surface not subject to the same wear as a grass pitch; it is therefore used by the senior and youth teams for both training and matches whenever possible. There are also other venues in the local area which can be hired when necessary, such as Bothwellhaugh (Strathclyde Park) and Hamilton Palace Sports Grounds.

== Reserve/Development squad ==
Note: Some players on the list may either have made first team appearances for Accies (those named in the senior list have allocated squad numbers), or have been loaned to other SPFL clubs; however they can still be selected for Reserve League fixtures with their parent club whenever available to play.

Note: Due to the effects of the COVID-19 pandemic, the club had yet to announce a reserve squad for 2020–21 in October 2020, with a likelihood that no team would be formed for that season.

== Former reserve/youth team players ==
This list focuses on the players who have graduated through Hamilton's academy, and have made at least 50 first team appearances or other notable achievements, since the inception of the SPL in 1998. Some of the club's earlier notable players also came through the youth setup, including three of the longest servants Rikki Ferguson, Stan Anderson and Jamie Fairlie, as well as John Brown who won 14 trophies at Rangers and Paul Hartley who appeared 25 times for Scotland.

Players currently at Hamilton in bold.

As of August 2025

- Paul McLeod (2004)
- James McArthur (2005)
- Tony Stevenson (2005)
- James Gibson (2006)
- Brian Easton (2006)
- James McCarthy (2006)
- Ali Crawford (2009)
- Grant Gillespie (2009)
- **Lee Kilday** (2011)
- Ziggy Gordon (2011)
- **Stephen Hendrie** (2011)
- Andy Ryan (2011)
- Mikey Devlin (2011)
- Eamonn Brophy (2012)
- Scott McMann (2012)
- Greg Docherty (2014)
- Darren Lyon (2014)
- Steven Boyd (2015)
- Danny Armstrong (2015)
- Lewis Ferguson (2017)
- Shaun Want (2017)
- Lewis Smith (2019)
- Jamie Hamilton (2019)
- Reegan Mimnaugh (2019)
- Andy Winter (2019)
- George Stanger (2019)
- Gabriel Forsyth (2022)
- Ryan Oné (2022)

== Honours ==
Reserves

- Scottish 2nd XI Cup: 1933–34
- Scottish Reserve League (West): 1978–79, 1979–80, 1997–98
- Scottish Reserve League Cup: 1983–84, 2011–12
- SPFL Reserve League: 2019–20

Youth

- SPFL Development League: (Note: Youth league running since 1993. Previously known as the Scottish Football League Youth Division, Scottish Premier under-18/under-19/under-20 League and SPFL under-20 League) Runners-up 2015–16, 2016–17
- SPFL Under-17 League: Winners 2017–18, 2022–23
- SFL Under-19 League Cup: Winners 2012–13
- SFL Under-17 League Cup: Winners 2003–04
- SAFA Under-18 Cup: Winners 1991–92
