= Tom Sparrow (Welsh footballer) =

Welsh footballer

Personal information
- Full name: Thomas Lance Sparrow
- Date of birth: 6 December 2002 (age 23)
- Place of birth: Buckley, Flintshire, Wales
- Height: 6 ft 0 in (1.84 m)
- Position: Midfielder

Team information
- Current team: Motherwell
- Number: 7

Youth career
- 2015–2017: Wolverhampton Wanderers
- 2017–2022: Stoke City

Senior career*
Years	Team	Apps	(Gls)
2022–2024	Stoke City	3	(0)
2021	→ AFC Telford United (loan)	6	(0)
2023	→ Hamilton Academical (loan)	12	(0)
2023–2024	→ Chester (loan)	8	(0)
2024–	Motherwell	60	(6)

International career^{‡}
2018	Wales U17	3	(0)
2022–2023	Wales U21	2	(0)
- * Club domestic league appearances and goals as of 20 May 2026 ‡ National team caps and goals as of 17:20, 27 September 2022 (UTC)

Thomas Lance Sparrow (born 6 December 2002) is a Welsh professional footballer who plays as a midfielder for Scottish Premiership club Motherwell and the Wales under-21 national team.

== Club career ==
=== Stoke City ===
Sparrow joined Stoke City from Wolverhampton Wanderers as a 14-year old. In October 2021 Sparrow joined National League North side AFC Telford United on a one-month youth loan. Sparrow made his professional debut on 7 May 2022 in a 1–1 draw against Coventry City.

On 7 January 2023, Sparrow joined Scottish Championship side Hamilton Academical on loan for the remainder of the 2022–23 season, making his debut the same day in a 1–0 defeat away at Ayr United. He helped Hamilton win the Scottish Challenge Cup after they beat Raith Rovers 1–0 in the final. Sparrow made 17 appearances for Accies as they suffered relegation after losing on penalties to Airdrieonians in the playoffs. On 5 September 2023, Sparrow joined National League North side Chester on a three-month loan. Sparrow made twelve appearances for Chester before returning to Stoke in January 2024. He was released by Stoke at the end of the 2023–24 season.

=== Motherwell ===
Sparrow signed a two-year contract with Scottish Premiership club Motherwell on 12 June 2024. On 2 April 2025, Motherwell announced that they had signed a new contract with Sparrow, until the summer of 2027 with the club holding a one-year extension option.

== International career ==
In September 2022 Sparrow made his debut for the Wales national under-21 football team in a 2–0 friendly match defeat against Austria under-21.

== Career statistics ==
As of match played 23 July 2026

Appearances and goals by club, season and competition
Club	Season	League			National Cup		League Cup		Continental		Other		Total	
Club	Season	Division	Apps	Goals	Apps	Goals	Apps	Goals	Apps	Goals	Apps	Goals	Apps	Goals
Stoke City	2021–22	Championship	1	0	0	0	0	0	—		—		1	0
Stoke City	2022–23	Championship	2	0	0	0	1	0	—		—		3	0
Stoke City	2023–24	Championship	0	0	0	0	0	0	—		—		0	0
Stoke City	Total		3	0	0	0	1	0	—		—		4	0
AFC Telford United (loan)	2021–22	National League North	6	0	0	0	—		—		—		6	0
Hamilton Academical (loan)	2022–23	Scottish Championship	12	0	1	0	0	0	—		4 (Note: Two appearances in Scottish Challenge Cup and two in Scottish Championship relegation play-offs)	0	17	0
Chester (loan)	2023–24	National League North	8	0	3	0	—		—		1 (Note: Appearance(s) in FA Trophy)	0	12	0
Motherwell	2024–25	Scottish Premiership	32	6	1	0	4	0	—		—		37	6
Motherwell	2025–26	Scottish Premiership	28	0	2	0	6	0	—		—		36	0
Motherwell	2026–27	Scottish Premiership	0	0	0	0	0	0	1 (Note: Appearance(s) in UEFA Conference League)	0	—		1	0
Motherwell	Total		60	6	3	0	10	0	1	0	—		74	6
Career total			89	6	7	0	11	0	1	0	5	0	113	6

== Honours ==
Hamilton Academical

- Scottish Challenge Cup: 2022–23
