= Tiéhi =

Tiéhi is an African surname. Notable people with the surname include:

- Christ Tiéhi (born 1998), Ivorian footballer
- Jean-Pierre Tiéhi (born 2002), French footballer
- Joël Tiéhi (born 1964), Ivorian footballer
