= Andy Winter (footballer) =

Scottish footballer

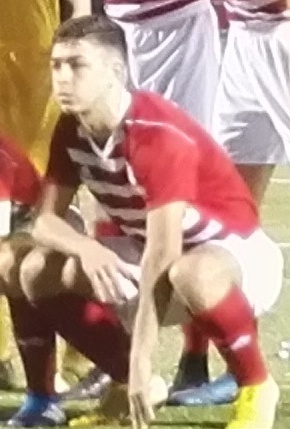
- Winter with Hamilton U19s in 2018

Personal information
- Date of birth: 10 March 2002 (age 24)
- Place of birth: Wishaw, Scotland
- Height: 1.70 m (5 ft 7 in)
- Position: Forward

Team information
- Current team: Arbroath

Youth career
- 2012–2019: Hamilton Academical

Senior career*
Years	Team	Apps	(Gls)
2019–2024	Hamilton Academical	91	(8)
2024–2026	Livingston	26	(1)
2025	→ Arbroath (loan)	16	(6)
2026	→ Raith Rovers (loan)	13	(0)
2026–	Arbroath	0	(0)

International career^{‡}
2017–2018	Scotland U16	10	(3)
2018–2019	Scotland U17	10	(2)
2019	Scotland U18	1	(0)
- * Club domestic league appearances and goals as of 20:01, 8 July 2026 (UTC) ‡ National team caps and goals as of 17:50, 25 January 2020 (UTC)

Andrew Winter (born 10 March 2002) is a Scottish professional footballer who plays as a forward for Scottish Championship side Arbroath.

== Club career ==
Winter began his career with Hamilton Academical, joining the club aged 10. He played and scored in the UEFA Youth League and the Scottish Challenge Cup with the Accies underage teams before making his senior debut on 18 January 2020, a 5–0 win over Edinburgh City in the 2019–20 Scottish Cup fourth round in which he entered as a substitute and scored the fourth goal. He then made his first Scottish Premiership appearance the following week, again coming off the bench in a 4–2 defeat away to Livingston. His first start soon followed in the Scottish Cup, playing the entirety of a 4–1 home defeat for Hamilton at the hands of Rangers.

Winter was released from Hamilton Academical in May 2024. The following month, he began training with Livingston. He signed a one-year deal with Livi in July 2024.

In January 2025, Winter signed for Arbroath on loan for the remainder of the 2024–25 season. He joined Raith Rovers on loan in January 2026.

He left Livingston in May 2026 following the expiration of his contract, and signed a one-year deal with Arbroath on 5 June.

== International career ==
He has represented Scotland at under-16, under-17 and under-18 youth levels.

== Personal life ==
His father Brian Winter is a former football referee.

== Career statistics ==
As of match played 1 July 2026

Appearances and goals by club, season and competition
Club	Season	League			Scottish Cup		Scottish League Cup		Other		Total	
Club	Season	Division	Apps	Goals	Apps	Goals	Apps	Goals	Apps	Goals	Apps	Goals
Hamilton Academical U20	2019–20	—			—		—		2 (Note: Appearances in Scottish Challenge Cup)	2	2	2
Hamilton Academical	2019–20	Scottish Premiership	3	0	2	1	—		—		5	1
Hamilton Academical	2020–21	Scottish Premiership	22	0	0	0	1	0	—		23	0
Hamilton Academical	2021–22	Scottish Championship	15	4	0	0	0	0	0	0	15	4
Hamilton Academical	2022–23	Scottish Championship	34	4	3	0	4	3	6 (Note: Three appearances in Scottish Challenge Cup; three appearances, three goals in Scottish Championship play-offs)	3	47	10
Hamilton Academical	2023–24	Scottish League One	17	0	0	0	4	2	2 (Note: Appearances in Scottish Championship play-offs)	0	23	2
Hamilton Academical	Total		91	8	5	1	9	5	8	3	113	17
Livingston	2024–25	Scottish Championship	16	1	1	0	3	0	3	0	23	1
Livingston	2025–26	Scottish Premiership	10	0	0	0	5	1	—		15	1
Livingston	Total		26	1	1	0	8	1	3	0	38	2
Arbroath (loan)	2024–25	Scottish League One	16	6	—		—		—		16	6
Raith Rovers (loan)	2025-26	Scottish Championship	13	0	1	0	—		3	0	17	0
Arbroath	2026-27	Scottish Championship	0	0	0	0	0	0	0	0	0	0
Career total			146	15	7	1	17	6	16	5	186	27

== Honours ==
Hamilton Academical

- Scottish Challenge Cup: 2022–23

Arbroath

- Scottish League One: 2024–25

Raith Rovers

- Scottish Challenge Cup: 2025–26
