= Jamie Hamilton (footballer) =

Scottish footballer

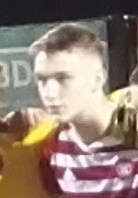
- Hamilton with Hamilton U19s, 2018

Personal information
- Date of birth: 1 March 2002 (age 24)
- Place of birth: Newton Mearns, Scotland
- Height: 1.80 m (5 ft 11 in)
- Position: Defender

Team information
- Current team: East Kilbride
- Number: 4

Youth career
- Hamilton Academical

Senior career*
Years	Team	Apps	(Gls)
2019–2024	Hamilton Academical	69	(2)
2024–2025	Ayr United	0	(0)
2024–2025	→ East Kilbride (loan)	12	(3)
2025–	East Kilbride	33	(2)

International career^{‡}
2017–2018	Scotland U16	4	(1)
2018–2019	Scotland U17	8	(1)
2018–2019	Scotland U18	3	(0)
2018–2019	Scotland U19	5	(1)
- * Club domestic league appearances and goals as of 4 May 2026 ‡ National team caps and goals as of 10:06, 16 October 2019 (UTC)

Jamie Hamilton (born 1 March 2002) is a Scottish professional footballer who plays as a defender for East Kilbride.

== Club career ==
Hamilton began his career with Hamilton Academical. In November 2019 he signed a new contract with Hamilton, until summer 2022. In November 2021 he was hospitalised with chest pains. In March 2022 he spoke about the club's form and play-off ambitions. In April 2022 he was linked with a move away from the club.

In August 2022 he signed a contract extension until 2023, and in September of the same year he expressed his hope to return to first-team action in a month, having been out injured since April with a thigh problem; however, he was still unavailable in March 2023, missing the team's relegation struggles in the 2022–23 Scottish Championship and their progression to the 2023 Scottish Challenge Cup final. By October 2023 he was still unavailable, having had a number of injury setbacks. He completed his first 90-minute, senior level match in two years in April 2024 as Hamilton defeated Alloa Athletic 1–0 in Scottish League One.

Hamilton was released by Hamilton at the end of the 2023–24 season.

Following his release from Hamilton, he joined Ayr United on a short-term contract until January 2025 and was immediately loaned to Scottish Lowland Football League side East Kilbride. He was released by Ayr in January 2025. He then returned to East Kilbride on a permanent deal until the end of the season.

== International career ==
He has represented Scotland at under-16, under-17 and under-18 youth levels. In August 2019 he represented Scotland in the under-19 squad.
