= Dylan Stephenson =

English footballer

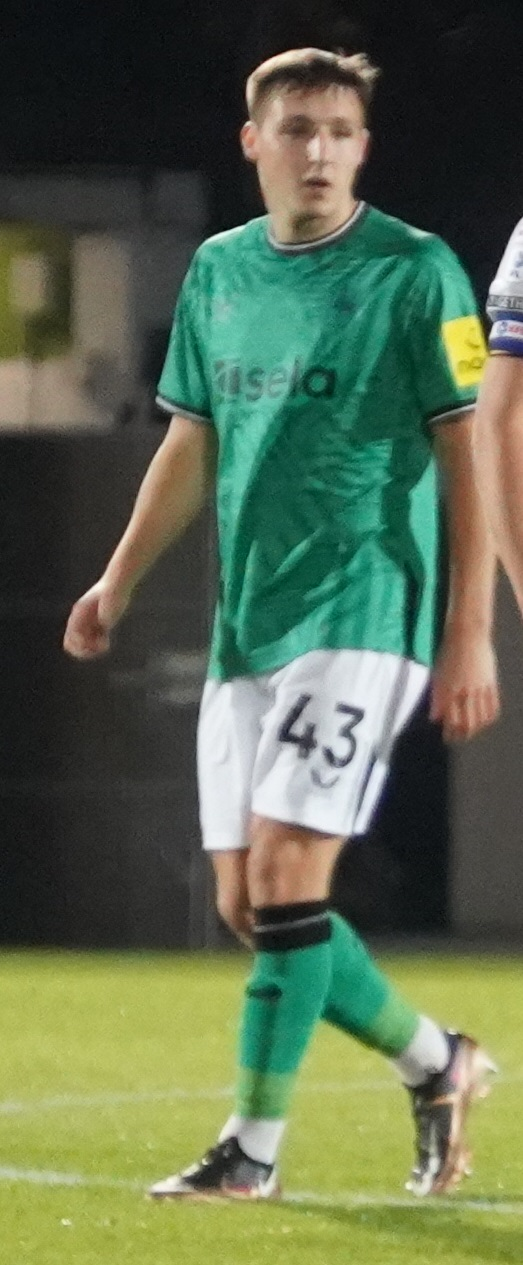
- Stephenson in 2023

Personal information
- Full name: Dylan Jay Stephenson
- Date of birth: 10 December 2002 (age 23)
- Place of birth: Blyth, England
- Height: 1.78 m (5 ft 10 in)
- Positions: Attacking midfielder; right winger

Team information
- Current team: Darlington
- Number: 11

Youth career
- 2017–2021: Newcastle United

Senior career*
Years	Team	Apps	(Gls)
2021–2024	Newcastle United	0	(0)
2023	→ Hamilton Academical (loan)	9	(1)
2024	→ South Shields (loan)	18	(8)
2024–2026	Dagenham & Redbridge	55	(8)
2025	→ South Shields (loan)	15	(0)
2026–	Darlington	0	(0)
- * Club domestic league appearances and goals as of 19:35, 29 June 2026 (UTC)

Dylan Jay Stephenson (born 10 December 2002) is an English professional footballer who plays as an attacking midfielder or right winger for National League North side Darlington.

== Career ==
Born in Blyth, Stephenson joined the Newcastle United academy at fourteen years old. He signed his first professional contract with Newcastle in July 2021. The following summer he agreed a new contract with the club. This came after he 10 goals in 16 appearances in Premier League 2. That summer he had his first taste of first team action playing in a pre-season friendly against Atalanta. He scored in a friendly match for the first team during the club's training camp in Saudi Arabia in December 2022, against Al Hilal SFC.

Stephenson joined Hamilton Academical on a six-month loan deal in January 2023. He scored on his debut for Hamilton, on 28 January 2023, the only goal in a 1–0 away win against Partick Thistle in the Scottish Championship.

On 25 January 2024, it was announced that Stephenson had moved on loan to National League North side South Shields until the end of the season.

Following the conclusion of the 2023–24 season, Newcastle United announced that Stephenson would depart the club upon the expiration of his contract.

=== Dagenham & Redbridge ===
On 10 June 2024, Stephenson agreed to join National League side Dagenham & Redbridge on a two-year deal.

On 3 February 2025, he returned to National League North side South Shields on loan for the remainder of the season.

=== Darlington ===
On 29 June 2026, Stephenson signed a one-year deal with National League North side Darlington.

== Career statistics ==
As of match played 25 April 2026

Appearances and goals by club, season and competition
Club	Season	League			National Cup (Note: Includes Scottish Cup)		League Cup		Other		Total	
Club	Season	Division	Apps	Goals	Apps	Goals	Apps	Goals	Apps	Goals	Apps	Goals
Newcastle United U21	2019–20	—			—		—		1 (Note: Appearances in EFL Trophy)	0	1	0
Newcastle United U21	2020–21	—			—		—		2	0	2	0
Newcastle United U21	2021–22	—			—		—		3	1	3	1
Newcastle United U21	2022–23	—			—		—		2	0	2	0
Newcastle United U21	2023–24	—			—		—		3	0	3	0
Newcastle United U21	Total		—		—		—		11	1	11	1
Hamilton Academical (loan)	2022–23	Scottish Championship	9	1	1	0	—		2 (Note: One appearance in Scottish Challenge Cup, one in Scottish Championship play-offs)	0	12	1
South Shields (loan)	2023–24	National League North	18	8	—		—		—		18	8
Dagenham & Redbridge	2024–25	National League	14	2	2	0	—		5 (Note: One appearance in FA Trophy, four appearances and one goal in National League Cup)	1	21	3
Dagenham & Redbridge	2025–26	National League South	41	6	3	0	—		3 (Note: Appearances in FA Trophy)	1	47	7
Dagenham & Redbridge	Total		55	8	5	0	—		8	2	68	10
South Shields (loan)	2024–25	National League North	15	0	—		—		—		15	0
Career total			97	17	6	0	—		21	3	124	20
