= Rikki Ferguson =

Scottish footballer

Personal information
- Date of birth: 8 August 1956 (age 70)
- Place of birth: Kilmarnock, Scotland
- Position: Goalkeeper

Youth career
- Bellfield

Senior career*
Years	Team	Apps	(Gls)
1974–1988	Hamilton Academical	452	(0)
1987	→ Greenock Morton (loan)	1	(0)
1987	→ Partick Thistle (loan)	1	(0)
1988–1989	Queen of the South	28	(0)

International career
1977	Scotland U21	1	(0)
- * Club domestic league appearances and goals

Rikki Ferguson (born 8 August 1956) is a Scottish former professional footballer who played for most of his career at Hamilton Academical, playing as a goalkeeper. He also had short spells at Bellfield, Greenock Morton, Partick Thistle and Queen of the South.
