= Lucas De Bolle =

Scottish association football player (born 2002)

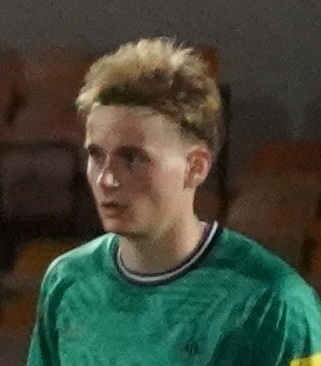
- De Bolle in 2023

Personal information
- Full name: Lucas de Bolle
- Date of birth: 22 October 2002 (age 24)
- Place of birth: Edinburgh, Scotland
- Height: 1.89 m (6 ft 2 in)
- Position: Midfielder

Team information
- Current team: Portimonense

Youth career
- 2015–2021: Newcastle United

Senior career*
Years	Team	Apps	(Gls)
2021–2024	Newcastle United	0	(0)
2022–2023	→ Hamilton Academical (loan)	17	(1)
2024–2025	South Shields	9	(1)
2025–	Portimonense	3	(0)

International career
2022–	Scotland U21	2	(0)
- * Club domestic league appearances and goals as of 13:05, 27 May 2026 (UTC)

Lucas De Bolle (born 22 October 2002) is a Scottish professional footballer who plays as a midfielder for Liga Portugal 2 club Portimonense.

== Early life ==
The son of a Belgian father and an English mother, De Bolle is eligible to play for England, Scotland and Belgium. Initially a product of Wallsend Boys Club he then joined Newcastle United in 2015. De Bolle played at Newcastle United for 9 years, including a loan spell and appearances for Scotland U21s. He made his Newcastle United debut in July 2022.

== Club career ==
=== Newcastle United ===
De Bolle appeared on the substitutes bench of four Premier League games for Newcastle United during the 2021–22 season. De Bolle made his Newcastle United debut in July 2022 in a preseason game against Spanish side Athletic Club. He signed a new two-year contract with Newcastle in the summer of 2022 before heading on loan. De Bolle made his debut for Scotland U21s in 2022, coming off the bench and on full debut De Bolle assisted in a draw Vs Northern Ireland. De Bolle also appeared on the bench in a Champions League group match Vs Borussia Dortmund in the 23/24 season.

==== Hamilton Academical (loan) ====
De Bolle joined Hamilton Academical on loan on 1 September 2022. He made his Scottish Championship debut against Queen's Park. He made his first start for Hamilton in a 2–0 win over Inverness Caledonian Thistle on 10 December 2022 in the 2022–23 Scottish Challenge Cup, producing the cross that led to the first goal. He scored his first senior goal in 2023 in a 3-0 league win for Hamilton against Inverness Caledonian Thistle. He also was part of the team that made it to the final of the Scottish Challenge Cup. Hamilton won the final and De Bolle played 90 minutes. This was Hamilton Academical's first trophy win in 30 years.

=== South Shields ===
On 1 November 2024, De Bolle joined National League North side South Shields.

=== Portimonense ===
On 12 July 2025, De Bolle joined Liga Portugal 2 club Portimonense on a three-year deal having trained with the club's under-23 side the previous season.

== International career ==
De Bolle was called up to the Scotland national under-21 football team twice. First in the 2021/22 season and then again in the 2022/23 season. De Bolle made his start for Scotland U21 in September 2022 against Northern Ireland, where he provided the assist for the first goal.
