= Steve Lawson (footballer) =

Footballer (born 1994)

Personal information
- Full name: Tevi Steve Josue Lawson
- Date of birth: 8 August 1994 (age 32)
- Place of birth: Levallois-Perret, France
- Height: 1.79 m (5 ft 10 in)
- Position: Central midfielder

Team information
- Current team: Sūduva
- Number: 8

Senior career*
Years	Team	Apps	(Gls)
2012–2014	Vannes	24	(0)
2014–2015	Saint-Colomban Locminé	13	(1)
2015–2016	Evian II	21	(0)
2016–2017	Le Mont	17	(0)
2017–2018	Neuchâtel Xamax	21	(1)
2018–2021	Livingston	59	(1)
2022–2023	Hamilton Academical	11	(0)
2023	Stade Tunisien	3	(0)
2024–	Sūduva	80	(10)

International career^{‡}
2017–2020	Togo	20	(0)
- * Club domestic league appearances and goals as of 21 Juny 2026 ‡ National team caps and goals as of 26 May 2025

Tevi Steve Josue Lawson (born 8 August 1994) is a professional footballer who plays as a midfielder for Lithuanian club Sūduva. Born in France, he played for the Togo national team.

== Club career ==
Lawson began his career in the lower divisions of France, before moving to Switzerland with Le Mont. After Le Mont's bankruptcy, Lawson moved to Neuchâtel Xamax in July 2017. After a trial spell, Lawson signed for Scottish club Livingston in August 2018. He departed the club in 2021.

On 27 January 2022, Lawson signed for Scottish Championship side Hamilton Academical.

== International career ==
Born in France to Togolese parents, Lawson was called up to the Togo national team in August 2017. He made his debut in a friendly 2–0 win over Niger on 2 September 2017.

== Career statistics ==
As of match played 20 March 2021

Appearances and goals by club, season and competition
Club	Season	League			National cup		League cup		Other		Total	
Club	Season	Division	Apps	Goals	Apps	Goals	Apps	Goals	Apps	Goals	Apps	Goals
Vannes	2012–13	Championnat National	8	0	0	0	0	0	—		8	0
Vannes	2013–14	Championnat National	16	0	1	0	—		—		17	0
Vannes	Total		24	0	1	0	0	0	0	0	25	0
Saint-Colomban Locminé	2014–15	Championnat de France Amateur 2	13	1	0	0	—		—		13	1
Évian TG II	2015–16	Championnat de France Amateur 2	21	0	—		—		—		21	0
Le Mont	2016–17	Swiss Challenge League	17	0	0	0	—		—		17	0
Neuchâtel Xamax	2017–18	Swiss Challenge League	21	1	1	0	—		—		22	1
Livingston	2018–19	Scottish Premiership	25	1	0	0	0	0	—		25	1
Livingston	2019–20	Scottish Premiership	19	0	2	0	2	0	—		23	0
Livingston	2020–21	Scottish Premiership	15	0	0	0	2	0	—		17	0
Livingston	Total		59	1	2	0	4	0	0	0	65	1
Career total			155	3	4	0	4	0	0	0	163	3
