= Gabriel Forsyth =

Scottish footballer (born 2006)

Personal information
- Full name: Gabriel Kevin Forsyth
- Date of birth: 4 August 2006 (age 20)
- Height: 1.83 m (6 ft 0 in)
- Position: Midfielder

Team information
- Current team: Norwich City
- Number: 41

Youth career
- 2018–2022: Hamilton Academical

Senior career*
Years	Team	Apps	(Gls)
2022–2023	Hamilton Academical	2	(0)
2023–	Norwich City	5	(0)

International career^{‡}
2022–2023	Scotland U16	6	(1)
2022–2023	Scotland U17	6	(1)
2024–	Scotland U19	2	(0)
- * Club domestic league appearances and goals as of 20:00, 2 November 2024 (UTC) ‡ National team caps and goals as of 21:07, 19 August 2024 (UTC)

Gabriel Kevin Forsyth (born 4 August 2006) is a Scottish professional footballer who plays as a midfielder for EFL Championship club Norwich City.

== Club career ==
Forsyth began his career with Hamilton Academical in 2018, turning professional in December 2022.

He agreed a transfer to Norwich City on 30 June 2023. On 15 August 2024, he extended his contract with Norwich until 2027.

== International career ==
He is a Scotland youth international, and played for the Scotland U17s at the 2023 UEFA European Under-17 Championship.

== Career statistics ==
As of match played 2 November 2024

Appearances and goals by club, season and competition
Club	Season	League			National cup (Note: Includes Scottish Cup and FA Cup)		League cup (Note: Includes Scottish League Cup and EFL Cup)		Other		Total	
Club	Season	Division	Apps	Goals	Apps	Goals	Apps	Goals	Apps	Goals	Apps	Goals
Hamilton Academical	2022–23	Scottish Championship	2	0	1	0	0	0	2 (Note: Appearance(s) in Scottish Challenge Cup)	0	5	0
Norwich City	2024–25	Championship	5	0	0	0	2	0	—		7	0
Norwich City	2025–26	Championship	0	0	0	0	0	0	—		0	0
Norwich City	2026–27	Championship	0	0	0	0	0	0	—		0	0
Norwich City	Total		5	0	0	0	2	0	0	0	7	0
Career total			7	0	1	0	2	0	2	0	12	0
