= Reghan Tumilty =

Scottish footballer (born 1997)

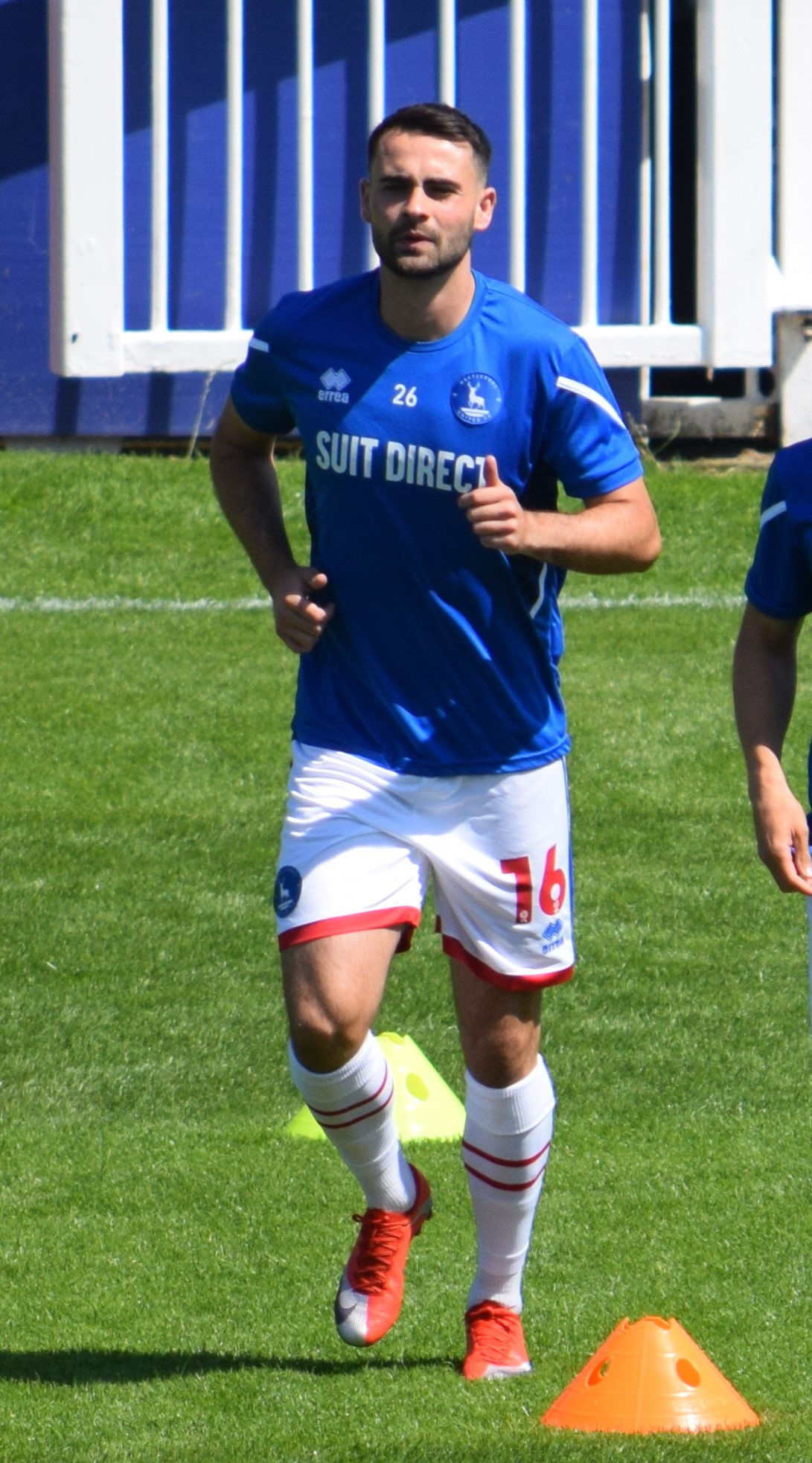
- Tumilty warming up for Hartlepool United in 2022

Personal information
- Date of birth: 26 February 1997 (age 29)
- Place of birth: Glasgow, Scotland
- Position: Defender

Team information
- Current team: Airdrieonians
- Number: 24

Youth career
- 2013–2016: Dundee United

Senior career*
| Years | Team | Apps | (Gls) |
| 2016–2018 | Ross County | 10 | (0) |
| 2017–2018 | → Falkirk (loan) | 17 | (1) |
| 2018–2020 | Greenock Morton | 45 | (3) |
| 2019–2020 | → Dumbarton (loan) | 17 | (3) |
| 2020–2022 | Raith Rovers | 62 | (5) |
| 2022–2023 | Hartlepool United | 18 | (0) |
| 2023–2025 | Hamilton Academical | 76 | (8) |
| 2025–2026 | St Johnstone | 8 | (0) |
| 2026– | Airdrieonians | 2 | (0) |
- * Club domestic league appearances and goals as of 20:38, 14 October 2026

Reghan Tumilty (born 26 February 1997) is a Scottish professional footballer who plays as a defender for Scottish League One side Airdrieonians.

== Career ==
Tumilty started his career at Dundee United in 2013 but was transferred to Ross County on 10 June 2016. On 28 December 2016, he made his senior debut, coming on as a substitute against Celtic and on 16 April 2017 he made his first competitive start, also against Celtic.

Tumilty was loaned to Falkirk in November 2017, with the loan extended until the end of the season on 17 January 2018. He left Ross County in May 2018.

On 17 July 2018, Tumilty signed for Greenock Morton on a one-year contract. He scored on the same day against Partick Thistle in the League Cup, his first competitive match and goal in the competition. After making forty appearances, he extended his contract in June 2019. On 24 August 2019, Tumilty joined Dumbarton on loan until January 2020. scoring on his debut for them against Stranraer on the same day.

On 3 August 2020, Tumilty signed a two-year contract with Scottish Championship club Raith Rovers. During his spell with Raith, Tumilty made 85 appearances.

On 21 June 2022, Tumilty moved into the English divisions, signing for League Two side Hartlepool United. Upon leaving the Scottish Championship, Tumilty claimed he was "bored of playing the same nine teams". Tumilty was signed by Paul Hartley, formerly of Cove Rangers who also signed several other players from the Scottish divisions. In November 2022, Tumilty scored his first goal for the club which was a late equaliser in a 1–1 draw with Solihull Moors in an FA Cup first round replay which Hartlepool won on penalties. On 24 January 2023, Tumilty left Hartlepool with mutual consent.

In February 2023, Tumilty signed for Scottish Championship side Hamilton Academical. Tumilty scored the winner for Hamilton in the 2023 Scottish Challenge Cup final against his former club Raith Rovers in a 1–0 win. At the end of the 2022–23 season, Tumilty left Hamilton, but re-signed a few days later.

In June 2025, Tumilty signed for Scottish Championship side St Johnstone On 27 May 2026, Tumilty was released by St Johnstone at the end of his contract.

On 18 September 2026, Tumilty signed for Scottish League One side Airdrieonians.

== Career statistics ==
As of 1 May 2026

Appearances and goals by club, season and competition
| Club | Season | League | | | Scottish Cup | | League Cup | | Other | | Total | |
| Club | Season | Division | Apps | Goals | Apps | Goals | Apps | Goals | Apps | Goals | Apps | Goals |
|---|---|---|---|---|---|---|---|---|---|---|---|---|
| Ross County | 2016–17 | Scottish Premiership | 8 | 0 | 1 | 0 | 0 | 0 | 1 (Note: Appearance for Ross County under-20s in Scottish Challenge Cup in which age-restricted sides from the Scottish Premiership clubs compete against senior clubs) | 0 | 10 | 0 |
| Ross County | 2017–18 | Scottish Premiership | 2 | 0 | 0 | 0 | 0 | 0 | 0 | 0 | 2 | 0 |
| Ross County | Total | | 10 | 0 | 1 | 0 | 0 | 0 | 1 | 0 | 12 | 0 |
| Falkirk (loan) | 2017–18 | Scottish Championship | 17 | 1 | 3 | 1 | 0 | 0 | 0 | 0 | 20 | 2 |
| Greenock Morton | 2018–19 | Scottish Championship | 34 | 0 | 3 | 0 | 3 | 1 | 0 | 0 | 40 | 1 |
| Greenock Morton | 2019–20 | Scottish Championship | 11 | 3 | 1 | 0 | 3 | 0 | 0 | 0 | 15 | 3 |
| Greenock Morton | Total | | 45 | 3 | 4 | 0 | 6 | 1 | 0 | 0 | 55 | 4 |
| Dumbarton (loan) | 2019–20 | Scottish League One | 17 | 3 | 0 | 0 | 0 | 0 | 0 | 0 | 17 | 3 |
| Raith Rovers | 2020–21 | Scottish Championship | 27 | 3 | 2 | 0 | 4 | 0 | 4 (Note: Appearances in Championship play-offs) | 0 | 37 | 3 |
| Raith Rovers | 2021–22 | Scottish Championship | 35 | 2 | 2 | 0 | 6 | 0 | 5 (Note: Appearance in Scottish Challenge Cup) | 0 | 48 | 2 |
| Raith Rovers | Total | | 62 | 5 | 4 | 0 | 10 | 0 | 9 | 0 | 85 | 5 |
| Hartlepool United | 2022–23 | League Two | 18 | 0 | 4 | 1 | 1 | 0 | 2 | 0 | 25 | 1 |
| Hamilton Academical | 2022–23 | Scottish Championship | 12 | 0 | 1 | 0 | 0 | 0 | 2 | 1 | 15 | 1 |
| Hamilton Academical | 2023–24 | Scottish League One | 33 | 4 | 1 | 0 | 4 | 1 | 2 | 0 | 40 | 5 |
| Hamilton Academical | 2024–25 | Scottish League One | 31 | 4 | 3 | 0 | 3 | 0 | 2 | 0 | 39 | 4 |
| Hamilton Academical | Total | | 76 | 8 | 5 | 0 | 7 | 1 | 6 | 1 | 94 | 10 |
| St Johnstone | 2025–26 | Scottish Championship | 8 | 0 | 1 | 0 | 4 | 1 | 1 | 0 | 14 | 1 |
| Career total | | | 253 | 20 | 22 | 2 | 28 | 3 | 19 | 1 | 322 | 26 |

== Honours ==
Raith Rovers

- Scottish Challenge Cup: 2021–22

Hamilton Academical

- Scottish Challenge Cup: 2022–23

St Johnstone

- Scottish Championship: 2025–26
