= Reegan Mimnaugh =

Scottish footballer

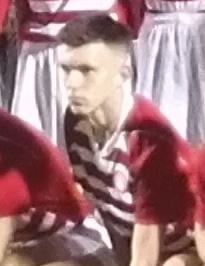
- Mimnaugh with Hamilton U19s, 2018

Personal information
- Date of birth: 18 December 2001 (age 24)
- Place of birth: Wishaw, Scotland
- Height: 1.73 m (5 ft 8 in)
- Position: Midfielder

Team information
- Current team: East Kilbride
- Number: 17

Youth career
- Hamilton Academical

Senior career*
Years	Team	Apps	(Gls)
2018–2023	Hamilton Academical	73	(0)
2023–2024	Queen of the South	6	(1)
2024–	East Kilbride	12	(1)
- * Club domestic league appearances and goals as of 14 December 2024

Reegan Mimnaugh (born 18 December 2001) is a Scottish professional footballer who plays for Scottish League One club East Kilbride as a midfielder.

== Career ==
He was a participant in the Scottish Football Association's Performance School programme at Braidhurst High School.

In December 2019 he was linked with Fulham and Leeds United. He signed a new contract with Hamilton in April 2021. He left the club in June 2023.

On 20 June 2023, Mimnaugh signed a one-year contract with Queen of the South. He signed for East Kilbride in June 2024.

== Honours ==
Hamilton Academical

- Scottish Challenge Cup: 2022–23
