= Jean-Pierre Tiéhi =

French footballer (born 2002)

Personal information
- Full name: Jean-Pierre Alberic Tiéhi
- Date of birth: 24 January 2002 (age 24)
- Place of birth: Paris, France
- Height: 1.78 m (5 ft 10 in)
- Position: Striker

Team information
- Current team: Villefranche

Youth career
- –2018: Le Havre
- 2018–2021: Fulham

Senior career*
| Years | Team | Apps | (Gls) |
| 2021–2023 | Fulham | 0 | (0) |
| 2022 | → Rodez (loan) | 2 | (0) |
| 2022 | → Rodez B (loan) | 5 | (1) |
| 2022–2023 | → Hamilton Academical (loan) | 32 | (3) |
| 2023–2024 | AEK Athens B | 21 | (3) |
| 2024–2025 | Avranches | 29 | (5) |
| 2025–2026 | Politehnica Iași | 24 | (3) |
| 2026– | Villefranche | 0 | (0) |
- * Club domestic league appearances and goals as of 2 May 2026

Jean-Pierre Alberic Tiéhi (born 24 January 2002) is a French professional footballer who plays as a striker for Ligue 3 club Villefranche.

== Early and personal life ==
Born in Paris, Tiéhi is the son of Ivorian footballer Joel Tiéhi, and the brother of Christ Tiéhi.

== Career ==
Tiéhi moved from Le Havre to English club Fulham in summer 2018. He returned to France on loan in January 2022, signing with Rodez. He made his senior debut for the club on 19 February 2022, one of four new players to do so in that match.

He moved on loan to Scottish club Hamilton Academical in August 2022.

He was released by Fulham at the end of the 2022–23 season. He signed for Greek club AEK Athens B in September 2023.

After playing back in France for Avranches, he signed for Romanian club Politehnica Iași in July 2025.

On 11 July 2026, he signed for Ligue 3 club Villefranche.

== Honours ==
Hamilton Academical

- Scottish Challenge Cup: 2022–23
