= 2022–23 Scottish Challenge Cup =

Tournament details
- Country: Scotland; Northern Ireland; Wales
- Dates: 9 August 2022 – 26 March 2023
- Teams: 53

Final positions
- Champions: Hamilton Academical
- Runners-up: Raith Rovers

Tournament statistics
- Matches played: 52
- Goals scored: 157 (3.02 per match)
- Top goal scorer(s): Alex Lowry; Steven Warnock (4 goals)
- All statistics correct as of 26 March 2023.

The 2022–23 Scottish Challenge Cup known as the SPFL Trust Trophy due to sponsorship reasons, was the 31st season of the competition. The total number of participating clubs was 53, up from 50, with the return of clubs from Wales and Northern Ireland. The competition began on 9 August 2022 with the first round and ended on 26 March 2023 with the final at Falkirk Stadium.

Thirty teams from the Championship, League One and League Two competed, along with four teams from the Highland Football League and four from the Lowland Football League. In addition to this, Under-21 teams from 11 of the 12 clubs competing in the Scottish Premiership were represented. This season also saw the return of guest clubs, with two sides each coming from Northern Ireland's NIFL Premiership and Wales' Cymru Premier.

The defending champions were Raith Rovers, who lost 1–0 in the final to Hamilton Academical.

== Format ==
Round	Date	Fixtures	Clubs	New entries
First Round	9–10 August 2022	11	53 → 42	3 teams from 2021–22 Scottish League Two (8th-10th); 4 teams from 2021–22 Lowland Football League (1st–4th); 4 teams from 2021–22 Highland Football League (1st–4th); 11 U21 teams from 2022–23 Scottish Premiership
Second Round	23–24 August 2022	10	42 → 32	2 teams from 2021–22 Scottish League One (9th-10th); 7 teams from 2021–22 Scottish League Two (1st–7th)
Third Round	24–25 September 2022	16	32 → 16	Teams from 2021–22 Scottish Championship; 8 teams from 2021–22 Scottish League One (1st–8th); 2 teams from 2021–22 NIFL Premiership (1st and 2nd); 2 teams from 2021–22 Cymru Premier (1st and 4th)
Fourth Round	8–10 December 2022	8	16 → 8	
Quarter-finals	10–24 January 2023	4	8 → 4	
Semi-finals	7–8 February 2023	2	4 → 2	
Final	25–26 March 2023	1	2 → 1	

== First round ==
The first round featured 3 clubs from 2021–22 Scottish League Two, 4 clubs from the 2021–22 Scottish Highland Football League, 4 clubs from the 2021–22 Scottish Lowland Football League and 11 of the 12 under-21 teams of the 2022–23 Scottish Premiership, with Ross County not entering an under-21 team.

The draw was made on 4 July 2022 at 13:00 and broadcast live on the SPFL YouTube Channel. The draw was regionalised and all non-Under 21 teams were seeded. The matches were played on 9 and 10 August 2022.

=== North Section ===
==== Draw ====
Teams that entered the competition in the first round.

Teams in bold advanced to the second round.

Seeded Teams	Unseeded Teams
**Elgin City**; Fraserburgh; **Buckie Thistle**; **Brechin City**; **Brora Rangers**	Aberdeen B; Dundee United B; Heart of Midlothian B; Hibernian B; **St Johnstone B**

==== Matches ====
9 August 2022	**Brora Rangers**	**2–0**	Aberdeen B	Brora
19:30	J. MacRae 73'; A. MacRae 79'			Stadium: Dudgeon Park; Attendance: 149; Referee: Ross Hardie

9 August 2022	Fraserburgh	**0–3** **(awarded)**	**St Johnstone B**	Fraserburgh
19:45			Pert 34'; Steven 70'	Stadium: Bellslea Park; Attendance: 261; Referee: Alex Shepherd

9 August 2022	**Elgin City**	**1–0**	Dundee United B	Elgin
19:45	Hester 61'			Stadium: Borough Briggs; Attendance: 486; Referee: Steven Kirkland

10 August 2022	Hibernian B	**1–1** (**1–4** p)	**Brechin City**	Newtongrange
19:45	Laidlaw 84'		Northcott 71'	Stadium: New Victoria Park; Attendance: 266; Referee: Jordan Curran
	**Penalties**
	O'Connor (penalty missed); Hamilton (penalty missed); Laidlaw (penalty scored)		(penalty scored) Bain; (penalty scored) Loudon; (penalty scored) Davidson; (penalty scored) Inglis

10 August 2022	Heart of Midlothian B	**2–3**	**Buckie Thistle**	Rosewell
20:00	C.Smith 35'; McGill 70'		Murray 50'; Ramsay 73'; Pugh 75'	Stadium: Ferguson Park; Attendance: 313; Referee: George Calder

=== South Section ===
==== Draw ====
Teams that entered the competition in the first round.

Teams in bold advanced to the second round.

Seeded Teams	Unseeded Teams
Albion Rovers; Cowdenbeath; Bonnyrigg Rose; **East Kilbride**; The Spartans; **East Stirlingshire**	**Celtic B**; **Kilmarnock B**; **Livingston B**; Motherwell B; **Rangers B**; St Mirren B

==== Matches ====
9 August 2022	Bonnyrigg Rose Athletic	**0–0** (**1–3** p)	**Livingston B**	Bonnyrigg
19:45				Stadium: New Dundas Park; Attendance: 613; Referee: Greg Soutar
	**Penalties**
	Martyniuk (penalty missed); Currie (penalty missed); Turner (penalty scored); Doan (penalty missed)		(penalty scored) Binnie; (penalty scored) Bitsindou; (penalty scored) McFarlane-Letham; (penalty missed) Aitken

9 August 2022	Motherwell B	**1–2**	**East Kilbride**	East Kilbride
19:45	Hunter 83' (pen.)		Victoria 1'; Hughes 90'	Stadium: K-Park Training Academy; Attendance: 240; Referee: Colin Whyte

9 August 2022	Albion Rovers	**2–3**	**Celtic B**	Coatbridge
19:45	Fagan 2'; Corr 28' (o.g.)		Vata 32'; Lawal 39'; Moffat 50'	Stadium: Cliftonhill; Attendance: 542; Referee: Lloyd Wilson

9 August 2022	**Kilmarnock B**	**3–0**	Cowdenbeath	Kilmarnock
19:45	Wales 19'; Warnock 20'; Sotona 54'			Stadium: Rugby Park; Attendance: 192; Referee: Stewart Luke

9 August 2022	St Mirren B	**0–0** (**2–4** p)	**East Stirlingshire**	Paisley
19:45				Stadium: St Mirren Park; Attendance: 257; Referee: Chris Fordyce
	**Penalties**
	Taylor (penalty scored); Gallagher (penalty missed); Henderson (penalty missed); Olusanya (penalty scored)		(penalty scored) Barr; (penalty scored) Greene; (penalty scored) Hodge; (penalty scored) Wilson

10 August 2022	Spartans	**0–1**	**Rangers B**	Edinburgh
19:45			Lowry 77'	Stadium: Ainslie Park; Attendance: 331; Referee: Barry Cook

Note

1. A: St Johnstone B were awarded a technical 3−0 win over Fraserburgh, who fielded 3 ineligible players. The match had originally finished 2–0 to St Johnstone B.

== Second round ==
The second round featured the 11 winners from the previous round, along with 2 clubs from 2021–22 Scottish League One and 7 clubs from 2021–22 Scottish League Two.

The draw for the second round was also made on 4 July 2022 at 13:00 on the live broadcast from the SPFL YouTube Channel. The draw was regionalised, but not seeded. The matches were played on 23 and 24 August 2022.

=== North Section ===
==== Draw ====
Teams that entered the competition in the second round.

- East Fife
- Forfar Athletic
- Kelty Hearts
- Stenhousemuir
- Stirling Albion

==== Matches ====
23 August 2022	Elgin City	3–1	Stenhousemuir	Elgin
19:45	Hester 29'; Dolzanski 33'; Dingwall 58'		Orr 72'	Stadium: Borough Briggs; Attendance: 411; Referee: Alex Shepherd

23 August 2022	Forfar Athletic	1–2	Kelty Hearts	Forfar
19:45	Moore 54'		Munro 10' (o.g.); Hunter 86'	Stadium: Station Park; Attendance: 317; Referee: George Calder

23 August 2022	East Fife	4–0	St Johnstone B	Methil
19:45	Trouten 15' (pen.); Mercer 58'; Cunningham 80'; Martin 85'			Stadium: Bayview Stadium; Attendance: 202; Referee: Ross Hardie

24 August 2022	Brechin City	1–1 (5–4 p)	Stirling Albion	Brechin
19:45	Scott 11'		Carrick 59'	Stadium: Glebe Park; Attendance: 256; Referee: Daniel Graves
	Penalties
	Bain (penalty scored); Loudon (penalty scored); Scott (penalty missed); Ross (penalty scored); McGrath (penalty scored); Patrick (penalty scored)		(penalty scored) H. Clark; (penalty scored) Davidson; (penalty scored) C. Clark; (penalty scored) Banner; (penalty missed) Denholm; (penalty missed) Leitch

24 August 2022	Buckie Thistle	1–1 (4–2 p)	Brora Rangers	Buckie
20:00	Peters 49'		A. MacRae 71'	Stadium: Victoria Park; Attendance: 238; Referee: Colin Whyte
	Penalties
	Urquhart (penalty scored); Peters (penalty scored); MacAskill (penalty scored); Pugh (penalty scored)		(penalty scored) Gillespie; (penalty scored) MacLean; (penalty missed) MacDonald; (penalty missed) J. MacRae

=== South Section ===
==== Draw ====
Teams that entered the competition in the second round.

- Annan Athletic
- Dumbarton
- Edinburgh
- Stranraer

==== Matches ====
23 August 2022	Rangers B	7–0	Dumbarton	Dumbarton
19:45	Lowry 8', 16' (pen.), 49'; McCann 34'; Lovelace 42'; Lyall 70'; Kelly 82'			Stadium: Dumbarton Football Stadium; Attendance: 645; Referee: Iain Snedden

23 August 2022	East Kilbride	1–1 (4–5 p)	Annan Athletic	East Kilbride
19:45	Mortimer 11'		Goss 69'	Stadium: K-Park Training Academy; Attendance: 172; Referee: Greg Soutar
	Penalties
	McLaughlin (penalty scored); Elliott (penalty scored); Mortimer (penalty scored); Bronsky (penalty scored); Miller (penalty missed)		(penalty scored) Goss; (penalty scored) Docherty; (penalty scored) Williamson; (penalty scored) McCartney; (penalty scored) Fleming

23 August 2022	Kilmarnock B	5–2	East Stirlingshire	Kilmarnock
19:45	Warnock 16'; Wales 21'; Stokes 38'; Lesley 77'; McKnight 88'		Watson 8'; Honeyman 34'	Stadium: Rugby Park; Attendance: 305; Referee: Alastair Grieve

24 August 2022	Celtic B	3–0	Livingston B	Airdrie
19:45	Brooks 20'; Lawal 50'; Quinn 90'			Stadium: Excelsior Stadium; Attendance: N/A; Referee: Lloyd Wilson

24 August 2022	Edinburgh	3–2	Stranraer	Edinburgh
19:45	Handling 22', 41', 50'		Walker 27'; Watt 90'	Stadium: Meadowbank Stadium; Attendance: 248; Referee: Jordan Curran

== Third round ==
The third round featured the 10 winners from the previous round, along with all 10 clubs from 2022–23 Scottish Championship, 8 clubs from 2021–22 Scottish League One, 2 clubs from 2021–22 NIFL Premiership and 2 clubs from 2021–22 Cymru Premier.

The draw was made on 29 August 2022 at 13:00 and broadcast live on the SPFL YouTube Channel. This draw was not regionalised or seeded, but cross-border clubs were kept apart for this round. The matches were played between 22 September and 15 November 2022.

=== Draw ===
Teams that enter the competition in the third round.

Championship	League One	Teams from other countries
Arbroath; Ayr United; Cove Rangers; Dundee; Greenock Morton; Hamilton Academical; Inverness Caledonian Thistle; Partick Thistle; Queen's Park; Raith Rovers	Dunfermline Athletic; Queen of the South; Airdrieonians; Montrose; Alloa Athletic; Falkirk; Peterhead; Clyde	NIFL Premiership: Linfield; Cliftonville; Cymru Premier: The New Saints; Caernarfon Town

==== Matches ====
22 September 2022	Greenock Morton	1–1 (5–4 p)	Ayr United	Greenock
19:45	McGregor 12'		Mullin 39'	Stadium: Cappielow; Attendance: 988; Referee: Craig Napier
	Penalties
	Gillespie (penalty scored); Blues (penalty scored); Muirhead (penalty scored); Kabia (penalty scored); Grimshaw (penalty scored)		(penalty missed) McGinty; (penalty scored) Murdoch; (penalty scored) Akinyemi; (penalty scored) Dempsey; (penalty scored) Houston

22 September 2022	Queen of the South	4–0	Edinburgh	Dumfries
19:45	Murray 23'; McKay 54'; Ruth 71'; Connelly 84'			Stadium: Palmerston Park; Attendance: 688; Referee: Chris Graham

23 September 2022	Alloa Athletic	1–0	Airdrieonians	Alloa
19:45	Sammon 81'			Stadium: Recreation Park; Attendance: 641; Referee: Greg Aitken

23 September 2022	Annan Athletic	1–2	Kelty Hearts	Annan
19:45	Goss 63' (pen.)		Low 58' (pen.); Barjonas 90'	Stadium: Galabank; Attendance: 331; Referee: Calum Scott

23 September 2022	Falkirk	2–0	Partick Thistle	Falkirk
19:45	Burrell 9'; Oliver 65'			Stadium: Falkirk Stadium; Attendance: 2,720; Referee: Lloyd Wilson

23 September 2022	The New Saints	0–3	Dundee	Oswestry, England
20:00			Sheridan 48'; Cameron 51'; Anderson 90'	Stadium: Park Hall; Attendance: 508; Referee: Tom Owen

24 September 2022	Inverness Caledonian Thistle	3–3 (4–3 p)	Brechin City	Inverness
14:00	Oakley 6', 47' (pen.); Shaw 38'		McHattie 28'; McGrath 72'; Spark 78'	Stadium: Caledonian Stadium; Attendance: 832; Referee: Barry Cook
	Penalties
	McKay (penalty scored); Oakley (penalty missed); Boyd (penalty scored); Allardice (penalty scored); Deas (penalty scored)		Bain (penalty missed); McGrath (penalty scored); Loudon (penalty scored); Inglis (penalty scored); McInnes (penalty missed)

24 September 2022	Montrose	4–2	Kilmarnock B	Montrose
14:00	Gardyne 17'; Brown 74', 81'; Johnston 89'		Warnock 51', 66' (pen.)	Stadium: Links Park; Attendance: 423; Referee: Ross Hardie

24 September 2022	Buckie Thistle	1–2	Linfield	Buckie
15:00	Goodall 53'		Cooper 74'; Quinn 75'	Stadium: Victoria Park; Attendance: 561; Referee: Chris Fordyce

24 September 2022	Clyde	1–0	Caernarfon Town	Hamilton
15:00	Grant 90'			Stadium: New Douglas Park; Attendance: 552; Referee: Scott Lambie

24 September 2022	Peterhead	0–4	Elgin City	Peterhead
15:00			Dingwall 9'; Hester 35'; Lawrence 68'; Mailer 85'	Stadium: Balmoor Stadium; Attendance: 565; Referee: Graham Beaton

24 September 2022	Cove Rangers	0–1	Raith Rovers	Aberdeen
15:00			McBride 11'	Stadium: Balmoral Stadium; Attendance: 405; Referee: Gavin Duncan

24 September 2022	Arbroath	2–1	East Fife	Arbroath
15:00	McKenna 10' (pen.); Hilson 12'		Healy 90'	Stadium: Gayfield Park; Attendance: 1,123; Referee: Graham Grainger

25 September 2022	Cliftonville	2–3	Queen's Park	Belfast, Northern Ireland
13:45	Coates 14'; Addis 51'		Savoury 3'; Williamson 27'; Thomas 71'	Stadium: Solitude; Attendance: 1,116; Referee: Lee Tavinder

8 November 2022	Rangers B	0–3	Hamilton Academical	Dumbarton
19:45			Zanatta 32', 73'; Mimnaugh 51' (pen.)	Stadium: Dumbarton Football Stadium; Attendance: 404; Referee: Dan McFarlane

15 November 2022	Dunfermline Athletic	2–1	Celtic B	Dunfermline
19:45	Sutherland 3'; Todorov 25'		Kenny 36'	Stadium: East End Park; Attendance: 1,287; Referee: Calum Scott

== Fourth round ==
No new teams entered in this round.

The draw was made on 4 October 2022 at 13:00 and was broadcast live on the SPFL YouTube Channel. The matches were played on 8, 9 and 10 December 2022.

Teams in Bold advanced to the quarter-finals.

Championship	League One	League Two	Other
Arbroath; **Dundee**; Greenock Morton; **Hamilton Academical**; Inverness Caledonian Thistle; **Queen's Park**; **Raith Rovers**	Alloa Athletic; **Clyde**; **Dunfermline Athletic**; **Kelty Hearts**; Falkirk; Montrose; **Queen of the South**	Elgin City	NIFL Premiership: Linfield

=== Matches ===
8 December 2022	Falkirk	**0–3**	**Dundee**	Falkirk
19:45			Rudden 5' (pen.), 14'; Robertson 77'	Stadium: Falkirk Stadium; Attendance: 1,700; Referee: Calum Scott

9 December 2022	Alloa Athletic	**2–4**	**Queen of the South**	Alloa
19:45	King 15'; Cawley 39'		Connelly 3', 78' (pen.); McKenna 49'; Todd 82'	Stadium: Recreation Park; Attendance: 274; Referee: Graham Grainger

9 December 2022	Arbroath	**1–5**	**Dunfermline Athletic**	Arbroath
19:45	O'Brien 74'		MacDonald 6'; Todd 19', 36'; Benedictus 22'; Wighton 68'	Stadium: Gayfield Park; Attendance: 874; Referee: Chris Graham

10 December 2022	Elgin City	**0–0** (**2–4** p)	**Clyde**	Elgin
14:00				Stadium: Borough Briggs; Attendance: 456; Referee: Peter Stuart
	**Penalties**
	McHardy (penalty missed); Cameron (penalty scored); Dingwall (penalty scored); Allen (penalty missed)		(penalty scored) McLean; (penalty scored) Allan; (penalty scored) R. Grant; (penalty scored) P. Grant

10 December 2022	**Raith Rovers**	**1–1** (**4–2** p)	Greenock Morton	Kirkcaldy
15:00	Vaughan 61'		King 49'	Stadium: Starks Park; Attendance: 833; Referee: Mike Roncone
	**Penalties**
	Gullan (penalty scored); Connell (penalty scored); Connolly (penalty scored); Millen (penalty scored)		(penalty scored) Kabia; (penalty missed) King; (penalty scored) McGrattan; (penalty missed) Grimshaw

10 December 2022	**Kelty Hearts**	**1–1** (**5–4** p)	Linfield	Kelty
15:00	Higginbotham 83'		McKee 44' (pen.)	Stadium: New Central Park; Attendance: 1,340; Referee: Craig Napier
	**Penalties**
	Low (penalty scored); Higginbotham (penalty missed); Barjonas (penalty scored); McNab (penalty scored); Cardle (penalty scored); Austin (penalty scored)		(penalty missed) Callacher; (penalty scored) Devine; (penalty scored) McClean; (penalty scored) Palmer; (penalty scored) Quinn; (penalty missed) Pepper

10 December 2022	**Queen's Park**	**2–0**	Montrose	Glasgow
15:00	Thomas 27'; McPake 90+2'			Stadium: Hampden Park; Attendance: 1,013; Referee: Scott Lambie

10 December 2022	**Hamilton Academical**	**2–0**	Inverness Caledonian Thistle	Hamilton
15:00	S. Nixon 4' (o.g.); Mimnaugh 33'			Stadium: New Douglas Park; Attendance: 488; Referee: Duncan Williams

== Quarter-finals ==
The draw was made on 13 December 2022 at 13:00 along with the semi-final draw live on the SPFL YouTube channel. The matches were played on 10, 11 and 24 January 2023.

Teams in Bold advanced to the semi-finals.

Championship	League One
**Dundee**; **Hamilton Academical**; Queen's Park; **Raith Rovers**	Clyde; Dunfermline Athletic; Kelty Hearts; **Queen of the South**

=== Matches ===
10 January 2023	**Hamilton Academical**	**3–2**	Clyde	Hamilton
19:45	Owens 31'; Tiéhi 54'; O'Reilly 82'		Cunningham 9'; J. Smith 36' (o.g.)	Stadium: New Douglas Park; Attendance: 630; Referee: Greg Aitken

10 January 2023	**Queen of the South**	**0–0** (**4–2** p)	Kelty Hearts	Dumfries
19:45				Stadium: Palmerston Park; Attendance: 602; Referee: Matthew MacDermid
	**Penalties**
	Reilly (penalty scored); Paton (penalty scored); Connelly (penalty missed); Todd (penalty scored); McGrory (penalty scored)		(penalty scored) Tidser; (penalty scored) Bajonas; (penalty missed) Doherty; (penalty missed) McNab

11 January 2023	Queen's Park	**0–1**	**Raith Rovers**	Stenhousemuir
19:45			Frederiksen 80'	Stadium: Ochilview Park; Attendance: 636; Referee: Chris Graham

24 January 2023	**Dundee**	**4–2**	Dunfermline Athletic	Dundee
19:45	McMullan 29'; Robertson 59'; McCowan 83'; Anderson 90+1'		McCann 38'; Wighton 90+3'	Stadium: Dens Park; Attendance: 2,089; Referee: Craig Napier

== Semi-finals ==
=== Matches ===
7 February 2023	Hamilton Academical	2–1 (a.e.t.)	Queen of the South	Hamilton
19:45	Zanatta 21'; One 96'		Irving 72'	Stadium: New Douglas Park; Attendance: 1,049; Referee: Craig Napier

8 February 2023	Dundee	2–2 (a.e.t.) (3–4 p)	Raith Rovers	Dundee
19:45	Cameron 5', 28'		Akio 77'; Stanton 82'	Stadium: Dens Park; Attendance: 2,948; Referee: Colin Steven
	Penalties
	McGhee (penalty scored); Williamson (penalty scored); Tolaj (penalty scored); Anderson (penalty missed); Robinson (penalty missed)		(penalty scored) Spencer; (penalty scored) Akio; (penalty missed) Connolly; (penalty scored) Millen; (penalty scored) Easton

== Final ==
26 March 2023
16:15

Raith Rovers	0–1	Hamilton Academical
		Tumilty 30'

Falkirk Stadium, Falkirk
Attendance: 5,566
Referee: Colin Steven
