= Daniel O'Reilly (footballer) =

Irish association footballer

Personal information
- Date of birth: 11 April 1995 (age 31)
- Place of birth: Celbridge, County Kildare, Ireland
- Position: Centre back

Team information
- Current team: Partick Thistle
- Number: 20

Youth career
- Cherry Orchard
- 2010–2014: Fulham

Senior career*
Years	Team	Apps	(Gls)
2014	Fulham	0	(0)
2014	→ Walton Casuals (loan)	0	(0)
2014	Hereford United		
2014	Bishop's Stortford		
2015	Bray Wanderers	14	(0)
2016	Longford Town	8	(0)
2016	Eastbourne Borough	4	(0)
2017–2018	Longford Town	52	(4)
2019	Finn Harps	33	(2)
2020	Shelbourne	9	(0)
2021	Drogheda United	36	(1)
2022–2023	Hamilton Academical	50	(6)
2023–2024	Raith Rovers	6	(3)
2024–	Partick Thistle	80	(5)

International career
2010	Republic of Ireland U15	2	(0)
2011	Republic of Ireland U17	1	(0)
2012	Republic of Ireland U18	1	(0)
- * Club domestic league appearances and goals as of 12:37, 4 November 2026 (UTC)

Daniel O'Reilly (born 11 April 1995) is an Irish professional footballer who plays for Scottish Championship club Partick Thistle as a centre back.

== Early life ==
O'Reilly was born in Dublin. He grew up in Celbridge and attended Salesian College Celbridge.

== Club career ==
=== Early career ===
O'Reilly started his youth career with Cherry Orchard before being signed by Fulham Academy in November 2010 aged 15. On 30 January 2014, O'Reilly was sent to Walton Casuals on a one-month loan. He stayed at Fulham in four years before being released, then had a brief stay at Southern Premier League Hereford United in 2014 before the club collapsed. He subsequently moved to Bishop's Stortford.

=== Return to Ireland ===
O'Reilly then returned to Ireland to play with Bray Wanderers. After a brief period at Eastbourne Borough, O'Reilly returned in 2016 to the League of Ireland, playing with Longford Town and Finn Harps.

At the end of the 2019 season he was voted Supporter's Player of the Year at Finn Harps. In November 2019 O'Reilly signed for Shelbourne.

In December 2020 he moved to 2020 League of Ireland First Division Winners Drogheda United ahead of their first season back in the League of Ireland Premier Division, where he was voted Club Player of the Year in his only season at the club.

=== Hamilton Academical ===
On 1 January 2022, O'Reilly's agency (Stephen Hunt Management) announced that he had signed for Scottish Championship side Hamilton Academical, after rejecting several offers from Ireland.

=== Raith Rovers ===
In November 2023 O'Reilly signed a deal until January 2024 with Scottish Championship side Raith Rovers after remaining a free agent since he left Hamilton in June 2023.

=== Partick Thistle ===
O'Reilly signed for fellow Scottish Championship side Partick Thistle in January 2024 on an 18-month contract.

O'Reilly signed a one-year contract extension with Thistle in October 2024.

O'Reilly scored his first goal for Thistle with a header from a corner, in a 2–0 away win over Airdrie.

O’Reilly won the Partick Thistle player of the year award for 2024–25, as voted for by Thistle supporters.

In October 2025, O’Reilly signed a further contract extension with Thistle, signing an extension until summer 2027, with the option of a further extension.

== International career ==
O'Reilly was selected as an unused sub for the Republic of Ireland U17 team in 2012, in a qualifying game against Kazakhstan.

== Career statistics ==
As of match played on 31 October 2026

Appearances and goals by club, season and competition
Club	Season	League			National Cup (Note: Includes FA Cup, FAI Cup & Scottish Cup)		League Cup (Note: Includes EFL Cup, League of Ireland Cup & Scottish League Cup)		Other		Total	
Club	Season	Division	Apps	Goals	Apps	Goals	Apps	Goals	Apps	Goals	Apps	Goals
Fulham	2013–14	Premier League	0	0	0	0	0	0	—		0	0
Walton Casuals (loan)	2013–14	Isthmian Division One South			—		—		—			
Hereford United	2014–15	Southern Football League	0	0	—		—		—		0	0
Bishop's Stortford	2014–15	National League South			—		—		—			
Bray Wanderers	2015	LOI Premier Division	14	0	0	0	1	0	1 (Note: Appearances in Leinster Senior Cup)	0	16	0
Longford Town	2016	LOI Premier Division	8	0	1	0	1	0	2	0	12	0
Eastbourne Borough	2016–17	National League South	4	0	4	0	—		4 (Note: Two appearances in FA Trophy, two appearances in Sussex Senior Challenge Cup)	0	12	0
Longford Town	2017	LOI First Division	25	2	3	0	1	0	1	0	30	2
Longford Town	2018	LOI First Division	27	2	2	1	2	1	1	0	32	4
Longford Town	Total		52	4	5	1	3	1	2	0	54	6
Finn Harps	2019	LOI Premier Division	33	2	1	0	1	0	2 (Note: Appearances in the 2019 League of Ireland Promotion/relegation play-off)	0	37	2
Shelbourne	2020	LOI Premier Division	9	0	2	0	—		1 (Note: Appearances in the 2020 League of Ireland Promotion/relegation play-off)	0	12	0
Drogheda United	2021	LOI Premier Division	36	1	0	0	—		—		36	1
Hamilton Academical	2021–22	Scottish Championship	17	1	—		—		—		17	1
Hamilton Academical	2022–23	Scottish Championship	33	5	2	0	4	0	8 (Note: 4 appearances, 1 goal in Scottish Challenge Cup & 4 appearances in Scottish Championship play-offs)	1	47	6
Hamilton Academical	Total		50	6	2	0	4	0	8	1	64	7
Raith Rovers	2023–24	Scottish Championship	6	3	1	0	—		0	0	7	3
Partick Thistle	2023–24	Scottish Championship	4	0	—		—		4 (Note: Appearances in Scottish Championship play-offs)	0	8	0
Partick Thistle	2024–25	Scottish Championship	36	3	1	0	3	0	3 (Note: Appearances in Scottish Championship play-offs)	0	0	0
Partick Thistle	2025–26	Scottish Championship	31	2	3	0	6	1	3 (Note: 1 appearance in Scottish Challenge Cup; 2 appearances in Scottish Championship play-offs)	0	43	3
Partick Thistle	2026–27	Scottish Championship	9	0	0	0	5	1	0	0	14	1
Partick Thistle	Total		80	5	1	0	8	1	10	0	100	4
Career total			292	22	20	1	24	3	30	1	366	24

== Honours ==
Longford Town

- PFAI First Division Team of the Year: 2 (2017, 2018)
