= List of Scottish football transfers winter 2021–22 =

This is a list of Scottish football transfers featuring at least one 2021–22 Scottish Premiership club or one 2021–22 Scottish Championship club which were completed after the summer 2021 transfer window closed and before the end of the 2021–22 season.

== List ==
Date	Name	Moving from	Moving to	Fee
1 September 2021	Tom Grivosti	Ross County	Elgin City	Loan
1 September 2021	Olivier Ntcham	Celtic	Swansea City	Free
2 September 2021	Ryan Shanley	Hibernian	Edinburgh City	Free
3 September 2021	Euan Henderson	Heart of Midlothian	Alloa Athletic	Loan
3 September 2021	Lee Hodson	Gillingham	Kilmarnock	Free
6 September 2021	Steven Bradley	Hibernian	Ayr United	Loan
6 September 2021	Michael Ruth	Aberdeen	Falkirk	Loan
7 September 2021	Matt Millar	Newcastle Jets	St Mirren	Free
7 September 2021	Barrie McKay	Swansea City	Heart of Midlothian	Free
9 September 2021	Stephen Hendrie	Morecambe	Partick Thistle	Free
10 September 2021	Efe Ambrose	Livingston	St Johnstone	Free
16 September 2021	Kieran Ngwenya	Aberdeen	Kelty Hearts	Loan
17 September 2021	Luca Connell	Celtic	Queen's Park	Loan
17 September 2021	Euan Deveney	Kilmarnock	Clyde	Loan
18 September 2021	Declan McDaid	Dundee	Falkirk	Loan
22 September 2021	James Keatings	Raith Rovers	Montrose	Loan
24 September 2021	Finlay Robertson	Dundee	Cove Rangers	Loan
28 September 2021	Cammy Ballantyne	St Johnstone	Montrose	Loan
29 September 2021	Callum Hendry	St Johnstone	Kilmarnock	Loan
29 September 2021	Mark Connolly	Dundee United	Dunfermline Athletic	Loan
30 September 2021	Innes Cameron	Kilmarnock	Queen of the South	Loan
1 October 2021	Daniel Finlayson	St Mirren	Kelty Hearts	Loan
6 October 2021	Maxime Biamou	Coventry City	Dundee United	Free
17 November 2021	Mathew Anim Cudjoe	Young Apostles	Dundee United	Free
24 November 2021	Viv Solomon-Otabor	Wigan Athletic	St Johnstone	Free
13 December 2021	Jacob Butterfield	Melbourne Victory	St Johnstone	Free
27 December 2021	Steven Lawless	Motherwell	Dunfermline Athletic	Free
29 December 2021	Aaron Taylor-Sinclair	Livingston	Falkirk	Free
31 December 2021	Daizen Maeda	Yokohama F. Marinos	Celtic	Loan
31 December 2021	Yosuke Ideguchi	Gamba Osaka	Celtic	Undisclosed
31 December 2021	Reo Hatate	Kawasaki Frontale	Celtic	Undisclosed
1 January 2022	Ben Williamson	Rangers	Raith Rovers	Loan
1 January 2022	Harry Panayiotou	Livingston	Aldershot Town	Free
1 January 2022	Ross Tierney	Bohemians	Motherwell	Free
1 January 2022	Nathaniel Atkinson	Melbourne City FC	Heart of Midlothian	Free
1 January 2022	Sam Stanton	Dundalk	Raith Rovers	Free
1 January 2022	Daniel Cleary	Dundalk	St Johnstone	Free
1 January 2022	Spencer Moreland	St Johnstone	Stenhousemuir	Loan
1 January 2022	Evan Towler	Aberdeen	Elgin City	Loan
1 January 2022	Harrison Clark	Livingston	Kelty Hearts	Loan
1 January 2022	Daniel O'Reilly	Drogheda United	Hamilton Academical	Free
1 January 2022	Jack Hamilton	Livingston	Arbroath	Loan
1 January 2022	Ellis Brown	Boreham Wood	Hamilton Academical	Undisclosed
1 January 2022	Chris Mueller	Orlando City SC	Hibernian	Free
2 January 2022	Mich'el Parker	Motherwell	Linfield	Free
3 January 2022	Coll Donaldson	Ross County	Dunfermline Athletic	Loan
3 January 2022	Jack Brydon	Hibernian	Edinburgh City	Loan
3 January 2022	Cammy Logan	Heart of Midlothian	Edinburgh City	Loan
3 January 2022	Ali Crawford	Bolton Wanderers	St Johnstone	Free
3 January 2022	Vytas Gašpuitis	Dunfermline Athletic	FA Šiauliai	Free
4 January 2022	Tony Gallacher	Liverpool	St Johnstone	Free
4 January 2022	Morgan Boyes	Liverpool	Livingston	Free
4 January 2022	Nathan Patterson	Rangers	Everton	£11.5 million
5 January 2022	Elias Melkersen	FK Bodø/Glimt	Hibernian	£300,000
5 January 2022	Josh McPake	Rangers	Tranmere Rovers	Loan
5 January 2022	Nadir Çiftçi	MKE Ankaragücü	St Johnstone	Free
5 January 2022	Trevor Carson	Dundee United	Morecambe	Loan
5 January 2022	James Sands	New York City FC	Rangers	Loan
6 January 2022	Ewan Henderson	Celtic	Hibernian	Loan
6 January 2022	Michael Gardyne	Inverness Caledonian Thistle	Montrose	Free
6 January 2022	Jamie Gullan	Hibernian	Raith Rovers	Free
6 January 2022	Carljohan Eriksson	Mjällby AIF	Dundee United	Free
6 January 2022	Harry Clarke	Arsenal	Hibernian	Loan
7 January 2022	Anthony McDonald	Inverness Caledonian Thistle	Edinburgh City	Free
7 January 2022	Mason Hancock	Aberdeen	Stirling Albion	Loan
7 January 2022	Robbie Crawford	Motherwell	Partick Thistle	Free
7 January 2022	Liam Shaw	Celtic	Motherwell	Loan
7 January 2022	Josh Jack	St Mirren	Albion Rovers	Loan
8 January 2022	Dante Polvara	Georgetown Hoyas	Aberdeen	Free
8 January 2022	Johnny Kenny	Sligo Rovers	Celtic	Undisclosed
10 January 2022	Jamie Brandon	Heart of Midlothian	Greenock Morton	Loan
10 January 2022	Rocky Bushiri	Norwich City	Hibernian	Loan
10 January 2022	Viv Solomon-Otabor	St Johnstone	Rukh Lviv	Free
11 January 2022	Declan Drysdale	Coventry City	Ross County	Loan
11 January 2022	Jamie Walker	Heart of Midlothian	Bradford City	Loan
12 January 2022	Caleb Chukwuemeka	Aston Villa	Livingston	Loan
12 January 2022	Kevin Hanratty	Aberdeen	Elgin City	Loan
12 January 2022	Jay Chapman	Inter Miami	Dundee	Free
12 January 2022	Ryan Gondoh	Wealdstone	Ayr United	Free
12 January 2022	Stephen Kelly	Rangers	Salford City	Loan
12 January 2022	Sam Denham	St Johnstone	Cowdenbeath	Loan
12 January 2022	Jermain Defoe	Rangers	Sunderland	Free
12 January 2022	Leo Watson	Heart of Midlothian	East Fife	Loan
13 January 2022	Daniel MacKay	Hibernian	Kilmarnock	Loan
13 January 2022	Shea Gordon	Partick Thistle	Queen of the South	Loan
13 January 2022	Kieran Wright	Rangers	Dumbarton	Loan
14 January 2022	Kai Kennedy	Rangers	Hamilton Academical	Loan
14 January 2022	Ash Taylor	Walsall	Kilmarnock	Free
14 January 2022	Kerr Smith	Dundee United	Aston Villa	Undisclosed
14 January 2022	Craig Wighton	Dunfermline Athletic	Arbroath	Loan
14 January 2022	Kayne Ramsay	Southampton	Ross County	Loan
14 January 2022	Ben Stirling	Hamilton Academical	Edinburgh City	Loan
14 January 2022	Jordan Roberts	Heart of Midlothian	Motherwell	Free
17 January 2022	Tony Watt	Motherwell	Dundee United	£100,000
17 January 2022	Harry Stone	Heart of Midlothian	Albion Rovers	Loan
17 January 2022	Ronald Hernández	Aberdeen	Atlanta United	Undisclosed
18 January 2022	Ivan Konovalov	Rubin Kazan	Livingston	Free
18 January 2022	Alex Greive	Birkenhead United	St Mirren	Free
18 January 2022	Mark Connolly	Dundee United	Dundalk	Loan
19 January 2022	Conor Hazard	Celtic	HJK Helsinki	Loan
19 January 2022	Mark Reynolds	Dundee United	Cove Rangers	Free
20 January 2022	Dylan Tait	Hibernian	Kilmarnock	Loan
20 January 2022	Matt O'Riley	MK Dons	Celtic	£1.5 million
20 January 2022	Tom Grivosti	Ross County	St Patrick's Athletic	Undisclosed
21 January 2022	Martin Boyle	Hibernian	Al-Faisaly	£3 million
21 January 2022	Armand Gnanduillet	Heart of Midlothian	Le Mans	Free
21 January 2022	Kyle Lafferty	Anorthosis Famagusta	Kilmarnock	Free
21 January 2022	Jaze Kabia	Livingston	Falkirk	Loan
21 January 2022	Adam Hutchinson	Dundee United	Dumbarton	Loan
21 January 2022	Sam Pearson	Bristol City	Inverness Caledonian Thistle	Loan
21 January 2022	Logan Chalmers	Dundee United	Inverness Caledonian Thistle	Loan
23 January 2022	John Mahon	Sligo Rovers	St Johnstone	Undisclosed
23 January 2022	Jason Cummings	Dundee	Central Coast Mariners	Free
24 January 2022	Vicente Besuijen	ADO Den Haag	Aberdeen	Undisclosed
24 January 2022	Kyle MacDonald	Dunfermline Athletic	Airdrieonians	Loan
24 January 2022	Cammy MacPherson	St Mirren	St Johnstone	Undisclosed
24 January 2022	Demetri Mitchell	Blackpool	Hibernian	Undisclosed
24 January 2022	Joe Chalmers	Ayr United	Dunfermline Athletic	Undisclosed
24 January 2022	Ben Dempsey	Charlton Athletic	Ayr United	Loan
24 January 2022	Niall McGinn	Aberdeen	Dundee	Free
24 January 2022	Paul Watson	Dunfermline Athletic	Falkirk	Free
25 January 2022	Lee O'Connor	Celtic	Tranmere Rovers	Free
25 January 2022	Victor Nirennold	UiTM	Motherwell	Free
25 January 2022	Lewis Jamieson	St Mirren	Clyde	Loan
26 January 2022	Sebastian Soto	Norwich City	Livingston	Loan
26 January 2022	Sam Folarin	Middlesbrough	Queen of the South	Loan
26 January 2022	Ellis Simms	Everton	Heart of Midlothian	Loan
27 January 2022	Amad	Manchester United	Rangers	Loan
27 January 2022	Juninho Bacuna	Rangers	Birmingham City	Undisclosed
27 January 2022	Brody Paterson	Celtic	Airdrieonians	Loan
27 January 2022	Steve Lawson	Livingston	Hamilton Academical	Free
27 January 2022	Joe Hardy	Accrington Stanley	Inverness Caledonian Thistle	Loan
27 January 2022	Michael Mullen	Kilmarnock	Stranraer	Loan
27 January 2022	Toby Sibbick	Barnsley	Heart of Midlothian	Undisclosed
27 January 2022	Bobby Kamwa	Leeds United	Dunfermline Athletic	Loan
27 January 2022	Blaise Riley-Snow	Raith Rovers	Alloa Athletic	Loan
28 January 2022	Melker Hallberg	Hibernian	St Johnstone	Free
28 January 2022	Jeando Fuchs	Dundee United	Peterborough United	Undisclosed
28 January 2022	Nick McAllister	Ayr United	Clyde	Loan
28 January 2022	Austin Samuels	Wolverhampton Wanderers	Inverness Caledonian Thistle	Free
28 January 2022	Darragh O'Connor	Motherwell	Queen of the South	Loan
28 January 2022	Joseph Efford	Waasland-Beveren	Motherwell	Undisclosed
28 January 2022	Darren Watson	Dundee United	East Fife	Loan
28 January 2022	Michael Garrity	Greenock Morton	Annan Athletic	Loan
28 January 2022	Peter Urminský	St Mirren	Stenhousemuir	Loan
29 January 2022	Keaghan Jacobs	Livingston	Falkirk	Loan
29 January 2022	Sam Ashford	Crawley Town	Ayr United	Loan
29 January 2022	Tomas Brindley	Kilmarnock	Forfar Athletic	Loan
30 January 2022	Ryan Hedges	Aberdeen	Blackburn Rovers	Undisclosed
30 January 2022	Iain Wilson	Dunfermline Athletic	Greenock Morton	Free
31 January 2022	Kyle McAllister	St Mirren	Partick Thistle	Loan
31 January 2022	Jordan Jones	Wigan Athletic	St Mirren	Loan
31 January 2022	Alex Gogic	Hibernian	St Mirren	Loan
31 January 2022	Blaine Rowe	Coventry City	Ayr United	Loan
31 January 2022	Kerr McInroy	Celtic	Ayr United	Loan
31 January 2022	Innes Cameron	Kilmarnock	Queen of the South	Loan
31 January 2022	Mateusz Żukowski	Lechia Gdańsk	Rangers	Undisclosed
31 January 2022	Aaron Ramsey	Juventus	Rangers	Loan
31 January 2022	Jacob Stolarczyk	Leicester City	Dunfermline Athletic	Loan
31 January 2022	Zak Rudden	Partick Thistle	Dundee	Loan
31 January 2022	Zeno Ibsen Rossi	AFC Bournemouth	Dundee	Loan
31 January 2022	Vontae Daley-Campbell	Leicester City	Dundee	Loan
31 January 2022	Alex Jakubiak	Dundee	Partick Thistle	Loan
31 January 2022	Tim Akinola	Arsenal	Dundee United	Loan
31 January 2022	Louis Appéré	Dundee United	Northampton Town	Undisclosed
31 January 2022	Theo Bair	Vancouver Whitecaps	St Johnstone	Undisclosed
31 January 2022	Tom Sang	Cardiff City	St Johnstone	Loan
31 January 2022	Runar Hauge	FK Bodø/Glimt	Hibernian	Free
31 January 2022	Sam Ford	Felixstowe & Walton United	Arbroath	Free
31 January 2022	Adam Montgomery	Celtic	Aberdeen	Loan
31 January 2022	Steven Warnock	Kilmarnock	Forfar Athletic	Loan
31 January 2022	Tomas Brindley	Kilmarnock	Forfar Athletic	Loan
31 January 2022	Sylvester Jasper	Fulham	Hibernian	Loan
31 January 2022	David Goodwillie	Clyde	Raith Rovers	Free
1 February 2022	Dylan Reid	St Mirren	Queen's Park	Loan
1 February 2022	Kevin McDonald	Fulham	Dundee United	Free
2 February 2022	Declan Glass	Dundee United	Kilmarnock	Loan
3 February 2022	Dean Campbell	Aberdeen	Kilmarnock	Loan
4 February 2022	Efe Ambrose	St Johnstone	Dunfermline Athletic	Loan
7 February 2022	Eetu Vertainen	St Johnstone	Linfield	Loan
8 February 2022	Leigh Griffiths	Celtic	Falkirk	Free
12 February 2022	Sean Mackie	Hibernian	Raith Rovers	Loan
12 February 2022	Andy Firth	Rangers	Partick Thistle	Loan
14 February 2022	Josh Sims	Southampton	Ross County	Free
15 February 2022	Brandon Barker	Rangers	Reading	Free
22 February 2022	Boli Bolingoli	Celtic	Ufa	Loan
28 February 2022	Juan Alegría	Rangers	Partick Thistle	Loan
28 February 2022	Ross MacIver	Partick Thistle	Alloa Athletic	Loan
28 February 2022	Owain Fôn Williams	Dunfermline Athletic	Retired	Free
28 February 2022	Liam Polworth	Kilmarnock	Dunfermline Athletic	Loan
8 March 2022	Scott Brown	Aberdeen	Retired	Free
12 April 2022	Jay Emmanuel-Thomas	Aberdeen	Jamshedpur FC	Free
4 May 2022	Chris Mueller	Hibernian	Chicago Fire	Free

== See also ==
- List of Scottish football transfers summer 2021
- List of Scottish football transfers summer 2022
