= List of Scottish football transfers summer 2022 =

This is a list of Scottish football transfers, featuring at least one 2022–23 Scottish Premiership club or one 2022–23 Scottish Championship club, which were completed during the summer 2022 transfer window. The window officially opened on 10 June and closed on 1 September.

== List ==
Date	Name	Moving from	Moving to	Fee
5 May 2022	Markus Fjørtoft	Ayr United	Retired	Free
5 May 2022	Alex Kenyon	Ayr United	Chester	Free
9 May 2022	Richard Foster	Partick Thistle	Detroit City	Free
9 May 2022	Mark Russell	Greenock Morton	Galway United	Free
9 May 2022	Michael Ledger	Greenock Morton	Spennymoor Town	Free
14 May 2022	Jevan Anderson	Cove Rangers	Elgin City	Free
16 May 2022	Ben Dempsey	Charlton Athletic	Ayr United	Undisclosed
16 May 2022	Aaron Muirhead	Ayr United	Partick Thistle	Free
16 May 2022	Jack Baird	Ayr United	Greenock Morton	Free
17 May 2022	Jak Alnwick	St Mirren	Cardiff City	Free
17 May 2022	Matthew Millar	St Mirren	Macarthur	Free
17 May 2022	Dylan McGeouch	Aberdeen	Forest Green Rovers	Free
18 May 2022	Adrian Sporle	Dundee United	Free agent	Free
18 May 2022	Kevin McDonald	Dundee United	Exeter City	Free
18 May 2022	Max Biamou	Dundee United	Free agent	Free
19 May 2022	Alan Power	St Mirren	Kilmarnock	Free
20 May 2022	Mark O'Hara	Motherwell	St Mirren	Free
20 May 2022	Marvin Bartley	Livingston	Retired	Free
20 May 2022	Gary Maley	Livingston	Retired	Free
20 May 2022	Matej Poplatnik	Livingston	Ilirija 1911	Free
20 May 2022	Victor Nirennold	Motherwell	Gloucester City	Free
22 May 2022	Declan McDaid	Dundee	Bohemians	Free
22 May 2022	Christie Elliott	Dundee	Retired	Free
22 May 2022	Charlie Adam	Dundee	Retired	Free
23 May 2022	Daizen Maeda	Yokohama F. Marinos	Celtic	Undisclosed
24 May 2022	Cammy Gill	Cowdenbeath	Arbroath	Free
24 May 2022	Gavin Reilly	Livingston	Queen of the South	Free
24 May 2022	Ben Stirling	Hamilton Academical	Free agent	Free
25 May 2022	Keaghan Jacobs	Livingston	Arbroath	Free
25 May 2022	Ross MacIver	Partick Thistle	Alloa Athletic	Free
25 May 2022	Liam Henderson	Arbroath	Falkirk	Free
25 May 2022	Darren Lyon	Queen's Park	Kelty Hearts	Free
25 May 2022	Trevor Carson	Dundee United	St Mirren	Undisclosed
25 May 2022	Shaun Rooney	St Johnstone	Fleetwood Town	Free
25 May 2022	Darragh O'Connor	Motherwell	Greenock Morton	Free
26 May 2022	Chris Burke	Kilmarnock	Retired	Free
26 May 2022	Coll Donaldson	Ross County	Falkirk	Free
26 May 2022	Dylan Easton	Airdrieonians	Raith Rovers	Free
27 May 2022	Dom Thomas	Dunfermline Athletic	Queen's Park	Free
27 May 2022	David McKay	Raith Rovers	Queen of the South	Free
27 May 2022	Blair Spittal	Ross County	Motherwell	Free
27 May 2022	Liam Craig	St Johnstone	Retired	Free
27 May 2022	Nadir Ciftci	St Johnstone	Makedonikos	Free
27 May 2022	Jahmal Hector-Ingram	St Johnstone	Hastings United	Free
27 May 2022	Harry Nicolson	Inverness Caledonian Thistle	Finn Harps	Free
27 May 2022	Ryan Fyffe	Inverness Caledonian Thistle	Buckie Thistle	Free
31 May 2022	Esmaël Gonçalves	Sheikh Russel	Livingston	Free
31 May 2022	Stuart Morrison	Queen's Park	Queen of the South	Free
31 May 2022	Scott Brown	Peterhead	Raith Rovers	Free
1 June 2022	John Souttar	Heart of Midlothian	Rangers	Free
1 June 2022	Cedric Itten	Rangers	Young Boys	£1.5 million
1 June 2022	Jack McMillan	Livingston	Partick Thistle	Free
1 June 2022	Jonah Ayunga	Morecambe	St Mirren	Free
2 June 2022	P. J. Morrison	Motherwell	Falkirk	Free
2 June 2022	Iain Wilson	Greenock Morton	Queen of the South	Free
2 June 2022	Ronan Hughes	Hamilton Academical	East Kilbride	Free
3 June 2022	Dipo Akinyemi	Welling United	Ayr United	Free
3 June 2022	Craig Bryson	St Johnstone	Stenhousemuir	Free
3 June 2022	Andy Firth	Rangers	Connah's Quay Nomads	Free
4 June 2022	Colin Doyle	Kilmarnock	Bradford City	Free
5 June 2022	Kieran Shanks	Inverurie Loco Works	Arbroath	Undisclosed
6 June 2022	Kyle Benedictus	Raith Rovers	Dunfermline Athletic	Free
6 June 2022	Sam Ellis	St Mirren	Stranraer	Free
7 June 2022	Vasilis Barkas	Celtic	Utrecht	Loan
8 June 2022	Regan Charles-Cook	Ross County	KAS Eupen	Free
8 June 2022	Chris Hamilton	Heart of Midlothian	Dunfermline Athletic	Free
8 June 2022	Ylber Ramadani	MTK Budapest	Aberdeen	Undisclosed
8 June 2022	Momodou Bojang	Rainbow FC (Gambia)	Hibernian	Loan
9 June 2022	Bob McHugh	Queen's Park	East Kilbride	Free
9 June 2022	Rocky Bushiri	Norwich City	Hibernian	Undisclosed
9 June 2022	Kye Rowles	Central Coast Mariners	Heart of Midlothian	Undisclosed
9 June 2022	Lewis Neilson	Dundee United	Heart of Midlothian	Free
9 June 2022	Sean Mackie	Hibernian	Falkirk	Free
9 June 2022	Stephen McGinn	Kilmarnock	Falkirk	Free
9 June 2022	Gary Oliver	Greenock Morton	Falkirk	Free
9 June 2022	Callum Yeats	Queen's Park	Stenhousemuir	Loan
10 June 2022	Alan Forrest	Livingston	Heart of Midlothian	Free
10 June 2022	Cameron Carter-Vickers	Tottenham Hotspur	Celtic	£6 million
10 June 2022	Grant Savoury	Peterhead	Queen's Park	Free
10 June 2022	David Bangala	Pohronie	Ayr United	Free
12 June 2022	Mark Gallagher	Aberdeen	Formartine United	Free
12 June 2022	Jordan Northcott	St Johnstone	Brechin City	Free
13 June 2022	Steven Lawless	Dunfermline Athletic	Partick Thistle	Free
13 June 2022	Kerr McInroy	Celtic	Kilmarnock	Free
13 June 2022	Connor Murray	Partick Thistle	Queen of the South	Free
14 June 2022	Michael Ruth	Aberdeen	Queen of the South	Free
15 June 2022	Jair Tavares	Benfica	Hibernian	Undisclosed
15 June 2022	Dean Campbell	Aberdeen	Stevenage	Loan
16 June 2022	Sam Denham	St Johnstone	East Fife	Free
16 June 2022	Brian Schwake	Livingston	Greenock Morton	Loan
16 June 2022	Ross Millen	Scunthorpe United	Raith Rovers	Free
16 June 2022	Andrew Considine	Aberdeen	St Johnstone	Free
16 June 2022	Drey Wright	Hibernian	St Johnstone	Free
16 June 2022	Innes Murray	Hibernian	Edinburgh	Free
17 June 2022	Jason Naismith	Kilmarnock	Queen's Park	Free
17 June 2022	Kyle McAllister	St Mirren	Forest Green Rovers	Free
17 June 2022	Callum Hendry	St Johnstone	Salford City	Free
17 June 2022	Luca Connell	Celtic	Barnsley	Free
17 June 2022	Jordan Roberts	Motherwell	Stevenage	Free
17 June 2022	Toyosi Olusanya	Middlesbrough	St Mirren	Free
17 June 2022	Justin Amaluzor	Motherwell	Aldershot Town	Free
18 June 2022	Kyle McClelland	Rangers	Hibernian	Free
19 June 2022	Calvin Ramsay	Aberdeen	Liverpool	£4.2 million
19 June 2022	Steven Boyd	Alloa Athletic	Inverness Caledonian Thistle	Free
19 June 2022	Nathan Shaw	Fylde	Inverness Caledonian Thistle	Free
20 June 2022	Jai Quitongo	Queen's Park	Greenock Morton	Free
20 June 2022	Grant Gillespie	Queen's Park	Greenock Morton	Free
20 June 2022	Jayden Richardson	Nottingham Forest	Aberdeen	Undisclosed
20 June 2022	Zach Hemming	Middlesbrough	Kilmarnock	Loan
21 June 2022	Liam Scales	Celtic	Aberdeen	Loan
21 June 2022	Ryan Strain	Maccabi Haifa	St Mirren	Free
21 June 2022	Victor Loturi	Cavalry FC	Ross County	Undisclosed
21 June 2022	Yan Dhanda	Swansea City	Ross County	Free
21 June 2022	Benjamin Siegrist	Dundee United	Celtic	Free
21 June 2022	Reghan Tumilty	Raith Rovers	Hartlepool United	Free
21 June 2022	Tomas Brindley	Kilmarnock	Forfar Athletic	Free
21 June 2022	Mihai Popescu	Heart of Midlothian	Farul Constanta	Free
22 June 2022	Matt Macey	Hibernian	Luton Town	Undisclosed
22 June 2022	George Harmon	Oxford City	Ross County	Free
22 June 2022	Paul McGinn	Hibernian	Motherwell	Free
22 June 2022	Frankie Musonda	Raith Rovers	Ayr United	Free
22 June 2022	Michael Miller	Ayr United	Stenhousemuir	Free
23 June 2022	David Mitchell	Hibernian	Partick Thistle	Free
23 June 2022	Bojan Miovski	MTK Budapest	Aberdeen	£535,000
23 June 2022	Mouhamed Niang	Partick Thistle	Hartlepool United	Free
23 June 2022	Lewis Mayo	Rangers	Kilmarnock	Loan
23 June 2022	Justin Devenny	Kilmarnock	Airdrieonians	Free
24 June 2022	Euan Murray	Kilmarnock	Hartlepool United	Free
24 June 2022	Jake Hastie	Rangers	Hartlepool United	Undisclosed
25 June 2022	Élie Youan	St. Gallen	Hibernian	Loan
25 June 2022	Alex Cochrane	Brighton & Hove Albion	Heart of Midlothian	Undisclosed
25 June 2022	Ryan Strachan	Cove Rangers	Peterhead	Free
25 June 2022	Danny Strachan	Dundee	Peterhead	Free
25 June 2022	Ciaran McKenna	Partick Thistle	Queen of the South	Free
25 June 2022	Conor McCarthy	St Mirren	Barnsley	Free
26 June 2022	Declan Gallagher	Aberdeen	St Mirren	Free
26 June 2022	Owura Edwards	Bristol City	Ross County	Loan
26 June 2022	Loïc Damour	Heart of Midlothian	Versailles	Free
26 June 2022	George O'Connor	Kilmarnock	Stranraer	Free
27 June 2022	Jorge Grant	Peterborough United	Heart of Midlothian	Undisclosed
27 June 2022	Keanu Baccus	Western Sydney Wanderers	St Mirren	Free
27 June 2022	Kazeem Olaigbe	Southampton	Ross County	Loan
28 June 2022	Adam Montgomery	Celtic	St Johnstone	Loan
28 June 2022	Funso Ojo	Aberdeen	Port Vale	Free
28 June 2022	Jordy Hiwula	Doncaster Rovers	Ross County	Free
28 June 2022	Kevin Hanratty	Aberdeen	Forfar Athletic	Loan
28 June 2022	Max Ram	Wycombe Wanderers	Inverness Caledonian Thistle	Free
29 June 2022	Ben Purrington	Charlton Athletic	Ross County	Free
29 June 2022	Jayden Mitchell-Lawson	Swindon Town	Ayr United	Free
30 June 2022	Tom Rogic	Celtic	West Bromwich Albion	Free
30 June 2022	Alexandro Bernabei	Lanús	Celtic	£3.75 million
1 July 2022	Anton Dowds	Falkirk	Partick Thistle	Free
1 July 2022	Carlo Pignatiello	Livingston	Greenock Morton	Free
1 July 2022	Jamie Walker	Heart of Midlothian	Bradford City	Free
1 July 2022	Ewan Henderson	Celtic	Hibernian	Free
1 July 2022	David Marshall	Queens Park Rangers	Hibernian	Free
1 July 2022	Nohan Kenneh	Leeds United	Hibernian	Free
1 July 2022	Jamie Brandon	Heart of Midlothian	Livingston	Free
1 July 2022	Scott Bitsindou	Lierse	Livingston	Free
1 July 2022	Phillip Cancar	Western Sydney Wanderers	Livingston	Free
1 July 2022	Lewis Miller	Central Coast Mariners	Hibernian	Undisclosed
1 July 2022	Anthony Stewart	Wycombe Wanderers	Aberdeen	Free
1 July 2022	Aiden McGeady	Sunderland	Hibernian	Free
1 July 2022	Kelle Roos	Derby County	Aberdeen	Free
1 July 2022	Jota	Benfica	Celtic	£6.4 million
1 July 2022	Graham Carey	CSKA Sofia	St Johnstone	Free
1 July 2022	Dean McMaster	St Mirren	Airdrieonians	Loan
1 July 2022	Gerry McDonagh	Halifax Town	Cove Rangers	Free
1 July 2022	Harry Broun	Kilmarnock	Dumbarton	Free
1 July 2022	James Keatings	Raith Rovers	Forfar Athletic	Free
1 July 2022	Nir Bitton	Celtic	Maccabi Tel Aviv	Free
2 July 2022	George Oakley	Woking	Inverness Caledonian Thistle	Free
4 July 2022	Ryan Schiavone	Heart of Midlothian	East Fife	Free
4 July 2022	Finn Yeats	Aberdeen	Falkirk	Free
4 July 2022	Zak Delaney	West Bromwich Albion	Inverness Caledonian Thistle	Free
4 July 2022	Brody Paterson	Celtic	Hartlepool United	Free
5 July 2022	Jamie Murphy	Hibernian	St Johnstone	Free
5 July 2022	Liam Donnelly	Motherwell	Kilmarnock	Free
5 July 2022	Karamoko Dembélé	Celtic	Brest	Free
5 July 2022	Tyler French	Wrexham	Dundee	Undisclosed
5 July 2022	Jonny Ngandu	Coventry City	Hamilton Academical	Free
6 July 2022	Brandon Haunstrup	Kilmarnock	Cambridge United	Free
6 July 2022	Ross Doohan	Celtic	Tranmere Rovers	Undisclosed
6 July 2022	Evan Towler	Aberdeen	Cove Rangers	Loan
6 July 2022	Jake Eastwood	Sheffield United	Ross County	Loan
7 July 2022	Steven Fletcher	Stoke City	Dundee United	Free
7 July 2022	Dylan Levitt	Manchester United	Dundee United	Undisclosed
7 July 2022	Antonio Colak	PAOK	Rangers	£1.8 million
7 July 2022	Daniel Fosu	Thatcham Town	Arbroath	Free
7 July 2022	Kieran MacDonald	Hamilton Academical	Edinburgh	Free
7 July 2022	Michael Doyle	Queen's Park	Hamilton Academical	Free
7 July 2022	Jaze Kabia	Livingston	Greenock Morton	Loan
7 July 2022	Ola Adeyemo	Cove Rangers	Peterhead	Free
8 July 2022	Murray Miller	Rangers	Alloa Athletic	Loan
8 July 2022	Jay Hogarth	Rangers	Alloa Athletic	Loan
8 July 2022	Alex Kirk	Arsenal	Ayr United	Loan
8 July 2022	Peter Grant	Queen's Park	Clyde	Free
8 July 2022	Brian McLean	Greenock Morton	Clyde	Free
8 July 2022	Tom Lawrence	Derby County	Rangers	Free
8 July 2022	Daniel MacKay	Hibernian	Inverness Caledonian Thistle	Loan
8 July 2022	Euan Deveney	Kilmarnock	Airdrieonians	Free
8 July 2022	Kirk Broadfoot	Inverness Caledonian Thistle	Open Goal Broomhill	Free
9 July 2022	Joe Aribo	Rangers	Southampton	£6 million
9 July 2022	Dylan Bahamboula	Oldham Athletic	Livingston	Free
9 July 2022	Patrick Jarrett	Stoke City	Queen's Park	Free
9 July 2022	Jack Newman	Dundee United	Peterhead	Loan
9 July 2022	Cody McLeod	Motherwell	Peterhead	Free
10 July 2022	Liam Fontaine	Dundee	Edinburgh	Free
11 July 2022	Jack Brydon	Hibernian	Edinburgh	Loan
11 July 2022	Josh Morris	Salford City	Motherwell	Free
11 July 2022	Craig Sibbald	Livingston	Dundee United	Free
12 July 2022	Rabbi Matondo	Schalke 04	Rangers	Undisclosed
12 July 2022	Lewis Ferguson	Aberdeen	Bologna	£3 million
12 July 2022	Willie Muir	Queen's Park	Alloa Athletic	Free
12 July 2022	Ethan Mitchell	Celtic	Annan Athletic	Free
12 July 2022	Finlay Gray	St Mirren	Dumbarton	Free
12 July 2022	Tony Weston	Rangers	Partick Thistle	Loan
13 July 2022	Josh Doig	Hibernian	Verona	£3 million
13 July 2022	Callum Johnson	Portsmouth	Ross County	Free
13 July 2022	Cole McKinnon	Rangers	Partick Thistle	Loan
13 July 2022	Joe Wright	Doncaster Rovers	Kilmarnock	Free
13 July 2022	Aidan Fitzpatrick	Queen of the South	Partick Thistle	Free
13 July 2022	Marijan Cabraja	Dinamo Zagreb	Hibernian	Undisclosed
14 July 2022	Kaiyne Woolery	Motherwell	Sakaryaspor	Undisclosed
14 July 2022	Kai Kennedy	Rangers	Falkirk	Loan
15 July 2022	Luís Lopes	Benfica	Aberdeen	Undisclosed
15 July 2022	Malik Tillman	Bayern Munich	Rangers	Loan
15 July 2022	Calum Butcher	Dundee United	Burton Albion	Free
15 July 2022	Ben Williamson	Rangers	Dundee	Loan
17 July 2022	William Akio	Valour FC	Ross County	Free
18 July 2022	Aaron McEneff	Heart of Midlothian	Perth Glory	Undisclosed
18 July 2022	Jacob Butterfield	St Johnstone	Scunthorpe United	Free
19 July 2022	Jordan Jones	Wigan Athletic	Kilmarnock	Loan
19 July 2022	Moritz Jenz	Lorient	Celtic	Loan
19 July 2022	Aaron Mooy	Shanghai Port	Celtic	Free
19 July 2022	Josh Cooper	Greenock Morton	Stirling Albion	Free
19 July 2022	Lawton Green	Motherwell	Greenock Morton	Free
19 July 2022	Tom Ritchie	Aberdeen	Queen of the South	Loan
19 July 2022	Ben Davies	Liverpool	Rangers	£3 million
20 July 2022	Calvin Bassey	Rangers	Ajax	£19.58 million
20 July 2022	Lawrence Shankland	Beerschot	Heart of Midlothian	Undisclosed
20 July 2022	Jack Hamilton	Livingston	Hartlepool United	Loan
21 July 2022	Mark Birighitti	Central Coast Mariners	Dundee United	Undisclosed
21 July 2022	Juan Alegria	Rangers	Falkirk	Loan
21 July 2022	Ryan Alebiosu	Arsenal	Kilmarnock	Loan
21 July 2022	Danny Mullen	Dundee	Partick Thistle	Free
21 July 2022	James Maxwell	Rangers	Doncaster Rovers	Free
21 July 2022	Harrison Clark	Livingston	Stirling Albion	Loan
22 July 2022	Gary Woods	Aberdeen	Kilmarnock	Free
22 July 2022	Ryan McGowan	Kuwait SC	St Johnstone	Free
23 July 2022	Shamal George	Colchester United	Livingston	Undisclosed
23 July 2022	Josh McPake	Rangers	Queen's Park	Loan
25 July 2022	Ridvan Yilmaz	Besiktas	Rangers	£3.4 million
25 July 2022	Callum Roberts	Notts County	Aberdeen	Undisclosed
26 July 2022	William Sandford	IFK Gothenburg	St Johnstone	Free
26 July 2022	Hayden Coulson	Middlesbrough	Aberdeen	Loan
26 July 2022	Christophe Berra	Raith Rovers	Retired	Free
27 July 2022	Lewis Jamieson	St Mirren	Airdrieonians	Loan
27 July 2022	Remi Matthews	Crystal Palace	St Johnstone	Loan
27 July 2022	Alex Mitchell	Millwall	St Johnstone	Loan
27 July 2022	Runar Hauge	Hibernian	Dundalk	Loan
27 July 2022	Aziz Behich	Giresunspor	Dundee United	Free
28 July 2022	Ben Wylie	Celtic	Airdrieonians	Loan
28 July 2022	Dan Cleary	St Johnstone	Shamrock Rovers	Free
28 July 2022	Mason Hancock	Aberdeen	Arbroath	Loan
28 July 2022	Alex Ferguson	St Johnstone	East Fife	Loan
28 July 2022	Ross Sinclair	St Johnstone	Montrose	Loan
28 July 2022	Rory McAllister	Cove Rangers	Montrose	Free
28 July 2022	Matthew Wright	Ross County	Montrose	Loan
28 July 2022	Adam Mackinnon	Ross County	Montrose	Loan
28 July 2022	Kieran Ngwenya	Aberdeen	Raith Rovers	Loan
28 July 2022	Mark Connolly	Dundee United	Derry City	Undisclosed
29 July 2022	Ryan Nolan	Northampton Town	Raith Rovers	Free
29 July 2022	Kyle Connell	Kilmarnock	Raith Rovers	Loan
29 July 2022	Glenn Middleton	Rangers	Dundee United	Undisclosed
29 July 2022	EJ Johnson	Hibernian	Edinburgh	Loan
29 July 2022	Kyle Jacobs	Greenock Morton	Edinburgh	Loan
29 July 2022	Finn Robson	Dundee United	Kelty Hearts	Loan
29 July 2022	Max Gillies	Queen's Park	Peterhead	Loan
30 July 2022	Murray Johnson	Hibernian	Airdrieonians	Loan
30 July 2022	Zach Robinson	Wimbledon	Dundee	Loan
3 August 2022	Jamie McGrath	Wigan Athletic	Dundee United	Loan
4 August 2022	Shayden Morris	Fleetwood Town	Aberdeen	Undisclosed
4 August 2022	Luis Longstaff	Liverpool	Cove Rangers	Free
5 August 2022	Joaõ Baldé	Hibernian	East Fife	Loan
5 August 2022	Allan Delferriere	Hibernian	Edinburgh	Loan
5 August 2022	Tom Findlay	Dundee	Elgin City	Loan
5 August 2022	Jeriel Dorsett	Reading	Kilmarnock	Loan
5 August 2022	Stephen Eze	Solin	Queen's Park	Free
5 August 2022	Deri Corfe	Tucson	Arbroath	Free
5 August 2022	Connor O'Riordan	Crewe Alexandra	Raith Rovers	Loan
6 August 2022	Martin Boyle	Al Faisaly	Hibernian	Undisclosed
6 August 2022	Leighton Clarkson	Liverpool	Aberdeen	Loan
6 August 2022	Chris Mochrie	Dundee United	Dunfermline Athletic	Loan
6 August 2022	Greig Young	Raith Rovers	Elgin City	Loan
6 August 2022	Jean-Pierre Tiehi	Fulham	Hamilton Academical	Loan
6 August 2022	Cammy Logan	Heart of Midlothian	Kelty Hearts	Loan
6 August 2022	Ryan Gondoh	Ayr United	Sevenoaks Town	Free
8 August 2022	David Moyo	Hamilton Academical	Barrow	Free
9 August 2022	Deji Sotona	Nice	Kilmarnock	Free
9 August 2022	Jack Simpson	Rangers	Cardiff City	Undisclosed
9 August 2022	Joe Grayson	Barrow	Dundee	Loan
9 August 2022	Steven Bell	Partick Thistle	Kelty Hearts	Free
10 August 2022	Daniel Phillips	Watford	St Johnstone	Free
11 August 2022	Malachi Boateng	Crystal Palace	Queen's Park	Loan
12 August 2022	Scott McGill	Heart of Midlothian	Kelty Hearts	Loan
12 August 2022	Lee Hodson	Kilmarnock	Partick Thistle	Loan
12 August 2022	Stephen Hendrie	Partick Thistle	Queen of the South	Free
12 August 2022	Adam Hutchinson	Dundee United	Montrose	Loan
13 August 2022	Cieran Dunne	Sunderland	Cove Rangers	Free
13 August 2022	Regan Thomson	Newcastle United	Hamilton Academical	Free
13 August 2022	Aston Oxborough	Norwich City	Motherwell	Free
13 August 2022	Ewan Murray	Dundee	Peterhead	Loan
13 August 2022	Jack Wilkie	Dundee	Peterhead	Loan
13 August 2022	Robbie Scullion	Partick Thistle	Peterhead	Free
16 August 2022	Charlie Gilmour	St Johnstone	Cove Rangers	Loan
16 August 2022	Taylor Steven	St Johnstone	East Fife	Loan
16 August 2022	Lewis Nicolson	Inverness Caledonian Thistle	Elgin City	Loan
16 August 2022	Sam Fisher	Dundee	Dunfermline Athletic	Loan
17 August 2022	Scott Allan	Hibernian	Arbroath	Free
17 August 2022	Stuart McKinstry	Leeds United	Motherwell	Loan
18 August 2022	Max Stryjek	Livingston	Wycombe Wanderers	Undisclosed
18 August 2022	Robbie Crawford	Partick Thistle	Greenock Morton	Free
19 August 2022	Alex Gogić	Hibernian	St Mirren	Free
19 August 2022	Jack Hamilton	Greenock Morton	Livingston	Free
20 August 2022	Johnny Kenny	Celtic	Queen's Park	Loan
23 August 2022	Christopher Jullien	Celtic	Montpellier HSC	Undisclosed
24 August 2022	Dario Zanatta	Raith Rovers	Hamilton Academical	Undisclosed
25 August 2022	Sead Hakšabanović	Rubin Kazan	Celtic	Undisclosed
25 August 2022	Ben Chrisene	Aston Villa	Kilmarnock	Loan
25 August 2022	Sadat Anaku	Kampala CC	Dundee United	Free
25 August 2022	Matt Penney	Ipswich Town	Motherwell	Loan
26 August 2022	Ryan Schofield	Huddersfield Town	Hibernian	Loan
26 August 2022	Leon Balogun	Rangers	Queens Park Rangers	Free
26 August 2022	Michael Devlin	Aberdeen	Fleetwood Town	Free
26 August 2022	Kai Fotheringham	Dundee United	Stirling Albion	Loan
28 August 2022	Orestis Kiomourtzoglou	Heracles Almelo	Heart of Midlothian	Undisclosed
29 August 2022	Kurtis Guthrie	RoundGlass Punjab	Livingston	Free
30 August 2022	Rolando Aarons	Huddersfield Town	Motherwell	Loan
31 August 2022	Christian Doidge	Hibernian	Kilmarnock	Loan
31 August 2022	Luke Donnelly	Arbroath	Alloa Athletic	Free
31 August 2022	Josh Mullin	Livingston	Ayr United	Loan
31 August 2022	Nicky Clark	Dundee United	St Johnstone	Undisclosed
1 September 2022	David Boateng	Crystal Palace	Queen's Park	Loan
1 September 2022	David Devine	Motherwell	Alloa Athletic	Loan
1 September 2022	Marcel Oakley	Birmingham City	Arbroath	Loan
1 September 2022	Dylan Tait	Hibernian	Arbroath	Loan
1 September 2022	Kareem Isiaka	Free agent	Arbroath	Free
1 September 2022	Brad Young	Aston Villa	Ayr United	Loan
1 September 2022	Oliver Abildgaard	Rubin Kazan	Celtic	Loan
1 September 2022	Ross Draper	Cove Rangers	Elgin City	Free
1 September 2022	Lucas de Bolle	Newcastle United	Hamilton Academical	Loan
1 September 2022	Stephen Humphrys	Wigan Athletic	Heart of Midlothian	Loan
1 September 2022	Will Fish	Manchester United	Hibernian	Loan
1 September 2022	Mykola Kukharevych	Troyes	Hibernian	Loan
1 September 2022	Harry McKirdy	Swindon Town	Hibernian	Undisclosed
1 September 2022	Stephen Kelly	Rangers	Livingston	Undisclosed
1 September 2022	Louis Moult	Burton Albion	Motherwell	Loan
1 September 2022	Tom Ritchie	Aberdeen	Peterhead	Loan
1 September 2022	Scott Fox	Motherwell	Queen of the South	Loan
1 September 2022	Connor McLennan	Aberdeen	St Johnstone	Loan
1 September 2022	David Bates	Aberdeen	Mechelen	Undisclosed

== See also ==
- List of Scottish football transfers winter 2021–22
- List of Scottish football transfers winter 2022–23
