= List of Scottish football transfers summer 2021 =

This is a list of Scottish football transfers, featuring at least one 2021–22 Scottish Premiership club or one 2021–22 Scottish Championship club, which were completed during the summer 2021 transfer window. The summer window for transfers in Scotland ran from 9 June to 31 August.

== List ==
Date	Name	Moving from	Moving to	Fee
6 May 2021	Nicky Low	East Stirlingshire	Arbroath	Free
7 May 2021	Kris Doolan	Arbroath	Retired	Free
7 May 2021	Scott Gallacher	Arbroath	East Fife	Free
12 May 2021	Cristian Montaño	Port Vale	Livingston	Free
13 May 2021	Mark Whatley	Arbroath	Montrose	Free
14 May 2021	Matthew Shiels	Rangers	Hamilton Academical	Free
18 May 2021	Raffaele De Vita	Livingston	Lupa Roma	Free
19 May 2021	Nathan Thomas	Hamilton Academical	York City	Free
19 May 2021	Charlie Trafford	Hamilton Academical	Wrexham	Free
19 May 2021	Kevin Holt	Ermis Aradippou	Partick Thistle	Free
20 May 2021	Craig Moore	Ayr United	Darvel	Free
21 May 2021	Collin Quaner	St Mirren	Austria Klagenfurt	Free
24 May 2021	Sherwin Seedorf	Motherwell	Free agent	Free
25 May 2021	Cameron Salkeld	Greenock Morton	Ayr United	Free
25 May 2021	Diaguely Dabo	Kilmarnock	Angoulême	Free
25 May 2021	Ally Taylor	Kilmarnock	Alloa Athletic	Free
27 May 2021	Sean McGinty	Greenock Morton	Ayr United	Free
27 May 2021	Markus Fjørtoft	Greenock Morton	Ayr United	Free
27 May 2021	Nick McAllister	St Mirren	Ayr United	Free
27 May 2021	Connor Shields	Queen of the South	Motherwell	Free
27 May 2021	Callum Morris	Ross County	Morpeth Town	Free
27 May 2021	Mohamed Maouche	Ross County	Free agent	Free
27 May 2021	Tony Andreu	Ross County	Sant Julià	Free
29 May 2021	Jordon Forster	Dundee	Kelty Hearts	Free
29 May 2021	Blair Lyons	Partick Thistle	Montrose	Loan
30 May 2021	Liam Henderson	Edinburgh City	Arbroath	Free
31 May 2021	Kyle Turner	Dunfermline Athletic	Partick Thistle	Free
31 May 2021	Zdenek Zlamal	Heart of Midlothian	Retired	Free
31 May 2021	Ross MacIver	Motherwell	Partick Thistle	Free
1 June 2021	Sam Roscoe	Ayr United	Linfield	Free
1 June 2021	Euan Murray	Dunfermline Athletic	Kilmarnock	Free
1 June 2021	Guy Melamed	St Johnstone	Bnei Sakhnin	Free
1 June 2021	Craig Conway	St Johnstone	Free agent	Free
1 June 2021	Aaron Steele	St Johnstone	East Fife	Free
1 June 2021	Cammy Gill	Dunfermline Athletic	Cowdenbeath	Free
1 June 2021	Luke McCowan	Ayr United	Dundee	Free
1 June 2021	Ryan Williamson	Partick Thistle	Falkirk	Free
1 June 2021	Joe Cardle	Partick Thistle	Kelty Hearts	Free
2 June 2021	Jamie Barjonas	Rangers	Kelty Hearts	Free
2 June 2021	Nicke Kabamba	Kilmarnock	Northampton Town	Free
2 June 2021	Olly Lee	Heart of Midlothian	Gillingham	Free
2 June 2021	Daniel Armstrong	Raith Rovers	Kilmarnock	Free
2 June 2021	Clevid Dikamona	Kilmarnock	Caen	Free
2 June 2021	Scott Tiffoney	Livingston	Partick Thistle	Swap
2 June 2021	James Penrice	Partick Thistle	Livingston	Swap
2 June 2021	Charles Dunne	Motherwell	St Mirren	Free
2 June 2021	Tommy Goss	Queen of the South	Annan Athletic	Free
3 June 2021	Blair Alston	Falkirk	Kilmarnock	Free
3 June 2021	Ross Callachan	Hamilton Academical	Ross County	Free
3 June 2021	Osman Sow	Dundee	Sukhothai	Free
3 June 2021	Kyle Fleming	Dundee	Annan Athletic	Free
3 June 2021	Brad McKay	Inverness Caledonian Thistle	Falkirk	Free
3 June 2021	Tom Parkes	Exeter City	Livingston	Free
3 June 2021	Scott Robinson	Livingston	Kilmarnock	Free
3 June 2021	Jack Sanders	Wigan Athletic	Kilmarnock	Free
3 June 2021	Steven Whittaker	Dunfermline Athletic	Retired	Free
4 June 2021	Aidan Nesbitt	Greenock Morton	Falkirk	Free
4 June 2021	Alan Lithgow	Livingston	Greenock Morton	Free
7 June 2021	Chris Long	Motherwell	Crewe Alexandra	Free
7 June 2021	Chris Millar	Greenock Morton	East Kilbride	Free
7 June 2021	Curtis Main	Shrewsbury Town	St Mirren	Free
7 June 2021	Greg Kiltie	Kilmarnock	St Mirren	Free
7 June 2021	Scott Tanser	St Johnstone	St Mirren	Free
7 June 2021	Stephen McGinn	Hibernian	Kilmarnock	Free
7 June 2021	Harry Robinson	Motherwell	Clyde	Free
7 June 2021	Aidan Connolly	Falkirk	Raith Rovers	Free
7 June 2021	Liam Dick	Alloa Athletic	Raith Rovers	Free
8 June 2021	Devante Cole	Motherwell	Barnsley	Free
8 June 2021	Greg Stewart	Rangers	Jamshedpur	Free
8 June 2021	Tom Walsh	Ayr United	Inverness Caledonian Thistle	Free
8 June 2021	Mitch Pinnock	Kilmarnock	Northampton Town	Free
9 June 2021	Aaron Martin	Hamilton Academical	Port Vale	Free
10 June 2021	Paul McKay	Airdrieonians	Queen of the South	Free
10 June 2021	Josh Todd	Falkirk	Queen of the South	Free
10 June 2021	Roberto Nditi	Forfar Athletic	Queen of the South	Free
10 June 2021	Adam Lewis	Liverpool	Livingston	Loan
10 June 2021	Chris Stokes	Forest Green Rovers	Kilmarnock	Free
11 June 2021	Steven Bell	East Kilbride	Partick Thistle	Free
11 June 2021	Ally Roy	Airdrieonians	Queen of the South	Free
11 June 2021	Craig McGuffie	Greenock Morton	Falkirk	Free
11 June 2021	Ryan Shanley	Hibernian	Edinburgh City	Loan
11 June 2021	Rhys McCabe	Queen of the South	Airdrieonians	Free
11 June 2021	Calum Antell	Edinburgh City	Arbroath	Free
11 June 2021	Joe McKee	Queen of the South	Dumbarton	Free
11 June 2021	Kieran MacDonald	Raith Rovers	Hamilton Academical	Free
12 June 2021	Gregor Buchanan	Queen of the South	Dumbarton	Free
12 June 2021	Kalvin Orsi	Greenock Morton	Dumbarton	Free
12 June 2021	Carl Tremarco	Ross County	Retired	Free
14 June 2021	Teddy Jenks	Brighton & Hove Albion	Aberdeen	Loan
15 June 2021	Brian Schwake	Livingston	Edinburgh City	Loan
15 June 2021	Allan Campbell	Motherwell	Luton Town	Undisclosed
15 June 2021	Dylan Connolly	St Mirren	Northampton Town	Free
15 June 2021	Charlie Mulgrew	Blackburn Rovers	Dundee United	Free
15 June 2021	Nikolay Todorov	Inverness Caledonian Thistle	Dunfermline Athletic	Free
16 June 2021	Ryan Sweeney	Mansfield Town	Dundee	Free
16 June 2021	Steven Naismith	Heart of Midlothian	Retired	Free
17 June 2021	Jason Naismith	Ross County	Kilmarnock	Free
17 June 2021	Fraser Murray	Hibernian	Kilmarnock	Undisclosed
17 June 2021	Brad Lyons	Blackburn Rovers	Kilmarnock	Free
17 June 2021	Josh Ginnelly	Preston North End	Heart of Midlothian	Free
17 June 2021	Billy Mckay	Ross County	Inverness Caledonian Thistle	Free
17 June 2021	Manny Duku	Raith Rovers	Inverness Caledonian Thistle	Free
17 June 2021	Reece McAlear	Norwich City	Inverness Caledonian Thistle	Loan
17 June 2021	Michael Gardyne	Ross County	Inverness Caledonian Thistle	Free
17 June 2021	Lyall Cameron	Dundee	Peterhead	Loan
17 June 2021	Josh Mulligan	Dundee	Peterhead	Loan
17 June 2021	Ilkay Durmus	St Mirren	Lechia Gdańsk	Free
18 June 2021	Colin Doyle	Heart of Midlothian	Kilmarnock	Free
18 June 2021	Joey Dawson	Scunthorpe United	Celtic	Undisclosed
20 June 2021	Jake Davidson	Dundee United	Queen's Park	Free
20 June 2021	Kyle Lafferty	Kilmarnock	Anorthosis Famagusta	Free
21 June 2021	Zach Hemming	Middlesbrough	Kilmarnock	Loan
21 June 2021	Alan Power	Kilmarnock	St Mirren	Undisclosed
21 June 2021	Lewis Moore	Heart of Midlothian	Queen's Park	Free
21 June 2021	Justin Amaluzor	Maidstone United	Motherwell	Free
22 June 2021	Andy Irving	Heart of Midlothian	Türkgücü München	Undisclosed
22 June 2021	George Oakley	Kilmarnock	Woking	Free
22 June 2021	Kaiyne Woolery	Tranmere Rovers	Motherwell	Free
22 June 2021	Jack Gurr	Atlanta United	Aberdeen	Free
22 June 2021	Callum Yeats	Hibernian	Queen's Park	Free
22 June 2021	Mark Russell	Finn Harps	Greenock Morton	Free
22 June 2021	Aidan McAdams	Greenock Morton	Ayr United	Free
22 June 2021	Alex Ferguson	St Johnstone	Edinburgh City	Loan
22 June 2021	Ethan Ross	Aberdeen	Raith Rovers	Free
23 June 2021	Regan Hendry	Raith Rovers	Forest Green Rovers	Free
23 June 2021	Iain Vigurs	Ross County	Cove Rangers	Free
23 June 2021	Ross Draper	Ross County	Cove Rangers	Free
23 June 2021	Deniz Mehmet	Dundee United	Dunfermline Athletic	Free
23 June 2021	Liam Polworth	Motherwell	Kilmarnock	Free
23 June 2021	Ruari Paton	Stranraer	Queen of the South	Free
23 June 2021	Lee Connelly	Sunderland	Queen of the South	Free
23 June 2021	Josh Rae	Peterhead	Queen of the South	Free
23 June 2021	Iain Davidson	Raith Rovers	Brechin City	Free
24 June 2021	Jon Guthrie	Livingston	Northampton Town	Free
25 June 2021	Dylan Paterson	Bo'ness Athletic	Arbroath	Free
25 June 2021	Kyle Gourlay	Hamilton Academical	Cove Rangers	Free
25 June 2021	Mark Gallagher	Aberdeen	Forfar Athletic	Loan
25 June 2021	Armstrong Okoflex	Celtic	West Ham United	Free
25 June 2021	Junior Morias	St Mirren	King's Lynn Town	Free
26 June 2021	Jack Hendry	Celtic	KV Oostende	£1.75 million
26 June 2021	Jermaine Hylton	Ross County	Newport County	Free
28 June 2021	David Gray	Hibernian	Retired	Free
28 June 2021	Christian Ramirez	Houston Dynamo	Aberdeen	£180,000
28 June 2021	Gozie Ugwu	Raith Rovers	Greenock Morton	Free
28 June 2021	Andy Ryan	Stirling Albion	Hamilton Academical	Free
28 June 2021	Joe Hilton	Blackburn Rovers	Hamilton Academical	Loan
28 June 2021	Alex Cochrane	Brighton & Hove Albion	Heart of Midlothian	Loan
29 June 2021	Michael MacFarlane	St Johnstone	Edinburgh City	Free
29 June 2021	Jon Obika	St Mirren	Morecambe	Free
29 June 2021	Dominic Samuel	Gillingham	Ross County	Free
30 June 2021	Adam King	Dundee United	Alloa Athletic	Free
30 June 2021	Jake Doyle-Hayes	St Mirren	Hibernian	Free
30 June 2021	Ofir Marciano	Hibernian	Feyenoord	Free
30 June 2021	Hayden Muller	Millwall	St Johnstone	Loan
1 July 2021	Ross Graham	Dundee United	Dunfermline Athletic	Loan
1 July 2021	Tomi Adeloye	Barnet	Ayr United	Free
1 July 2021	James Brown	Millwall	St Johnstone	Free
1 July 2021	Tom Lang	Clyde	Raith Rovers	Free
1 July 2021	Dario Zanatta	Ayr United	Raith Rovers	Free
1 July 2021	Christophe Berra	Heart of Midlothian	Raith Rovers	Free
1 July 2021	Eamonn Brophy	Kilmarnock	St Mirren	Free
1 July 2021	Scott Brown	Celtic	Aberdeen	Free
1 July 2021	Tommie Hoban	Aberdeen	Crewe Alexandra	Free
1 July 2021	James Keatings	Inverness Caledonian Thistle	Raith Rovers	Free
1 July 2021	Nnamdi Ofoborh	Bournemouth	Rangers	Free
1 July 2021	Craig Wighton	Heart of Midlothian	Dunfermline Athletic	Free
1 July 2021	Jamie Murphy	Rangers	Hibernian	Free
1 July 2021	Paul McMullan	Dundee United	Dundee	Free
1 July 2021	Liam Shaw	Sheffield Wednesday	Celtic	£300,000
1 July 2021	Osaze Urhoghide	Sheffield Wednesday	Celtic	£200,000
1 July 2021	Declan Gallagher	Motherwell	Aberdeen	Free
1 July 2021	Ross Stewart	Livingston	Heart of Midlothian	Free
1 July 2021	Daniel MacKay	Inverness Caledonian Thistle	Hibernian	Undisclosed
1 July 2021	Fashion Sakala	Oostende	Rangers	Free
1 July 2021	Ayo Obileye	Queen of the South	Livingston	Free
1 July 2021	Gary Woods	Oldham Athletic	Aberdeen	Free
1 July 2021	Jay Emmanuel-Thomas	Livingston	Aberdeen	Free
1 July 2021	Bruce Anderson	Aberdeen	Livingston	Free
1 July 2021	Daniel Finlayson	Rangers	St Mirren	Undisclosed
1 July 2021	Josh McPake	Rangers	Morecambe	Loan
2 July 2021	Gary Dicker	Kilmarnock	Brighton & Hove Albion	Free
2 July 2021	Danny Strachan	Dundee	Peterhead	Loan
2 July 2021	Daniel Barden	Norwich City	Livingston	Loan
2 July 2021	Reece Devine	Manchester United	St Johnstone	Loan
2 July 2021	Jake Vokins	Southampton	Ross County	Loan
2 July 2021	Kevin van Veen	Scunthorpe United	Motherwell	Free
2 July 2021	Dan Pybus	Queen of the South	Dunfermline Athletic	Free
2 July 2021	Yusuf Hussain	Motherwell	Forfar Athletic	Free
3 July 2021	Matej Poplatnik	Livingston	Raith Rovers	Loan
3 July 2021	Calum Ferrie	Dundee	Queen's Park	Free
5 July 2021	John Lundstram	Sheffield United	Rangers	Free
5 July 2021	Alexander Robertson	Manchester City	Ross County	Loan
5 July 2021	Jackson Irvine	Hibernian	FC St. Pauli	Free
5 July 2021	Liam Kelly	Queens Park Rangers	Motherwell	Free
6 July 2021	Aaron Chapman	Motherwell	Gillingham	Free
6 July 2021	Ross Millen	Kilmarnock	Scunthorpe United	Free
6 July 2021	Jack Hamilton	Dundee	Greenock Morton	Free
6 July 2021	Matthew McDonald	Motherwell	Airdrieonians	Free
6 July 2021	Sam Walker	Reading	Kilmarnock	Free
7 July 2021	Ash Taylor	Aberdeen	Walsall	Free
8 July 2021	Trevor Carson	Motherwell	Dundee United	Undisclosed
8 July 2021	Salim Kouider-Aïssa	Livingston	Airdrieonians	Free
8 July 2021	Charlie Albionson	Warrington Town	Ayr United	Free
9 July 2021	Dapo Mebude	Rangers	Watford	Free
9 July 2021	Harry Stone	Heart of Midlothian	Partick Thistle	Loan
9 July 2021	Paddy Martin	Hibernian	Falkirk	Free
9 July 2021	Alex Cooper	Sligo Rovers	Queen of the South	Free
9 July 2021	Greg Leigh	Aberdeen	Morecambe	Free
10 July 2021	Vakoun Issouf Bayo	Celtic	Gent	Undisclosed
11 July 2021	Corey Panter	Luton Town	Dundee	Loan
11 July 2021	Aaron Tshibola	Kilmarnock	Gençlerbirliği	Free
12 July 2021	Kirk Broadfoot	Kilmarnock	Inverness Caledonian Thistle	Free
12 July 2021	Aaron McGowan	Kilmarnock	Northampton Town	Free
13 July 2021	Ben Williamson	Rangers	Livingston	Loan
13 July 2021	Darragh O'Connor	Leicester City	Motherwell	Free
13 July 2021	Harrison Clark	Chester-le-Street United	Livingston	Free
13 July 2021	Joel Nouble	Aldershot Town	Livingston	Free
13 July 2021	Harrison Clark	Livingston	Arbroath	Loan
13 July 2021	Joel Nouble	Livingston	Arbroath	Loan
13 July 2021	Carlo Pignatiello	Livingston	Dumbarton	Loan
13 July 2021	Cammy Williamson	Motherwell	Falkirk	Free
13 July 2021	Sam Muir	Motherwell	Dumbarton	Free
13 July 2021	David McGurn	Raith Rovers	Cowdenbeath	Free
13 July 2021	Luke Mahady	Raith Rovers	Cowdenbeath	Loan
13 July 2021	Lewis Spence	Scunthorpe United	Hamilton Academical	Free
13 July 2021	Sam Fisher	Dundee	Forfar Athletic	Loan
13 July 2021	Luke Strachan	Dundee	Forfar Athletic	Loan
14 July 2021	Vincent Angelini	Celtic	Watford	Free
14 July 2021	Liel Abada	Maccabi Petah Tikva	Celtic	£3.4 million
14 July 2021	Lewis Toshney	Inverness Caledonian Thistle	Edinburgh City	Free
14 July 2021	Dylan McGowan	Western Sydney Wanderers	Kilmarnock	Free
16 July 2021	Quinn Coulson	Raith Rovers	Cowdenbeath	Loan
16 July 2021	Bosun Lawal	Watford	Celtic	Undisclosed
16 July 2021	Kyogo Furuhashi	Vissel Kobe	Celtic	£4.5 million
16 July 2021	Michael Cunningham	Dundee	East Fife	Free
16 July 2021	Mich'el Parker	Unattached	Motherwell	Free
18 July 2021	Stevie Mallan	Hibernian	Yeni Malatyaspor	Undisclosed
19 July 2021	Ian Lawlor	Doncaster Rovers	Dundee	Free
19 July 2021	Cillian Sheridan	Wisła Płock	Dundee	Free
19 July 2021	Andrew Shinnie	Charlton Athletic	Livingston	Free
19 July 2021	Tom James	Hibernian	Leyton Orient	Free
20 July 2021	Mackenzie Lemon	Dundee United	Falkirk	Free
20 July 2021	Reece Cole	Queens Park Rangers	Dunfermline Athletic	Free
21 July 2021	Kristoffer Ajer	Celtic	Brentford	£13.5 million
21 July 2021	Gabby McGill	Dunfermline Athletic	Airdrieonians	Free
21 July 2021	Scott McGill	Heart of Midlothian	Airdrieonians	Loan
21 July 2021	Sean Kelly	Falkirk	Livingston	Free
21 July 2021	Carl Starfelt	Rubin Kazan	Celtic	£4 million
22 July 2021	Sam Foley	Motherwell	Tranmere Rovers	Free
22 July 2021	Kai Kennedy	Rangers	Dunfermline Athletic	Loan
22 July 2021	Lewis Jamieson	St Mirren	Inverness Caledonian Thistle	Loan
22 July 2021	David Cancola	Slovan Liberec	Ross County	Free
22 July 2021	Chris Hamilton	Heart of Midlothian	Arbroath	Loan
22 July 2021	Marian Shved	Celtic	KV Mechelen	Undisclosed
22 July 2021	Cammy Smith	Indy Eleven	Partick Thistle	Free
23 July 2021	Elliott Frear	Heart of Midlothian	Bath City	Free
24 July 2021	Callum Slattery	Southampton	Motherwell	Undisclosed
24 July 2021	Harry Cochrane	Heart of Midlothian	Queen of the South	Undisclosed
26 July 2021	Rhys Breen	Rangers	Dunfermline Athletic	Free
26 July 2021	Ethon Varian	Stoke City	Raith Rovers	Loan
26 July 2021	Kai Fotheringham	Dundee United	Raith Rovers	Loan
27 July 2021	Jevan Anderson	Burton Albion	Cove Rangers	Free
27 July 2021	George Edmundson	Rangers	Ipswich Town	£750,000
27 July 2021	Shay Logan	Aberdeen	Cove Rangers	Free
27 July 2021	Lewis Mayo	Rangers	Partick Thistle	Loan
27 July 2021	James Maxwell	Rangers	Ayr United	Loan
27 July 2021	Jack Thomson	Rangers	Queen's Park	Loan
27 July 2021	Fernandy Mendy	Raith Rovers	Alloa Athletic	Free
27 July 2021	Graham Dorrans	Western Sydney Wanderers	Dunfermline Athletic	Free
28 July 2021	Daire O'Connor	Cliftonville	Ayr United	Free
29 July 2021	Beni Baningime	Everton	Heart of Midlothian	Undisclosed
29 July 2021	Juhani Ojala	Vejle	Motherwell	Undisclosed
30 July 2021	John Robertson	St Johnstone	Edinburgh City	Free
30 July 2021	Thomas O'Ware	Partick Thistle	Kelty Hearts	Free
30 July 2021	Rumarn Burrell	Middlesbrough	Kilmarnock	Loan
31 July 2021	Marios Ogkmpoe	Hamilton Academical	Athlitiki Enosi Larissa	Free
2 August 2021	Jonathan Afolabi	Celtic	Ayr United	Loan
2 August 2021	Harry Clarke	Arsenal	Ross County	Loan
3 August 2021	Connor Barron	Aberdeen	Kelty Hearts	Loan
3 August 2021	Ben Finnan	St Johnstone	Kelty Hearts	Free
3 August 2021	Joe Hart	Tottenham Hotspur	Celtic	Undisclosed
3 August 2021	James McCarthy	Crystal Palace	Celtic	Free
3 August 2021	Hakeem Odoffin	Hamilton Academical	Rotherham United	Undisclosed
4 August 2021	Jordan Jones	Rangers	Wigan Athletic	Undisclosed
4 August 2021	Ross Doohan	Celtic	Tranmere Rovers	Loan
5 August 2021	Aidy White	Heart of Midlothian	Rochdale	Free
5 August 2021	Miko Virtanen	Aberdeen	Hamilton Academical	Free
6 August 2021	Jack Burroughs	Coventry City	Ross County	Loan
6 August 2021	Ashley Maynard-Brewer	Charlton Athletic	Ross County	Loan
6 August 2021	Glenn Middleton	Rangers	St Johnstone	Loan
6 August 2021	Ben Paton	Blackburn Rovers	Ross County	Free
6 August 2021	Jamie Semple	Motherwell	East Fife	Free
6 August 2021	Josh Mullin	Livingston	Hamilton Academical	Loan
7 August 2021	Kyle Connell	Kilmarnock	East Fife	Loan
7 August 2021	Danny Rogers	Kilmarnock	Oldham Athletic	Free
9 August 2021	Odin Bailey	Birmingham City	Livingston	Loan
11 August 2021	Lawrence Shankland	Dundee United	Beerschot	£1 million
12 August 2021	Dillon Powers	Dundee United	Orange County SC	Free
12 August 2021	Harry Panayiotou	Aldershot Town	Livingston	Free
13 August 2021	Marc McNulty	Reading	Dundee United	Loan
16 August 2021	Jake Hastie	Rangers	Partick Thistle	Loan
16 August 2021	Jimmy Knowles	Mansfield Town	Greenock Morton	Loan
16 August 2021	Danny Whitehall	Kilmarnock	Eastleigh	Free
17 August 2021	Andre Wright	Ayr United	Sligo Rovers	Free
17 August 2021	Anton Dowds	Falkirk	Arbroath	Loan
17 August 2021	Joseph Hungbo	Watford	Ross County	Loan
18 August 2021	Sol Brynn	Middlesbrough	Queen of the South	Loan
18 August 2021	Tunji Akinola	West Ham United	Partick Thistle	Free
19 August 2021	Juninho Bacuna	Huddersfield Town	Rangers	Undisclosed
20 August 2021	Dylan Levitt	Manchester United	Dundee United	Loan
20 August 2021	Ilmari Niskanen	Ingolstadt 04	Dundee United	Undisclosed
20 August 2021	James Scott	Hull City	Hibernian	Loan
21 August 2021	Josip Juranović	Legia Warsaw	Celtic	£2.5 million
23 August 2021	Austin Samuels	Wolverhampton Wanderers	Aberdeen	Loan
23 August 2021	Ben Woodburn	Liverpool	Heart of Midlothian	Loan
25 August 2021	Jack Baldwin	Bristol Rovers	Ross County	Free
26 August 2021	Sean Goss	Shrewsbury Town	Motherwell	Free
26 August 2021	Marley Watkins	Cardiff City	Aberdeen	Free
27 August 2021	Matty Longstaff	Newcastle United	Aberdeen	Loan
27 August 2021	Taylor Moore	Bristol City	Heart of Midlothian	Loan
27 August 2021	Liam Scales	Shamrock Rovers	Celtic	£500,000
27 August 2021	Luke Matheson	Wolverhampton Wanderers	Hamilton Academical	Loan
27 August 2021	Ben Liddle	Bristol Rovers	Queen of the South	Loan
28 August 2021	Stéphane Oméonga	Pescara	Livingston	Free
28 August 2021	Connor Smith	Heart of Midlothian	Queen's Park	Loan
29 August 2021	David Bates	Hamburg	Aberdeen	Undisclosed
30 August 2021	Scott Robertson	Celtic	Crewe Alexandra	Loan
31 August 2021	Ali Crawford	Bolton Wanderers	St Johnstone	Loan
31 August 2021	Lars Dendoncker	Brighton & Hove Albion	St Johnstone	Loan
31 August 2021	Cammy MacPherson	St Mirren	St Johnstone	Loan
31 August 2021	Ali McCann	St Johnstone	Preston North End	£1.2 million
31 August 2021	Jason Kerr	St Johnstone	Wigan Athletic	£600,000
31 August 2021	Leigh Griffiths	Celtic	Dundee	Loan
31 August 2021	Cedric Itten	Rangers	Greuther Furth	Loan
31 August 2021	Nikola Katić	Rangers	Hajduk Split	Loan
31 August 2021	Jordan Roberts	Heart of Midlothian	Motherwell	Loan
31 August 2021	Sondre Solholm Johansen	Mjøndalen	Motherwell	Free
31 August 2021	Ryan Christie	Celtic	Bournemouth	£2.5 million
31 August 2021	Cameron Devlin	Newcastle Jets FC	Heart of Midlothian	Undisclosed
31 August 2021	Mihai Popescu	Heart of Midlothian	Hamilton Academical	Loan
31 August 2021	Alex Samuel	Wycombe Wanderers	Ross County	Free
31 August 2021	Oli Shaw	Ross County	Kilmarnock	Undisclosed
31 August 2021	Connor Ronan	Wolverhampton Wanderers	St Mirren	Loan
31 August 2021	Nathan Wood	Middlesbrough	Hibernian	Loan
31 August 2021	David Mitchell	Clyde	Hibernian	Undisclosed
31 August 2021	Giorgos Giakoumakis	VVV-Venlo	Celtic	£2.5 million
31 August 2021	Odsonne Edouard	Celtic	Crystal Palace	£14 million
31 August 2021	Cameron Carter-Vickers	Tottenham Hotspur	Celtic	Loan
31 August 2021	Jota	Benfica	Celtic	Loan
31 August 2021	Scott McMann	Hamilton Academical	Dundee United	Undisclosed
31 August 2021	Jamie Robson	Dundee United	Lincoln City	Undisclosed
31 August 2021	Gavin Reilly	Livingston	Greenock Morton	Loan
31 August 2021	Oisin McEntee	Newcastle United	Greenock Morton	Loan
31 August 2021	Thomas Allan	Newcastle United	Greenock Morton	Loan
31 August 2021	Jaakko Oksanen	Brentford	Greenock Morton	Loan
31 August 2021	Dylan Tait	Raith Rovers	Hibernian	Undisclosed
31 August 2021	Dylan Tait	Hibernian	Raith Rovers	Loan

== See also ==
- List of Scottish football transfers winter 2020–21
- List of Scottish football transfers winter 2021–22
