= List of Scottish football transfers winter 2022–23 =

This is a list of Scottish football transfers featuring at least one 2022–23 Scottish Premiership club or one 2022–23 Scottish Championship club which were completed after the summer 2022 transfer window closed and before the end of the 2022–23 season.

== List ==
Date	Name	Moving from	Moving to	Fee
2 September 2022	James Craigen	Arbroath	Edinburgh	Free
2 September 2022	Jason Thomson	Arbroath	Kelty Hearts	Free
2 September 2022	Kieran Offord	St Mirren	Alloa Athletic	Loan
2 September 2022	Reece Lyon	Greenock Morton	Annan Athletic	Loan
2 September 2022	Zander Clark	St Johnstone	Heart of Midlothian	Free
2 September 2022	Michael Garrity	Greenock Morton	Dumbarton	Loan
2 September 2022	Connor McBride	Blackburn Rovers	Raith Rovers	Free
6 September 2022	Robert Snodgrass	Luton Town	Heart of Midlothian	Free
6 September 2022	Max Johnston	Motherwell	Cove Rangers	Loan
9 September 2022	Nicky Low	Arbroath	Kelty Hearts	Loan
12 September 2022	Kyle McClelland	Hibernian	Cove Rangers	Loan
12 September 2022	Liam Grimshaw	Motherwell	Greenock Morton	Free
22 September 2022	Ryan Mullen	Celtic	Clyde	Loan
23 September 2022	Jaden Ferguson	Heart of Midlothian	Forfar Athletic	Loan
23 September 2022	Cammy Ballantyne	St Johnstone	Montrose	Loan
29 September 2022	Scott Bitsindou	Livingston	Arbroath	Loan
30 September 2022	Jon Craig	Kilmarnock	Clyde	Loan
30 September 2022	Jack Sanders	Kilmarnock	Cove Rangers	Loan
30 September 2022	Logan Chalmers	Dundee United	Ayr United	Loan
30 September 2022	Michael Hewitt	Ayr United	Peterhead	Loan
30 September 2022	Liam Brown	Queen's Park	Stenhousemuir	Loan
30 September 2022	Luke Graham	Dundee	Albion Rovers	Loan
3 October 2022	Jay Chapman	Dundee	Colorado Springs Switchbacks	Free
6 October 2022	Derick Osei	AFC Wimbledon	Dundee	Free
7 October 2022	John Frederiksen	Amstetten	Raith Rovers	Free
8 October 2022	Dean Lyness	St Mirren	Airdrieonians	Free
15 October 2022	Arnaud Djoum	Apollon Limassol	Dundee United	Free
26 October 2022	Efe Ambrose	St Johnstone	Greenock Morton	Free
29 October 2022	Ryan Scully	Free agent	Hamilton Academical	Free
11 November 2022	Florent Hoti	Dundee United	Arbroath	Free
26 November 2022	Ryan Barrett	Newcastle United	Inverness Caledonian Thistle	Free
28 December 2022	Johnny Kenny	Celtic	Shamrock Rovers	Loan
30 December 2022	Jay Henderson	St Mirren	Inverness Caledonian Thistle	Loan
1 January 2023	Steven Bradley	Hibernian	Livingston	Undisclosed
1 January 2023	Yuki Kobayashi	Vissel Kobe	Celtic	Undisclosed
1 January 2023	Alistair Johnston	Montreal	Celtic	£3 million
1 January 2023	Shane Blaney	Sligo Rovers	Motherwell	Undisclosed
1 January 2023	Tomoki Iwata	Yokohama F. Marinos	Celtic	Loan
1 January 2023	Kyle Vassell	San Diego Loyal	Kilmarnock	Free
1 January 2023	Ben Stanway	Partick Thistle	Airdrieonians	Loan
1 January 2023	Aaron Reid	Turriff United	Aberdeen	Free
1 January 2023	Aaron Reid	Aberdeen	Elgin City	Loan
1 January 2023	Richard Taylor	Waterford	St Mirren	Free
2 January 2023	Calvin Miller	Chesterfield	Greenock Morton	Free
2 January 2023	Yasin Ben El-Mhanni	Harrow Borough	Arbroath	Free
2 January 2023	Joaõ Baldé	Hibernian	Arbroath	Free
2 January 2023	Sean Adarkwa	Queens Park Rangers	Arbroath	Free
2 January 2023	Daniel Fosu	Arbroath	Peterhead	Free
2 January 2023	Deri Corfe	Arbroath	Free agent	Free
2 January 2023	Kareem Isiaka	Arbroath	Free agent	Free
2 January 2023	Aaron Healy	Arthurlie	Queen's Park	Free
5 January 2023	Graeme Shinnie	Wigan Athletic	Aberdeen	Loan
5 January 2023	Patrik Myslovič	MŠK Žilina	Aberdeen	Loan
5 January 2023	Ryan Dow	Peterhead	Arbroath	Free
5 January 2023	Kyle Jacobs	Greenock Morton	Edinburgh	Free
5 January 2023	Darren Hynes	Greenock Morton	Clyde	Free
5 January 2023	Lewis McGregor	Greenock Morton	Airdrieonians	Free
6 January 2023	Declan Glass	Dundee United	Cove Rangers	Loan
6 January 2023	Kai Fotheringham	Dundee United	Stirling Albion	Loan
6 January 2023	Flynn Duffy	Dundee United	Stirling Albion	Loan
6 January 2023	Adam Hutchinson	Dundee United	Forfar Athletic	Loan
6 January 2023	Jacob Comerford	Dundee United	Cumbernauld Colts	Loan
6 January 2023	Kieran Shanks	Arbroath	Peterhead	Loan
6 January 2023	Steven Hetherington	Falkirk	Arbroath	Loan
6 January 2023	Luke Strachan	Dundee	Alloa Athletic	Loan
6 January 2023	Logan Ross	Ross County	Brora Rangers	Loan
6 January 2023	Andrew MacLeod	Ross County	Brora Rangers	Loan
7 January 2023	Dylan McGowan	Kilmarnock	Hamilton Academical	Loan
7 January 2023	Tom Sparrow	Stoke City	Hamilton Academical	Loan
9 January 2023	Brody Paterson	Hartlepool United	Cove Rangers	Loan
9 January 2023	Niall McGinn	Dundee	Glentoran	Free
9 January 2023	James Hill	AFC Bournemouth	Heart of Midlothian	Loan
10 January 2023	Ally Roy	Glentoran	Greenock Morton	Loan
10 January 2023	Yutaro Oda	Vissel Kobe	Heart of Midlothian	Undisclosed
11 January 2023	Evan Towler	Aberdeen	Elgin City	Loan
11 January 2023	Curtis Lyle	Kilmarnock	Stenhousemuir	Free
11 January 2023	Harry Hennem	Inverness Caledonian Thistle	Clachnacuddin	Loan
12 January 2023	Jack Brydon	Hibernian	Queen of the South	Free
12 January 2023	Kevin Dąbrowski	Hibernian	Queen of the South	Loan
12 January 2023	Garang Kuol	Newcastle United	Heart of Midlothian	Loan
12 January 2023	Ollie Crankshaw	Stockport County	Motherwell	Loan
12 January 2023	Jack Milne	Aberdeen	Kelty Hearts	Loan
13 January 2023	Nohan Kenneh	Hibernian	Ross County	Loan
13 January 2023	Callum Johnson	Ross County	Mansfield Town	Undisclosed
13 January 2023	John Mahon	St Johnstone	Sligo Rovers	Free
13 January 2023	Mikael Mandron	Gillingham	Motherwell	Free
13 January 2023	Finn Robson	Dundee United	Forfar Athletic	Loan
13 January 2023	Layton Bisland	Dundee United	Peterhead	Loan
13 January 2023	Ruairdh Adams	Dundee United	Gala Fairydean Rovers	Loan
13 January 2023	Tobi Oluwayemi	Celtic	Cork City	Loan
13 January 2023	Ben Woods	Burnley	Inverness Caledonian Thistle	Free
16 January 2023	Elias Melkersen	Hibernian	Sparta Rotterdam	Loan
16 January 2023	Luiyi de Lucas	Haka	Livingston	Free
16 January 2023	Logan Chalmers	Dundee United	Tranmere Rovers	Loan
16 January 2023	Derick Osei	Dundee	Free agent	Free
17 January 2023	Scott Fox	Motherwell	Cove Rangers	Free
18 January 2023	Gospel Ocholi	Partick Thistle	Gala Fairydean Rovers	Loan
19 January 2023	Kwame Thomas	Sutton United	Dundee	Loan
19 January 2023	Tony Weston	Rangers	Cove Rangers	Loan
19 January 2023	Christian Ramirez	Aberdeen	Columbus Crew	Undisclosed
20 January 2023	Aaron Arnott	Raith Rovers	Bonnyrigg Rose Athletic	Loan
20 January 2023	Scott McGill	Heart of Midlothian	Raith Rovers	Loan
20 January 2023	Scott Robertson	Celtic	Fleetwood Town	Free
20 January 2023	Matty Connelly	Motherwell	Stranraer	Loan
20 January 2023	Aly Riddle	Inverness Caledonian Thistle	Free agent	Free
21 January 2023	James Jeggo	Eupen	Hibernian	Undisclosed
21 January 2023	Aaron Brown	Kilmarnock	Stranraer	Loan
21 January 2023	Quinn Coulson	Raith Rovers	Alloa Athletic	Free
21 January 2023	Kian Speirs	Motherwell	Stenhousemuir	Loan
22 January 2023	Josip Juranović	Celtic	Union Berlin	£7.5 million
22 January 2023	Carljohan Eriksson	Dundee United	FC Nordsjælland	Loan
23 January 2023	Miko Virtanen	Hamilton Academical	Cove Rangers	Free
23 January 2023	Todd Cantwell	Norwich City	Rangers	£1.5 million
23 January 2023	Rhys Thomas	Cove Rangers	Formartine United	Free
24 January 2023	George Oakley	Inverness Caledonian Thistle	Greenock Morton	Free
24 January 2023	Andy Ryan	Hamilton Academical	Larne	Free
24 January 2023	Charlie McCann	Rangers	Forest Green Rovers	£350,000
24 January 2023	Dylan Stephenson	Newcastle United	Hamilton Academical	Loan
25 January 2023	Tunji Akinola	Partick Thistle	Free agent	Free
25 January 2023	Toyosi Olusanya	St Mirren	Arbroath	Loan
25 January 2023	Eamonn Brophy	St Mirren	Ross County	Loan
25 January 2023	Josh Stones	Wigan Athletic	Ross County	Loan
25 January 2023	Oh Hyeon-gyu	Suwon Samsung Bluewings	Celtic	£2.5 million
25 January 2023	Florent Hoti	Arbroath	Free agent	Free
26 January 2023	Jamie Masson	Cove Rangers	Free agent	Free
26 January 2023	Barry Maguire	Motherwell	Dundee	Loan
26 January 2023	Finn Ecrepont	Ayr United	Stranraer	Loan
26 January 2023	Matthew Wright	Ross County	Falkirk	Loan
26 January 2023	Archie Meekison	Dundee United	Falkirk	Loan
26 January 2023	Robbie Leitch	Cove Rangers	Kelty Hearts	Loan
26 January 2023	Demetri Mitchell	Hibernian	Exeter City	Free
26 January 2023	Kyle Connell	Kilmarnock	East Kilbride	Free
27 January 2023	Jason Naismith	Queen's Park	Cove Rangers	Free
27 January 2023	Ryan Porteous	Hibernian	Watford	£450,000
27 January 2023	Adam Mackinnon	Ross County	Montrose	Loan
27 January 2023	Euan Henderson	Heart of Midlothian	Queen's Park	Loan
27 January 2023	Ryan Clampin	Colchester United	Dundee	Loan
27 January 2023	Jaze Kabia	Livingston	Queen of the South	Loan
28 January 2023	Riku Danzaki	Consadole Sapporo	Motherwell	Free
28 January 2023	William Akio	Ross County	Raith Rovers	Loan
28 January 2023	Connor Smith	Heart of Midlothian	Hamilton Academical	Loan
28 January 2023	Stuart McKenzie	Cove Rangers	Peterhead	Free
29 January 2023	Mattie Pollock	Watford	Aberdeen	Loan
30 January 2023	CJ Egan-Riley	Burnley	Hibernian	Loan
30 January 2023	Alan Lithgow	Greenock Morton	East Kilbride	Free
30 January 2023	Luke Chambers	Liverpool	Kilmarnock	Loan
31 January 2023	Angus MacDonald	Swindon Town	Aberdeen	Free
31 January 2023	Dilan Markanday	Blackburn Rovers	Aberdeen	Loan
31 January 2023	Vicente Besuijen	Aberdeen	Excelsior Rotterdam	Loan
31 January 2023	Anthony Stewart	Aberdeen	MK Dons	Loan
31 January 2023	Jay Gorter	Ajax	Aberdeen	Loan
31 January 2023	Reece McAlear	Tranmere Rovers	Ayr United	Loan
31 January 2023	John Frederiksen	Raith Rovers	Free agent	Free
31 January 2023	Connor McAvoy	Fulham	Partick Thistle	Loan
31 January 2023	Kyle Lafferty	Kilmarnock	Linfield	Free
31 January 2023	Josh Mullin	Livingston	Ayr United	Free
31 January 2023	Oli Shaw	Kilmarnock	Barnsley	Undisclosed
31 January 2023	Nicolas Raskin	Standard Liege	Rangers	£1.75 million
31 January 2023	Zak Rudden	Dundee	St Johnstone	Loan
31 January 2023	Simon Murray	Queen's Park	Ross County	Undisclosed
31 January 2023	Gwion Edwards	Wigan Athletic	Ross County	Loan
31 January 2023	Thierry Small	Southampton	St Mirren	Loan
31 January 2023	Tony Watt	Dundee United	St Mirren	Loan
31 January 2023	Ethan Erhahon	St Mirren	Lincoln City	Undisclosed
31 January 2023	Matthew Hoppe	Middlesbrough	Hibernian	Loan
31 January 2023	EJ Johnson	Hibernian	Austin FC	Loan
31 January 2023	Sondre Solholm Johansen	Motherwell	Odds BK	Undisclosed
31 January 2023	Connor Shields	Motherwell	Queen's Park	Loan
31 January 2023	Lewis Banks	Sligo Rovers	Arbroath	Free
31 January 2023	Lorent Tolaj	Brighton & Hove Albion	Dundee	Loan
31 January 2023	Luke Hannant	Colchester United	Dundee	Loan
31 January 2023	Loick Ayina	Huddersfield Town	Dundee United	Loan
31 January 2023	Harrison Clark	Livingston	Gateshead	Free
31 January 2023	Jack Aitchison	Barnsley	Motherwell	Free
31 January 2023	James Furlong	Brighton & Hove Albion	Motherwell	Loan
31 January 2023	Jonathan Obika	Morecambe	Motherwell	Loan
31 January 2023	Zach Robinson	AFC Wimbledon	Dundee	Loan
31 January 2023	Michael Moffat	Ayr United	Glenafton Athletic	Loan
1 February 2023	Gary Woods	Kilmarnock	Exeter City	Free
1 February 2023	David Bangala	Ayr United	Cove Rangers	Loan
1 February 2023	Marcel Oakley	Birmingham City	Queen's Park	Loan
2 February 2023	Gerry McDonagh	Cove Rangers	Scunthorpe United	Free
3 February 2023	Cammy Logan	Heart of Midlothian	Queen of the South	Loan
3 February 2023	Dan Casey	Sacramento Republic	Motherwell	Free
3 February 2023	Gime Touré	Yeovil Town	Cove Rangers	Free
4 February 2023	Calum Butcher	Burton Albion	Motherwell	Free
4 February 2023	Calum Waters	Kilmarnock	Greenock Morton	Loan
4 February 2023	Paul Komolafe	Qizilqum Zarafshon	Arbroath	Free
7 February 2023	Phillip Cancar	Livingston	Newcastle Jets	Free
7 February 2023	Yosuke Ideguchi	Celtic	Avispa Fukuoka	Loan
8 February 2023	Giorgos Giakoumakis	Celtic	Atlanta United	£4.3 million
10 February 2023	Ivan Konovalov	Livingston	FC Tobol	Free
10 February 2023	Ewan Otoo	Celtic	Dunfermline Athletic	Loan
11 February 2023	Esmaël Gonçalves	Livingston	Raith Rovers	Loan
13 February 2023	Michael Devlin	Fleetwood Town	Hibernian	Free
14 February 2023	Robbie Hamilton	Hibernian	Stirling Albion	Loan
16 February 2023	Max Kucheriavyi	St Johnstone	Falkirk	Loan
16 February 2023	Dylan Reid	St Mirren	Crystal Palace	Undisclosed
17 February 2023	Nicky Low	Arbroath	Clydebank	Free
20 February 2023	Chris Maguire	Lincoln City	Ayr United	Free
21 February 2023	Paul McGowan	Dundee	Dunfermline Athletic	Loan
23 February 2023	Murray Johnson	Hibernian	Airdrieonians	Loan
24 February 2023	Ali Crawford	St Johnstone	Greenock Morton	Loan
24 February 2023	Michael O'Halloran	St Johnstone	Cove Rangers	Loan
25 February 2023	Jacob Blaney	Hibernian	Stenhousemuir	Loan
25 February 2023	Josh McCulloch	Hibernian	Albion Rovers	Loan
1 March 2023	Kanayo Megwa	Hibernian	Kelty Hearts	Loan
1 March 2023	Jackson Longridge	Livingston	Cove Rangers	Loan
15 March 2023	Caolan Boyd-Munce	Middlesbrough	St Mirren	Free

== See also ==
- List of Scottish football transfers summer 2022
- List of Scottish football transfers summer 2023
