= 2021–22 Kelty Hearts F.C. season =

Kelty Hearts
2021–22 season
- Chairman: Ian Thomson
- Manager: Kevin Thomson
- Stadium: New Central Park
- League Two: Winners
- League Cup: Group stage
- Challenge Cup: First Round South
- Scottish Cup: Fifth round
- Top goalscorer: League: Nathan Austin (17); All: Nathan Austin (21)
- Highest home attendance: 2,183 vs. St Johnstone, Scottish Cup, 22 January 2022
- Lowest home attendance: 392 vs. East Fife, League Cup, 17 July 2021
- Average home league attendance: 650
Home colours	Away colours

The 2021–22 season was Kelty Hearts' first season in the Scottish Professional Football League following their promotion from the Lowland Football League at the end of the 2020–21 season. Kelty participated in Scottish League Two and also competed in the League Cup, Challenge Cup and the Scottish Cup.

== Summary ==
This was Kelty Hearts' first season under the management of Kevin Thomson following the departure of Barry Ferguson, who had led the club to promotion the previous season.

Kelty entered the Scottish Cup at the second round and would eliminate then cup holders St Johnstone on their way to the fifth round before being eliminated by St Mirren. Kelty were declared champions 26 March with a victory over Albion Rovers, which secured the league title and back to back promotions to League One.

== Competitions ==
=== Results and fixtures ===
Win Draw Loss Postponed

=== Scottish League Two ===
31 July 2021 1	Kelty Hearts	2–0	Cowdenbeath	New Central Park
15:00 BST	Cardle 38'; Philp 69'	Report		Attendance: 1,202; Referee: Calum Scott

7 August 2021 2	Stirling Albion	1–3	Kelty Hearts	Forthbank Stadium
15:00 BST	Forster 67 o.g.'	Report	Forster 39'; Cardle 40'; Higginbotham 56'	Attendance: 601; Referee: Graham Grainger

14 August 2021 3	Forfar Athletic	2–2	Kelty Hearts	Station Park
15:00 BST	Aitken 17 pen.' Thomson 45+1'	Report	Austin 22', 64'	Attendance: 623; Referee: Chris Graham

21 August 2021 4	Kelty Hearts	1–0	Edinburgh City	New Central Park
15:00 BST	Barjonas 54'	Report		Attendance: 677; Referee: Steven Reid

28 August 2021 5	Stenhousemuir	1–4	Kelty Hearts	Station Park
15:00 BST	Brown 23'	Report	Agyeman 13', 71'; Cardle 33'; Barjonas 66'	Attendance: 436; Referee: Alan Newlands

11 September 2021 6	Kelty Hearts	1–1	Elgin City	New Central Park
15:00 BST	Higginbotham 90+3'	Report	MacPhee 30 pen.'	Attendance: 608; Referee: Lloyd Wilson

18 September 2021 7	Albion Rovers	0–3	Kelty Hearts	Cliftonhill
15:00 BST		Report	Austin 11', 20', 63'	Attendance: 427; Referee: Grant Irvine

25 September 2021 8	Kelty Hearts	1–0	Stranraer	New Central Park
15:00 BST	Austin 8'	Report		Attendance: 528; Referee: Stewart Luke

2 October 2021 9	Kelty Hearts	2–1	Annan Athletic	New Central Park
15:00 BST	Barjonas 37'; Higginbotham 74'	Report	Wallace 43'	Attendance: 674; Referee: Matthew MacDermid

15 October 2021 10	Edinburgh City	2–3	Kelty Hearts	Ainslie Park
15:00 BST	See 16'; Murray 88'	Report	Austin 22', 48'; Tidser 37'	Attendance: 726; Referee: Peter Stuart

30 October 2021 11	Kelty Hearts	1–1	Stirling Albion	New Central Park
15:00 BST	Cardle 62'	Report	Scally 65'	Attendance: 937; Referee: Ross Hardie

6 November 2021 12	Cowdenbeath	0–1	Kelty Hearts	Central Park
15:00 BST		Report	Cardle 76'	Attendance: 727; Referee: Iain Snedden

13 November 2021 13	Kelty Hearts	1–0	Forfar Athletic	New Central Park
15:00 BST	Agyeman 47'	Report		Attendance: 856; Referee: Chris Fordyce

20 November 2021 14	Kelty Hearts	2–0	Stenhousemuir	New Central Park
15:00 BST	Barron 7'; Cardle 50'	Report		Attendance: 571; Referee: Mike Roncone

11 December 2021 15	Kelty Hearts	6–1	Albion Rovers	New Central Park
15:00 BST	Austin 5', 48'; Finlayson 37'; Biabi 52', 75'; Barjonas 79'	Report	O'Donnell 27'	Attendance: 554; Referee: Graham Grainger

18 December 2021 16	Stranraer	0–4	Kelty Hearts	Stair Park
15:00 BST		Report	Burns 10 o.g.' Forster 42'; Austin 45+2', 54'	Attendance: 272; Referee: Lloyd Wilson

26 December 2021 17	Annan Athletic	5–1	Kelty Hearts	Galabank
15:00 BST	Moxon 44'; Garrity 46'; Wallace 76', 87', 90+1 pen.'	Report	Austin 36'; Forster (red card) 45'	Attendance: 372; Referee: Craig Napier

8 January 2022 18	Stirling Albion	0–3	Kelty Hearts	Forthbank Stadium
15:00 BST		Report	Austin 4'; Cardle 58', 78'	Attendance: 483; Referee: Chris Graham

15 January 2022 19	Kelty Hearts	2–2	Edinburgh City	New Central Park
15:00 BST	Cardle 27', 55'	Report	Handling 75'; Bryden 90+3'	Attendance: 500; Referee: Stewart Luke

25 January 2022 20	Elgin City	2–0	Kelty Hearts	Borough Briggs
19:45 BST	Hester 36', 75'	Report		Attendance: 531; Referee: Dan McFarlane

29 January 2022 21	Kelty Hearts	3–2	Stranraer	New Central Park
15:00 BST	O'Ware 21'; Barjonas 22'; Austin 89'	Report	Muir 53'; Hilton 56'	Attendance: 559; Referee: Barry Cook

5 February 2022 22	Kelty Hearts	4–0	Elgin City	New Central Park
15:00 BST	Higginbotham 8 pen.' Agyeman 29', 56'; Tidser 52'	Report		Attendance: 433; Referee: Grant Irvine

19 February 2022 23	Forfar Athletic	1–0	Kelty Hearts	Links Park
19:45 BST	Aitken 73'	Report		Attendance: 670; Referee: Alan Newlands

22 February 2022 24	Kelty Hearts	1–0	Cowdenbeath	New Central Park
19:45 BST	Higginbotham 82 pen.'	Report		Attendance: 1,092; Referee: Steven Kirkland

26 February 2022 25	Kelty Hearts	3–1	Annan Athletic	New Central Park
15:00 BST	Moxon 5 o.g.' Barjonas 16'; Cardle 72'	Report	McCartney 78'	Attendance: 617; Referee: Ross Hardie

5 March 2022 26	Cowdenbeath	0–1	Kelty Hearts	Central Park
15:00 BST		Report	Cardle 37'	Attendance: 475; Referee: Peter Stuart

8 March 2022 27	Stenhousemuir	0–1	Kelty Hearts	Ochilview Park
19:45 BST		Report	Austin 90+2'	Attendance: 475; Referee: Peter Stuart

12 March 2022 28	Kelty Hearts	3–1	Albion Rovers	New Central Park
15:00 BST	Austin 1'; Barjonas 36', 84'	Report	Wilson 59'	Attendance: 635; Referee: Duncan Williams

16 March 2022 29	Albion Rovers	0–0	Kelty Hearts	Cliftonhill
19:45 BST

19 March 2022 30	Elgin City	0–0	Kelty Hearts	Borough Briggs
15:00 BST	Omar (red card) 57'			Attendance: 733; Referee: Calum Scott

26 March 2022 31	Kelty Hearts	1–0	Albion Rovers	New Central Park
15:00 BST	Kucheriavyi 84'	Report		Attendance: 812; Referee: Chris Graham

1 April 2022 32	Elgin City	1–1	Kelty Hearts	Ainslie Park
19:45 BST	Shanley 66 pen.'	Report	Barjonas 48'	Attendance: 487; Referee: Matthew MacDermid

9 April 2022 33	Kelty Hearts	1–1	Stirling Albion	New Central Park
15:00 BST	Biabi 8'	Report	Moore 2'	Attendance: 519; Referee: Barry Cook

16 April 2022 34	Stranraer	0–3	Kelty Hearts	Stair Park
15:00 BST		Report	McNab 48'; Reilly 64'; Higginbotham 81'	Attendance: 301; Referee: Duncan Williams

23 April 2022 35	Kelty Hearts	1–1	Forfar Athletic	New Central Park
15:00 BST	Hill 31'	Report	Warnock 47'; McCluskey (red card) 50'	Attendance: 903; Referee: Calum Scott

30 April 2022 36	Annan Athletic	1–2	Kelty Hearts	Galabank
15:00 BST	Reilly 22 o.g.'	Report	Higginbotham 30'; Agyeman 45+1'	Attendance: 441; Referee: Barry Cook

=== Scottish League Cup ===
==== Group stage ====
Results

9 July 2021 Group stage	Kelty Hearts	0–1	Dundee United	Kelty
19:45		Report	Shankland 77'	Stadium: New Central Park; Attendance: 500; Referee: Steven McLean

17 July 2021 Group stage	Kelty Hearts	3–0	East Fife	Kelty
15:00	Austin 13', 25'; Agyeman 87'	Report		Stadium: New Central Park; Attendance: 392; Referee: Barry Cook

20 July 2021 Group stage	Elgin City	1–3	Kelty Hearts	Elgin
19:45	Little 5'	Report	Russell 52'; Austin 76', 87'	Stadium: Borough Briggs; Attendance: 220; Referee: Chris Fordyce

24 July 2021 Group stage	Arbroath	3–2	Kelty Hearts	Arbroath
15:00	Donnelly 31'; Hamilton 52'; Low 58 pen.'	Report	Higginbotham 20'; Cardle 27'	Stadium: Gayfield Park; Attendance: 626; Referee: Duncan Williams

=== Scottish Challenge Cup ===
10 August 2021 First Round South	St Mirren B	1–1 (3–0 p)	Kelty Hearts	Paisley
19:45	Jack 89 pen.'	Report	Tidser 70'	Stadium: St Mirren Park; Referee: Chris Graham

=== Scottish Cup ===
23 October 2021 Second round	Kelty Hearts	4–1	Buckie Thistle	Kelty
15:00	O'Ware 34'; Cardle 36', 77'; Philp 86'	Report	Urquhart 79'	Stadium: New Central Park; Attendance: 608; Referee: Steven Kirkland

27 November 2021 Third round	Kelty Hearts	0–0	Montrose	Kelty
15:00		Report		Stadium: New Central Park; Attendance: 805; Referee: Barry Cook

4 December 2021 Third round replay	Montrose	1–1 (1–3 p)	Kelty Hearts	Montrose
15:00	Johnston 42'	Report	Cardle 6'	Stadium: Links Park; Attendance: 690; Referee: Barry Cook

22 January 2022 Fourth round	Kelty Hearts	1–0 (a.e.t.)	St Johnstone	Kelty
15:00	Higginbotham 103'	Report		Stadium: New Central Park; Attendance: 2,183; Referee: Kevin Clancy

12 February 2022 Fifth round	St Mirren	4–0	Kelty Hearts	Paisley
15:00	Greive 15'; Jones 50'; Kiltie 58', 85'	Report		Stadium: St Mirren Park; Attendance: 3,398; Referee: Andrew Dallas

== Player statistics ==
=== Appearances and goals ===
As of 30 April 2022

No.	Pos	Player	League Two		League Cup		Challenge Cup		Scottish Cup		Total	
No.	Pos	Player	Apps	Goals	Apps	Goals	Apps	Goals	Apps	Goals	Apps	Goals
1	GK	(Scotland) Darren Jamieson	35+0	0	4+0	0	0+0	0	5+0	0	44	0
2	MF	(Scotland) Andrew Black	14+8	0	2+1	0	1+0	0	3+2	0	31	0
3	DF	(Scotland) Reis Peggie	1+2	0	4+0	0	1+0	0	0+0	0	8	0
4	DF	(Scotland) Dougie Hill	16+2	1	2+0	0	1+0	0	3+0	0	24	1
5	DF	(Scotland) Scott Hooper	11+2	0	0+0	0	1+0	0	1+1	0	16	0
6	DF	(Scotland) Jordon Forster	22+1	2	2+1	0	0+0	0	3+0	0	29	2
7	MF	(England) Joe Cardle	29+7	12	3+1	1	1+0	0	5+0	3	46	16
8	MF	(Scotland) Thomas Reilly	8+5	1	3+1	0	0+0	0	0+2	0	19	1
9	FW	(England) Nathan Austin	19+7	17	3+1	4	0+0	0	5+0	0	35	21
10	MF	(Scotland) Jamie Barjonas	31+0	9	3+1	0	0+1	0	3+2	0	41	9
11	MF	(England) Kallum Higginbotham	35+0	7	3+1	1	0+1	0	5+0	1	45	9
12	MF	(Scotland) Michael Tidser	31+1	2	4+0	0	1+0	1	5+0	0	42	3
14	MF	(Scotland) Ross Philp	18+14	1	4+0	0	0+1	0	5+0	1	42	2
15	DF	(Northern Ireland) Daniel Finlayson	19+4	1	0+0	0	0+0	0	4+0	0	27	1
16	MF	(Scotland) Robbie McNab	12+10	1	4+0	0	1+0	0	1+4	0	32	1
17	MF	(Ukraine) Max Kucheriavyi	9+4	1	0+0	0	0+0	0	0+0	0	13	1
19	MF	(Scotland) Connor Barron	12+1	1	0+0	0	1+0	0	0+0	0	14	1
19	MF	(England) Harrison Clark	1+2	0	0+0	0	0+0	0	0+0	0	3	0
20	GK	(Scotland) Josh Donaldson	1+0	0	0+0	0	1+0	0	0+0	0	2	0
21	FW	(Scotland) Botti Biabi	8+18	3	1+3	0	0+1	0	1+2	0	34	3
22	FW	(Italy) Alfredo Agyeman	15+19	6	1+3	1	1+0	0	1+3	0	43	7
23	DF	(Malawi) Kieran Ngwenya	22+3	0	0+0	0	0+0	0	2+0	0	27	0
25	DF	(Scotland) Thomas O'Ware	27+1	1	0+0	0	0+0	0	3+0	1	31	2
26	MF	(Scotland) Ben Finnan	0+1	0	0+0	0	0+1	0	0+0	0	2	0

== Team statistics ==
=== Competition overview ===
Competition	Starting round	Final position	Record							
Competition	Starting round	Final position	Pld	W	D	L	GF	GA	GD	Win %
Scottish League Two	Matchday 1	1st	36	24	9	3	68	28	+40	66.67
Scottish League Cup	Group stage	Group stage	4	2	0	2	8	5	+3	50.00
Scottish Challenge Cup	First round	First round	1	0	0	1	1	1	+0	0.00
Scottish Cup	Second round	Fifth round	5	3	1	1	6	6	+0	60.00
Total			46	29	10	7	83	40	+43	63.04

Source: Competitions

=== League table ===
Pos	Team	Pld	W	D	L	GF	GA	GD	Pts	Promotion, qualification or relegation
1	Kelty Hearts (C, P)	36	24	9	3	68	28	+40	81	Promotion to League One
2	Forfar Athletic	36	16	12	8	57	36	+21	60	Qualification for the League One play-offs
3	Annan Athletic	36	18	5	13	64	51	+13	59	Qualification for the League One play-offs
4	Edinburgh City (O, P)	36	14	10	12	43	49	−6	52	Qualification for the League One play-offs
5	Stenhousemuir	36	13	10	13	47	46	+1	49	

Rules for classification: 1) Points; 2) Goal difference; 3) Goals scored; 4) Head-to-to head points; 5) Head-to-head goal difference; 6) Play-off (only for deciding promotion, play-off participation and relegation).
(C) Champions; (O) Play-off winners; (P) Promoted

=== League Cup table ===
Pos	Team	Pld	W	PW	PL	L	GF	GA	GD	Pts	Qualification	DUN	ARB	KEL	ELG	EFI
1	Dundee United	4	4	0	0	0	9	1	+8	12	Qualification for the second round	—	1–0	—	6–1	—
2	Arbroath	4	3	0	0	1	6	3	+3	9	Qualification for the second round	—	—	3–2	—	2–0
3	Kelty Hearts	4	2	0	0	2	8	5	+3	6		0–1	—	—	—	3–0
4	Elgin City	4	1	0	0	3	5	12	−7	3		—	0–1	1–3	—	—
5	East Fife	4	0	0	0	4	2	9	−7	0		0–1	—	—	2–3	—

Rules for classification: 1) goal difference, 2) goals scored, 3) away goals scored, 4) matches won, 5) away matches won, 6) drawing of lots.

== Transfers ==
=== Players in ===
Player	From	Fee
(Scotland) Jordon Forster	(Scotland) Dundee	Free
(Scotland) Jamie Barjonas	(Scotland) Rangers	Free
(Scotland) Andrew Black	(Scotland) Edinburgh City	Free
(Scotland) Reis Peggie	(Scotland) East Stirlingshire	Free
(Italy) Alfredo Agyeman	(Scotland) BSC Glasgow	Free
(Scotland) Botti Biabi	(Scotland) Stenhousemuir	Free
(Scotland) Thomas O'Ware	(Scotland) Partick Thistle	Free
(Scotland) Ben Finnan	(Scotland) St Johnstone	Free

=== Players out ===
Player	To	Fee
(Scotland) Patrick Boyle	(Scotland) Dumbarton	Free
(Scotland) Dylan Easton	(Scotland) Airdrieonians	Free
(Scotland) Errol Douglas	(Scotland) Lothian Thistle Hutchison Vale	Free
(Scotland) Craig Reid	(Scotland) Darvel	Free

=== Loans in ===
Player	From	Fee
(Scotland) Connor Barron	(Scotland) Aberdeen	Loan
(Malawi) Kieran Ngwenya	(Scotland) Aberdeen	Loan
(Northern Ireland) Daniel Finlayson	(Scotland) St Mirren	Loan
(England) Harrison Clark	(Scotland) Livingston	Loan
(Ukraine) Max Kucheriavyi	(Scotland) St Johnstone	Loan

=== Loans out ===
Player	To	Fee
(Scotland) Reis Peggie	(Scotland) Bo'ness United	Loan
(Scotland) Scott Hooper	(Scotland) Annan Athletic	Loan
