= 2022–23 Falkirk F.C. season =

Falkirk
2022–23 season
- Manager: John McGlynn
- Stadium: Falkirk Stadium
- League One: 2nd
- Scottish Cup: Semi-final
- League Cup: Second round
- Challenge Cup: Fourth round
- Top goalscorer: League: Callumn Morrison (12); All: Callumn Morrison (15)
- Highest home attendance: 7,279 vs. Dunfermline Athletic, League One, 5 November 2022
- Lowest home attendance: 1,700 vs. Dundee, Challenge Cup, 8 December 2022
- Average home league attendance: 4,144
Home colours	Away colours

The 2022–23 season was Falkirk's fourth season in League One following their relegation from the Championship at the end of the 2018–19 season. Falkirk also competed in the League Cup, Challenge Cup and the Scottish Cup.

== Results and fixtures ==
Win Draw Loss Postponed

=== Pre Season ===
24 June 2022	Falkirk	1–4	Kilmarnock	Falkirk Stadium
19:30	McKay 22'		Taylor 9', 90'; Cameron 74', 81'

28 June 2022	Falkirk	1–0	Stranraer	Falkirk Stadium
19:30	Nesbitt 17'	Report

=== Scottish League One ===
30 July 2022 1	Falkirk	0–0	Montrose	Falkirk
15:00		Report		Stadium: Falkirk Stadium; Attendance: 3,682; Referee: Gavin Duncan

6 August 2022 2	Airdrieonians	4–0	Falkirk	Airdrie
15:00	Gallagher 21', 61'; McGill 85'; Kouider-Aïssa 89'	Report		Stadium: Excelsior Stadium; Attendance: 1,872; Referee: Lloyd Wilson

13 August 2022 3	Falkirk	3–1	Peterhead	Falkirk
15:00	Williamson 45+4'; Morrison 58'; Oliver 90'	Report	Gillies 45'; O'Keefe (red card) 84'	Stadium: Falkirk Stadium; Attendance: 3,426; Referee: Stewart Luke

20 August 2022 4	Edinburgh	0–3	Falkirk	Edinburgh
15:00		Report	Morrison 21'; Oliver 54'; Burrell 90'	Stadium: Meadowbank Stadium; Attendance: 789; Referee: Alan Newlands

27 August 2022 5	Falkirk	3–1	Queen of the South	Falkirk
15:00	Morrison 12'; Alegría 29'; Lawal 83'	Report	Paton 61' (pen.); McKay (red card) 84'	Stadium: Falkirk Stadium; Attendance: 3,884; Referee: Barry Cook

3 September 2022 6	Kelty Hearts	2–0	Falkirk	Kelty
15:00	Cardle 19'; McGill 26'	Report		Stadium: New Central Park; Attendance: 1,203; Referee: Mike Roncone

17 September 2022 7	Dunfermline Athletic	1–1	Falkirk	Dunfermline
15:00	Benedictus 55' (pen.)	Report	Morrison 30'	Stadium: East End Park; Attendance: 6,670; Referee: Chris Graham

1 October 2022 8	Falkirk	2–0	Clyde	Falkirk
15:00	McGinn 7', 19'	Report		Stadium: Falkirk Stadium; Attendance: 3,689; Referee: Graham Grainger

8 October 2022 9	Peterhead	0–4	Falkirk	Peterhead
15:00		Report	Morrison 41'; Alegría 67' (red card) 87'; Wilson 70' (o.g.); Henderson 82'	Stadium: Balmoor Stadium; Attendance: 722; Referee: Dan McFarlane

15 October 2022 10	Montrose	1–1	Falkirk	Montrose
15:00	Mackinnon 29'	Report	McGuffie 43'	Stadium: Links Park; Attendance: 1,032; Referee: Matthew MacDermid

18 October 2022 11	Falkirk	3–1	Alloa Athletic	Falkirk
19:45	McKay 3'; Alegría 7', 44'	Report	Sammon 86'	Stadium: Falkirk Stadium; Attendance: 3,287; Referee: Graham Beaton

22 October 2022 12	Falkirk	2–3	Kelty Hearts	Falkirk
15:00	Alegría 56'; Burrell 71'	Report	Agyeman 6', 8'; Lyon 66'	Stadium: Falkirk Stadium; Referee: Chris Fordyce

29 October 2022 13	Queen of the South	1–3	Falkirk	Dumfries
15:00	Murray 64'	Report	Burrell 6', 21'; Kennedy 48'	Stadium: Palmerston Park; Attendance: 1,366; Referee: Stewart Luke

5 November 2022 14	Falkirk	0–1	Dunfermline Athletic	Falkirk
15:00		Report	Wighton 60'	Stadium: Falkirk Stadium; Attendance: 7,279; Referee: Alan Newlands

12 November 2022 15	Falkirk	2–0	Edinburgh	Falkirk
15:00	Lawal 53'; McCann 84'	Report		Stadium: Falkirk Stadium; Attendance: 3,705; Referee: Steven Kirkland

19 November 2022 16	Clyde	3–3	Falkirk	Hamilton
15:00	Thicot 28'; Allan 41', 62'	Report	Morrison 21'; Oliver 54'; Lawal 68'	Stadium: New Douglas Park; Attendance: 1,393; Referee: Chris Fordyce

3 December 2022 17	Falkirk	1–1	Airdrieonians	Falkirk
15:00	Kennedy 26'	Report	Smith 78'	Stadium: Falkirk Stadium; Attendance: 3,874; Referee: Mike Roncone

23 December 2022 18	Falkirk	5–2	Queen of the South	Falkirk
19:45	Alegría 16'; Morrison 45', 86'; Burrell 79'; Henderson 83'	Report	Paton 21'; Wilson 23'	Stadium: Falkirk Stadium; Attendance: 3,907; Referee: Dan McFarlane

7 January 2023 19	Falkirk	2–1	Montrose	Falkirk
15:00	Nesbitt 32', 47'	Report	Waddell 90+5'	Stadium: Falkirk Stadium; Attendance: 3,742; Referee: Graham Beaton

14 January 2023 20	Falkirk	4–0	Clyde	Falkirk
15:00	Morrison 25', 88'; Donaldson (red card) 57'; McGinn 78'; Burrell 90+4'	Report	Hynes (red card) 74'	Stadium: Falkirk Stadium; Attendance: 3,771; Referee: Peter Stuart

28 January 2023 21	Edinburgh	1–2	Falkirk	Edinburgh
15:00	See 74'	Report	Oliver 52'; Morrison 58'	Stadium: Meadowbank Stadium; Attendance: 1,017; Referee: Steven Kirkland

4 February 2023 22	Kelty Hearts	1–2	Falkirk	Kelty
15:00	Higginbotham 32'	Report	Allan 79'; Burrell 90'	Stadium: New Central Park; Attendance: 1,290; Referee: Mike Roncone

7 February 2023 23	Alloa Athletic	1–1	Falkirk	Alloa
19:45	Taggart 90+5' (pen.)	Report	Oliver 86'	Stadium: Recreation Park; Attendance: 1,167; Referee: Calum Scott

18 February 2023 24	Falkirk	1–0	Alloa Athletic	Falkirk
15:00	Morrison 44'	Report		Stadium: Falkirk Stadium; Attendance: 4,061; Referee: Grant Irvine

25 February 2023 25	Airdrieonians	1–3	Falkirk	Airdrie
15:00	Gallagher 10'	Report	Oliver 44'; Kennedy 51', 72'	Stadium: Excelsior Stadium; Attendance: 1,167; Referee: Greg Aitken

4 March 2023 26	Falkirk	5–0	Peterhead	Falkirk
15:00	Kucheriavyi 59'; Donaldson 68'; McGuffie 79', 83', 90+3' (pen.)	Report		Stadium: Falkirk Stadium; Attendance: 4,344; Referee: Peter Stuart

7 March 2023 27	Dunfermline Athletic	2–0	Falkirk	Dunfermline
19:45	Breen 67'; Todd 75'	Report		Stadium: East End Park; Attendance: 9,530; Referee: Euan Anderson

18 March 2023 28	Queen of the South	1–0	Falkirk	Dumfries
15:00	Donaldson 39' (o.g.)	Report		Stadium: Palmerston Park; Attendance: 1,292; Referee: Barry Cook

24 March 2023 29	Falkirk	0–0	Kelty Hearts	Falkirk
19:45		Report		Stadium: Falkirk Stadium; Attendance: 3,707; Referee: Ross Hardie

1 April 2023 30	Clyde	0–0	Falkirk	Hamilton
15:00		Report		Stadium: New Douglas Park; Referee: Scott Lambie

8 April 2023 31	Falkirk	2–2	Dunfermline Athletic	Falkirk
15:00	Nesbitt 8'; Burrell 33'	Report	Wighton 35'; McCann 44'	Stadium: Falkirk Stadium; Attendance: 6,301; Referee: David Dickinson

11 April 2023 32	Montrose	1–2	Falkirk	Montrose
19:45	Milne 82'	Report	Kennedy 18', 24'	Stadium: Links Park; Attendance: 622; Referee: Calum Scott

15 April 2023 33	Falkirk	2–2	Airdrieonians	Falkirk
15:00	Kennedy 29'; Burrell 89'	Report	Gallagher 58', 63' (pen.)	Stadium: Falkirk Stadium; Attendance: 4,403; Referee: Graham Grainger

18 April 2023 34	Falkirk	1–2	Edinburgh	Falkirk
19:45	Kennedy 85'	Report	Handling 72'; Murray 90+2'	Stadium: Falkirk Stadium; Attendance: 3,825; Referee: Alan Newlands

22 April 2023 35	Alloa Athletic	1–4	Falkirk	Alloa
15:00	Scougall 55' (pen.)	Report	McKay 9'; Kennedy 15'; Henderson 58', 66'	Stadium: Recreation Park; Attendance: 1,364; Referee: Gavin Duncan

5 May 2023 36	Peterhead	1–3	Falkirk	Peterhead
15:00	MacIver 44'	Report	Wright 26'; Allan 56'; Lawal 58'	Stadium: Balmoor Stadium; Attendance: 684; Referee: Peter Stuart

==== Championship Play-off ====
9 May 2023 Semi-final 1st Leg	Airdrieonians	6–2	Falkirk	Airdrie
19:45	McCabe 14', 90+5' (pen.); Smith 16'; Taylor-Sinclair 31'; Fordyce 41'; Rae (red card) 65'; Devenny 88'	Report	Donaldson 61'; Kennedy 68'; Allan (red card) 90'	Stadium: Excelsior Stadium; Attendance: 3,272; Referee: Scott Lambie

13 May 2023 Semi-final 2nd Leg	Falkirk	0–1 (2–7 agg.)	Airdrieonians	Falkirk
15:00		Report	McGill 42'	Stadium: Falkirk Stadium; Attendance: 4,080; Referee: Euan Anderson

=== Scottish League Cup ===
==== Group stage ====
Results

9 July 2022 Group stage	Greenock Morton	0–0 (4–5 p)	Falkirk	Greenock
15:00	Quitongo (red card) 45+1'	Report	Henderson (red card) 53'	Stadium: Cappielow; Attendance: 1,405; Referee: Colin Steven

12 July 2022 Group stage	Falkirk	1–0	Hibernian	Falkirk
19:45	Nesbitt 39'	Report		Stadium: Falkirk Stadium; Attendance: 3,918; Referee: Kevin Clancy

20 July 2022 Group stage	Bonnyrigg Rose Athletic	1–1 (2–4 p)	Falkirk	Bonnyrigg
19:45	Turner 42' (pen.)	Report	Morrison 9'	Stadium: New Dundas Park; Attendance: 1,507; Referee: Ross Hardie

23 July 2022 Group stage	Falkirk	1–0	Clyde	Falkirk
15:00	McGuffie 21'	Report		Stadium: Falkirk Stadium; Attendance: 1,911; Referee: Barry Cook

==== Knockout stage ====
30 August 2022 Second round	Dundee	3–0	Falkirk	Dundee
19:45	Cameron 55'; Ashcroft 80'; Robinson 90' (pen.)	Report	Oliver (red card) 89'	Stadium: Dens Park; Attendance: 3,195; Referee: Colin Steven

=== Scottish Challenge Cup ===
23 September 2022 Third round	Falkirk	2–0	Partick Thistle	Falkirk Stadium
19:45	Burrell 9'; Oliver 65'	Report		Attendance: 2,720; Referee: Lloyd Wilson

8 December 2022 Fourth round	Falkirk	0–3	Dundee	Falkirk Stadium
19:45		Report	Rudden 5' (pen.), 14'; Robertson 77'	Attendance: 1,700; Referee: Calum Scott

=== Scottish Cup ===
26 November 2022 Third round	Wick Academy	0–6	Falkirk	Harmsworth Park
15:00		Report	Burrell 41'; McGuffie 61'; Oliver 63', 70' (pen.); Donaldson 84'; McKay 87'	Attendance: 1,048; Referee: Barry Cook

21 January 2023 Fourth round	Alloa Athletic	1–2	Falkirk	Recreation Park
15:00	Donnelly 21'	Report	McKay 45'; Burrell 77'	Attendance: 1,532; Referee: Calum Scott

13 February 2023 Fifth round	Darvel	1–5	Falkirk	Recreation Park
19:45	Morrison 64' (o.g.); McGowan (red card) 77'	Report	Oliver 22'; Morrison 24'; Henderson 78'; Nesbitt 81'; McGuffie 88'	Attendance: 2,750; Referee: William Collum

13 March 2023 Quarter-final	Falkirk	2–1	Ayr United	Falkirk Stadium
19:45	Morrison 66' (pen.); Kennedy 83'	Report	Akinyemi 12'	Attendance: 6,375; Referee: Nick Walsh

29 April 2023 Semi-final	Falkirk	0–3	Inverness CT	Hampden Park
12:15		Report	McKay 7' (pen.), 57'; MacKay 34'	Attendance: 12,877; Referee: Nick Walsh

== Player statistics ==
As of (UTC) 13 May 2023

No.	Pos	Nat	Player	Total		League One		League Cup		Challenge Cup		Scottish Cup	
No.	Pos	Nat	Player	Apps	Goals	Apps	Goals	Apps	Goals	Apps	Goals	Apps	Goals
1	GK	(Scotland) SCO	P. J. Morrison	18	0	11+0	0	4+0	0	1+0	0	2+0	0
2	DF	(Scotland) SCO	Ryan Williamson	10	1	6+1	1	2+0	0	0+0	0	1+0	0
3	DF	(England) ENG	Blaine Rowe	20	0	15+2	0	0+0	0	0+0	0	3+0	0
4	MF	(Scotland) SCO	Stephen McGinn	47	3	34+2	3	4+0	0	2+0	0	5+0	0
5	DF	(Scotland) SCO	Liam Henderson	42	5	28+5	4	3+0	0	1+0	0	5+0	1
6	DF	(Scotland) SCO	Coll Donaldson	43	3	32+3	2	2+0	0	2+0	0	4+0	1
7	MF	(Scotland) SCO	Callumn Morrison	48	15	33+4	12	5+0	1	1+1	0	4+0	2
8	MF	(Scotland) SCO	Archie Meekison	1	0	0+1	0	0+0	0	0+0	0	0+0	0
9	FW	(Scotland) SCO	Jordan Allan	13	2	3+10	2	0+0	0	0+0	0	0+0	0
10	MF	(Scotland) SCO	Aidan Nesbitt	50	5	34+4	3	5+0	1	2+0	0	3+2	1
11	MF	(Scotland) SCO	Craig McGuffie	38	7	12+16	4	4+1	1	2+0	0	1+2	2
14	FW	(Scotland) SCO	Finn Yeats	39	0	15+13	0	5+0	0	1+1	0	0+4	0
15	DF	(Scotland) SCO	Leon McCann	45	0	34+0	0	3+1	0	2+0	0	5+0	0
16	FW	(Scotland) SCO	Matthew Wright	14	1	1+10	1	0+0	0	0+0	0	1+2	0
17	GK	(Scotland) SCO	Brian Kinnear	12	0	10+0	0	0+0	0	0+0	0	2+0	0
18	FW	(Scotland) SCO	Gary Oliver	50	10	29+9	6	5+0	0	1+1	1	2+3	3
19	FW	(England) ENG	Rumarn Burrell	38	12	15+16	9	0+1	0	2+0	1	2+2	2
21	FW	(Republic of Ireland) IRL	Ola Lawal	22	4	3+14	4	0+1	0	0+2	0	1+1	0
22	DF	(Scotland) SCO	Brad McKay	38	4	24+5	2	3+0	0	1+0	0	5+0	2
23	MF	(Ukraine) UKR	Max Kucheriavyi	17	1	9+6	1	0	0	0	0	2+0	0
26	DF	(Scotland) SCO	Sean Mackie	30	0	18+3	0	5+0	0	1+0	0	1+2	0
27	FW	(Scotland) SCO	Kyle Connolly	0	0	0+0	0	0+0	0	0+0	0	0+0	0
28	MF	(Scotland) SCO	Pearse Carroll	2	0	0+2	0	0+0	0	0+0	0	0+0	0
29	FW	(Scotland) SCO	Finlay Malcolm	0	0	0+0	0	0+0	0	0+0	0	0+0	0
36	DF	(Scotland) SCO	Logan Sinclair	1	0	0+1	0	0+0	0	0+0	0	0+0	0
37	DF	(Scotland) SCO	Max McGinley	1	0	0+1	0	0+0	0	0+0	0	0+0	0
44	DF	(Scotland) SCO	Paul Watson	1	0	1+0	0	0+0	0	0+0	0	0+0	0
73	MF	(Scotland) SCO	Kai Kennedy	38	11	20+11	10	0+0	0	1+1	0	4+1	1
Players who left the club during the 2022–23 season
8	MF	(England) ENG	Steven Hetherington	20	0	3+9	0	4+1	0	1+1	0	1+0	0
9	FW	(Colombia) COL	Juan Alegría	19	6	8+8	6	1+1	0	0+1	0	0+0	0
12	GK	(Scotland) SCO	Paddy Martin	2	0	0+1	0	0+0	0	1+0	0	0+0	0
16	MF	(Scotland) SCO	Seb Ross	6	0	0+1	0	0+3	0	0+1	0	0+1	0
17	FW	(Scotland) SCO	Jaime Wilson	4	0	0+0	0	0+4	0	0+0	0	0+0	0
20	DF	(Scotland) SCO	Blair Sneddon	2	0	0+0	0	0+2	0	0+0	0	0+0	0
29	FW	(Scotland) SCO	Finlay Malcolm	0	0	0+0	0	0+0	0	0+0	0	0+0	0
31	GK	(Scotland) SCO	Nicky Hogarth	17	0	15+0	0	1+0	0	0+0	0	1+0	0

== Team statistics ==
=== League table ===
Pos	Team	Pld	W	D	L	GF	GA	GD	Pts	Promotion, qualification or relegation
1	Dunfermline Athletic (C, P)	36	23	12	1	63	21	+42	81	Promotion to the Championship
2	Falkirk	36	19	10	7	70	39	+31	67	Qualification for the Championship play-offs
3	Airdrieonians (O, P)	36	17	9	10	82	51	+31	60	Qualification for the Championship play-offs
4	Alloa Athletic	36	17	6	13	56	47	+9	57	Qualification for the Championship play-offs
5	Queen of the South	36	16	6	14	59	59	0	54	

Rules for classification: 1) Points; 2) Goal difference; 3) Goals scored; 4) Head-to-to head points; 5) Head-to-head goal difference; 6) Play-off (only for deciding promotion, play-off participation and relegation).
(C) Champions; (O) Play-off winners; (P) Promoted

=== League Cup table ===
Pos	Team	Pld	W	PW	PL	L	GF	GA	GD	Pts	Qualification	FAL	GMO	HIB	BON	CLY
1	Falkirk	4	2	2	0	0	3	1	+2	10	Qualification for the second round	—	—	1–0	—	1–0
2	Greenock Morton	4	2	0	1	1	6	3	+3	7		0–0p	—	—	3–1	—
3	Hibernian	4	2	0	0	2	9	5	+4	6		—	0–3 (Note: Greenock Morton were awarded a technical 3−0 win over Hibernian, who fielded an ineligible player. The match had originally finished 1–1, with Greenock Morton securing the bonus point following a 3–1 win on penalties.)	—	—	5–0
4	Bonnyrigg Rose	4	1	0	1	2	5	9	−4	4		1–1p	—	1–4	—	—
5	Clyde	4	1	0	0	3	3	8	−5	3		—	2–0	—	1–2	—

Rules for classification: 1) goal difference, 2) goals scored, 3) away goals scored, 4) matches won, 5) away matches won, 6) drawing of lots.

== Transfers ==
=== Players in ===
Player	From	Fee
(Scotland) Liam Henderson	(Scotland) Arbroath	Free
(Scotland) Coll Donaldson	(Scotland) Ross County	Free
(Scotland) P. J. Morrison	(Scotland) Motherwell	Free
(Scotland) Stephen McGinn	(Scotland) Kilmarnock	Free
(Scotland) Gary Oliver	(Scotland) Greenock Morton	Free
(Scotland) Sean Mackie	(Scotland) Hibernian	Free
(Scotland) Finn Yeats	(Scotland) Aberdeen	Free
(Scotland) Lennon Walker	(Scotland) Dundee United	Free
(England) Rumarn Burrell	(England) Middlesbrough	Free
(Republic of Ireland) Ola Lawal	(England) Chippenham Town	Free
(Scotland) Jordan Allan	(Scotland) Clyde	Undisclosed

=== Players out ===
Player	To	Fee
(Scotland) Paul Dixon	(Scotland) Peterhead	Free
(Scotland) Anton Dowds	(Scotland) Partick Thistle	Free
(Scotland) Leigh Griffiths	(Australia) Mandurah City	Free
(Scotland) Mackenzie Lemon	(Scotland) Cowdenbeath	Free
(Scotland) Gary Miller	(Scotland) East Kilbride	Free
(Scotland) Robbie Mutch	(Scotland) FC Edinburgh	Free
(England) Samuel Ompreon	(England) Eastbourne Borough	Free
(Antigua and Barbuda) Aaron Taylor-Sinclair	(Scotland) Airdrieonians	Free
(Scotland) Charlie Telfer	(Scotland) Airdrieonians	Free
(Scotland) Ben Weekes	(Scotland) Cowdenbeath	Free
(Scotland) Cammy Williamson	(Scotland) Annan Athletic	Free
(Scotland) Johnny Armstrong	(Scotland) Open Goal Broomhill	Free
(Scotland) Luke Holt	(England) Lowestoft Town	Free
(Scotland) Jaime Wilson	Free Agent	Free
(Scotland) Seb Ross	(Scotland) Forfar Athletic	Free

=== Loans in ===
Player	To	Fee
(Scotland) Kai Kennedy	(Scotland) Rangers	Loan
(Colombia) Juan Alegría	(Scotland) Rangers	Loan
(Scotland) Nicky Hogarth	(England) Nottingham Forest	Loan
(England) Blaine Rowe	(England) Coventry City	Loan
(Scotland) Brian Kinnear	(England) West Ham United	Loan
(Scotland) Archie Meekison	(Scotland) Dundee United	Loan
(Scotland) Matthew Wright	(Scotland) Ross County	Loan
(Ukraine) Max Kucheriavyi	(Scotland) St Johnstone	Loan

=== Loans out ===
Player	To	Fee
(Scotland) Lennon Walker	(Scotland) Bo'ness United	Loan
(Scotland) Scott Honeyman	(Scotland) East Stirlingshire	Loan
(Scotland) Kyle Connolly	(Scotland) East Stirlingshire	Loan
(England) Steven Hetherington	(Scotland) Arbroath	Loan
(Scotland) Blair Sneddon	(Scotland) Berwick Rangers	Loan
(Scotland) Paddy Martin	(Scotland) Bonnyrigg Rose Athletic	Loan
(Scotland) Finlay Malcolm	(Scotland) Open Goal Broomhill	Loan

== See also ==
- List of Falkirk F.C. seasons
