= Jamie Barjonas =

Scottish professional footballer

Personal information
- Date of birth: 24 January 1999 (age 27)
- Place of birth: Leeds, England
- Height: 1.80 m (5 ft 11 in)
- Position: Midfielder

Team information
- Current team: Montrose
- Number: 8

Youth career
- 2008–2016: Rangers

Senior career*
Years	Team	Apps	(Gls)
2016–2021	Rangers	9	(0)
2018	→ Bury (loan)	4	(0)
2019	→ Raith Rovers (loan)	14	(2)
2020	→ Partick Thistle (loan)	5	(0)
2021	→ Ayr United (loan)	4	(0)
2021–2023	Kelty Hearts	66	(16)
2023–2025	Hamilton Academical	66	(5)
2025–2026	Airdrieonians	36	(0)
2026–	Montrose	11	(2)

International career^{‡}
2014	Scotland U15	1	(0)
2014	Scotland U16	2	(0)
2015–2016	Scotland U17	4	(0)
2017	Scotland U19	5	(0)
- * Club domestic league appearances and goals as of 21:25, 18 October 2026 (UTC) ‡ National team caps and goals as of 9 June 2018 (UTC)

Jamie Barjonas (born 24 January 1999) is a Scottish professional footballer who plays as a midfielder for Scottish League One club Montrose.

== Club career ==
Barjonas joined Rangers Academy as a nine-year-old. He signed a new contract in March 2016 which tied him to the club until May 2018. Barjonas made his debut for Rangers in a Scottish Premiership match against Partick Thistle on 7 May 2017, coming on as a 71st-minute substitute in a 2–1 win for the Gers.

On 15 August 2018, Barjonas joined League Two side Bury on loan until January 2019. He then moved on loan to Raith Rovers in January 2019, for the rest of the 2018/19 season. Barjonas was loaned to Ayr United in March 2021.

Barjonas signed for Kelty Hearts on 2 June 2021. Barjonas won the Scottish League Two title with Kelty in 2022 and was named in the PFA Scotland League Two Team of the Year.

In June 2023, Barjonas signed for Scottish League One club Hamilton Academical on a two-year deal.

Barjonas signed for Scottish Championship club Airdrieonians on the 20th June 2025 after leaving Hamilton Academical following their relegation to Scottish League One.

On 24 June 2026, Barjonas signed a two-year contract with Scottish League One side Montrose.

== International career ==
Barjonas has represented Scotland at various age levels.

He was born in Leeds, Yorkshire to Scottish parents, and the family moved back to Scotland when he was a small child. His uncommon surname originates from a Lithuanian great-grandfather.

== Career statistics ==
As of 5 April 2025

Club	Season	League			National cup (Note: Includes Scottish Cup)		League cup (Note: Includes Scottish League Cup)		Continental		Other		Total	
Club	Season	Division	Apps	Goals	Apps	Goals	Apps	Goals	Apps	Goals	Apps	Goals	Apps	Goals
Rangers	2016–17	Scottish Premiership	4	0	0	0	0	0	0	0	0	0	4	0
Rangers	2017–18	Scottish Premiership	5	0	0	0	0	0	0	0	0	0	5	0
Rangers	Total		9	0	0	0	0	0	0	0	0	0	9	0
Bury (loan)	2018–19	EFL League Two	4	0	0	0	0	0	—		4	0	8	0
Raith Rovers (loan)	2018–19	Scottish League One	14	2	1	0	0	0	—		4	0	19	2
Partick Thistle (loan)	2019–20	Scottish Championship	5	0	0	0	0	0	—		0	0	5	0
Ayr United (loan)	2020–21	Scottish Championship	4	0	2	0	—		—		0	0	6	0
Kelty Hearts	2021–22	Scottish League Two	31	9	5	0	4	0	—		1	0	41	9
Kelty Hearts	2022–23	Scottish League One	35	7	1	0	4	0	—		4	1	44	8
Kelty Hearts	Total		66	16	6	0	8	0	0	0	5	1	85	17
Hamilton Academical	2023–24	Scottish League One	34	4	1	0	4	0	—		7	1	46	5
Hamilton Academical	2024–25	Scottish Championship	28	1	2	0	4	0	—		2	0	36	1
Hamilton Academical	Total		62	5	3	0	8	0	0	0	9	1	82	6
Career total			164	23	12	0	16	0	0	0	22	2	214	25
