= Juan Alegría =

Colombian footballer (born 2002)

Personal information
- Full name: Juan Diego Alegría Arango
- Date of birth: 6 June 2002 (age 24)
- Place of birth: Ibagué, Colombia
- Height: 1.78 m (5 ft 10 in)
- Position: Forward

Team information
- Current team: Al-Arabi
- Number: 90

Youth career
- Deportes Tolima

Senior career*
Years	Team	Apps	(Gls)
2020	Honka Akatemia	4	(4)
2020-2021	Honka	16	(2)
2021–2023	Rangers	0	(0)
2022	→ Partick Thistle (loan)	10	(0)
2022–2023	→ Falkirk (loan)	16	(6)
2023	Honka	15	(1)
2023–2024	Jaguares de Córdoba	16	(1)
2024	Guangzhou FC	26	(18)
2025	Portimonense	5	(0)
2025–2026	Carabobo	13	(3)
2026–	Al-Arabi	0	(0)

International career^{‡}
2019	Colombia U17	2	(5)
- * Club domestic league appearances and goals as of 10 November 2025 ‡ National team caps and goals as of 7 October 2020

Juan Diego Alegría Arango (born 6 June 2002) is a Colombian professional footballer who plays as a forward for Emirati club Al-Arabi.

== Career ==
On 28 February 2022, Alegría joined Scottish Championship side Partick Thistle on loan from Rangers for the remainder of the 2021–22 season. On 20 July 2022, Alegría then joined Scottish League One side Falkirk on a season long loan deal and was allocated the number 9 shirt for the 2022-23 season. Rangers recalled Alegria from his loan on 19 January 2023.

On 5 April 2023, Rangers announced that Alegría had rejoined previous club FC Honka in Finnish Veikkausliiga on a permanent deal. He made his second debut for Honka on the same night, appearing as a substitute in a 2–0 loss to HJK Helsinki. Unable to make an impact, Alegria left Honka in the 2023 summer transfer window and returned to Jaguares de Córdoba in Colombia.

On 28 February 2024, Alegría joined China League One club Guangzhou FC.

== Career statistics ==
=== Club ===
As of 1 May 2025

Club	Season	League			Cups (Note: Includes Suomen Cup, Scottish Challenge Cup, Scottish League Cup)		Other		Total	
Club	Season	Division	Apps	Goals	Apps	Goals	Apps	Goals	Apps	Goals
Honka Akatemia	2020	Kakkonen	4	4	–		–		4	4
Honka	2020	Veikkausliiga	6	0	–		–		6	0
Honka	2021	Veikkausliiga	10	2	5	1	3 (Note: Appearances in UEFA Europa Conference League)	0	18	3
Honka	Total		16	2	5	1	3	0	24	3
Rangers	2021–22	Scottish Premiership	0	0	–		–		0	0
Rangers	2022–23	Scottish Premiership	0	0	–		–		0	0
Rangers	Total		0	0	0	0	0	0	0	0
Partick Thistle (loan)	2021–22	Scottish Championship	10	0	–		2 (Note: Appearances in Scottish Premiership play-off matches)	0	12	0
Falkirk (loan)	2022–23	Scottish League One	16	6	3	0	–		19	6
Honka	2023	Veikkausliiga	15	1	3	2	2	0	20	3
Jaguares de Córdoba	2023	Categoría Primera A	14	1	–		–		14	1
Jaguares de Córdoba	2024	Categoría Primera A	2	0	–		–		2	0
Jaguares de Córdoba	Total		16	1	–	–	–	–	16	1
Guangzhou FC	2024	China League One	26	18	0	0	–		26	18
Portimonense	2024–25	Liga Portugal 2	4	0	0	0	–		4	0
Career total			107	32	11	3	7	0	125	35
