= Kai Kennedy =

Scottish footballer (born 2002)

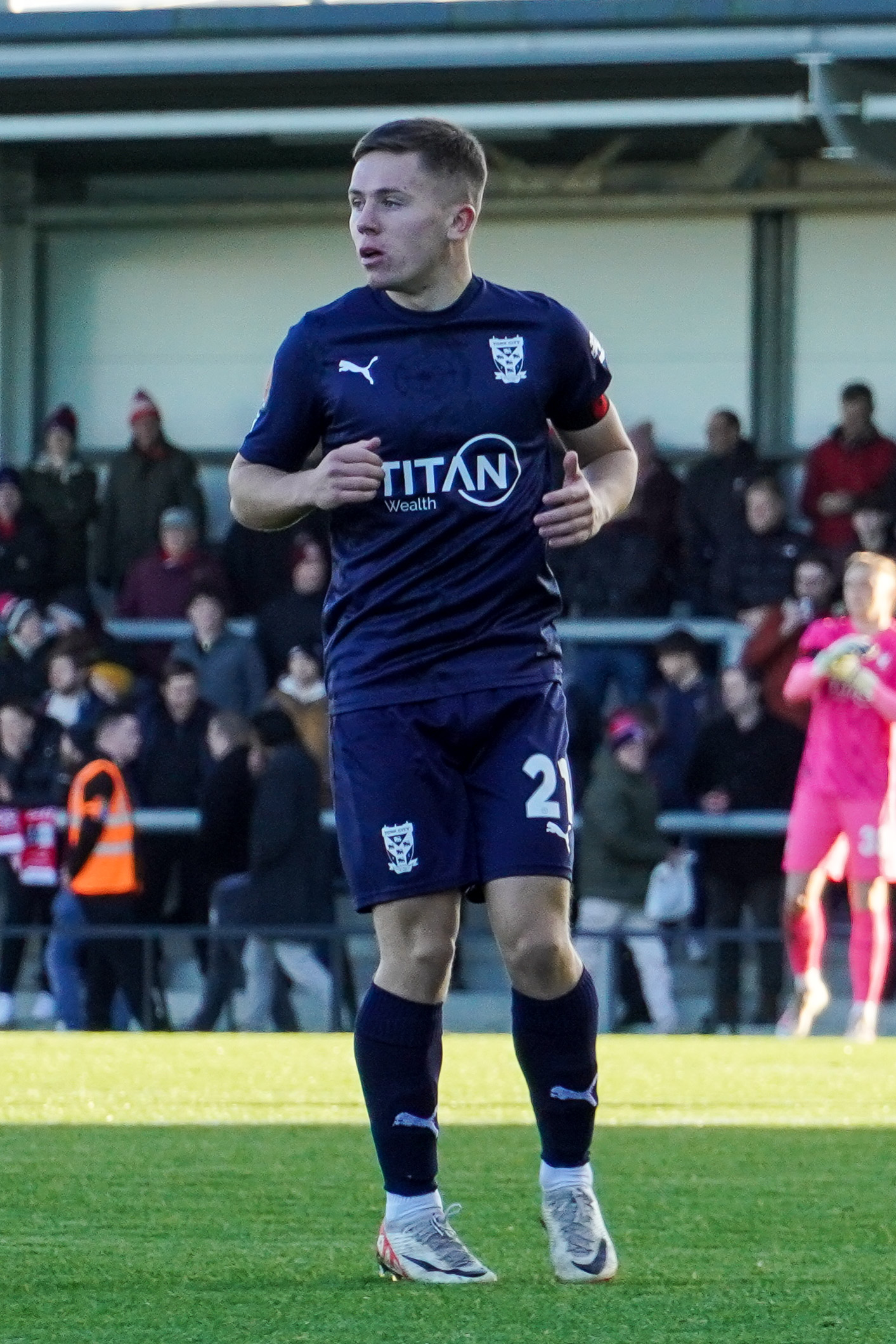
- Kennedy playing for York City in 2023.

Personal information
- Date of birth: 28 March 2002 (age 24)
- Place of birth: Glasgow, Scotland
- Position: Left winger

Team information
- Current team: Macarthur FC
- Number: 6

Youth career
- 2009–2019: Rangers

Senior career*
Years	Team	Apps	(Gls)
2019–2023	Rangers	0	(0)
2020–2021	→ Inverness Caledonian Thistle (loan)	8	(1)
2021	→ Raith Rovers (loan)	16	(1)
2021	→ Dunfermline Athletic (loan)	14	(1)
2022	→ Hamilton Academical (loan)	7	(1)
2022–2023	→ Falkirk (loan)	29	(9)
2023–2024	York City	14	(0)
2024–2026	Queen of the South	59	(10)
2026–	Macarthur FC	0	(0)

International career^{‡}
2018	Scotland U16	1	(0)
2018–2019	Scotland U17	7	(1)
2018–2019	Scotland U18		(3)
2019–2020	Scotland U19	4	(1)
2021	Scotland U21	1	(0)
- * Club domestic league appearances and goals as of 4 May 2026 ‡ National team caps and goals as of 6 October 2020

Kai Alexander Kennedy (born 28 March 2002) is a Scottish professional footballer who plays as a winger for A-League Men club Macarthur FC.

== Club career ==
Kennedy came through the youth system at Rangers. On 15 June 2018, Kennedy signed a three-year contract with the club. Kennedy debuted for the first-team at Rangers on 17 January 2020 in a Scottish Cup match against Stranraer at Ibrox Stadium.

In late September 2020, it was reported by the Daily Record that Kennedy was being chased by multiple clubs including Sheffield United, Manchester City, Roma and Bayern Munich due to a contract dispute with Rangers. In October 2020 he was loaned to Inverness Caledonian Thistle in the Scottish Championship. On 5 January 2021, Kennedy's loan at Inverness Caledonian Thistle was cut-short due to homesickness after Scotland was placed into another full lockdown, leaving him with the inability to travel between Inverness and his family in Glasgow.

On 8 January 2021, Kennedy signed a new contract with Rangers until the summer of 2023. On the same day he signed a loan deal with Raith Rovers until the end of the season. On 22 July 2021, Kennedy returned to Fife with Dunfermline Athletic, signing a season-long loan deal. Kennedy was recalled by his parent club during the January transfer window. On 14 January 2022, Kennedy joined Scottish Championship side Hamilton Academical on loan for the remainder of the 2021–22 season. On 14 July 2022, Kennedy was loaned to Falkirk for the 2022–23 season and was then released by Rangers at the end of that season.

During August 2023, Kennedy joined York City.

On 24 June 2024, Kennedy signed a one-year contract with Queen of the South. On 23 July 2026, Queen of the South confirmed Kennedy had left the club by mutual consent following “an ongoing issue internally”.

== International career ==
Kennedy has represented Scotland at various youth levels up to under-19s. He was promoted to the under-21 squad in November 2020.

== Career statistics ==
As of match played 21 January 2023

Appearances and goals by club, season and competition
Club	Season	League			National cup		League cup		Other		Total	
Club	Season	Division	Apps	Goals	Apps	Goals	Apps	Goals	Apps	Goals	Apps	Goals
Rangers	2019–20	Scottish Premiership	0	0	1	0	0	0	—		1	0
Rangers	2020–21	Scottish Premiership	0	0	0	0	0	0	—		0	0
Rangers	Total		0	0	1	0		0	0	0	1	0
Inverness Caledonian Thistle (loan)	2020–21	Scottish Championship	8	1	0	0	2	0	0	0	10	1
Raith Rovers (loan)	2020–21	Scottish Championship	16	1	2	0	0	0	1	0	19	1
Dunfermline Athletic (loan)	2021–22	Scottish Championship	14	1	0	0	0	0	0	0	14	1
Hamilton Academical (loan)	2021–22	Scottish Championship	7	1	0	0	0	0	0	0	7	1
Falkirk (loan)	2022–23	Scottish League One	29	9	2	0	0	0	2	0	33	9
Career total			74	13	5	0	2	0	3	0	84	13
