= Harrison Clark (footballer) =

English footballer

Personal information
- Date of birth: 11 May 2003 (age 23)
- Place of birth: Ashington, England
- Position: Midfielder

Team information
- Current team: Ashington

Youth career
- Chester-le-Street United

Senior career*
Years	Team	Apps	(Gls)
2021–2023	Livingston	0	(0)
2021–2022	→ Arbroath (loan)	8	(0)
2022	→ Kelty Hearts (loan)	3	(0)
2022–2023	→ Stirling Albion (loan)	15	(0)
2023	Gateshead	2	(0)
2023	→ Marske United (loan)	1	(0)
2023–2024	Blyth Spartans	35	(0)
2024–	Ashington	3	(0)
- * Club domestic league appearances and goals as of 15:50, 25 October 2024 (UTC)

Harrison Clark (born 11 May 2003) is an English professional footballer who plays as a midfielder for Ashington. Clark previously played for Stirling Albion and Livingston.

== Club career ==
Clark began his career with Chester-le-Street United before signing for Livingston in 2021.

He spent a loan spell with Arbroath in 2021, making 8 league appearances for them.

He spent a loan spell with Kelty Hearts in 2021, picking up a Scottish League Two winners medal.

The midfielder joined Stirling Albion on loan in July 2022, turning out 15 times for the Binos.

Clark left Livingston by mutual consent in January 2023, failing to make a single first team appearance.

He signed for Gateshead in February 2023.

Clark signed for Marske United on loan on 28 February 2023.

In June 2023, Clark joined National League North club Blyth Spartans.

In October 2024, Clark joined hometown club Ashington.

== Honours ==
Kelty Hearts

- Scottish League Two: 2021–22
