= 2017–18 Hamilton Academical F.C. season =

Hamilton Academical
2017–18 season
- Chairman: Les Gray
- Manager: Martin Canning
- Stadium: New Douglas Park
- Scottish Premiership: 10th
- Scottish Cup: Fourth round
- League Cup: Second round
- Top goalscorer: League: David Templeton; Dougie Imrie (8 each); All: David Templeton (9 goals)
- Highest home attendance: 5,400 vs. Rangers, Premiership, 29 September 2017
- Lowest home attendance: 657 vs. Stenhousemuir, League Cup, 29 July 2017
- Average home league attendance: 3,095
| Home colours | Away colours |

The 2017–18 season was Hamilton Academical's fourth consecutive season in the top flight of Scottish football since their promotion at the end of the 2013–14 season. Hamilton also competed in the League Cup and the Scottish Cup.

== Summary ==
=== Season ===
Hamilton finished in tenth place in the Scottish Premiership and only avoided the relegation play-off place on the final day of the season due to goal difference with Partick Thistle's victory over Dundee. Hamilton also reached the second round of the league cup and the fourth round of the Scottish Cup.

== Results and fixtures ==
Win Draw Loss Postponed

=== Scottish Premiership ===
| 6 August 2017 | Aberdeen | 2–0 | Hamilton Academical | Pittodrie Stadium, Aberdeen |
| 15:00 | O'Connor 26'; Storey 90' | Report | Tomas (red card) 62' | Attendance: 15,165; Referee: Euan Anderson |

| 12 August 2017 | Hamilton Academical | 3–0 | Dundee | New Douglas Park, Hamilton |
| 15:00 | MacKinnon 24'; Boyd 36'; Imrie 85' (pen.) | Report | | Attendance: 1,694; Referee: Bobby Madden |

| 19 August 2017 | Hibernian | 1–3 | Hamilton Academical | Easter Road, Edinburgh |
| 15:00 | Stokes 3' | Report | Bingham 52' (pen.), 88'; Longridge 69' | Attendance: 16,633; Referee: Steven McLean |

| 26 August 2017 | Kilmarnock | 2–2 | Hamilton Academical | Rugby Park, Kilmarnock |
| 15:00 | Longridge 3' (o.g.); Erwin 58' | BBC Report | Skondras 72'; Crawford 88' (pen.) | Attendance: 3,706; Referee: Andrew Dallas |

| 8 September 2017 | Hamilton Academical | 1–4 | Celtic | New Douglas Park, Hamilton |
| 19:45 | Gogić 86' | Report | Armstrong 17'; Sinclair 29', 42'; Édouard 65' | Attendance: 5,208; Referee: Don Robertson |

| 16 September 2017 | Hamilton Academical | 1–2 | Heart of Midlothian | New Douglas Park, Hamilton |
| 15:00 | Bingham 33' | Report | Callachan 3'; Lafferty 23' (pen.) | Attendance: 3,326; Referee: Bobby Madden |

| 23 September 2017 | St Johnstone | 2–1 | Hamilton Academical | McDiarmid Park, Perth |
| 15:00 | MacLean 49'; Davidson 84' | Report | Docherty 24' | Attendance: 2,880; Referee: Willie Collum |

| 29 September 2017 | Hamilton Academical | 1–4 | Rangers | New Douglas Park, Hamilton |
| 19:45 | Redmond 1' | Report | John 21', 25'; Candeias 27'; Dorrans 59' (pen.) | Attendance: 5,400; Referee: Andrew Dallas |

| 14 October 2017 | Hamilton Academical | 1–2 | Motherwell | New Douglas Park, Hamilton |
| 15:00 | Skondras 15' | Report | Rose 32'; Hartley 51' | Attendance: 3,869; Referee: Craig Thomson |

| 21 October 2017 | Ross County | 2–1 | Hamilton Academical | Victoria Park, Dingwall |
| 15:00 | Schalk 70'; Mikkelsen 86' | Report | Docherty 52' | Attendance: 3,509; Referee: Stephen Finnie |

| 24 October 2017 | Hamilton Academical | 0–0 | Partick Thistle | New Douglas Park, Hamilton |
| 19:45 | | Report | | Attendance: 2,236; Referee: Steven McLean |

| 28 October 2017 | Dundee | 1–3 | Hamilton Academical | Dens Park, Dundee |
| 15:00 | Leitch-Smith 67' (pen.) | Report | Skondras 39'; Templeton 64'; Rojano 86' | Attendance: 4,863; Referee: Greg Aitken |

| 4 November 2017 | Hamilton Academical | 2–2 | Aberdeen | New Douglas Park, Hamilton |
| 15:00 | Imrie 19'; Templeton 76' | Report | Stewart 27'; Árnason 74' | Attendance: 3,099; Referee: Nick Walsh |

| 18 November 2017 | Rangers | 0–2 | Hamilton Academical | Ibrox Stadium, Glasgow |
| 15:00 | | Report | Templeton 47'; Lyon 81' | Attendance: 48,892; Referee: Greg Aitken |

| 25 November 2017 | Hamilton Academical | 1–1 | Hibernian | New Douglas Park, Hamilton |
| 15:00 | Rojano 72' | Report | Murray 29' | Attendance: 2,945; Referee: Don Robertson |

| 2 December 2017 | Heart of Midlothian | 1–1 | Hamilton Academical | Tynecastle Stadium, Edinburgh |
| 15:00 | Walker 47' | Report | Tomas 69' | Attendance: 15,357; Referee: Bobby Madden |

| 9 December 2017 | Hamilton Academical | 0–1 | St Johnstone | New Douglas Park, Hamilton |
| 15:00 | | Report | Scougall 66' | Attendance: 1,451; Referee: Craig Thomson |

| 13 December 2017 | Celtic | 3–1 | Hamilton Academical | Celtic Park, Glasgow |
| 19:45 | Ntcham 12'; Forrest 40'; Sinclair 41' | Report | Redmond 29' | Attendance: 53,883; Referee: Stephen Finnie |

| 16 December 2017 | Hamilton Academical | 3–2 | Ross County | New Douglas Park, Hamilton |
| 15:00 | Imrie 30' (pen.); Sarris 75'; Lindsay 89' (o.g.) | Report | Curran 73' van der Weg 84' | Attendance: 1,272; Referee: Gavin Duncan |

| 23 December 2017 | Partick Thistle | 1–0 | Hamilton Academical | Firhill Stadium, Glasgow |
| 15:00 | Keown 26' | Report | | Attendance: 2,912; Referee: Bobby Madden |

| 30 December 2017 | Motherwell | 1–3 | Hamilton Academical | Fir Park, Motherwell |
| 15:00 GMT (UTC) | Tanner 3'; Hartley (yellow card) 41' (red card) 90+4'; Grimshaw (yellow card) 86'; Hammell (yellow card) 88' | Report | Tomas (yellow card) 37'; Imrie 41' (pen.); Donati (yellow card) 52'; Bingham 53'; Docherty 76' | Attendance: 4,890; Referee: Andrew Dallas |

| 24 January 2018 | Hamilton Academical | 0–3 | Heart of Midlothian | New Douglas Park, Hamilton |
| 19:45 | | Report | Callachan 67'; Milinković 73'; Zanatta 87' | Attendance: 2,077; Referee: Walsh |

| 27 January 2018 | Hamilton Academical | 1–2 | Dundee | New Douglas Park, Hamilton |
| | O'Hara 2' (o.g.); Redmond (yellow card) 25'; Ferguson (yellow card) 39'; Templeton (yellow card) 69' (yellow-red card) 74'; Woods (yellow card) 90' | Report | O'Hara (yellow card) 55'; Holt (yellow card) 57'; Henvey 77'; Leitch-Smith 90+8' | Attendance: 1,776; Referee: Clancy |

| 3 February 2018 | Aberdeen | 3–0 | Hamilton Academical | Pittodrie Stadium, Aberdeen |
| 15:00 GMT | Considine 26', 87'; McGinn 80' | Report | Sarris (yellow card) 90+2' | Attendance: 13,531; Referee: Euan Anderson |

| 18 February 2018 | Hamilton Academical | 3–5 | Rangers | New Douglas Park, Hamilton |
| 14:15 | Lyon 5'; Templeton 22'; Imrie 88' (pen.) | Report | Murphy 10'; Windass 19', 34', 72'; Morelos 27' | Attendance: 5,406; Referee: Madden |

| 24 February 2018 | Hamilton Academical | 2–1 | Partick Thistle | New Douglas Park, Hamilton |
| | Sarris (yellow card) 9'; Rojano 11'; Imrie (yellow card) 41'; Ferguson (yellow card) 56'; Jenkins (yellow card) 69'; Templeton 90' | Report | Sammon 9' (pen.); Osman (yellow card) 85'; Erskine (yellow card) 88' | Attendance: 2,243; Referee: Walsh |

| 10 March 2018 | Hamilton Academical | 2–0 | Motherwell | New Douglas Park, Hamilton |
| 15:00 GMT (UTC) | Ogkmpoe 11'; Ferguson (yellow card) 34'; Templeton 69' | Report | Kipré (yellow card) 51'; Dunne (yellow card) 77' | Attendance: 3,182; Referee: Steven McLean |

| 17 March 2018 | Ross County | 2–2 | Hamilton Academical | Victoria Park, Dingwall |
| 15:00 | Lindsay 23'; Davies 76' | Report | Imrie 49'; Ogkmpoe 52' | Attendance: 3,586; Referee: Kevin Clancy |

| 28 March 2018 | St Johnstone | 1–0 | Hamilton Academical | McDiarmid Park, Perth |
| | MacLean 5' | Report | | Attendance: 2,037; Referee: Euan Anderson |

| 31 March 2018 | Kilmarnock | 2–0 | Hamilton Academical | Rugby Park, Kilmarnock |
| | Erwin 5', (yellow card) 77'; O'Donnell 45+4' | Report | Hughes (yellow card) 35'; Imrie (yellow card) 52'; Sarris (yellow card) 63'; Rojano (yellow card) 80' | Attendance: 4,672; Referee: Alan Muir |

| 3 April 2018 | Hibernian | 3–1 | Hamilton Academical | Easter Road, Edinburgh |
| | Whittaker (yellow card) 6'; Kamberi 17', 63', 85' | Report | Ogkmpoe 9'; Imrie (yellow card) 12' (yellow-red card) 62'; Redmond (yellow card) 31'; Rojano (yellow card) 69'; MacKinnon (yellow card) 78' | Attendance: 15,818; Referee: McLean |

| 8 April 2018 | Hamilton Academical | 1–2 | Celtic | New Douglas Park, Hamilton |
| | Bingham 18' | Report | McGregor 3'; Griffiths 46' | Attendance: 4,851; Referee: Andrew Dallas |

| 14 April 2018 | Hamilton Academical | 1–2 | Kilmarnock | New Douglas Park, Hamilton |
| | Tomas (yellow card) 30'; Sarris (yellow card) 32'; Fasan 73' (o.g.) van der Weg (yellow card) 90' | Report | Broadfoot 63'; Dicker (yellow card) 72'; Boyd 79' | Attendance: 4,348; Referee: Barry Cook |

| 21 April 2018 | Partick Thistle | 2–1 | Hamilton Academical | Firhill Stadium, Glasgow |
| | Doolan 64'; Edwards 72' | Report | Templeton 43' | Attendance: 3,839; Referee: John Beaton |

| 28 April 2018 | Hamilton Academical | 2–0 | Ross County | New Douglas Park, Hamilton |
| | Imrie 56'; Templeton 67' | Report | | Attendance: 2,057; Referee: Bobby Madden |

| 5 May 2018 | Dundee | 1–0 | Hamilton Academical | Dens Park, Dundee |
| | Holt 18' | Report | | Attendance: 5,195; Referee: Steven McLean |

| 8 May 2018 | Hamilton Academical | 1–2 | St Johnstone | New Douglas Park, Hamilton |
| | Imrie 82' | Report | McMillan 65' (pen.); Wotherspoon 80' | Attendance: 2,367; Referee: Kevin Clancy |

| 12 May 2018 | Motherwell | 3–0 | Hamilton Academical | Fir Park, Motherwell |
| | Ciftci 31', 70'; Aldred 73' | Report | | Attendance: 4,699; Referee: Alan Muir |

=== Scottish League Cup ===
==== Group stage ====
Results

| 15 July 2017 Group Stage | East Kilbride | 1–3 | Hamilton Academical | K-Park Training Academy, East Kilbride |
| 14:00 | Winter 69' (pen.) | Report | MacKinnon 39'; Longridge 81'; Crawford 90+1' | Attendance: 531; Referee: Craig Napier |

| 22 July 2017 Group Stage | Hamilton Academical | 1–1 (6–5 p) | Queen of the South | New Douglas Park, Hamilton |
| 15:00 | Boyd 88' | Report | Dobbie 89' | Attendance: 1,047; Referee: Willie Collum |
| | Penalties |
| | Gillespie (penalty missed); Redmond (penalty missed); Crawford (penalty scored); Sarris (penalty scored); Bingham (penalty scored); Boyd (penalty scored); MacKinnon (penalty scored); Templeton (penalty scored) | | (penalty scored) Lyle; (penalty scored) Dobbie; (penalty missed) Dykes; (penalty scored) Jacobs; (penalty missed) Rankin; (penalty scored) Fordyce; (penalty scored) Tapping; (penalty missed) Brownlie |

| 25 July 2017 Group Stage | Albion Rovers | 4–4 (4–2 p) | Hamilton Academical | Cliftonhill, Coatbridge |
| 19:45 | Trouten 9', 53', 64'; Davidson 90+3' | Report | Donati 38'; Want 45+2', 57'; Bingham 74' (pen.) | Attendance: 497; Referee: Barry Cook |
| | Penalties |
| | McMullin (penalty scored); Hopkins (penalty scored); McLaughlin (penalty scored); Trouten (penalty scored) | | (penalty missed) Donati; (penalty missed) Docherty; (penalty scored) Crawford; (penalty scored) Bingham |

| 29 July 2017 Group Stage | Hamilton Academical | 3–0 | Stenhousemuir | New Douglas Park, Hamilton |
| 15:00 | Crawford 15'; Templeton 56'; Boyd 74' | Report | | Attendance: 657; Referee: Steven McLean |

==== Knockout stage ====
| 9 August 2017 Second round | Hamilton Academical | 0–1 | Aberdeen | New Douglas Park, Hamilton |
| 19:45 | | Report | McLean 43' | Attendance: 2,768; Referee: Nick Walsh |

=== Scottish Cup ===
| 20 January 2017 Fourth round | Motherwell | 2–0 | Hamilton Academical | Fir Park, Motherwell |
| | McMann 4' (o.g.), Tanner 35' (pen.) | Report | | Attendance: 4,725; Referee: Craig Thomson |

== Squad statistics ==
=== Appearances ===
As of match played 12 May 2018

| No. | Pos | Nat | Player | Total | | Scottish Premiership | | Scottish Cup | | Scottish League Cup | |
| No. | Pos | Nat | Player | Apps | Goals | Apps | Goals | Apps | Goals | Apps | Goals |
|---|---|---|---|---|---|---|---|---|---|---|---|
| 1 | GK | (England) ENG | Gary Woods | 37 | 0 | 32 | 0 | 1 | 0 | 4 | 0 |
| 2 | DF | (Greece) GRE | Giannis Skondras | 23 | 3 | 20+1 | 3 | 0 | 0 | 2 | 0 |
| 3 | DF | (Scotland) SCO | Scott McMann | 39 | 0 | 30+4 | 0 | 1 | 0 | 4 | 0 |
| 4 | MF | (England) ENG | Ross Jenkins | 11 | 0 | 9+2 | 0 | 0 | 0 | 0 | 0 |
| 5 | DF | (France) FRA | Xavier Tomas | 40 | 1 | 36 | 1 | 1 | 0 | 3 | 0 |
| 6 | MF | (England) ENG | Charlie Scott | 2 | 0 | 1+1 | 0 | 0 | 0 | 0 | 0 |
| 7 | MF | (Scotland) SCO | Dougie Imrie | 41 | 8 | 33+2 | 8 | 1 | 0 | 5 | 0 |
| 8 | FW | (England) ENG | Mickel Miller | 6 | 0 | 1+5 | 0 | 0 | 0 | 0 | 0 |
| 9 | FW | (England) ENG | Rakish Bingham | 38 | 6 | 18+14 | 5 | 1 | 0 | 4+1 | 1 |
| 10 | FW | (England) ENG | Daniel Redmond | 31 | 2 | 11+14 | 2 | 0+1 | 0 | 2+3 | 0 |
| 11 | MF | (Scotland) SCO | Ali Crawford | 19 | 3 | 11+3 | 1 | 0 | 0 | 4+1 | 2 |
| 12 | GK | (Scotland) SCO | Ryan Fulton | 7 | 0 | 5+1 | 0 | 0 | 0 | 1 | 0 |
| 13 | DF | (Cyprus) CYP | Alex Gogić | 21 | 1 | 15+3 | 1 | 0 | 0 | 3 | 0 |
| 15 | DF | (Netherlands) NED | Kenny van der Weg | 11 | 0 | 10+1 | 0 | 0 | 0 | 0 | 0 |
| 16 | MF | (Scotland) SCO | David Templeton | 31 | 9 | 20+7 | 8 | 1 | 0 | 1+2 | 1 |
| 17 | MF | (Scotland) SCO | Louis Longridge | 13 | 2 | 3+6 | 1 | 0 | 0 | 2+2 | 1 |
| 18 | MF | (Scotland) SCO | Darian MacKinnon | 36 | 2 | 31 | 1 | 1 | 0 | 4 | 1 |
| 19 | GK | (Scotland) SCO | Darren Jamieson | 2 | 0 | 1+1 | 0 | 0 | 0 | 0 | 0 |
| 20 | FW | (Argentina) ARG | Antonio Rojano | 26 | 3 | 14+12 | 3 | 0 | 0 | 0 | 0 |
| 21 | MF | (Scotland) SCO | Lewis Smith | 13 | 1 | 6+4 | 0 | 1 | 0 | 1+1 | 1 |
| 22 | MF | (Scotland) SCO | Darren Lyon | 30 | 2 | 21+6 | 2 | 1 | 0 | 1+1 | 0 |
| 23 | MF | (Scotland) SCO | Ronan Hughes | 4 | 0 | 2+1 | 0 | 0+1 | 0 | 0 | 0 |
| 25 | MF | (Scotland) SCO | Lewis Ferguson | 14 | 0 | 12+1 | 0 | 1+0 | 0 | 0 | 0 |
| 27 | DF | (Scotland) SCO | Shaun Want | 14 | 2 | 13 | 0 | 0 | 0 | 1 | 2 |
| 28 | FW | (Scotland) SCO | Ross Cunningham | 7 | 0 | 0+6 | 0 | 0+1 | 0 | 0 | 0 |
| 29 | MF | (Scotland) SCO | Jack Breen | 0 | 0 | 0+0 | 0 | 0+0 | 0 | 0 | 0 |
| 30 | FW | (Scotland) SCO | Steven Boyd | 18 | 3 | 7+6 | 1 | 0 | 0 | 2+3 | 2 |
| 89 | DF | (Greece) GRE | Georgios Sarris | 24 | 1 | 19+2 | 1 | 0 | 0 | 3 | 0 |
| 99 | FW | (Greece) GRE | Marios Ogkmpoe | 17 | 3 | 12+4 | 3 | 0 | 0 | 1 | 0 |
Players who left the club during the 2017–18 season
| 4 | DF | (Scotland) SCO | Mikey Devlin | 0 | 0 | 0 | 0 | 0 | 0 | 0 | 0 |
| 6 | MF | (Scotland) SCO | Grant Gillespie | 7 | 0 | 1+2 | 0 | 0 | 0 | 4 | 0 |
| 8 | MF | (Scotland) SCO | Greg Docherty | 25 | 3 | 21 | 3 | 0 | 0 | 3+1 | 0 |
| 14 | FW | (Scotland) SCO | Botti Biabi | 4 | 0 | 2+2 | 0 | 0 | 0 | 0 | 0 |
| 21 | MF | (Italy) ITA | Massimo Donati | 13 | 1 | 6+4 | 0 | 1 | 0 | 1+1 | 1 |
| 24 | FW | (Scotland) SCO | Ryan Tierney | 1 | 0 | 0 | 0 | 0 | 0 | 1 | 0 |

== Team statistics ==
=== League table ===
| Pos | Team | Pld | W | D | L | GF | GA | GD | Pts | Qualification or relegation (Note: Teams play each other three times (33 matches) before the league is split into two groups (the top six and the bottom six).) |
|---|---|---|---|---|---|---|---|---|---|---|
| 8 | St Johnstone | 38 | 12 | 10 | 16 | 42 | 53 | −11 | 46 | |
| 9 | Dundee | 38 | 11 | 6 | 21 | 36 | 57 | −21 | 39 | |
| 10 | Hamilton Academical | 38 | 9 | 6 | 23 | 47 | 68 | −21 | 33 | |
| 11 | Partick Thistle (R) | 38 | 8 | 9 | 21 | 31 | 61 | −30 | 33 | Qualification for the Premiership play-off final |
| 12 | Ross County (R) | 38 | 6 | 11 | 21 | 40 | 62 | −22 | 29 | Relegation to the Championship |

Source: Soccerway BBC
Rules for classification: 1) Points; 2) Goal difference; 3) Goals scored; 4) Play-off (only if deciding champion, UEFA competitions qualification and second-stage group allocation).
(R) Relegated

=== Division summary ===
| Round | 1 | 2 | 3 | 4 | 5 | 6 | 7 | 8 | 9 | 10 | 11 | 12 | 13 | 14 | 15 | 16 | 17 | 18 | 19 | 20 | 21 | 22 | 23 | 24 | 25 | 26 | 27 | 28 | 29 | 30 | 31 | 32 | 33 | 34 | 35 | 36 | 37 | 38 |
|---|---|---|---|---|---|---|---|---|---|---|---|---|---|---|---|---|---|---|---|---|---|---|---|---|---|---|---|---|---|---|---|---|---|---|---|---|---|---|
| Ground | A | H | A | A | H | H | A | H | H | A | H | A | H | A | H | A | H | A | H | A | A | H | H | A | H | H | H | A | A | A | A | H | H | A | H | A | H | A |
| Result | L | W | W | D | L | L | L | L | L | L | D | W | D | W | D | D | L | L | W | L | W | L | L | L | L | W | W | D | L | L | L | L | L | L | W | L | L | L |
| Position | 11 | 5 | 4 | 4 | 7 | 8 | 8 | 9 | 9 | 10 | 9 | 8 | 9 | 8 | 8 | 8 | 9 | 9 | 9 | 9 | 9 | 10 | 10 | 11 | 11 | 10 | 9 | 9 | 9 | 9 | 9 | 9 | 9 | 10 | 9 | 10 | 10 | 10 |

Updated to match(es) played on 12 May 2018. Source:
A = Away; H = Home; W = Win; D = Draw; L = Loss

=== League Cup Table ===
| Pos | Team | Pld | W | PW | PL | L | GF | GA | GD | Pts | Qualification | HAM | ALB | QOS | EKI | STE |
|---|---|---|---|---|---|---|---|---|---|---|---|---|---|---|---|---|
| 1 | Hamilton Academical (Q) | 4 | 2 | 1 | 1 | 0 | 10 | 6 | +4 | 9 | Qualification for the Second Round | — | — | p1–1 | — | 3–0 |
| 2 | Albion Rovers | 4 | 1 | 1 | 2 | 0 | 12 | 9 | +3 | 7 | | p4–4 | — | — | — | 1–1p |
| 3 | Queen of the South | 4 | 1 | 1 | 2 | 0 | 6 | 4 | +2 | 7 | | — | p2–2 | — | 0–0p | — |
| 4 | East Kilbride | 4 | 1 | 1 | 0 | 2 | 5 | 9 | −4 | 5 | | 1–3 | 2–5 | — | — | — |
| 5 | Stenhousemuir | 4 | 0 | 1 | 0 | 3 | 3 | 9 | −6 | 2 | | — | — | 1–3 | 1–2 | — |

Rules for classification: 1) goal difference, 2) goals scored, 3) away goals scored, 4) matches won, 5) away matches won, 6) drawing of lots.
(Q) Qualified to the phase indicated

== Transfers ==
=== In ===
| Date | Position | Nationality | Name | From | Fee |
|---|---|---|---|---|---|
| 14 July 2017 | DF | (France) | Xavier Tomas | FC Lausanne-Sport | Free transfer |
| 18 July 2017 | GK | (Scotland) | Ryan Fulton | Liverpool | Free transfer |
| 22 August 2017 | FW | (Argentina) | Antonio Rojano | Real Potosí | Free transfer |
| 31 August 2017 | FW | (Scotland) | Botti Biabi | Swansea City | Loan |
| 10 January 2018 | MF | (Greece) | Chrysovalantis Kozoronis | PAS Giannina | Free transfer |
| 20 January 2018 | FW | (England) | Mickel Miller | Carshalton Athletic | Undisclosed |
| 24 January 2018 | FW | (Greece) | Marios Ogkmpoe | OFI Crete | Free transfer |
| 31 January 2018 | DF | (England) | Charlie Scott | Manchester United | Loan |
| 12 February 2018 | DF | (Netherlands) | Kenny van der Weg | Ross County | Free transfer |
| 12 February 2018 | MF | (England) | Ross Jenkins | Viking FK | Free transfer |

=== Out ===
| Date | Position | Nationality | Name | To | Fee |
|---|---|---|---|---|---|
| 31 May 2017 | FW | (Brazil) | Alexandre D'Acol | Lamia | Free transfer |
| 7 June 2017 | DF | (Scotland) | Jack Breslin | Clyde | Free transfer |
| 7 June 2017 | DF | (Scotland) | Craig Watson | East Fife | Free transfer |
| 22 June 2017 | DF | (England) | Blair Adams | Hartlepool United | Free transfer |
| 4 July 2017 | MF | (Kosovo) | Gramoz Kurtaj | SHB Da Nang | Free transfer |
| 17 August 2017 | DF | (Scotland) | Jordan McGregor | Airdrieonians | Loan |
| 18 August 2017 | FW | (Scotland) | Eamonn Brophy | Kilmarnock | Free transfer |
| 18 August 2017 | FW | (Scotland) | Ryan Tierney | Airdrieonians | Loan |
| 5 January 2018 | DF | (Scotland) | Louis Longridge | Falkirk | Free transfer |
| 18 January 2018 | FW | (Scotland) | Steven Boyd | Livingston | Loan |
| 25 January 2018 | MF | (Scotland) | Greg Docherty | Rangers | Undisclosed |
| 26 January 2018 | FW | (Scotland) | Michael Devlin | Aberdeen | Undisclosed |
| 31 January 2018 | MF | (Scotland) | Grant Gillespie | Dundee United | Free transfer |
| 20 February 2018 | MF | (Italy) | Massimo Donati | St Mirren | Free transfer |
| 20 March 2018 | MF | (Greece) | Chrysovalantis Kozoronis | Free agent | Released |
