= 2021–22 Scottish Challenge Cup =

Tournament details
- Country: Scotland
- Dates: 10 August 2021 – 3 April 2022
- Teams: 50

Final positions
- Champions: Raith Rovers
- Runners-up: Queen of the South

Tournament statistics
- Matches played: 44
- Goals scored: 120 (2.73 per match)
- Top goal scorer(s): Billy Mckay (5 goals)
- All statistics correct as of 3 April 2022.

The 2021–22 Scottish Challenge Cup known as the SPFL Trust Trophy due to sponsorship reasons, was the 30th season of the competition. The total number of participating clubs was 50, down from 58, with only Scottish clubs competing due to the COVID-19 pandemic in Scotland. The competition began on 10 August 2021 with the first round and ended on 3 April 2022 with the final at the Excelsior Stadium in Airdrie, North Lanarkshire.

Thirty teams from the Championship, League One and League Two competed, along with four teams from the Highland Football League and four from the Lowland Football League. In addition to this, Under-21 teams of the clubs competing in the Scottish Premiership were represented. This season no clubs from Northern Ireland, Wales, Republic of Ireland or England entered the competition to reduce unnecessary travel during the COVID-19 pandemic.

The defending champions were Inverness Caledonian Thistle and Raith Rovers, who met in the Quarter final, with Raith winning 5–4 on penalties.

== Format ==
| Round | Date | Fixtures | Clubs | New entries |
|---|---|---|---|---|
| First round | 10–11 August 2021 | 18 | 50 → 32 | 6 teams from 2020–21 Scottish League One (5th–10th); Teams from 2020–21 Scottish League Two; 4 teams from 2020–21 Lowland Football League (1st–4th); 4 teams from 2020–21 Highland Football League (1st–4th); 12 U21 teams from 2021–22 Scottish Premiership |
| Second round | 4–5 September 2021 | 16 | 32 → 16 | Teams from 2020–21 Scottish Championship; 4 teams from 2020–21 Scottish League One (1st–4th) |
| Third round | 9–10 October 2021 | 8 | 16 → 8 | |
| Quarter-finals | 30 November–1 December 2021 | 4 | 8 → 4 | |
| Semi-finals | 1–2 March 2022 | 2 | 4 → 2 | |
| Final | 2 or 3 April 2022 | 1 | 2 → 1 | |

== First round ==
The first round featured 6 clubs from 2020–21 Scottish League One, all clubs from 2020–21 Scottish League Two, 4 clubs from the 2020–21 Scottish Highland Football League, 4 clubs from the 2020–21 Scottish Lowland Football League and the 12 Under 21 teams of the 2021–22 Scottish Premiership.

The draw was made on 6 July 2021 at 14:00 and was broadcast live on the SPFL YouTube Channel. The draw was regionalised and seeded. Matches were played on 10, 11 and 17 August 2021.

Livingston and Ross County were unable to field B teams for the first round and withdrew from the competition. Their scheduled opponents, Albion Rovers and Stirling Albion, were awarded byes into the second round.

=== North Section ===
==== Draw ====
Teams that entered the competition in the first round.

| Seeded Teams | Unseeded Teams |
|---|---|
| East Fife; Peterhead; Forfar Athletic; Elgin City; Stirling Albion; Stenhousemuir; Cowdenbeath; Brechin City; Brora Rangers | Fraserburgh; Buckie Thistle; Formartine United; Aberdeen B; Dundee B; Dundee United B; Hibernian B; Ross County B; St Johnstone B |

==== Matches ====
| 10 August 2021 | Fraserburgh | 0–1 | Cowdenbeath | Fraserburgh |
| 19:30 | | | Buchanan 90+2' | Stadium: Bellslea Park; Attendance: 250; Referee: Chris Fordyce |

| 10 August 2021 | Stenhousemuir | 3–0 | Dundee United B | Stenhousemuir |
| 19:30 | Jamieson 31'; Tierney 37'; Graham 77' | | | Stadium: Ochilview Park; Attendance: 164; Referee: Barry Cook |

| 10 August 2021 | East Fife | 1–0 | St Johnstone B | Methil |
| 19:45 | Mercer 33' | | | Stadium: Bayview Stadium; Attendance: 190; Referee: Mike Roncone |

| 10 August 2021 | Hibernian B | 1–2 | Elgin City | Edinburgh |
| 19:45 | Aitken 89' | | Hester 30', 51' | Stadium: Christie Gillies Park; Attendance: 100; Referee: Calum Scott |

| 10 August 2021 | Brora Rangers | 0–1 | Aberdeen B | Brora |
| 19:45 | | | Ruth 70' | Stadium: Dudgeon Park; Attendance: 150; Referee: Dan McFarlane |

| 10 August 2021 | Forfar Athletic | 1–0 | Formartine United | Forfar |
| 19:45 | Aitken 12' | | | Stadium: Station Park; Attendance: 255; Referee: Alan Newlands |

| 11 August 2021 | Dundee B | 1–2 | Peterhead | Forfar |
| 19:45 | Panter 35' | | Payne 37', 70' | Stadium: Station Park; Referee: Scott Lambie |

| 11 August 2021 | Brechin City | 1–3 | Buckie Thistle | Brechin |
| 20:00 | Bollan 51' | | Morrison 34'; Urquhart 75'; Murray 90' | Stadium: Glebe Park; Attendance: 285; Referee: Graham Grainger |

| Ross County B | w/o | Stirling Albion |

=== South Section ===
==== Draw ====
Teams that entered the competition in the first round.

| Seeded Teams | Unseeded Teams |
|---|---|
| Falkirk; Clyde; Dumbarton; Queen's Park; Edinburgh City; Stranraer; Albion Rovers; Annan Athletic; Kelty Hearts | East Kilbride; Bonnyrigg Rose; Broomhill; Celtic B; Heart of Midlothian B; Livingston B; Motherwell B; Rangers B; St Mirren B |

==== Matches ====
| 10 August 2021 | Stranraer | 3–0 (awarded) | Motherwell B | Stranraer |
| 19:30 | | | | Stadium: Stair Park |

| 10 August 2021 | St Mirren B | 1–1 (3–0 p) | Kelty Hearts | Paisley |
| 19:45 | Jack 89' | | Tidser 69' | Stadium: St Mirren Park; Attendance: 372; Referee: Chris Graham |
| | Penalties |
| | Offord (penalty scored); McDonald (penalty missed); McMaster (penalty scored); Jack (penalty scored) | | (penalty missed) Barjonas; (penalty missed) Biabi; (penalty missed) Cardle |

| 10 August 2021 | Queen's Park | 1–1 (5–4 p) | Bonnyrigg Rose Athletic | Glasgow |
| 20:15 | Gillespie 75' (pen.) | | Hoskins 61' | Stadium: Firhill Stadium; Attendance: 318; Referee: Lloyd Wilson |
| | Penalties |
| | Gillespie (penalty scored); Longridge (penalty scored); McHugh (penalty missed); Robson (penalty scored); Murray (penalty scored); Doyle (penalty scored) | | (penalty scored) Currie; (penalty scored) Evans; (penalty missed) Young; (penalty scored) Turner; (penalty scored) Hunter; (penalty missed) Gray |

| 11 August 2021 | Falkirk | 3–0 | East Kilbride | Falkirk |
| 19:30 | Old 31' (o.g.); Ross 57'; Keena 72' | | | Stadium: Falkirk Stadium; Attendance: 1,120; Referee: Lorraine Watson |

| 11 August 2021 | Dumbarton | 2–3 | Rangers B | Dumbarton |
| 19:45 | Buchanan 88'; Stokes 89' | | Hastie 20'; Lowry 25'; Weston 76' | Stadium: Dumbarton Football Stadium; Attendance: 259; Referee: Steven Reid |

| 11 August 2021 | Celtic B | 2–0 | Annan Athletic | Airdrie |
| 19:45 | O'Connor 3'; S.Robertson 75' | | | Stadium: Excelsior Stadium; Referee: Matthew MacDermid |

| 11 August 2021 | Broomhill | 1–0 | Clyde | Alloa |
| 19:45 | Alexander 21' | | | Stadium: Recreation Park; Attendance: 144; Referee: Duncan Williams |

| 17 August 2021 | Edinburgh City | 0–1 | Heart of Midlothian B | Edinburgh |
| 19:45 | | | Henderson 44' (pen.) | Stadium: Ainslie Park; Attendance: 272; Referee: Lloyd Wilson |

| Livingston B | w/o | Albion Rovers |

Notes

1. A: Livingston and Ross County were unable to field B teams for the first round and withdrew from the competition.
2. B: Stranraer were awarded a 3–0 win over Motherwell B who were unable to fulfil the fixture as a number of players were self-isolating due to the COVID-19 pandemic in Scotland.
3. C: Originally due to start at 19:45, kick-off in the Queen's Park vs Bonnyrigg Rose Athletic match was delayed by 30 minutes due to traffic congestion around Firhill Stadium.

== Second round ==
The second round featured the 18 first round winners who were joined by all teams from the 2020–21 Scottish Championship and the top four teams from the 2020–21 Scottish League One.

The draw was made on 6 July 2021 at 14:00 and was broadcast live on the SPFL YouTube Channel. The draw was regionalised and seeded. Matches were played on 31 August, 3, 4, 5 and 14 September 2021.

=== North section ===
==== Draw ====
Teams that entered the competition in the second round.

| Seeded Teams | Unseeded Teams |
|---|---|
| Raith Rovers; Dunfermline Athletic; Inverness Caledonian Thistle; Arbroath; Alloa Athletic; Cove Rangers; Montrose | 9 first round winners |

==== Matches ====
| 4 September 2021 | Montrose | 1–0 | Stirling Albion | Montrose |
| 13:30 | Webster 4' (pen.) | | | Stadium: Links Park; Attendance: 491; Referee: Chris Fordyce |

| 4 September 2021 | Aberdeen B | 1–1 (4–1 p) | Arbroath | Aberdeen |
| 15:00 | Ruth 74' | | Henderson 90+4' | Stadium: Pittodrie Stadium; Attendance: 650; Referee: Chris Graham |
| | Penalties |
| | Mykyta (penalty scored); Ruth (penalty scored); Duncan (penalty scored); Hanratty (penalty scored) | | (penalty missed) Henderson; (penalty scored) Hamilton; (penalty missed) Craigen |

| 4 September 2021 | Cove Rangers | 0–0 (4–2 p) | Stenhousemuir | Aberdeen |
| 15:00 | | | | Stadium: Balmoral Stadium; Attendance: 324; Referee: Barry Cook |
| | Penalties |
| | McAllister (penalty scored); Yule (penalty scored); Leitch (penalty scored); Megginson (penalty scored) | | (penalty missed) Forbes; (penalty missed) Coll; (penalty scored) O'Reilly; (penalty scored) Brown |

| 4 September 2021 | Cowdenbeath | 0–2 | Alloa Athletic | Cowdenbeath |
| 15:00 | | | Boyd 45+1'; Scougall 79' | Stadium: Cowdenbeath; Attendance: 292; Referee: Dan McFarlane |

| 4 September 2021 | Raith Rovers | 1–0 | Forfar Athletic | Kirkcaldy |
| 15:00 | Riley-Snow 25' | | | Stadium: Stark's Park; Attendance: 842; Referee: Matthew McDermid |

| 4 September 2021 | Elgin City | 3–0 (awarded) | Dunfermline Athletic | Elgin |
| 15:00 | | | | Stadium: Borough Briggs |

| 4 September 2021 | Inverness Caledonian Thistle | 4–0 | Buckie Thistle | Inverness |
| 15:00 | Jamieson 24'; Harper 67'; McKay 81', 90' | | | Stadium: Caledonian Stadium; Attendance: 902; Referee: Calum Scott |

| 4 September 2021 | Peterhead | 0–1 | East Fife | Peterhead |
| 15:00 | | | Denholm 10' | Stadium: Balmoor Stadium; Attendance: 358; Referee: Stewart Luke |

Notes

1. D: Elgin City were awarded a technical 3–0 win over Dunfermline Athletic who were unable to fulfil the fixture as a number of players were self-isolating due to the COVID-19 pandemic in Scotland.

=== South section ===
==== Draw ====
Teams that entered the competition in the second round.

| Seeded Teams | Unseeded Teams |
|---|---|
| Kilmarnock; Hamilton Academical; Queen of the South; Ayr United; Greenock Morton; Partick Thistle; Airdrieonians | 9 first round winners |

==== Matches ====
| 31 August 2021 | Hamilton Academical | 3–2 | Heart of Midlothian B | Hamilton |
| 19:45 | Virtanen 5'; Spence 71'; Ryan 78' | | Kirk 61'; Denholm 63' | Stadium: New Douglas Park; Attendance: 409; Referee: Chris Graham |

| 3 September 2021 | Airdrieonians | 1–1 (4–5 p) | Queen's Park | Airdrie |
| 19:45 | Smith 49' | | Gillespie 86' (pen.) | Stadium: Excelsior Stadium; Attendance: 460; Referee: Grant Irvine |
| | Penalties |
| | McCabe (penalty scored); Agnew (penalty scored); McGill (penalty scored); Watson (penalty scored); Easton (penalty missed); Frizzell (penalty missed) | | Brown (penalty scored); Longridge (penalty scored); Robson (penalty missed); Gillespie (penalty scored); Murray (penalty scored); Doyle (penalty scored) |

| 4 September 2021 | Stranraer | 0–2 | Partick Thistle | Stranraer |
| 13:00 | | | Akinola 12'; Holt 90+2' | Stadium: Stair Park; Attendance: 598; Referee: Craig Napier |

| 4 September 2021 | Albion Rovers | 6–0 | St Mirren B | Coatbridge |
| 13:30 | Clocherty 3' (o.g.); Doherty 23', 44' (pen.), 59', 64'; Dolan 90' | | | Stadium: Cliftonhill; Attendance: 317; Referee: Lloyd Wilson |

| 4 September 2021 | Celtic B | 1–3 | Greenock Morton | Airdrie |
| 15:00 | Dickson 29' | | Garrity 16'; Muirhead 26'; Blues 66' | Stadium: Excelsior Stadium; Referee: Mike Roncone |

| 4 September 2021 | Kilmarnock | 3–1 | Falkirk | Kilmarnock |
| 15:00 | Murray 4', 78'; Naismith 55' | | Nesbitt 8' | Stadium: Rugby Park; Attendance: 2,447; Referee: Alan Newlands |

| 5 September 2021 | Queen of the South | 3–0 | Broomhill | Dumfries |
| 14:00 | Paton 7' (pen.); Connelly 62'; Gibson 78' (pen.) | | | Stadium: Palmerston Park; Attendance: 717; Referee: Peter Stuart |

| 14 September 2021 | Rangers B | 3–0 (awarded) | Ayr United | Dumbarton |
| 19:30 | | | O'Connor 40'; Chalmers 74'; Fjørtoft 78' | Stadium: Dumbarton Football Stadium; Referee: Steven Reid |

Notes

1. E: Rangers B were awarded a technical 3–0 win over Ayr United who fielded two ineligible players. The match had originally finished 3–0 to Ayr United.

== Final stages ==
On 7 July 2021, a bracket was published for the rest of the tournament, from the third round (last 16) onwards.

=== Bracket ===
Third round
6 October 2021
Hamilton Academical | 2
Aberdeen B | 0
8 October 2021
Kilmarnock | 3
Queen's Park | 1
9 October 2021
Elgin City | 2
Inverness CT | 4
9 October 2021
Raith Rovers | 3
East Fife | 1
9 October 2021
Cove Rangers | 4
Albion Rovers | 1
27 October 2021
Alloa Athletic | 2
Rangers B | 3
8 October 2021
Queen of the South | 2
Partick Thistle | 0
9 October 2021
Montrose | 0 (2)
Greenock Morton | 0 (4)

Quarter-finals
30 November 2021
Hamilton Academical | 2
Kilmarnock | 3
30 November 2021
Inverness CT | 0 (4)
Raith Rovers | 0 (5)
30 November 2021
Cove Rangers | 5
Rangers B | 1
1 December 2021
Queen of the South | 2
Greenock Morton | 1

Semi-finals
2 March 2022
Kilmarnock | 1
Raith Rovers | 2
1 March 2022
Cove Rangers | 0
Queen of the South | 1

Final
3 April 2022
Raith Rovers | 3
Queen of the South | 1

=== Third round ===
The third round featured the 16 second round winners and matches were played on 6, 8, 9 and 27 October 2021.

==== Matches ====
| 6 October 2021 | Hamilton Academical | 2–0 | Aberdeen B | Hamilton |
| 19:45 | McGowan 37'; Munro 66' | | | Stadium: New Douglas Park; Attendance: 363; Referee: Steven Kirkland |

| 8 October 2021 | Kilmarnock | 3–1 | Queen's Park | Kilmarnock |
| 19:45 | Shaw 14'; E. Murray 53'; Hendry 61' | | Gillespie 50' (pen.) | Stadium: Rugby Park; Attendance: 2,149; Referee: Alan Muir |

| 8 October 2021 | Queen of the South | 2–0 | Partick Thistle | Dumfries |
| 19:45 | Connelly 69'; Roy 90' | | | Stadium: Palmerston Park; Attendance: 1,043; Referee: Alan Newlands |

| 9 October 2021 | Raith Rovers | 3–1 | East Fife | Kirkcaldy |
| 13:00 | Tait 35'; Connolly 39'; Poplatnik 62' | | Mercer 37' | Stadium: Stark's Park; Attendance: 1,177; Referee: Mike Roncone |

| 9 October 2021 | Montrose | 0–0 (2–4 p) | Greenock Morton | Montrose |
| 13:30 | | | | Stadium: Links Park; Attendance: 476; Referee: Lloyd Wilson |
| | Penalties |
| | Webster (penalty missed); Whatley (penalty scored); Milne (penalty scored); Steeves (penalty missed) | | (penalty scored) Knowles; (penalty scored) Reilly; (penalty missed) Lithgow; (penalty scored) Blues; (penalty scored) Oliver |

| 9 October 2021 | Cove Rangers | 4–1 | Albion Rovers | Aberdeen |
| 14:00 | Megginson 79'; McAllister 82', 89'; Masson 86' | | Wright 90+1' | Stadium: Balmoral Stadium; Attendance: 327; Referee: Graham Grainger |

| 9 October 2021 | Elgin City | 2–4 | Inverness Caledonian Thistle | Elgin |
| 14:00 | Grivosti 9'; Cameron 22' | | Mckay 38', 40', 68'; Jamieson 72' | Stadium: Borough Briggs; Attendance: 1,348; Referee: Barry Cook |

| 27 October 2021 | Alloa Athletic | 2–3 | Rangers B | Alloa |
| 19:45 | Niang 8'; Trouten 40' | | Alegría 30', 34', 62' | Stadium: Recreation Park; Attendance: 234; Referee: Calum Scott |

=== Quarter-finals ===
The quarter-finals were played on 30 November and 1 December 2021.

==== Matches ====
| 30 November 2021 | Hamilton Academical | 2–3 | Kilmarnock | Hamilton |
| 19:45 | Moyo 68'; Ryan 86' (pen.) | | Armstrong 53'; Sanders 89', 90+4' | Stadium: New Douglas Park; Attendance: 829; Referee: Steven Kirkland |

| 30 November 2021 | Inverness Caledonian Thistle | 0–0 (4–5 p) | Raith Rovers | Inverness |
| 19:45 | | | | Stadium: Caledonian Stadium; Attendance: 670; Referee: Barry Cook |
| | Penalties |
| | Doran (penalty scored); Harper (penalty scored); Deas (penalty missed); Jamieson (penalty scored); Allardice (penalty scored); Sutherland (penalty missed) | | (penalty scored) Tait; (penalty scored) Berra; (penalty missed) Matthews; (penalty scored) Varian; (penalty scored) Connolly; (penalty scored) Dick |

| 30 November 2021 | Cove Rangers | 5–1 | Rangers B | Aberdeen |
| 19:45 | Fyvie 3', 35'; Megginson 5' (pen.); Masson 14'; McIntosh 67' | | Fraser 10' | Stadium: Balmoral Stadium; Attendance: 562; Referee: Mike Roncone |

| 1 December 2021 | Queen of the South | 2–1 | Greenock Morton | Dumfries |
| 19:30 | Hamilton 27' (o.g.); Paton 88' | | Lithgow 86' | Stadium: Palmerston Park; Attendance: 525; Referee: Alan Newlands |

=== Semi-finals ===
The semi-finals are to be played on 1 and 2 March 2022.

==== Matches ====
| 1 March 2022 | Cove Rangers | 0–1 | Queen of the South | Aberdeen |
| 19:30 | | | Fitzpatrick 2' | Stadium: Balmoral Stadium; Attendance: 728; Referee: David Dickinson |

| 2 March 2022 | Kilmarnock | 1–2 | Raith Rovers | Kilmarnock |
| 19:30 | Shaw 43' (pen.) | | Matthews 66'; Waters 87' (o.g.) | Stadium: Rugby Park; Attendance: 2,118; Referee: Grant Irvine |

== Final ==
The final took place on 3 April 2022.

3 April 2022
16:15

| Raith Rovers | 3–1 | Queen of the South |
|---|---|---|
| Poplatnik 16', 70'; Ross 78' | | Roy 45' |

Excelsior Stadium, Airdrie
Attendance: 4,452
Referee: Grant Irvine

== Notes ==
Notes

1. Note 1: The 2020–21 tournament was cancelled due to the COVID-19 pandemic in Scotland.
