= 2016–17 Hamilton Academical F.C. season =

Hamilton Academical
2016–17 season
- Chairman: Les Gray
- Manager: Martin Canning
- Stadium: New Douglas Park
- Scottish Premiership: 11th
- Scottish Cup: Quarter-final
- Scottish League Cup: Second round
- Top goalscorer: League: Ali Crawford (8); All: Ali Crawford (10)
- Highest home attendance: 5,292 vs. Rangers, Premiership, 16 December 2016
- Lowest home attendance: 764 vs. Livingston, League Cup, 30 July 2016
- Average home league attendance: 2,439
Home colours	Away colours

The 2016–17 season was the club's third season in the Scottish Premiership. Hamilton also competed in the Scottish Cup and the League Cup. Hamilton secured their top flight status for the 2017–18 season by beating Dundee United 1–0 on aggregate in the Premiership play-off final.

== Summary ==
=== Management ===
The club began the 2016–17 season under the continued management of Martin Canning who also extended his own playing contract, staying as the player-manager for the club.

After saving the club from relegation through the play-offs, manager Martin Canning thanked the board for sticking with him throughout the season.

== Results & fixtures ==
Win Draw Loss Postponed

=== Scottish Premiership ===
6 August 2016 1	Rangers	1–1	Hamilton Academical	Ibrox Stadium
12:30	Waghorn 62'	BBC; SPFL	Crawford 30'; Devlin (yellow card) 35'; Sarris (yellow card) 37'; Kurakins (yellow card) 39'; Crawford (yellow card) 45'; Donati (yellow card) 53'	Attendance: 49,125; Referee: Don Robertson

13 August 2016 2	Hamilton Academical	1–2	Kilmarnock	SuperSeal Stadium
15:00	Longridge 26'; Gillespie (yellow card) 75'	BBC; SPFL	Boyd 71'; Coulibaly 73'; Green (yellow card) 51'; Boyle (yellow card) 52'; McKenzie (yellow card) 89'	Attendance: 2,228; Referee: Steven McLean

19 August 2016 3	Dundee	1–1	Hamilton Academical	Dens Park
19:45	O'Hara 17'; Etxabeguren (yellow card) 42'	BBC; SPFL	Lyon 13'; Lyon (yellow card) 62'; Donati (yellow card) 74'	Attendance: 5,287; Referee: Kevin Clancy

27 August 2016 4	Hamilton Academical	1–0	Ross County	SuperSeal Stadium
15:00	Imrie 74'; Redmond (yellow card) 62'; Gillespie (yellow card) 63'; Docherty (yellow card) 70'	BBC; SPFL	McEveley (yellow card) 26'; Quinn (yellow card) 87'	Attendance: 1,609; Referee: Greg Aitken

10 September 2016 5	Hearts	3–1	Hamilton Academical	Tynecastle Stadium
15:00	Walker 69' 81' (pen.); Nicholson 90'; Watt (yellow card) 30'; Paterson (yellow card) 87'; Rossi (yellow card) 49'	BBC; SPFL	Crawford 50'; Want (yellow card) 80'; Imrie (yellow card) 81'; Crawford (yellow card) 90'	Attendance: 15,947; Referee: Craig Thomson

17 September 2016 6	Motherwell	4–2	Hamilton Academical	Fir Park
15:00	Moult 8', 13', 21', 50' (pen.); McManus (yellow card) 79'; Lasley (yellow card) 88'; Clay (yellow card) 90'	BBC; SPFL	Crawford 36', 64'; Donati (yellow card) 23'; Gillespie (yellow card) 54'; Imrie (yellow card) 75'; Devlin (yellow card) 80'	Attendance: 4,514; Referee: William Collum

25 September 2016 7	Hamilton Academical	1–1	St Johnstone	SuperSeal Stadium
15:00	Docherty 37'; Donati (yellow card) 58'; Doherty (yellow card) 63'; MacKinnon (yellow card) 70'; Seaborne (yellow card) 78'; Crawford (yellow card) 90'	BBC; SPFL	Craig 82'; Davidson (yellow card) 33'	Attendance: 1,705; Referee: Euan Anderson

1 October 2016 8	Hamilton Academical	1–1	Inverness Caledonian Thistle	SuperSeal Stadium
15:00	D'Acol 18'; Imrie (yellow card) 85'	BBC; SPFL	Polworth 90'; Doumbouya (yellow card) 61'	Attendance: 1,611; Referee: Barry Cook

15 October 2016 9	Partick Thsitle	2–2	Hamilton Academical	Firhill Stadium
15:00	Edwards 21'; Lindsay 42'; Gordon (yellow card) 54'	BBC; SPFL	Donati 14'; Brophy 83'; Sarris (yellow card) 39'; Doherty (yellow card) 57'	Attendance: 2,843; Referee: Greg Aitken

25 October 2016 10	Hamilton Academical	1–0	Aberdeen	SuperSeal Stadium
19:45	D'Acol 6' (pen.)	BBC; SPFL		Attendance: 2,315; Referee: William Collum

29 October 2016 11	Hamilton Academical	0–1	Dundee	SuperSeal Stadium
15:00	Imrie (yellow card) 56'; Kurtaj (yellow card) 72'	BBC; SPFL	McGowan 62'; Hateley (yellow card) 32'	Attendance: 1,853; Referee: Stephen Finch

5 November 2016 12	Kilmarnock	0–0	Hamilton Academical	Rugby Park
15:00	Burn (yellow card) 37'; Jones (yellow card) 51'	Report	Gillespie (yellow card) 5'; Sarris (yellow card) 77'	Attendance: 3,387; Referee: (Scotland) Euan Anderson

21 November 2016 13	Hamilton Academical	3–3	Heart of Midlothian	SuperSeal Stadium
19:45	Crawford 24' (yellow card) 90+3'; Bingham 46' 68'	Report	Walker 8' 73' (pen.); Paterson 86'; Öztürk (yellow card) 90'; Rherras (yellow card) 90+1'	Attendance: 2,339; Referee: (Scotland) Steven McLean

26 November 2016 14	Ross County	1–1	Hamilton Academical	Global Energy Stadium
15:00	Boyce 39'; Schalk (yellow card) 59'; Chow (yellow card) 90+1'; Routis (yellow card) 90+1'	Report	Seaborne (yellow card) 5'; Crawford 77'; Devlin (yellow card) 90+2'	Attendance: 3,275; Referee: (Scotland) Craig Thomson

3 December 2016 15	Hamilton Academical	1–1	Partick Thistle	SuperSeal Stadium
15:00	D'Acol 15'; Gillespie (yellow card) 40'; MacKinnon (yellow card) 50'; Crawford (yellow card) 84'; Seaborne (yellow card) 87'	Report	Welsh 61'; Lindsay (yellow card) 90'	Attendance: 2,210; Referee: (Scotland) Don Robertson

10 December 2016 16	Inverness Caledonian Thistle	1–1	Hamilton Academical	Tulloch Caledonian Stadium
15:00	Draper (yellow card) 36'; Cole 51'; Brad McKay (yellow card) 86'; King (yellow card) 90'	Report	Crawford 16'; Imrie (yellow card) 58'; Gillespie (yellow card) 74'; McMann (yellow card) 76'	Attendance: 2,473; Referee: (Scotland) Greg Aitken

13 December 2016 17	Celtic	1–0	Hamilton Academical	Celtic Park
19:45	Griffiths 36'; Sviatchenko (yellow card) 82'	Report	Donati (yellow card) 74'; Gillespie (yellow card) 80'	Attendance: 55,076; Referee: (Scotland) Crawford Allan

16 December 2016 18	Hamilton Academical	1–2	Rangers	SuperSeal Stadium
19:45	Sarris (yellow card) 10'; Imrie 77' (yellow card) 90'; MacKinnon (yellow card) 86'; Devlin (yellow card) 90+2'; McMann (yellow card) 90+3'	Report	Waghorn 45' 52'; Garner (yellow card) 90+2'	Attendance: 5,292; Referee: (Scotland) Alan Muir

24 December 2016 19	Hamilton Academical	0–3	Celtic	SuperSeal Stadium
12:30	McMann (yellow card) 35'; Devlin (yellow card) 39'; Donati (yellow card) 50'	Report	McGregor (yellow card) 26' (yellow-red card); Griffiths 41'; Armstrong 54'; Dembélé 84'	Attendance: 5,003; Referee: (Scotland) Willie Collum

27 December 2016 20	Aberdeen	2–1	Hamilton Academical	Pittodrie Stadium
15:00	Taylor 34'; Lewis (yellow card) 37'; Rooney 68'; Maddison (yellow card) 90'	Report	Imrie 38' (pen.) (yellow card) 45+2'; Sarris (yellow card) 58'; Devlin (yellow card) 87'; McMann (red card) 90+2'	Attendance: 13,131; Referee: (Scotland) Andrew Dallas

31 December 2016 21	Hamilton Academical	1–1	Motherwell	SuperSeal Stadium
13:00	Sarris (yellow card) 24'; D'Acol 54'; Kurtaj (yellow card) 56'	Report	Lucas (red card) 27'; McDonald (yellow card) 56'; Moult 90+3' (yellow card) 90+4'	Attendance: 3,526; Referee: (Scotland) Euan Anderson

28 January 2017 22	St Johnstone	3–0	Hamilton Academical	McDiarmid Park
15:00	Swanson (yellow card) 30'; Cummins 53' 59'; Davidson 74'	Report	Redmond (yellow card) 34'	Attendance: 3,279; Referee: (Scotland) Nick Walsh

31 January 2017 23	Hamilton Academical	3–0	Inverness Caledonian Thistle	SuperSeal Stadium
19:45	D'Acol 11'; Devlin (yellow card) 26'; Redmond (yellow card) 32'; Gillespie 47'; MacKinnon (yellow card) 54'; Bingham 61'	Report	Vigurs (yellow card) 30'; Tansey (yellow card) 39'	Attendance: 1,745; Referee: (Scotland) Euan Anderson

4 February 2017 24	Hamilton Academical	1–1	Kilmarnock	SuperSeal Stadium
15:00	Imrie (yellow card) 15'; Brophy 43'; Redmond (yellow card) 51'	Report	Longstaff 7'; Wilson (yellow card) 64'; Umerah (yellow card) 75'	Attendance: 2,159; Referee: (Scotland) Steven McLean

18 February 2017 25	Partick Thistle	2–0	Hamilton Academical	Firhill Stadium
15:00	Doolan 68' 79'; Lawless (yellow card) 81'	Report	Devlin (yellow card) 61'; Watson (yellow card) 64'; Skondras (yellow card) 76'	Attendance: 3,057; Referee: (Scotland) Willie Collum

25 February 2017 26	Celtic	2–0	Hamilton Academical	Celtic Park
15:00	Dembélé 45' 59' (pen.)	Report	Devlin (yellow card) 15'; Donati (yellow card) 59'; Kurtaj (yellow card) 78'; Skondras (yellow card) 90+2'	Attendance: 54,685; Referee: (Scotland) Crawford Allan

28 February 2017 27	Hamilton Academical	1–0	Aberdeen	SuperSeal Stadium
19:45	Devlin 9'; Skondras (yellow card) 52'; MacKinnon (yellow card) 83' (yellow-red card)	Report	Shinnie (yellow card) 72'	Attendance: 2,006; Referee: (Scotland) Steven McLean

11 March 2017 28	Heart of Midlothian	4–0	Hamilton Academical	Tynecastle Stadium
15:00	Djoum 45+2'; Esmaël Gonçalves 55'; Walker 58'; Martin 88'	Report	Bingham (yellow card) 40'; Skondras (yellow card) 57'; Gillespie (yellow card) 76'	Attendance: 15,881; Referee: (Scotland) Craig Thomson

18 March 2017 29	Rangers	4–0	Hamilton Academical	Ibrox Stadium
15:00	Hyndman 26'; Hill 41'; Waghorn 55' (pen.); Tavernier (yellow card) 57'; Wallace 74' (yellow card) 84'	Report	Redmond (yellow card) 36'; Gogić (yellow card) 49'	Attendance: 49,090; Referee: (Scotland) Don Robertson

1 April 2017 30	Hamilton Academical	1–0	St Johnstone	SuperSeal Stadium
15:00	Devlin (yellow card) 23'; Crawford (yellow card) 45+3'; D'Acol 89'	Report	Swanson (red card) 45+3'; Foster (red card) 45+3'; Cummins (yellow card) 83'	Attendance: 1,662; Referee: (Scotland) Don Robertson

5 April 2017 31	Motherwell	0–0	Hamilton Academical	Fir Park
19:45	Pearson (yellow card) 45+1'	Report	Skondras (yellow card) 59'; Mackinnon (red card) 74'; Sarris (yellow card) 80'	Attendance: 4,644; Referee: (Scotland) Kevin Clancy

8 April 2017 32	Hamilton Academical	1–1	Ross County	SuperSeal Stadium
15:00	Donati 3'; Bingham (yellow card) 15'; McMann (yellow card) 37'; Skondras (red card) 45+1'; Devlin (yellow card) 57'	Report	Curran 60'	Attendance: 1,548; Referee: (Scotland) Steven McLean

15 April 2017 33	Dundee	0–2	Hamilton Academical	Dens Park
15:00		Report	D'Acol 23' (pen.); Bingham (yellow card) 68'; Devlin 84'	Attendance: 6,489; Referee: (Scotland) John Beaton

29 April 2017 34	Hamilton Academical	0–2	Kilmarnock	SuperSeal Stadium
15:00		Report	Sammon 11'; Jones 23'	Attendance: 2,482; Referee: (Scotland) William Collum

6 May 2017 35	Inverness Caledonian Thistle	2–1	Hamilton Academical	Tulloch Caledonian Stadium
15:00	W McKay 10'; Tansey 36' (pen.)	Report	Redmond 90+4'	Attendance: 2,478; Referee: (Scotland) Andrew Dallas

13 May 2017 36	Hamilton Academical	0–1	Motherwell	SuperSeal Stadium
15:00		Report	Moult 66'	Attendance: 4,173; Referee: (Scotland) Kevin Clancy

16 May 2017 37	Ross County	3–2	Hamilton Academical	Global Energy Stadium
19:45	Gardyne 3'; Matthews 31' (o.g.); O'Brien (yellow card) 89'; Franks 90+1'; Boyce (yellow card) 90+3'	Report	Bingham 26'; Longridge (yellow card) 8'; MacKinnon (yellow card) 13'; Templeton 75'; Imrie (yellow card) 90'; Skondras (yellow card) 90+3'	Attendance: 4,871; Referee: (Scotland) Alan Muir

20 May 2017 38	Hamilton Academical	4–0	Dundee	SuperSeal Stadium
15:00	Bingham 23'; Skondras 25'; Imrie 56' (pen.); Gogić (yellow card) 58'; Crawford 76'	Report	El Bakhtaoui (yellow card) 84'	Attendance: 2,616; Referee: (Scotland) Crawford Allan

=== Premiership Play Off ===
25 May 2017 First Leg	Dundee United	0–0	Hamilton Academical	Tannadice Park
19:45	Murray (red card) 77'	Report		Attendance: 9,386; Referee: (Scotland) Steven McLean

28 May 2017 Second Leg	Hamilton Academical	1–0 (1–0 agg.)	Dundee United	SuperSeal Stadium
15:00	Docherty 64'	Report		Attendance: 5,027; Referee: (Scotland) Craig Thomson

=== Scottish League Cup ===
16 July 2016 Group G	Ayr United	2–1	Hamilton Academical	Somerset Park, Ayr
15:00	Forrest 2' (pen.); Crawford 49'; Adams (yellow card) 31'	SPFL Report	Longridge 90+4'; MacKinnon (yellow card) 2'; Devlin (yellow card) 61'	Attendance: 994; Referee: Willie Collum

23 July 2016 Group G	Hamilton Academical	3–0	St Mirren	New Douglas Park, Hamilton
15:00	Crawford 13'; Imrie 51'; Donati 70'; Devlin (yellow card) 83'	SPFL Report	Hutton (yellow card) 49'	Attendance: 1,379; Referee: Don Robertson

27 July 2016 Group G	Edinburgh City	2–4	Hamilton Academical	Meadowbank Stadium, Edinburgh
19:45	Allum 17', 19'; Gibson (yellow card) 53'; McFarland (yellow card) 65'	SPFL Report	Crawford 22'; D'Acol 26'; McGregor 66'; Imrie 71' (pen.); Crawford (yellow card) 59'	Attendance: 459; Referee: Colin Steven

30 July 2016 Group G	Hamilton Academical	2–1	Livingston	New Douglas Park, Hamilton
15:00	D'Acol 22'; Longridge 55'; Sarris (yellow card) 37'; McGregor (yellow card) 68'	SPFL Report	Matthews 41' (o.g.); Miller (yellow card) 85'	Attendance: 764; Referee: Euan Anderson

==== Knockout round ====
9 August 2016 Second round	Hamilton Academical	1–2	Greenock Morton	New Douglas Park, Hamilton
19:45	Imrie 8' (pen.)	SPFL Report	Forbes 59'; Quitongo 63'	Attendance: 1,112; Referee: Stephen Finnie

=== Scottish Cup ===
21 January 2017 Fourth round	Kilmarnock	0–1	Hamilton Academical	Kilmarnock
15:00		Report	Imrie (yellow card) 38'; Devlin (yellow card) 48'; Redmond (yellow card) 84'; Bingham 90+2' (pen.); MacKinnon (yellow card) 90+4'	Stadium: Rugby Park; Attendance: 2,944; Referee: (Scotland) Crawford Allan

11 February 2017 Fifth round	Dunfermline Athletic	1–1	Hamilton Academical	Dunfermline
15:00	McMullan 30'	Report	Redmond 74'	Stadium: East End Park; Attendance: 2,945; Referee: (Scotland) Craig Thomson (referee)

14 February 2017 Fifth round replay	Hamilton Academical	1–1 (a.e.t.) (3–0 p)	Dunfermline Athletic	Hamilton
19:45	Seaborne (yellow card) 18'; MacKinnon (yellow card) 33'; Redmond (yellow card) 83'; Bingham 87' (pen.); McMann (yellow card) 98'	Report	Morris 25'; McMullan (yellow card) 70'	Stadium: SuperSeal Stadium; Attendance: 1,222; Referee: (Scotland) Craig Thomson (referee)

4 March 2017 Quarter-final	Rangers	6–0	Hamilton Academical	Glasgow
12:30	Waghorn 33' (pen.); Garner 48' (yellow card) 56' (goal) 88' 90+1'; Jon Toral 77'; Hill 82'	Report		Stadium: Ibrox Stadium; Attendance: 27,287; Referee: (Scotland) John Beaton

== Squad statistics ==
=== Appearances ===
As of 20 May 2017

No.	Pos	Nat	Player	Total		Premiership		League Cup		Scottish Cup		Play-offs	
No.	Pos	Nat	Player	Apps	Goals	Apps	Goals	Apps	Goals	Apps	Goals	Apps	Goals
1	GK	(England) ENG	Remi Matthews	27	0	17	0	5	0	3	0	2	0
3	DF	(Greece) GRE	Giannis Skondras	18	1	11+2	1	0	0	2+1	0	2	0
4	DF	(Scotland) SCO	Michael Devlin	36	2	28	2	4	0	4	0	0	0
5	DF	(Scotland) SCO	Martin Canning	0	0	0	0	0	0	0	0	0	0
6	MF	(Scotland) SCO	Grant Gillespie	41	1	28+3	1	5	0	4	0	1	0
7	MF	(Scotland) SCO	Dougie Imrie	48	7	36+1	4	5	3	3+1	0	2	0
8	MF	(Scotland) SCO	Greg Docherty	37	2	23+6	1	4+1	0	0+1	0	1+1	1
9	FW	(Brazil) BRA	Alexandre D'Acol	35	9	24+5	7	4	2	1	0	0+1	0
10	MF	(England) ENG	Daniel Redmond	34	2	15+12	1	0+2	0	3	1	2	0
11	MF	(Scotland) SCO	Ali Crawford	42	10	31+2	8	5	2	2	0	2	0
12	MF	(Kosovo) KOS	Gramoz Kurtaj	17	0	5+9	0	0	0	2+1	0	0	0
14	DF	(Cyprus) CYP	Alex Gogić	9	0	3+4	0	0	0	0	0	2	0
15	FW	(England) ENG	Rakish Bingham	36	7	23+7	5	0	0	3+1	2	2	0
16	MF	(Scotland) SCO	Craig Watson	4	0	2	0	0	0	1+1	0	0	0
17	MF	(Scotland) SCO	Louis Longridge	24	3	9+7	1	5	2	0+1	0	0+2	0
18	MF	(Scotland) SCO	Darian MacKinnon	42	0	32+1	0	3+2	0	3	0	1	0
19	GK	(Scotland) SCO	Darren Jamieson	0	0	0	0	0	0	0	0	0	0
20	FW	(Scotland) SCO	Eamonn Brophy	31	2	7+21	2	0	0	2+1	0	0	0
21	MF	(Italy) ITA	Massimo Donati	40	3	26+5	2	3+1	1	3+1	0	1	0
22	MF	(Scotland) SCO	Darren Lyon	8	1	5+1	1	0+1	0	0	0	0+1	0
23	DF	(Scotland) SCO	Scott McMann	31	0	21+2	0	1+1	0	2+2	0	2	0
24	DF	(Spain) ESP	Jesús García Tena	1	0	0	0	1	0	0	0	0	0
25	DF	(Scotland) SCO	Ben Reilly	0	0	0	0	0	0	0	0	0	0
26	GK	(Scotland) SCO	Alex Marshall	0	0	0	0	0	0	0	0	0	0
27	DF	(Scotland) SCO	Shaun Want	2	0	0+2	0	0	0	0	0	0	0
28	FW	(Scotland) SCO	Ross Cunningham	4	0	0+2	0	0+1	0	0+1	0	0	0
31	FW	(Scotland) SCO	Ryan Tierney	2	0	0+2	0	0	0	0	0	0	0
32	DF	(Scotland) SCO	Jack Breslin	1	0	0	0	0+1	0	0	0	0	0
33	MF	(Scotland) SCO	Ronan Hughes	4	0	0+2	0	1+1	0	0	0	0	0
34	GK	(England) ENG	Gary Woods	22	0	21	0	0	0	1	0	0	0
37	FW	(Scotland) SCO	David Templeton	5	1	1+2	1	0	0	0	0	2	0
39	DF	(England) ENG	Blair Adams	7	0	2+3	0	0	0	2	0	0	0
89	DF	(Greece) GRE	Georgios Sarris	34	0	30	0	2	0	1	0	0+1	0
Players who left the club during the 2016–17 season
2	DF	(England) ENG	Danny Seaborne	13	0	10+1	0	0	0	2	0	0	0
3	DF	(Latvia) LAT	Antons Kurakins	5	0	1	0	4	0	0	0	0	0
14	FW	(Trinidad and Tobago) TTO	Richard Roy	2	0	0+1	0	0+1	0	0	0	0	0
29	DF	(Scotland) SCO	Jordan McGregor	3	1	0	0	2+1	1	0	0	0	0
30	MF	(Scotland) SCO	Steven Boyd	3	0	0	0	1+2	0	0	0	0	0
35	GK	(Scotland) SCO	Robbie Thomson	1	0	0+1	0	0	0	0	0	0	0
46	DF	(Germany) GER	Lennard Sowah	7	0	6+1	0	0	0	0	0	0	0
	MF	(Scotland) SCO	Sean McKirdy	0	0	0	0	0	0	0	0	0	0

== Team statistics ==
=== League table ===
Pos	Team	Pld	W	D	L	GF	GA	GD	Pts	Qualification or relegation (Note: Teams played each other three times (33 matches), before the league split into two groups (the top six and the bottom six) for the last five matches.)
8	Kilmarnock	38	9	14	15	36	56	−20	41	
9	Motherwell	38	10	8	20	46	69	−23	38	
10	Dundee	38	10	7	21	38	62	−24	37	
11	Hamilton Academical (O)	38	7	14	17	37	56	−19	35	Qualification for the Premiership play-off final
12	Inverness Caledonian Thistle (R)	38	7	13	18	44	71	−27	34	Relegation to the Scottish Championship

Source: Scottish Premiership, Soccerway
Rules for classification: 1) Points; 2) Goal difference; 3) Goals scored; 4) Play-off (only if deciding champion, UEFA competitions qualification and second stage group allocation).
(O) Play-off winners; (R) Relegated

=== League Cup Table ===
Pos	Team	Pld	W	PW	PL	L	GF	GA	GD	Pts	Qualification	HAM	AYR	STM	LIV	EDI
1	Hamilton Academical (Q)	4	3	0	0	1	10	5	+5	9	Qualification for the Second Round	—	—	3–0	2–1	—
2	Ayr United (Q)	4	3	0	0	1	5	2	+3	9	Qualification for the Second Round	2–1	—	—	—	1–0
3	St Mirren	4	3	0	0	1	7	5	+2	9		—	1–0	—	—	3–0
4	Livingston	4	1	0	0	3	6	7	−1	3		—	0–2	2–3	—	—
5	Edinburgh City	4	0	0	0	4	2	11	−9	0		2–4	—	—	0–3	—

Source: SPFL
(Q) Qualified to the phase indicated

== Transfers ==
=== In ===
Date	Position	Nationality	Name	From	Fee
13 July 2016	DF	(Scotland)	Jack Breslin	Celtic	Free transfer
14 July 2016	DF	(Scotland)	Jordan McGregor	Hibernian	Free transfer
14 July 2016	GK	(England)	Remi Matthews	Norwich City	Loan
18 July 2016	MF	(Italy)	Massimo Donati	Bari	Free transfer
27 July 2016	GK	(England)	Gary Woods	Leyton Orient	Free transfer
27 July 2016	DF	(Greece)	Georgios Sarris	Kayseri Erciyesspor	Free transfer
11 August 2016	MF	(Scotland)	Sean McKirdy	Heart of Midlothian	Free transfer
24 August 2016	DF	(England)	Danny Seaborne	Partick Thistle	Free transfer
2 September 2016	GK	(Scotland)	Robbie Thomson	Queen of the South	Free transfer
25 September 2016	GK	(Scotland)	Darren Jamieson	Livingston	Free transfer
12 October 2016	DF	(Germany)	Lennard Sowah	Hamburg	Free transfer
27 January 2017	DF	(England)	Blair Adams	Cambridge United	Free transfer
30 January 2017	DF	(Greece)	Giannis Skondras	PAOK	Free transfer
25 February 2017	MF	(Cyprus)	Alex Gogić	Swansea City	Free transfer
24 March 2017	MF	(Scotland)	David Templeton	Rangers	Free transfer

=== Out ===
Date	Position	Nationality	Name	To	Fee
11 July 2016	DF	(Scotland)	Ziggy Gordon	Partick Thistle	Free transfer
19 July 2016	GK	(Northern Ireland)	Michael McGovern	Norwich City	Free transfer
3 August 2016	GK	(Scotland)	Alan Martin	Dumbarton	Free transfer
19 August 2016	FW	(Scotland)	Steven Boyd	Albion Rovers	Loan
24 August 2017	DF	(Latvia)	Antons Kurakins	Free Agent	Released
3 January 2017	GK	(Scotland)	Robbie Thomson	Falkirk	Free transfer
9 January 2017	DF	(Germany)	Lennard Sowah	Heart of Midlothian	Free transfer
27 January 2017	FW	(Trinidad and Tobago)	Richard Roy	Broughty Athletic	Free transfer
31 January 2017	DF	(Scotland)	Jordan McGregor	Airdrieonians	Loan
17 February 2017	MF	(Scotland)	Sean McKirdy	Berwick Rangers	Loan
10 April 2017	DF	(England)	Danny Seaborne	Exeter City	Free transfer
