= Jordan McGregor =

Scottish footballer (born 1997)

Personal information
- Date of birth: 18 March 1997 (age 29)
- Place of birth: Falkirk, Scotland
- Height: 1.88 m (6 ft 2 in)
- Position: Central defender

Team information
- Current team: East Kilbride
- Number: 23

Youth career
- 2013–2015: Hibernian

Senior career*
Years	Team	Apps	(Gls)
2015–2016	Hibernian	0	(0)
2016	→ Berwick Rangers (loan)	16	(2)
2016–2018	Hamilton Academical	0	(0)
2017	→ Airdrieonians (loan)	8	(0)
2017	→ Airdrieonians (loan)	16	(1)
2018	Airdrieonians	11	(0)
2018–2019	Aberdeen	0	(0)
2019–2024	Stirling Albion	141	(6)
2024–	East Kilbride	41	(1)
- * Club domestic league appearances and goals as of 4 May 2026

Jordan McGregor (born 18 March 1997) is a Scottish professional footballer who plays as a central defender for Scottish League One club East Kilbride. He has previously played for Hibernian, Hamilton Academical, Airdrieonians and Stirling Albion, as well as Berwick Rangers on loan.

== Career ==
After beginning his career with Hibernian, McGregor moved on loan to Berwick Rangers in January 2016. He signed for Hamilton Academical in July 2016. He made his debut for Hamilton in a 3–0 victory against St Mirren in the League Cup on 23 July 2016, alongside fellow debutantes Massimo Donati and Jack Breslin.

McGregor joined Airdrieonians in January 2017 on a loan deal until the end of the season.

In March 2017, McGregor signed a contract extension with Hamilton until May 2018.

On 17 August 2017, it was announced that McGregor would re-join Airdrie on loan for the first half of the season, alongside Hamilton teammate Ryan Tierney. At the completion of his loan deal, McGregor signed a contract with Airdrieonians until the end of the season.

On 31 August 2018, McGregor signed for Aberdeen reserves after impressing on trial. He joined Stirling Albion in January 2019.

== Career statistics ==
As of match played 06 November 2021

Appearances and goals by club, season and competition
Club	Season	League			Scottish Cup		League Cup		Other		Total	
Club	Season	Division	Apps	Goals	Apps	Goals	Apps	Goals	Apps	Goals	Apps	Goals
Hibernian	2015–16	Scottish Championship	0	0	0	0	0	0	0	0	0	0
Berwick Rangers (loan)	2015–16	Scottish League Two	16	2	0	0	0	0	0	0	16	2
Hamilton Academical	2016–17	Scottish Premiership	0	0	0	0	3	1	0	0	3	1
Hamilton Academical	2017–18	Scottish Premiership	0	0	0	0	0	0	1 (Note: Appearance(s) in the Scottish Challenge Cup)	0	1	0
Hamilton Academical	Total		0	0	0	0	3	1	1	0	4	1
Airdrieonians (loan)	2016–17	Scottish League One	8	0	0	0	0	0	0	0	8	0
Airdrieonians (loan)	2017–18	Scottish League One	16	1	1	1	0	0	0	0	17	2
Airdrieonians	2017–18	Scottish League One	11	0	0	0	0	0	0	0	11	0
Aberdeen	2018–19	Scottish Premiership	0	0	0	0	0	0	0	0	0	0
Stirling Albion	2018–19	Scottish League Two	12	1	0	0	0	0	0	0	12	1
Stirling Albion	2019–20	Scottish League Two	23	3	2	0	4	0	0	0	29	3
Stirling Albion	2020–21	Scottish League Two	18	0	0	0	4	0	0	0	22	0
Stirling Albion	2021–22	Scottish League Two	11	0	1	1	4	1	0	0	16	2
Stirling Albion	Total		64	4	3	1	12	1	0	0	79	6
Career total			115	7	4	2	15	2	1	0	135	11
