= Giannis Skondras =

Greek footballer (born 1990)

Personal information
- Full name: Ioannis Skondras
- Date of birth: 21 February 1990 (age 36)
- Place of birth: Trikala, Greece
- Height: 1.82 m (5 ft 11 1/2 in)
- Position: Right-back

Team information
- Current team: Trikala

Senior career*
Years	Team	Apps	(Gls)
2008–2013	Atromitos	93	(3)
2013–2016	PAOK	63	(2)
2016–2018	Hamilton Academical	34	(4)
2018–2022	Lamia	91	(2)
2022–2023	P.O. Fiki	21	(4)

International career^{‡}
2006–2007	Greece U17	3	(0)
2008–2009	Greece U19	4	(0)
2009–2012	Greece U21	13	(0)
- * Club domestic league appearances and goals as of 12 April 2023 ‡ National team caps and goals as of 17 August 2013

Giannis Skondras (Greek: Γιάννης Σκόνδρας; born 21 February 1990) is a Greek professional footballer who plays as a right-back for P.O. Fiki.

== Career ==
=== Atromitos ===
Skondras began his career in 2004 with Asklipios Trikalon and joined after only one year in July 2005 with Atromitos. In July 2008 was promoted to the senior team who played in the Beta Ethniki here earned his first professional match on 30 November 2009 against Diagoras.

Skondras gave a solid performance for Atromitos in 2011/12 Greek Cup where he virtually kept then top-scorer Kevin Mirallas quiet for most of the evening; a display that prompted plenty of interest from the Olympiakos brass. The Greece U-21 international was rumored to be on his way to the Giorgos Karaiskakis Stadium this past summer as doubt over Vasilis Torosidis’ future at the club circled the port city. When speculation regarding Torosidis' departure for Roma died down, the pursuit of Skondras was abandoned for a while.

=== PAOK ===
On 21 June 2013, Skondras, left Atromitos to sign a four-year contract with PAOK for the sum of €300.000.

He made his debut with the club on 17 August 2013 in a 3–0 home win against Xanthi. On 16 April 2014 in a semi-final for the Greek Cup against Olympiakos where the game is held up for over an hour after fans throw hundreds of flares onto the pitch and set fire to a dug outs has a key role in a 1–0 win following a 2–1 defeat in the first leg in Athens helping PAOK eventually went through the final. Giannis Skondras experienced two defeats in Greek Cup finals during his spell at Atromitos. His third attempt to silverware –with the black-and-white kit this time round- is nearing and he believes that he will be lucky that time. Unfortunately, Skondras did not manage to win the Greek Cup in his third presence on it as his club lost 1–4 against Panathinaikos. In a mediocre 2014–15 season with the club, he had his best professional year so far with 37 appearances (2 goals, 7 assists) in all competitions.

On 8 October 2015, rumour transfers for a possible move of the player in the rivals Panathinaikos, are rejected by the club as the Greens do not intend to make a move for the 25-year-old right back since they want to support the players that are already chosen (Jens Wemmer, Nikos Marinakis and Christos Bourbos) for the teams' roster. The 2016–17 season did not start well for the 26-year-old international as the Serbian manager Vladimir Ivić did not include him in his team's pre-season squad (along with Erik Sabo, Terry Antonis, Panagiotis Deligiannidis) and it seems that Giannis Skondras will be finally released from the Greek club this summer, after three seasons and 93 official performances with two goals. On 26 January 2017, PAOK officially announced the mutual termination of the Greek right defender contract, six-month before its actual expiration.

=== Hamilton Academical ===
Skondras signed a short-term contract with Scottish Premiership club Hamilton Academical in January 2017. On 8 April 2017, in his 8th appearance for the club, he was dismissed just before half time for a foul on the counter-attacking Ryan Dow at home to Ross County. The decision was later overturned following an appeal. On 20 May 2017, Skondras scored his first goal for the club with a thunderous long-range strike in a 4–0 win against Dundee, a result that meant Hamilton avoided automatic relegation to the Scottish Championship. Accies announced in June 2017 that Skondras had decided to leave, but he changed his mind and signed a new one-year contract in July.

On 16 December 2017, in a 3–2 home win against Ross County, following a foul by Hamilton's Georgios Sarris on Davis Keillor-Dunn which led to a touchline confrontation between players from both sides, Skondras was sent-off having raised a hand towards Ross County defender Kenny van der Weg. During the incident he also appeared to man-handle an assistant referee. Two days later he was charged with excessive misconduct by the Scottish Football Association.

On 30 March 2018, Skondras was released by Hamilton.

=== Lamia ===
On 4 September 2018, Skondras returned to the Super League, joining Lamia on a free transfer. On 11 November 2019, he scored a brace in a crucial 3–0 away win against AEL.

== Career statistics ==
As of match played 20 January 2022

Appearances and goals by club, season and competition
Club	Season	League			Cup		League Cup		Europe		Other		Total	
Club	Season	Division	Apps	Goals	Apps	Goals	Apps	Goals	Apps	Goals	Apps	Goals	Apps	Goals
Atromitos	2008–09	Beta Ethniki	14	0	0	0	—		—		0	0	14	0
Atromitos	2009–10	Super League Greece	7	0	2	0	—		—		0	0	9	0
Atromitos	2010–11	Super League Greece	12	0	5	0	—		—		0	0	17	0
Atromitos	2011–12	Super League Greece	27	1	5	0	—		—		0	0	32	1
Atromitos	2012–13	Super League Greece	33	2	1	0	—		2 (Note: Appearances in the Europa League)	0	0	0	36	2
Atromitos	Total		93	3	13	0	—		2	0	0	0	108	3
PAOK	2013–14	Super League Greece	22	0	6	0	—		3 (Note: One appearance in the Champions League and two in the Europa League)	0	0	0	31	0
PAOK	2014–15	Super League Greece	28	2	2	0	—		7	0	0	0	37	2
PAOK	2015–16	Super League Greece	13	0	5	0	—		7	0	0	0	25	0
PAOK	Total		63	2	13	0	—		17	0	0	0	93	2
Hamilton Academical	2016–17	Scottish Premiership	13	1	3	0	0	0	—		2 (Note: Appearances in the Premiership play-offs)	0	18	1
Hamilton Academical	2017–18	Scottish Premiership	21	3	0	0	2	0	—		—		23	3
Hamilton Academical	Total		34	4	3	0	2	0	0	0	2	0	41	4
Lamia	2018–19	Super League Greece	22	0	7	0	—		—		—		29	0
Lamia	2019–20	Super League Greece	31	2	3	0	—		—		—		35	2
Lamia	2020–21	Super League Greece	25	0	0	0	—		—		—		25	0
Lamia	2021–22	Super League Greece	12	0	0	0	—		—		—		12	0
Lamia	Total		90	2	10	0	—		0	0	—		100	4
Career total			280	11	39	0	2	0	19	0	2	0	343	11

== Honours ==
Atromitos

- Greek Cup runner-up: 2010–11, 2011–12

PAOK

- Greek Cup runner-up: 2013–14
