= Daniel Redmond =

English footballer

Personal information
- Full name: Daniel Stephen Redmond
- Date of birth: 2 March 1991 (age 35)
- Place of birth: Liverpool, England
- Positions: Midfielder; left back

Team information
- Current team: The New Saints
- Number: 10

Youth career
- –2009: Everton
- 2009–2011: Wigan Athletic

Senior career*
Years	Team	Apps	(Gls)
2011–2014	Wigan Athletic	0	(0)
2012	→ Hamilton Academical (loan)	18	(5)
2014	→ Carlisle United (loan)	15	(0)
2014–2018	Hamilton Academical	86	(5)
2018–	The New Saints	226	(16)
- * Club domestic league appearances and goals as of 06:42, 7 November 2026 (UTC)

Daniel Stephen Redmond (born 2 March 1991) is an English professional footballer, who plays as a midfielder for Cymru Premier club The New Saints. He has previously played for Wigan Athletic, Hamilton Academical and Carlisle United.

== Career ==
=== Wigan Athletic ===
Redmond joined Wigan Athletic after being released by Everton in 2009. It was later explained that Redmond was released by Everton because he was too small. On 8 January 2011, he made his debut for Wigan, replacing James McArthur in the 80th minute of the FA Cup third round win at Hull City.

=== Loan Spells ===
He moved on loan to Scottish First Division club Hamilton Academical until the end of the season on 13 January 2012, making his debut on the same day in a 1–0 win against Partick Thistle. The next game, on 21 January 2012, Redmond scored his first goal for the club, in a 2–2 draw against Ayr United. Redmond would score four more goals against Livingston, Queen of the South, Ayr United (again) and Partick Thistle. Despite Hamilton being keen to extend his loan further, Redmond returned to his parent club.

On 8 February 2014, Redmond joined Carlisle United on a one-month loan. On 10 March 2014, he extended his loan spell with the Cumbrians for a further month until 5 April 2014. At the end of the season, Redmond was offered a new deal by Wigan, but he turned the offer down.

=== Hamilton Academical ===
Redmond signed a two-year contract with Hamilton Academical in June 2014. Upon making the move, Redmond revealed he turned down a big money contract from Wigan, in an effort to kick start his career.

He made his second debut for the club on 2 August 2014, as Hamilton beat Arbroath 2–1 in the Scottish League Cup. He scored his first league goal of the season against Partick Thistle in a 3–3 draw on 1 November 2014. Redmond said his first Hamilton goal since his return was "a long time coming" following his goal drought. Redmond scored his first goal of 2015, in a 5–0 win over rivals Motherwell. However, Redmond ended his first season at Hamilton Academical with 27 appearances and two goals in all competitions after suffering a knee injury that ruled him out for the entire season.

He was one of seven first-team players released by Hamilton at the end of the 2017–18 season.

=== The New Saints ===
After leaving Hamilton, Redmond signed for Welsh club The New Saints in May 2018.

== Career statistics ==
As of match played 23 April 2022

Appearances and goals by club, season and competition
Club	Season	League			National Cup		League Cup		Other		Total	
Club	Season	Division	Apps	Goals	Apps	Goals	Apps	Goals	Apps	Goals	Apps	Goals
Wigan Athletic	2010–11	Premier League	0	0	1	0	0	0	—		1	0
Wigan Athletic	2011–12	Premier League	0	0	0	0	0	0	—		0	0
Wigan Athletic	2012–13	Premier League	0	0	1	0	1	0	—		2	0
Wigan Athletic	2013–14	Championship	0	0	0	0	1	0	0	0	1	0
Wigan Athletic	Total		0	0	2	0	2	0	0	0	4	0
Hamilton Academical (loan)	2011–12	Scottish First Division	18	5	0	0	0	0	1 (Note: Appearance in the Scottish Challenge Cup)	0	19	5
Carlisle United (loan)	2013–14	League One	15	0	0	0	0	0	0	0	15	0
Hamilton Academical	2014–15	Scottish Premiership	23	2	1	0	3	0	—		27	2
Hamilton Academical	2015–16	Scottish Premiership	11	0	1	0	0	0	—		12	0
Hamilton Academical	2016–17	Scottish Premiership	27	1	3	1	2	0	2 (Note: Appearances in Scottish Premiership play-offs)	0	34	2
Hamilton Academical	2017–18	Scottish Premiership	25	2	1	0	5	0	—		31	2
Hamilton Academical	Total		86	5	6	1	10	0	2	0	104	6
The New Saints	2018–19	Welsh Premier League	24	2	4	2	3	2	7 (Note: Two appearances in UEFA Champions League, four appearances and one goal in UEFA Europa League, one appearance in Scottish Challenge Cup)	1	38	7
The New Saints	2019–20	Cymru Premier	22	1	2	2	0	0	7 (Note: Four appearances in UEFA Champions League, two appearances in UEFA Europa League, one appearance in Scottish Challenge Cup)	0	31	3
The New Saints	2020–21	Cymru Premier	23	0	0	0	0	0	2 (Note: Appearances in UEFA Europa League)	0	25	0
The New Saints	2021–22	Cymru Premier	29	2	3	0	0	0	3 (Note: Appearances in UEFA Europa Conference League)	1	35	3
The New Saints	Total		98	5	9	4	3	2	19	2	129	13
Career total			217	15	17	5	15	2	23	2	272	24

== Honours ==
Wigan Athletic

- FA Cup: 2012–13

The New Saints

- Cymru Premier: 2021–22

== Personal life ==
He is the son of former Manchester City, Oldham Athletic and Bury footballer Steve Redmond.
