= Greg Docherty =

Scottish footballer (born 1996)

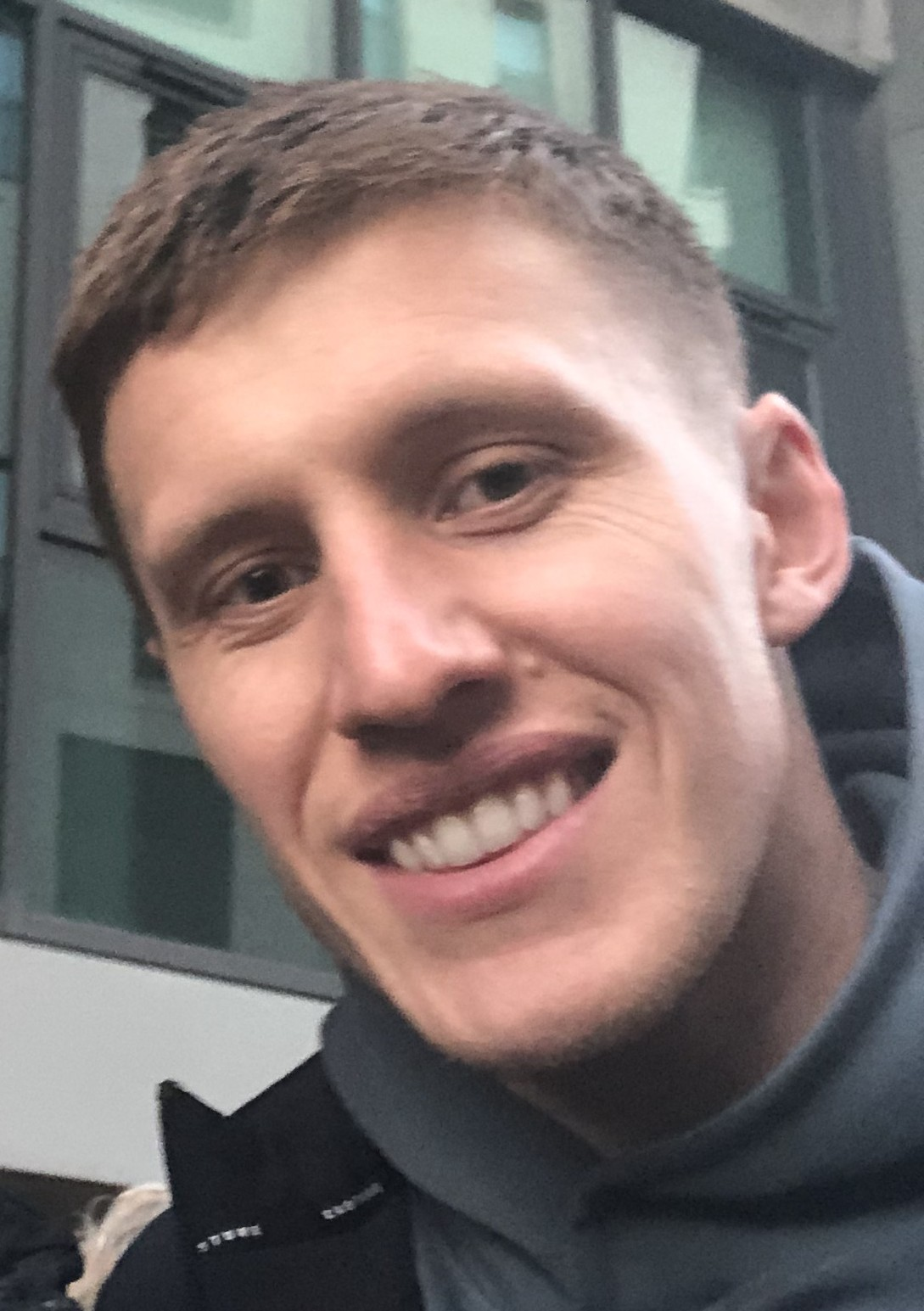
- Docherty in 2025

Personal information
- Full name: Greg Alexander Docherty
- Date of birth: 10 September 1996 (age 30)
- Place of birth: Milngavie, Scotland
- Height: 5 ft 10 in (1.77 m)
- Position: Midfielder

Team information
- Current team: Preston North End
- Number: 5

Youth career
- 2005–2012: Hamilton Academical

Senior career*
Years	Team	Apps	(Gls)
2012–2018	Hamilton Academical	94	(6)
2018–2020	Rangers	11	(0)
2018–2019	→ Shrewsbury Town (loan)	41	(7)
2020	→ Hibernian (loan)	6	(1)
2020–2024	Hull City	134	(6)
2024–2026	Charlton Athletic	79	(5)
2026–	Preston North End	2	(0)

International career
2012	Scotland U17	2	(0)
2016–2018	Scotland U21	4	(0)
- * Club domestic league appearances and goals as of 09:22, 22 November 2026 (UTC)

Greg Alexander Docherty (born 10 September 1996) is a Scottish professional footballer who plays as a midfielder for EFL Championship club Preston North End.

He has previously played for Hamilton Academical, Rangers, Shrewsbury Town, Hibernian, Hull City and Charlton Athletic.

== Early and personal life ==
Docherty is from Milngavie and attended Douglas Academy. He is of Irish heritage, through his grandparents.

== Club career ==
=== Hamilton Academical ===
Docherty joined Hamilton Academical at the age of 9 and progressed through all academy levels from U10s to the first team, and turned professional in October 2012. He made his senior debut on 7 December 2013. In April 2015, he signed a new contract with the club, until the summer of 2017. He scored his first senior career goal on 9 May 2015, an 85th-minute equaliser in a 1–1 home draw against Partick Thistle.

On 28 May 2017, he scored the only goal of the two-legged 2016–17 Scottish Premiership playoff tie against Dundee United, ensuring Hamilton would remain in the top division for the next season. He signed a new contract in August 2017, until 2020.

=== Rangers ===
On 25 January 2018, Docherty signed for his boyhood club Rangers on a four-and-a-half-year contract. On 8 August 2018, Docherty joined League One side Shrewsbury Town on a season-long loan deal. At the end of the 2018–19 season he was voted Shrewsbury's Player of the Year.

Upon his return to Rangers for the 2019–20 season he made 5 appearances, but none after August, and in December 2019 he was linked with a move away from the club in the January transfer window. Docherty was loaned to Hibernian on 31 January, with Florian Kamberi moving in the opposite direction. Docherty had an immediate impact with Hibs, scoring in a 2–1 win at Kilmarnock on 16 February. Following the formal conclusion of the truncated 2019–20 season, Docherty returned to his parent club in May 2020.

=== Hull City ===
On 20 August 2020, Docherty signed a three-year deal with Hull City for an undisclosed fee. He debuted for the Tigers in their EFL Cup first round tie away at Sunderland on 5 September 2020, with Hull winning via a penalty shoot-out after a 0–0 draw. He then made his league debut the following week, on the opening day of the 2020–21 season, a 2–0 away victory at Gillingham. Docherty scored his first goal for the Tigers in a 1–1 away draw with Oxford United on 5 December 2020. On 2 May 2023, it was announced that Docherty's goal in Hull's 3–1 win away at Blackpool had won the club's Goal of the Season award for the 2022–23 campaign.

Docherty was released by Hull at the end of the 2023–24 season, having made 142 appearances across all competitions during his four years with the club. His final appearance for the Tigers was their 3–0 win over Queens Park Rangers on 13 April 2024, a game in which Docherty came off the bench, replacing Jean Michaël Seri with five minutes to go.

=== Charlton Athletic ===
On 5 July 2024, Docherty joined Charlton Athletic on a three-year deal, with a club option of an additional year. He was subsequently named as club captain on 1 August 2024, after taking up the role unofficially during pre-season.

On 10 August 2024, Docherty made his competitive debut for Charlton in their 1–0 away win at Wigan Athletic on the opening day of the 2024–25 season.

His first goal for the Addicks came on 24 August 2024, scoring the opener in their 2–0 win over Bolton Wanderers at The Valley.

On 2 September 2026, Docherty left Charlton Athletic by mutual consent.

=== Preston North End ===
On 6 November 2026, Docherty joined Preston North End on a deal until the end of the 2026–27 season.

== International career ==
Docherty has represented Scotland at under-17 and under-21 youth international levels. After Docherty was left out of the under-21 squad in September 2017, it was suggested in media reports that he may instead play for the Republic of Ireland.

== Career statistics ==
As of match played 21 November 2026

Appearances and goals by club, season and competition
Club	Season	League			National cup (Note: Includes Scottish Cup, FA Cup)		League cup (Note: Includes Scottish League Cup, EFL Cup)		Other		Total	
Club	Season	Division	Apps	Goals	Apps	Goals	Apps	Goals	Apps	Goals	Apps	Goals
Hamilton Academical	2013–14	Scottish Championship	3	0	0	0	0	0	0	0	3	0
Hamilton Academical	2014–15	Scottish Premiership	7	1	0	0	0	0	—		7	1
Hamilton Academical	2015–16	Scottish Premiership	34	1	1	1	1	0	—		36	2
Hamilton Academical	2016–17	Scottish Premiership	29	1	1	0	5	0	2 (Note: Appearances in the Premiership play-offs.)	1	37	2
Hamilton Academical	2017–18	Scottish Premiership	21	3	0	0	4	0	—		25	3
Hamilton Academical	Total		94	6	2	1	10	0	2	1	108	8
Rangers	2017–18	Scottish Premiership	11	0	3	0	0	0	0	0	14	0
Rangers	2018–19	Scottish Premiership	0	0	0	0	0	0	0	0	0	0
Rangers	2019–20	Scottish Premiership	0	0	0	0	1	0	4 (Note: Appearances in the UEFA Europa League.)	0	5	0
Rangers	Total		11	0	3	0	1	0	4	0	19	0
Shrewsbury Town (loan)	2018–19	EFL League One	41	7	7	2	1	0	1 (Note: Appearance in the EFL Trophy.)	1	50	10
Rangers U20s	2019–20		—		—		—		1 (Note: Appearance in the Scottish Challenge Cup.)	0	1	0
Hibernian (loan)	2019–20	Scottish Premiership	6	1	2	2	0	0	—		8	3
Hull City	2020–21	EFL League One	44	5	0	0	2	0	2	1	48	6
Hull City	2021–22	EFL Championship	40	0	1	0	0	0	0	0	41	0
Hull City	2022–23	EFL Championship	35	1	1	0	0	0	0	0	36	1
Hull City	2023–24	EFL Championship	15	0	2	0	0	0	0	0	17	0
Hull City	Total		134	6	4	0	2	0	2	1	142	7
Charlton Athletic	2024–25	EFL League One	40	4	2	0	1	0	6 (Note: Three appearances in the EFL Trophy and three appearances in the League One play-offs)	0	49	4
Charlton Athletic	2025–26	EFL Championship	39	1	1	0	0	0	—		40	1
Charlton Athletic	2026–27	EFL Championship	0	0	0	0	1	0	—		1	0
Charlton Athletic	Total		79	5	3	0	2	0	6	0	90	5
Preston North End	2026–27	EFL Championship	2	0	0	0	—		—		2	0
Career total			367	25	21	5	16	0	16	3	420	33

== Honours ==
Hull City

- EFL League One: 2020–21

Charlton Athletic

- EFL League One play-offs: 2025

Individual

- Shrewsbury Town Player of the Year: 2018–19
- Hull City Goal of the Season: 2022–23
