= Mikey Devlin =

Scottish footballer (born 1993)

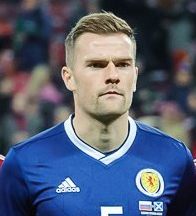
- Devlin lining up for Scotland in 2019

Personal information
- Full name: Michael James Devlin
- Date of birth: 3 October 1993 (age 33)
- Place of birth: Motherwell, Scotland
- Height: 6 ft 2 in (1.88 m)
- Position: Centre-back

Team information
- Current team: Ayr United
- Number: 5

Youth career
- Heart of Midlothian
- 2007–2009: Aberdeen
- 2009–2010: Celtic
- 2010–2011: Hamilton Academical

Senior career*
Years	Team	Apps	(Gls)
2011–2018	Hamilton Academical	125	(4)
2011	→ Stenhousemuir (loan)	10	(3)
2012	→ Stenhousemuir (loan)	13	(0)
2018–2022	Aberdeen	37	(1)
2022–2023	Fleetwood Town	2	(0)
2023	Hibernian	1	(0)
2023–2024	Livingston	29	(0)
2024–	Ayr United	10	(0)

International career^{‡}
2019	Scotland	3	(0)
- * Club domestic league appearances and goals as of 11 June 2025 ‡ National team caps and goals as of 18:46, 16 November 2019 (UTC)

Michael James Devlin (born 3 October 1993) is a Scottish professional footballer who plays as a centre-back for Ayr United. He has previously played for Hamilton Academical, Stenhousemuir, Aberdeen, Fleetwood Town, Hibernian and Livingston. He was selected for Scotland three times in 2019.

== Club career ==
=== Early career ===
Born in Motherwell, Devlin grew up in a street near to fellow footballer Mark Reynolds and attended the same school, where the older pupil was held up as an example to follow. As a teenager Devlin spent time in the youth systems of Heart of Midlothian, Aberdeen and Celtic, making the squad for a Glasgow Cup final with the latter in May 2010.

=== Hamilton Academical ===
He was picked up by Hamilton Academical, with assurances that hard work would result in a swift path to first team football. He made his senior debut for Hamilton in the Scottish Premier League on 15 January 2011, aged 16, in a 0–4 defeat away at Rangers; the performance of Devlin and other young players in that match, including Lee Kilday who also made his debut, was praised by manager Billy Reid.

He signed on loan for Stenhousemuir on 16 March 2011, and re-joined the Warriors on an emergency loan in February 2012, at the same time signing a two-year contract extension with Hamilton.

He scored his first goal for the Accies in the Scottish Cup in December 2012. In February 2014, he signed a contract extension until the end of the 2014–15 season.

In August 2016 he was appointed the club's new captain. In May 2017, he was involved in an altercation with a fan following a 1–0 home Lanarkshire derby defeat to relegation rivals Motherwell. In the last regular game of the 2016–17 season, Devlin suffered a serious knee injury, meaning he missed the club's two relegation play-off matches.

=== Aberdeen ===
Devlin moved to Aberdeen in January 2018 for an undisclosed fee, despite having not yet fully recovered from the knee injury suffered in May 2017. He eventually made his competitive debut for Aberdeen on 26 July 2018, in the first leg of a Europa League tie against Burnley at Pittodrie Stadium.

In August 2020 he was one of eight Aberdeen players who received a suspended three-match ban from the Scottish FA after they breached coronavirus-related restrictions by visiting a bar earlier in the month. He missed most of the 2020–21 season due to hamstring and ankle ligament injuries, and agreed new short-term contracts during 2021–22 with it being anticipated that he would eventually return to full fitness, but by April 2022 he had yet to be named in a matchday squad, and it was initially announced that he would leave Aberdeen at the end of the season but soon clarified that this would be immediate.

=== Fleetwood Town ===
Devlin trained with English club Fleetwood Town, managed by his former Aberdeen teammate Scott Brown, in June 2022. He signed a short-term contract with Fleetwood in August 2022. He departed the club in January following the expiration of his short-term deal.

=== Hibernian ===
After leaving Fleetwood before the end of the January transfer window, Devlin trained with Hibernian. He signed a short-term contract with the club on 13 February 2023.

=== Livingston ===
Devlin left Hibs at the end of the 2022–23 season and signed for Livingston. He was appointed club captain.

=== Ayr United ===
After leaving Livingston at the end of the 2023–24 season, he signed for Ayr United in July 2024.

== International career ==
Devlin was included in the Scotland squad for the first time in October 2018. He was recalled in May 2019, one of five uncapped players to feature. He made his international debut on 10 October 2019 in a Euro 2020 qualifier against Russia, playing the whole match as Scotland lost 0–4.

== Career statistics ==
As of 19 May 2024

Appearances and goals by club, season and competition
Club	Season	League			Scottish Cup		League Cup		Other		Total	
Club	Season	Division	Apps	Goals	Apps	Goals	Apps	Goals	Apps	Goals	Apps	Goals
Hamilton Academical	2010–11	Scottish Premier League	1	0	0	0	0	0	—		1	0
Hamilton Academical	2011–12	Scottish First Division	3	0	0	0	0	0	0	0	3	0
Hamilton Academical	2012–13	Scottish First Division	22	1	2	1	2	0	1 (Note: Appearance in Scottish Challenge Cup)	0	27	2
Hamilton Academical	2013–14	Scottish Championship	27	1	1	0	3	0	1	0	32	1
Hamilton Academical	2014–15	Scottish Premiership	28	0	0	0	4	0	—		32	0
Hamilton Academical	2015–16	Scottish Premiership	16	0	1	0	0	0	—		17	0
Hamilton Academical	2016–17	Scottish Premiership	28	2	4	0	4	0	0	0	36	2
Hamilton Academical	2017–18	Scottish Premiership	0	0	0	0	0	0	—		0	0
Hamilton Academical	Total		125	4	8	1	13	0	2	0	148	5
Stenhousemuir (loan)	2010–11	Scottish Second Division	10	3	0	0	0	0	0	0	10	3
Stenhousemuir (loan)	2011–12	Scottish Second Division	13	0	0	0	0	0	0	0	13	0
Stenhousemuir (loan)	Total		23	3	0	0	0	0	0	0	23	3
Aberdeen	2017–18	Scottish Premiership	0	0	0	0	0	0	0	0	0	0
Aberdeen	2018–19	Scottish Premiership	22	1	3	0	3	0	2 (Note: Appearance(s) in UEFA Europa League)	0	30	1
Aberdeen	2019–20	Scottish Premiership	14	0	3	0	1	0	1	0	19	0
Aberdeen	2020–21	Scottish Premiership	1	0	0	0	1	0	0	0	2	0
Aberdeen	2021–22	Scottish Premiership	0	0	0	0	0	0	0	0	0	0
Aberdeen	Total		37	1	6	0	5	0	3	0	51	1
Fleetwood Town	2022–23	EFL League One	2	0	0	0	0	0	2 (Note: Appearance(s) in the EFL Trophy.)	0	4	0
Hibernian	2022–23	Scottish Premiership	1	0	0	0	0	0	0	0	1	0
Livingston	2023–24	Scottish Premiership	29	0	1	0	5	0	0	0	35	0
Career total			217	8	15	1	23	0	7	0	262	9
