= Darren Jamieson =

Scottish footballer (born 1991)

Personal information
- Date of birth: 15 February 1991 (age 35)
- Place of birth: Livingston, Scotland
- Position: Goalkeeper

Team information
- Current team: Stenhousemuir
- Number: 1

Youth career
- 2008–2010: Livingston

Senior career*
Years	Team	Apps	(Gls)
2010–2016	Livingston	82	(0)
2016	→ Bo'ness United (loan)		
2016–2018	Hamilton Academical	2	(0)
2018–2020	Arbroath	42	(0)
2020–2023	Kelty Hearts	83	(0)
2023	→ Airdrieonians F.C.(loan)	4	(0)
2023–	Stenhousemuir	106	(0)
- * Club domestic league appearances and goals as of 4 May 2026

Darren Jamieson (born 15 February 1991) is a Scottish professional footballer, who plays as a goalkeeper for Scottish Championship club Stenhousemuir.

Jamieson has previously played for Livingston, Bo'ness United, Hamilton Academical, Arbroath and Kelty Hearts.

== Early life ==
Jamieson grew up in Polbeth, West Lothian and attended West Calder high school. He played in goal from a young age with Murieston United alongside pros like Danny Wilson and Rhys McCabe. Jamieson was then scouted by Rangers where he played for a few years before leaving for Livingston.

== Career ==
=== Livingston ===
A product of Livingston's youth system, Jamieson made his debut for the first-team on 27 April 2010, in a 2–0 home win over Albion Rovers in the Scottish Third Division. His next appearance came the following season on 7 May 2011, in a 3–1 away win against Alloa Athletic in the Scottish Second Division. Over the next couple of seasons, he was mainly utilised as reserve keeper in the first-team. He made three consecutive Scottish First Division appearances towards the end of season 2012–13, keeping two clean sheets in those three matches. Jamieson cemented his place as the number 1 goalkeeper at Livingston and in his first season as #1 saved five penalties. He was awarded both supporters young player and play of the year at the end of the season.

After Rangers goalkeeper Liam Kelly signed on loan with Livingston at the beginning of the 2016–17 season, Jamieson was sent on loan to Scottish Junior Football East Region Super League side Bo'ness United.

=== Hamilton Academical ===
Jamieson was released by Livingston on 31 August 2016. Livingston said that he had been released in order to join Premiership club Hamilton Academical, but he was not a Hamilton squad member by 9 September. He finally signed for Hamilton later that month, after a spell with Bo'ness.

Jamieson was one of seven first-team players released by Hamilton at the end of the 2017–18 season,

=== Arbroath ===
Jamieson then signed with League One club Arbroath in May 2018, going on to win promotion to the Championship with the club as 2018–19 League One champions.

=== Kelty Hearts ===
Jamieson signed for Lowland League side Kelty Hearts in July 2020. Kelty gained promotion to Scottish League Two after winning the 2020-21 Lowland League which was curtailed due to the COVID-19 pandemic. The following season, Jamieson featured in 35 of Kelty's 36 league matches as they won the 2021–22 Scottish League Two. Jamieson was again a key member of the squad for the 2022/23 campaign before departing at the end of the season upon expiry of his contract.

=== Airdrieonians (Loan) ===
On 13 May 2023, Jamieson joined Airdrieonians F.C. on an emergency loan deal and on the same day played the full match in a 1–0 victory against Falkirk in the 2022–23 Scottish Championship play-off semi-final 2nd leg. Jamieson was an unused substitute for Airdie's match against former club Hamilton in the 1st leg of the final.

=== Stenhousemuir ===
On 18 May 2023, Stenhousemuir F.C. announced that Jamieson would join the club following his contract expiry at Kelty Hearts. On 24 January 2024, Jamieson's contract was extended to keep him at the club until the summer of 2026. In his first season with The Warriors, Jamieson again won the Scottish League Two title for the 2023–24 season keeping 19 clean sheets in 34 games. He was included in the PFA Scotland League Two team of the year.

== Career statistics ==
As of match played 3rd August 2024

Appearances and goals by club, season and competition
Club	Season	League			Scottish Cup		League Cup		Other		Total	
Club	Season	Division	Apps	Goals	Apps	Goals	Apps	Goals	Apps	Goals	Apps	Goals
Livingston	2010–11	Scottish Third Division	1	0	0	0	0	0	0	0	1	0
Livingston	2010–11	Scottish Second Division	1	0	0	0	0	0	0	0	1	0
Livingston	2011–12	Scottish First Division	0	0	0	0	0	0	1 (Note: Appearances in the Scottish Challenge Cup)	0	1	0
Livingston	2012–13	Scottish First Division	3	0	0	0	0	0	0	0	3	0
Livingston	2013–14	Scottish Championship	31	0	0	0	2	0	1	0	34	0
Livingston	2014–15	Scottish Championship	36	0	1	0	3	0	5	0	45	0
Livingston	2015–16	Scottish Championship	10	0	1	0	3	0	2	0	16	0
Livingston	Livingston Total		82	0	2	0	8	0	9	0	101	0
Hamilton Academical	2016–17	Scottish Premiership	0	0	0	0	0	0	0	0	0	0
Hamilton Academical	2017–18	Scottish Premiership	2	0	0	0	0	0	—		2	0
Hamilton Academical	Hamilton Academical Total		2	0	0	0	0	0	0	0	2	0
Arbroath	2018–19	Scottish League One	35	0	1	0	3	0	0	0	39	0
Arbroath	2019–20	Scottish Championship	7	0	1	0	2	0	0	0	10	0
Arbroath	Arbroath Total		42	0	2	0	5	0	0	0	49	0
Kelty Hearts	2020–21	Lowland Football League	13	0	1	0	4	0	4 (Note: appearances in the Scottish League Two play-offs)	0	22	0
Kelty Hearts	2021–22	Scottish League Two	35	0	5	0	4	0	0	0	44	0
Kelty Hearts	2022–23	Scottish League One	35	0	0	0	4	0	4	0	43	0
	Kelty Hearts Total		83	0	6	0	12	0	8	0	109	0
Airdrieonians (loan)	2022–23	Scottish League One	0	0	0	0	0	0	1 (Note: appearance in Scottish Championship play-offs)	0	1	0
Stenhousemuir	2023–24	Scottish League Two	34	0	1	0	2	0	0	0	37	0
Stenhousemuir	2024-25	Scottish League One	1	0	0	0	3	0	0	0	4	0
	Stenhousemuir Total		35	0	1	0	5	0	0	0	41	0
Career total			244	0	11	0	30	0	18	0	303	0

== Honours ==
Livingston

- Scottish Challenge Cup: 2014–15

Arbroath

- Scottish League One: 2018–19

=== Kelty Hearts ===
- Scottish League Two: 2021–22

=== Stenhousemuir ===
- Scottish League Two: 2023–24
