= Rakish Bingham =

English footballer (born 1993)

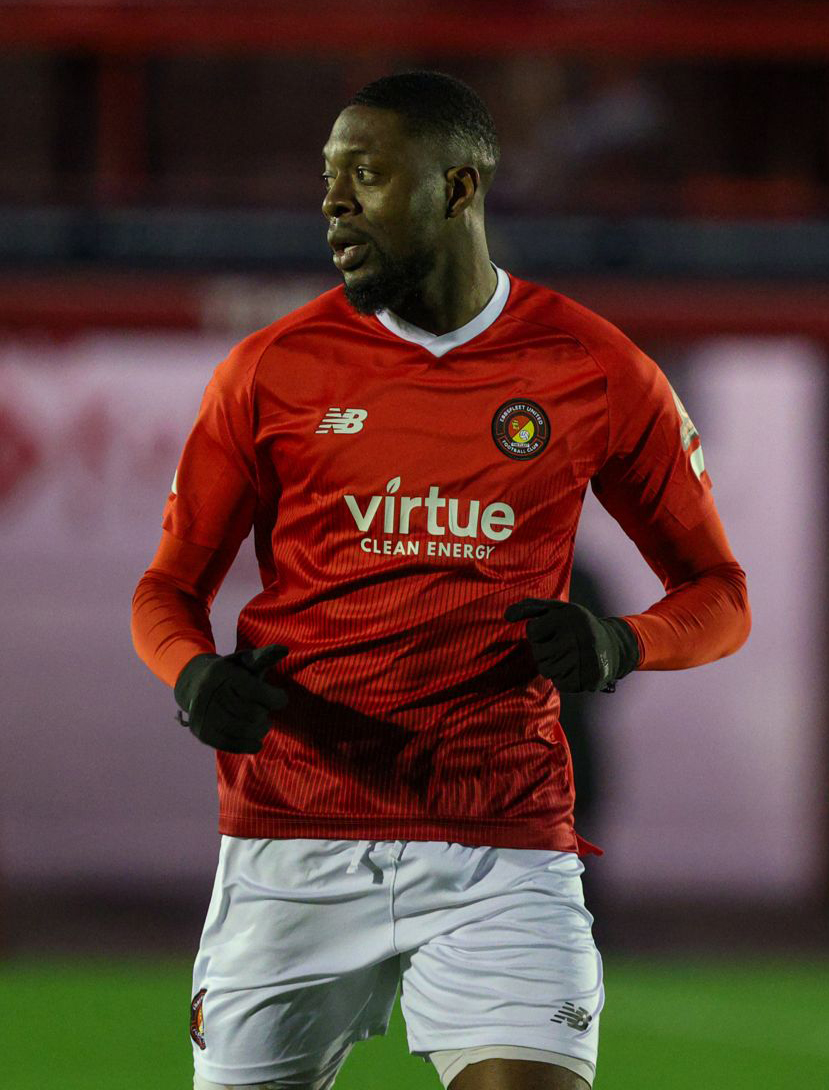
- Bingham playing for Ebbsfleet United in 2023

Personal information
- Full name: Rakish Philip Bingham
- Date of birth: 25 October 1993 (age 33)
- Place of birth: Newham, London, England
- Position: Forward

Team information
- Current team: Farnham Town
- Number: 14

Youth career
- Wigan Athletic

Senior career*
Years	Team	Apps	(Gls)
2012–2014	Wigan Athletic	0	(0)
2013	→ Falkirk (loan)	11	(0)
2014–2015	Mansfield Town	28	(6)
2015	→ Hartlepool United (loan)	5	(1)
2015–2016	Hartlepool United	31	(4)
2016–2019	Hamilton Academical	81	(11)
2019	Cheltenham Town	10	(0)
2019–2020	Doncaster Rovers	8	(1)
2020	Dundee United	5	(0)
2020–2025	Ebbsfleet United	132	(46)
2025–2026	Farnborough	43	(15)
2026–	Farnham Town	11	(4)
- * Club domestic league appearances and goals as of 18:02, 11 October 2026 (UTC)

Rakish Phillip Bingham (born 25 October 1993) is an English professional footballer who plays as a forward for National League South side Farnham Town.

He has also previously played for Wigan Athletic, Falkirk, Mansfield Town, Hartlepool United, Cheltenham Town, Doncaster Rovers Hamilton Academical and Dundee United.

== Career ==
=== Wigan Athletic ===
Bingham joined Wigan's under-18 side in 2010 and made his debut for the reserves in April 2011. He signed his first professional contract at the end of the 2011–12 season. He soon attracted interest from Premier League clubs, such as Manchester City, Newcastle United and Fulham.

On 27 August 2013, Bingham joined Scottish Championship side Falkirk on loan until the end of the year. He made 13 appearances, 11 in the league, but did not score during his time with the Bairns and returned to Wigan in January.

=== Mansfield Town ===
On 31 August 2014, Bingham joined Mansfield Town on a free transfer after leaving Wigan.

He scored on his Mansfield debut on 6 September 2014 in the 14th minute, a close range tap-in after the initial shot by Fergus Bell was saved, in the 1–2 away victory against Exeter City. He also scored twice against Carlisle United in a 3–2 home win for Mansfield weeks later on 20 September 2014.

Following his return from a loan period with Hartlepool United, Bingham scored his fourth goal of the season, in a 1–0 win over Luton Town, followed up with goals against Wimbledon and Cambridge United. In his first season, Bingham went on to make 28 league appearances, scoring six times for the club.

=== Hartlepool United ===
On 2 January 2015, Manager Adam Murray agreed a loan move for Bingham to join Hartlepool United until the end of the season. Murray explained his decision, saying the loan would let Bingham get regular playing time. He made his Hartlepool debut the next day, making his first start and playing 90 minutes, in a 1–0 against Wycombe Wanderers. Bingham then scored his first Hartlepool goal in the next game, a 2–0 win over Cheltenham Town On 2 February 2015, having scored once in five appearances, Bingham was recalled by Mansfield.

At the end of the season Mansfield announced that Bingham would be meeting with Murray to discuss his future at the club, then it was announced on 20 May 2015, that having been released by Mansfield, he would be returning to Hartlepool. Bingham explained his decision to re-join Hartlepool, saying that he wanted to continue working with Manager Ronnie Moore.

=== Hamilton Academical ===
Bingham signed for Hamilton Academical in August 2016. On 9 November 2016, he signed a contract extension, keeping him at Hamilton until May 2018. In November 2017, Bingham extended his contract by a further year keeping him at the club until May 2019. He left Hamilton in January 2019.

=== Cheltenham Town ===
After his release by Hamilton, Bingham signed a short-term contract with Cheltenham Town on 31 January 2019.

=== Doncaster Rovers ===
Having been without a club after leaving Cheltenham at the end of the 2018–19 season, Bingham signed for League One club Doncaster Rovers in November 2019. He left the club in January 2020, his contract having expired.

=== Dundee United ===
On 6 February, Bingham signed for Dundee United on a contract until the end of the 2019–20 season. In May 2020 and was announced that he would be one of eight players leaving the club in the summer following the expiry of his contract.

=== Ebbsfleet United ===
On 3 September 2020, Bingham signed for National League South side Ebbsfleet United. He departed the club at the end of the 2024–25 season.

=== Farnborough ===
On 20 June 2025, Bingham joined National League South side Farnborough on a two-year deal. On 16 May 2026, it was announced that Bingham would leave Farnborough, after the club failed in triggering his second year on his deal.

=== Farnham Town ===
On 17 May 2026, Bingham joined newly promoted National League South club Farnham Town on a one-year deal.

== Career statistics ==
As of 14 November 2026

Appearances and goals by club, season and competition
Club	Season	League			National Cup		League Cup		Other		Total	
Club	Season	Division	Apps	Goals	Apps	Goals	Apps	Goals	Apps	Goals	Apps	Goals
Wigan Athletic	2013–14	Championship	0	0	0	0	0	0	0	0	0	0
Falkirk (loan)	2013–14	Scottish Championship	11	0	0	0	1	0	1 (Note: Appearance in the Scottish Challenge Cup)	0	13	0
Mansfield Town	2014–15	League Two	28	6	4	1	0	0	0	0	32	7
Hartlepool United (loan)	2014–15	League Two	5	1	0	0	0	0	0	0	5	1
Hartlepool United	2015–16	League Two	31	4	4	0	2	0	1 (Note: Appearance in Football League Trophy)	0	38	4
Hamilton Academical	2016–17	Scottish Premiership	30	5	4	2	0	0	2 (Note: Appearances in the Premiership play-offs)	0	36	7
Hamilton Academical	2017–18	Scottish Premiership	32	5	1	0	5	1	—		38	6
Hamilton Academical	2018–19	Scottish Premiership	2	0	0	0	4	2	–		6	2
Hamilton Academical	Total		64	10	5	2	9	3	2	0	80	15
Cheltenham Town	2018–19	League Two	10	0	0	0	0	0	0	0	10	0
Doncaster Rovers	2019–20	League One	8	1	3	1	0	0	1 (Note: Appearance in EFL Trophy)	0	12	2
Dundee United	2019–20	Scottish Championship	5	0	0	0	0	0	0	0	5	0
Ebbsfleet United	2020–21	National League South	18	9	0	0	0	0	2	2	20	11
Ebbsfleet United	2021–22	National League South	30	12	2	1	0	0	3	2	35	15
Ebbsfleet United	2022–23	National League South	40	16	3	1	0	0	0	0	43	17
Ebbsfleet United	2023–24	National League	21	7	0	0	0	0	1	0	22	7
Ebbsfleet United	2024–25	National League	23	2	1	0	0	0	3	0	26	2
Ebbsfleet United	Total		132	46	6	2	0	0	9	4	146	52
Farnborough	2025–26	National League South	43	15	3	1	0	0	1	0	47	16
Farnham Town	2026–27	National League South	11	4	2	1	0	0	1	0	14	5
Career total			338	85	27	8	12	3	15	4	391	100
