= Steven Boyd =

Scottish footballer (born 1997)

Personal information
- Date of birth: 12 April 1997 (age 29)
- Place of birth: Scotland
- Position: Forward

Youth career
- 2005–2014: Celtic
- 2014–2015: Hamilton Academical

Senior career*
Years	Team	Apps	(Gls)
2015–2019	Hamilton Academical	45	(3)
2016–2017	→ Albion Rovers (loan)	15	(5)
2017–2018	→ Livingston (loan)	10	(0)
2019–2020	East Fife	9	(3)
2020–2021	Peterhead	26	(2)
2021–2022	Alloa Athletic	34	(7)
2022–2023	Inverness Caledonian Thistle	33	(1)
2023–2024	Greenock Morton	17	(2)
2024	East Kilbride	8	(2)
2025	Darvel		
2025	St Cadoc's		

International career
2012	Scotland U15	3	(0)
2012	Scotland U16	8	(1)
2014	Scotland U17	5	(0)
Medal record
Scotland
UEFA European U-17 Championship
Bronze medal – third place	2014 Malta	Team competition
- * Club domestic league appearances and goals as of 18:59, 2 January 2024 (UTC)

Steven Boyd (born 12 April 1997) is a Scottish professional footballer who plays as a forward.

Boyd has previously played for Hamilton Academical, Albion Rovers, Livingston, East Fife, Peterhead, Alloa Athletic and Inverness Caledonian Thistle.

== Club career ==
After being a member of the youth system at Celtic (where he moved through the age groups with Kieran Tierney and won multiple trophies including the Glasgow Cup) Boyd was released and signed for Hamilton Academical in 2014; he made his senior debut for the club in the Scottish Premiership on 23 May 2015, a few weeks after turning 18. The following season, he made only five league appearances but was in the match day squad for the majority of fixtures, and a regular in the SPFL Development League.

On 19 August 2016, Boyd signed for League One club Albion Rovers on loan until January 2017.

He was loaned to Championship club Livingston in December 2017, initially on an "emergency" basis. The loan was extended in January 2018 until the end of the season.

In January 2019 he signed a new contract with Hamilton, running until the end of the 2020–21 season. Boyd left the club in August 2019.

In September 2019 he signed for East Fife on a short-term deal until January 2020.

In January 2020 he moved to Peterhead.

Boyd signed for Alloa Athletic in June 2021.

The striker signed for Inverness Caledonian Thistle in 2022.

On 4 July 2023, Boyd joined fellow Scottish Championship side Greenock Morton on a two-year deal, lasting until summer 2025.

On 6 August 2024, Boyd joined Lowland League side East Kilbride. He departed the club by mutual consent in December 2024 and moved into the West of Scotland Football League with Darvel and then St Cadoc's.

== International career ==
Boyd represented Scotland at under-15, under-16 and under-17 youth international level.

== Career statistics ==
As of 22 December 2024

Appearances and goals by club, season and competition
Club	Season	League			Scottish Cup		League Cup		Other		Total	
Club	Season	Division	Apps	Goals	Apps	Goals	Apps	Goals	Apps	Goals	Apps	Goals
Hamilton Academical	2014–15	Scottish Premiership	1	0	0	0	0	0	0	0	1	0
Hamilton Academical	2015–16	Scottish Premiership	5	0	0	0	1	0	0	0	6	0
Hamilton Academical	2016–17	Scottish Premiership	3	0	0	0	3	0	0	0	6	0
Hamilton Academical	2017–18	Scottish Premiership	13	1	0	0	5	2	0	0	18	3
Hamilton Academical	2018–19	Scottish Premiership	23	2	1	0	2	0	0	0	26	2
Hamilton Academical	Total		45	3	1	0	11	2	0	0	57	5
Hamilton Academical U20	2016–17	Development League	–		–		–		2 (Note: Appearance(s) in Scottish Challenge Cup)	1	2	1
Albion Rovers (loan)	2016–17	Scottish League One	15	5	1	0	0	0	0	0	16	5
Livingston (loan)	2017–18	Scottish Championship	10	0	1	0	0	0	0	0	11	0
East Fife	2019–20	Scottish League One	9	3	1	0	0	0	0	0	10	3
Peterhead	2019–20	Scottish League One	6	1	0	0	0	0	0	0	6	1
Peterhead	2020–21	Scottish League One	20	1	0	0	4	2	0	0	24	3
Peterhead	Total		26	2	0	0	4	2	0	0	30	4
Alloa Athletic	2021–22	Scottish League One	34	7	2	0	4	0	1	1	41	8
Inverness Caledonian Thistle	2022–23	Scottish Championship	33	1	3	0	4	0	1	0	41	1
Greenock Morton	2023–24	Scottish Championship	17	2	1	0	4	1	2	0	24	3
East Kilbride	2024–25	Lowland League	8	2	2	1	0	0	2	1	12	4
Career total			197	25	12	1	27	5	8	3	244	34
