= Ryan Tierney =

Scottish footballer (born 1998)

Personal information
- Date of birth: 30 January 1998 (age 28)
- Height: 1.78 m (5 ft 10 in)
- Position: Striker

Youth career
- Airdrie United
- 2011–2016: Hamilton Academical

Senior career*
Years	Team	Apps	(Gls)
2016–2019	Hamilton Academical	2	(0)
2017–2018	→ Airdrieonians (loan)	5	(2)
2019	Edusport Academy		
2019–2020	Dumbarton	14	(1)
2020–2021	BSC Glasgow		
2021–2022	Stenhousemuir	11	(0)
2022–2023	Broomhill	23	(8)
2023–2024	Kirkintilloch Rob Roy		
- * Club domestic league appearances and goals as of 22 April 2023

Ryan Tierney (born 30 January 1998) is a Scottish professional footballer who plays as a striker.

== Career ==
Tierney began his career with Airdrie, joining Hamilton Academical in 2011, turning professional in July 2014.

On 18 August 2017, Tierney and Hamilton teammate Jordan McGregor signed for Airdrieonians on a development loan until January 2018. He returned to Accies on 3 January 2018. After leaving Hamilton he spent time with Edusport Academy before joining Scottish League One side Dumbarton in the summer of 2019 scoring the winner on his debut, in a 1-0 success against Annan Athletic. After 20 appearances and two goals for the club, he left in the summer of 2020 after a single season.

BSC Glasgow announced the signing of Tierney on 31 July 2020. He then moved to Stenhousemuir in 2021.

== Career statistics ==
As of 21:53, 15 February 2020 (UTC)

Appearances and goals by club, season and competition
Club	Season	League			National Cup		League Cup		Other		Total	
Club	Season	Division	Apps	Goals	Apps	Goals	Apps	Goals	Apps	Goals	Apps	Goals
Hamilton Academical	2016–17	Scottish Premiership	2	0	0	0	0	0	0	0	2	0
Hamilton Academical	2017–18	Scottish Premiership	0	0	0	0	1	0	0	0	1	0
Hamilton Academical	Total		2	0	0	0	1	0	0	0	3	0
Airdrieonians (loan)	2017–18	Scottish League One	5	2	0	0	0	0	0	0	5	2
Dumbarton	2019–20	Scottish League One	14	1	2	0	3	1	1	0	20	2
Career total			21	3	2	0	4	1	1	0	28	4
