= Georgios Sarris =

Greek footballer

Personal information
- Full name: Georgios Sarris
- Date of birth: 9 August 1989 (age 37)
- Place of birth: Heraklion, Crete, Greece
- Height: 1.88 m (6 ft 2 in)
- Position: Centre-back

Team information
- Current team: Almyros Gazi

Youth career
- Ergotelis

Senior career*
Years	Team	Apps	(Gls)
2008–2014	Ergotelis	92	(1)
2014–2015	AEK Athens	9	(0)
2015–2016	Kayseri Erciyesspor	26	(2)
2016–2018	Hamilton Academical	51	(1)
2019	Petrolul	7	(0)
2019–2020	Flamurtari	5	(0)
2020–2022	Ergotelis	27	(1)
2022–2023	Irodotos	5	(0)
2023	Chania	2	(0)
2023–2024	Ermis Zoniana		
2024–	Almyros Gazi		
- * Club domestic league appearances and goals as of 16 June 2023

Georgios Sarris (Greek: Γεώργιος Σαρρής; born 8 September 1989) is a Greek professional footballer who plays as a centre-back for Almyros Gazi.

== Career ==
=== Ergotelis ===
Sarris began his football career at the infrastructure segments of his local club Ergotelis. He signed his first professional contract with the club in 2009. At the age of 19, Sarris made two league appearances in his first season and one appearance in the 2009–10 season. In the 2010–11 season he began gaining substantially more playing time, making eight appearances in the league and one in the cup, while the next season saw him making another 21 appearances. At the end of the 2011−12 season, Ergotelis were relegated to the Football League. As many of the club veterans refused to follow the club in the lower division, Sarris became a permanent starter in 34 games, cementing the club's defense which only conceded 25 goals in 40 matches total, thus significantly contributing to the club's 2nd-place finish and instant promotion to the Super League. His steady performances had already made Sarris a target for many major clubs in Greece, though he chose to stay at Ergotelis for one more season in the Super League, during which the club achieved its best ever finish to date in the competition. During the season, Sarris scored the first goal in his career in a 0−2 away win vs. Aris on 26 March 2014.

=== AEK Athens ===
On July 1, 2014, Sarris signed with traditional Greek giants AEK, who had been willingly relegated to the third division two years prior to clear past debts, and were about to play in the Football League. He made a small contribution to the club division title win with 9 league appearances, adding another three in the Cup.

=== Kayseri Erciyesspor ===
On 31 August 2015 Sarris signed a one-year contract with Kayseri Erciyesspor for an undisclosed fee. He made 26 appearances for the "Blue Dragons", also scoring two goals, yet the club was relegated from the top-flight at the end of the season.

=== Hamilton Academical ===
On 23 July 2016, Sarris signed a two-year contract with Scottish Premiership club Hamilton Academical on a Bosman free deal. He made his debut for the club in a 1–1 away draw against Rangers. He scored his first goal for the club on 16 December 2017, in a 3–2 win at home to Ross County. On 28 December 2017, manager Martin Canning has confirmed that Georgios Sarris has played his last game for Hamilton Academical. The Accies board were reportedly unhappy with the Greek defender's conduct immediately after 1–0 loss to Partick Thistle at Firhill. Sarris reacted angrily to a collision with Thistle striker Miles Storey and was booked at the final whistle by referee Bobby Madden. Hamilton initially decided to release from his contract, but reversed this decision two weeks later.

He was one of seven first-team players released by Hamilton at the end of the 2017–18 season.

=== Petrolul Ploiești ===
On 12 January 2019, Petrolul Ploiești announced the signing of the 29-year-old Greek defender until the summer of 2020.

== Career statistics ==
As of match played 26 September 2021

Appearances and goals by club, season and competition
Club	Season	League			National Cup		League Cup		Other		Total	
Club	Season	Division	Apps	Goals	Apps	Goals	Apps	Goals	Apps	Goals	Apps	Goals
Ergotelis	2008–09	Super League Greece	2	0	0	0	—		—		2	0
Ergotelis	2009–10	Super League Greece	1	0	0	0	—		—		1	0
Ergotelis	2010–11	Super League Greece	8	0	1	0	—		—		9	0
Ergotelis	2011–12	Super League Greece	21	0	0	0	—		—		21	0
Ergotelis	2012–13	Football League	34	0	1	0	—		—		35	0
Ergotelis	2013–14	[Super League Greece	26	1	2	0	—		—		28	1
Ergotelis	Total		92	1	4	0	—		—		96	1
AEK Athens	2014–15	Football League	7	0	3	0	—		2 (Note: Appearance in the Football League play-offs)	0	12	0
AEK Athens	Total		7	0	3	0	—		2	0	12	0
Kayseri Erciyesspor	2015–16	TFF First League	26	2	0	0	—		—		26	2
Kayseri Erciyesspor	Total		26	2	0	0	—		—		26	2
Hamilton Academical	2016–17	Scottish Premiership	30	0	1	0	2	0	1 (Note: Appearance in the Premiership play-offs)	0	34	0
Hamilton Academical	2017–18	Scottish Premiership	21	1	0	0	3	0	—		24	1
Hamilton Academical	Total		51	1	1	0	5	0	1	0	58	1
Petrolul Ploiești	2018–19	Liga II	7	0	0	0	—		—		7	0
Petrolul Ploiești	Total		7	0	0	0	—		—		7	0
Flamurtari	2019–20	Kategoria Superiore	5	0	1	0	—		—		6	0
Flamurtari	Total		5	0	1	0	—		—		6	0
Ergotelis	2020–21	Super League 2	2	0	—		—		—		2	0
Ergotelis	2021–22	Super League 2	0	0	1	1	—		—		1	1
Ergotelis	Total		2	0	1	1	—		—		3	1
Career total			190	4	10	1	5	0	3	0	208	5

== Honours ==
AEK Athens

- Football League: 2014–15
