= Jack Breslin (footballer) =

Scottish footballer

Personal information
- Date of birth: 6 April 1997 (age 29)
- Position: Defender

Team information
- Current team: Petershill

Senior career*
Years	Team	Apps	(Gls)
2014–2016	Celtic	0	(0)
2015	→ Annan Athletic (loan)	5	(0)
2016	→ Annan Athletic (loan)	6	(0)
2016–2017	Hamilton Academical	0	(0)
2017–2018	Clyde	10	(0)
2018–2019	Cambuslang Rangers		
2019–2020	Caledonian Braves		
2020–	Petershill		

International career^{‡}
2012	Scotland U15	3	(0)
2012	Scotland U16	6	(0)
2013–2014	Scotland U17	11	(0)
2015–2016	Scotland U19	9	(0)
Medal record
Scotland
UEFA European U-17 Championship
Bronze medal – third place	2014 Malta	Team competition
- * Club domestic league appearances and goals as of 14:10, 29 July 2020 (UTC) ‡ National team caps and goals as of 11:26, 17 July 2016 (UTC)

Jack Breslin (born 6 April 1997) is a Scottish professional footballer who plays as a defender for Petershill.

== Club career ==
Breslin began his career with Celtic, and has two loan spells with Annan Athletic, the first from January 2015, and the second from February 2016. He signed for Hamilton Academical in July 2016. He was released by Hamilton at the end of the 2016–17 season, subsequently signing for Scottish League Two club Clyde on 7 June 2017. Breslin left Clyde in May 2018, following the end of his contract. Breslin signed with Cambuslang Rangers in June 2018 before moving to Edusport in February 2019. West of Scotland team Petershill announced the signing of Breslin on 24 July 2020.

== International career ==
Breslin has represented Scotland at various youth international levels – under-15, under-16, under-17, and under-19.

== Career statistics ==
As of 4 May 2018

Appearances and goals by club, season and competition
Club	Season	League			Scottish Cup		League Cup		Other		Total	
Club	Season	Division	Apps	Goals	Apps	Goals	Apps	Goals	Apps	Goals	Apps	Goals
Celtic	2014–15	Scottish Premiership	0	0	0	0	0	0	0	0	0	0
Celtic	2015–16	Scottish Premiership	0	0	0	0	0	0	0	0	0	0
Celtic	Total		0	0	0	0	0	0	0	0	0	0
Annan Athletic (loan)	2014–15	Scottish League Two	5	0	0	0	0	0	0	0	5	0
Annan Athletic (loan)	2015–16	Scottish League Two	6	0	1	0	0	0	0	0	7	0
Annan Athletic (loan)	Total		11	0	1	0	0	0	0	0	12	0
Hamilton Academical	2016–17	Scottish Premiership	0	0	0	0	1	0	0	0	1	0
Clyde	2017–18	Scottish League Two	10	0	2	0	3	1	1 (Note: Appearance in the Scottish Challenge Cup)	0	16	1
Career total			21	0	3	0	4	1	1	0	29	1
