= Alexandre D'Acol =

Brazilian footballer (born 1986)

Personal information
- Full name: Alexandre D'Acol Joaquim
- Date of birth: 18 July 1986 (age 40)
- Place of birth: São Paulo, Brazil
- Height: 1.86 m (6 ft 1 in)
- Position: Forward

Youth career
- –2004: Comercial
- 2001–2002: → Vitória (loan)

Senior career*
Years	Team	Apps	(Gls)
2004–2007	Olympiacos	10	(0)
2006–2007	→ Kerkyra (loan)	22	(4)
2007–2009	Panionios	2	(0)
2010–2011	Kallithea	26	(13)
2011–2012	Thrasyvoulos	22	(11)
2012–2013	Kallithea	39	(25)
2013–2015	AEK Athens	37	(25)
2015–2017	Hamilton Academical	44	(9)
2017	Lamia	3	(0)
2018	Trikala	7	(0)
Total		212	(87)
- * Club domestic league appearances and goals as of 7 March 2018

Alexandre D'Acol (born 18 July 1986) is a Brazilian footballer who plays as a forward.

== Career ==
Born in São Paulo, D'Acol began playing professional football for local side Comercial Futebol Clube (São Paulo). He had a loan spell with Esporte Clube Vitória, and would join Super League Greece side Olympiacos in August 2004.

=== Career in Greece ===
Olympiacos send D'Acol on a one-year loan to Kerkyra in 2006 and again in 2007. While in Kallithea D'Acol made his way to be one of the top goal-scorers in both the Greek Football League (Second Professional League) and the Greek Cup. In 2013, AEK Athens signed D'Acol for two years. In his first appearance with AEK's jersey (friendly match, 31 August 2013), he scored a goal against his previous team, Kallithea.

=== Hamilton Academical ===
On 26 August 2015, D'Acol joined Scottish Premiership side Hamilton Academical on a one-year deal. On 27 June 2016, he signed a new contract, keeping him at the club for a further year.

=== Return to Greece ===
On 11 September 2017, just before the end of the transfer window, Lamia announced the signing of the Brazilian striker. On 19 December 2017, after some poor performances, the club announced that D'Acol's contract had been terminated. On 1 January 2018, he signed a contract with Football League club Trikala.

== Honours ==
Individual

- Greek Cup top scorer: 2012–13
