= Craig Watson (footballer, born 1995) =

Scottish footballer

Personal information
- Date of birth: 13 February 1995 (age 31)
- Place of birth: Fraserburgh, Scotland
- Positions: Defender; midfielder

Team information
- Current team: Arbroath
- Number: 16

Youth career
- Park Villa
- 2005–2012: Hamilton Academical

Senior career*
Years	Team	Apps	(Gls)
2011–2017	Hamilton Academical	11	(0)
2015–2016	→ Arbroath (loan)	20	(2)
2017–2021	East Fife	83	(6)
2021–2025	Airdrieonians	113	(10)
2025–	Arbroath	28	(0)
- * Club domestic league appearances and goals as of 4 May 2026

Craig Watson (born 13 February 1995) is a Scottish professional footballer who plays as a defender or midfielder for Scottish Championship club Arbroath.

== Career ==
Watson moved from Park Villa in Govan to Hamilton Academical as a youth player. He signed a professional contract with the club in 2012, and made his senior debut on 28 April 2012, in a 5–1 defeat against Ross County in the Scottish First Division, just a year after suffering a potentially career-threatening injury. In April 2013, Watson signed a two-year extension to his contract. In April 2015 he signed a new contract with the club, until the summer of 2017.

In September 2015, Watson moved on loan to Arbroath until January 2016. This loan spell was later extended until the end of the season.

Watson left Hamilton at the end of the 2016–17 season. He then signed for East Fife. Watson made his debut for the club in the League Cup against Peterhead on 15 July 2017. He signed a new contract with the club in June 2018 and departed in May 2021 for Airdrieonians.

== Career statistics ==
As of match played 06 November 2021

Appearances and goals by club, season and competition
Club	Season	League			Scottish Cup		League Cup		Other		Total	
Club	Season	Division	Apps	Goals	Apps	Goals	Apps	Goals	Apps	Goals	Apps	Goals
Hamilton Academical	2011–12	Scottish First Division	1	0	0	0	0	0	0	0	1	0
Hamilton Academical	2012–13	Scottish First Division	0	0	0	0	0	0	0	0	0	0
Hamilton Academical	2013–14	Scottish Championship	5	0	0	0	0	0	0	0	5	0
Hamilton Academical	2014–15	Scottish Premiership	2	0	0	0	1	0	0	0	3	0
Hamilton Academical	2015–16	Scottish Premiership	1	0	0	0	0	0	0	0	1	0
Hamilton Academical	2016–17	Scottish Premiership	2	0	2	0	0	0	0	0	4	0
Hamilton Academical	Total		11	0	2	0	1	0	0	0	14	0
Arbroath (loan)	2015–16	Scottish League Two	20	2	3	0	0	0	0	0	23	2
East Fife	2017–18	Scottish League One	22	1	1	0	4	0	1 (Note: Appearance(s) in the Scottish Challenge Cup)	0	28	1
East Fife	2018–19	Scottish League One	23	4	3	1	4	0	4	0	34	5
East Fife	2019–20	Scottish League One	18	1	1	1	3	0	1	0	23	2
East Fife	2020–21	Scottish League One	20	0	2	1	3	0	0	0	25	1
East Fife	Total		83	6	7	3	14	0	6	0	110	9
Airdrieonians	2021–22	Scottish League One	11	0	0	0	4	0	1	0	16	0
Career total			124	7	12	3	19	0	7	0	163	11
