= 2020–21 Hamilton Academical F.C. season =

Hamilton Academical
2020–21 season
- Chairman: Allan Maitland
- Manager: Brian Rice
- Stadium: New Douglas Park
- Scottish Premiership: 12th (relegated)
- Scottish Cup: Third round
- League Cup: Group stage
- Top goalscorer: League: Ross Callachan (10); All: Ross Callachan (10)
Home colours	Away colours

The 2020–21 season was the seventh consecutive season in the top flight of Scottish football played by Hamilton Academical, following their promotion to the division at the end of the 2013–14 season. Hamilton also competed in the League Cup and the Scottish Cup.

== Results and fixtures ==
Win Draw Loss Postponed

=== Pre-season ===
25 July 2020	Motherwell	2–2	Hamilton Academical	Motherwell
14:00 BST	Donnelly 41'; Lamie 70'	Report	McMann 45'; Ogkmpoe 50'	Stadium: Fir Park

=== Scottish Premiership ===
2 August 2020 1	Celtic	5–1	Hamilton Academical	Glasgow
16:30 BST	Édouard 20', 49', 53'; Frimpong 34'; Klimala 90'	Report	Martin 34'	Stadium: Celtic Park; Attendance: 0 (Note: Match played behind closed doors); Referee: Willie Collum

8 August 2020 2	Hamilton Academical	0–1	Ross County	Hamilton
15:00 BST		Report	Mckay 76'; Vigurs 90+1'	Stadium: New Douglas Park; Attendance: 0 Referee: Bobby Madden

15 August 2020 3	Hamilton Academical	0–1	St Mirren	Hamilton
15:00 BST		Report	Obika 19'	Stadium: New Douglas Park; Attendance: 0 Referee: Steven Kirkland

22 August 2020 4	Motherwell	0–1	Hamilton Academical	Motherwell
15:00 BST		Report	Odoffin 86'	Stadium: Fir Park; Attendance: 0 Referee: Alan Muir

15 August 2020 5	Hamilton Academical	0–2	Rangers	Hamilton
15:00 BST	McMann (yellow card) 11' (red card) 76'	Report	Hagi 15'; Tavernier 20'	Stadium: New Douglas Park; Attendance: 0 Referee: Willie Collum

12 September 2020 6	Livingston	1–2	Hamilton Academical	Livingston
15:00 BST	Want 1' (o.g.)	Report	Templeton 57'; Munro 85'	Stadium: Almondvale Stadium; Attendance: 0 Referee: Don Robertson

19 September 2020 7	Kilmarnock	2–1	Hamilton Academical	Kilmarnock
15:00 BST	Kiltie 10'; Brophy (red card) 23'; Kabamba 57'	Report	Odoffin 18'	Stadium: Rugby Park; Attendance: 0 Referee: Nick Walsh

26 September 2020 8	Hamilton Academical	1–1	Dundee United	Hamilton
15:00 BST	Odoffin 75'	Report	Shankland 4'	Stadium: New Douglas Park; Attendance: 0 Referee: Alan Muir

2 October 2020 9	Hibernian	3–2	Hamilton Academical	Edinburgh
19:45 BST	Nisbet 19', 35'; Hanlon 63'	Report	Callachan 75' (pen.); Porteous 84' (o.g.)	Stadium: Easter Road; Attendance: 0 Referee: Bobby Madden

17 October 2020 10	Hamilton Academical	3–5	St Johnstone	Hamilton
15:00 BST	Hughes 40', 79'; Ogkmpoe 44'	Report	May 1', 33'; Wotherspoon 14'; Conway 69', 82'	Stadium: New Douglas Park; Attendance: 0 Referee: Alan Muir

20 October 2020 11	Aberdeen	4–2	Hamilton Academical	Aberdeen
19:45 BST	Hoban 14'; Ferguson 21'; Edmondson 24', 31'; McLennan (yellow card) 86'	Report	Moyo 32'; Callachan 68' (pen.); Odoffin (yellow card) 90+1'	Stadium: Pittodrie Stadium; Attendance: 0 Referee: Nick Walsh

8 November 2020 12	Rangers	8–0	Hamilton Academical	Govan
15:00 BST	Arfield 16'; Roofe 18', 54'; Aribo 19', 36'; Barker 62'; Tavernier 65' (pen.), 69'	Report		Stadium: Ibrox Stadium; Attendance: 0 Referee: Steven McLean

21 November 2020 13	Dundee United	2–1	Hamilton Academical	Dundee
15:00 BST	Clark 76', 80'	Report	Callachan 56'	Stadium: Tannadice Park; Attendance: 0 Referee: Craig Napier

25 November 2020 14	Hamilton Academical	1–1	Aberdeen	Hamilton
19:45 BST	Ogkmpoe 49'	Report	Hedges 19'	Stadium: New Douglas Park; Attendance: 0 Referee: Gavin Duncan

5 December 2020 15	Hamilton Academical	1–0	Kilmarnock	Hamilton
15:00 BST	Callachan 73' (pen.)	Report	Dikamona (red card) 29'	Stadium: New Douglas Park; Attendance: 0 Referee: Willie Collum

12 December 2020 16	Hamilton Academical	0–4	Hibernian	Hamilton
15:00 BST		Report	Boyle 10' (pen.); Doidge 39'; McGinn 65'; Nisbet 68'	Stadium: New Douglas Park; Attendance: 0 Referee: Kevin Clancy

19 December 2020 17	Ross County	0–2	Hamilton Academical	Dingwall
15:00 BST		Report	Callachan 22'; Martin 62'	Stadium: Victoria Park; Attendance: 0

23 December 2020 18	Hamilton Academical	0–2	Livingston	Hamilton
18:00 BST		Report	Guthrie 51'; Mullin 90+1'	Stadium: New Douglas Park; Attendance: 0 Referee: Gavin Duncan

26 December 2020 19	Hamilton Academical	0–3	Celtic	Hamilton
15:00 BST		Report	Edouard 49' (pen.); Griffiths 54'; Turnbull 74'	Stadium: New Douglas Park; Attendance: 0 Referee: Don Robertson

30 December 2020 20	St Johnstone	0–0	Hamilton Academical	Hamilton
15:00 BST		Report		Stadium: McDiarmid Park; Attendance: 0 Referee: David Munro

2 January 2021 21	Hamilton Academical	3–0	Motherwell	Hamilton
15:00 BST	Hodson 10'; Callachan 49'; Smith 65'	Report		Stadium: New Douglas Park; Attendance: 0 Referee: Colin Steven

9 January 2021 22	Kilmarnock	2–0	Hamilton Academical	Kilmarnock
15:00 BST	Kiltie 36', 63'	Report		Stadium: Rugby Park; Attendance: 0 Referee: Grant Irvine

16 January 2021 23	Hamilton Academical	0–0	Dundee United	Hamilton
15:00 BST		Report		Stadium: New Douglas Park; Attendance: 0

27 January 2021 24	Celtic	2–0	Hamilton Academical	Glasgow
19:45 BST	Griffiths 12'; Édouard 48'	Report		Stadium: Celtic Park; Attendance: 0 Referee: Colin Steven

3 February 2021 25	Hamilton Academical	1–2	Ross County	Hamilton
15:00 BST	Kelly 16' (o.g.)	Report	White 81'; McKay 85'	Stadium: New Douglas Park; Attendance: 0

7 February 2021 26	Hamilton Academical	1–1	Rangers	Hamilton
12:00 BST	Callachan 90+4'	Report	Easton 80' (o.g.)	Stadium: New Douglas Park; Attendance: 0 Referee: Bobby Madden

13 February 2021 27	Motherwell	1–4	Hamilton Academical	Motherwell
12:00 BST	O'Donnell (red card) 18'; O'Hara 68' (pen.)	Report	Anderson 7'; Callachan 19' (pen.); Ogkmpoe 31'; Moyo 64'	Stadium: Fir Park; Attendance: 0 Referee: Bobby Madden

17 February 2021 28	St Mirren	1–1	Hamilton Academical	Paisley
15:00 BST	Durmuş 53'	Report	Anderson 68'	Stadium: St Mirren Park; Attendance: 0 Referee: Steven McLean

20 February 2021 29	Hibernian	2–0	Hamilton Academical	Edinburgh
15:00 BST	Boyle 13'; Doig 70'	Report	Hamilton (red card) 12'	Stadium: Easter Road; Attendance: 0 Referee: Craig Napier

3 March 2021 30	Hamilton Academical	1–1	St Johnstone	Hamilton
18:00 BST	Callachan 36'	Report	Melamed 87'	Stadium: New Douglas Park; Attendance: 0 Referee: Grant Irvine

6 March 2021 31	Aberdeen	0–0	Hamilton Academical	Aberdeen
15:00 BST		Report		Stadium: Pittodrie Stadium; Attendance: 0 Referee: Bobby Madden

13 March 2021 32	Livingston	2–1	Hamilton Academical	Livingston
15:00 BST	Emmanuel-Thomas 16'; Pittman 36'	Report	Smith 30'	Stadium: Almondvale; Attendance: 0 Referee: Kevin Clancy

20 March 2021 33	Hamilton Academical	1–1	St Mirren	Hamilton
15:00 BST	Munro 89'	Report	McGrath 33' (pen.)	Stadium: New Douglas Park; Attendance: 0 Referee: Don Robertson

10 April 2021 34	Hamilton Academical	0–1	Dundee United	Hamilton
15:00 BST		Report	McNulty 6'	Stadium: New Douglas Park; Attendance: 0 Referee: Bobby Madden

21 April 2021 35	Hamilton Academical	0–1	Motherwell	Hamilton
19:00 BST	Hughes (red card) 33'	Report	O'Hara 37'	Stadium: New Douglas Park; Attendance: 0 Referee: Kevin Clancy

1 May 2021 36	St Mirren	1–2	Hamilton Academical	Paisley
15:00 BST	McGrath 71'	Report	Callachan 28'; Moyo 57'	Stadium: St Mirren Park; Attendance: 0 Referee: John Beaton

12 May 2021 37	Ross County	2–1	Hamilton Academical	Dingwall
19:45 BST	Spittal 28'; Lakin 70'	Report	McMann 26'	Stadium: Victoria Park; Attendance: 0 Referee: William Collum

16 May 2021 38	Hamilton Academical	0–2	Kilmarnock	Hamilton
12:00 BST		Report	Pinnock 9', 44'	Stadium: New Douglas Park; Attendance: 0 Referee: Kevin Clancy

=== Scottish League Cup ===
==== Group stage ====
6 October 2020 Group Stage	Annan Athletic	3–1	Hamilton Academical	Annan
19:45 BST	Swinglehurst 31'; Fulton 38'; Purdue 43'	Report	McMann 51'	Stadium: Galabank; Attendance: 0 (Note: behind closed doors); Referee: Craig Napier

10 October 2020 Group Stage	Hamilton Academical	2–1	Ayr United	Hamilton
15:00 BST	Ogkmpoe 19'; Trafford 36'	Report	Moffat 68'	Stadium: New Douglas Park; Attendance: 0 (Note: behind closed doors); Referee: Colin Steven

11 November 2020 Group Stage	Stranraer	2–1	Hamilton Academical	Stranraer
19:45 BST	Orr 34'; Duffy 81'	Report	Odoffin 71'	Stadium: Stair Park; Attendance: 0 (Note: behind closed doors); Referee: Willie Collum

14 November 2020 Group Stage	Hamilton Academical	3–0	Albion Rovers	New Douglas Park
15:00 BST				Attendance: 0 (Note: behind closed doors)

=== Scottish Cup ===
3 April 2021 Third round	Hamilton Academical	0–3	St Mirren	New Douglas Park
15:00		Report	McGrath 4', 79' (pen.); Dennis 74'	Attendance: 0 Referee: Euan Anderson

== Squad statistics ==
=== Appearances ===
As of 16 May 2021

No.	Pos	Nat	Player	Total		Premiership		League Cup		Scottish Cup	
No.	Pos	Nat	Player	Apps	Goals	Apps	Goals	Apps	Goals	Apps	Goals
2	DF	(England) ENG	Hakeem Odoffin	41	4	37	3	3	1	1	0
3	DF	(Scotland) SCO	Scott McMann	40	2	36	1	3	1	1	0
4	DF	(Scotland) SCO	Ben Stirling	22	0	16+4	0	2	0	0	0
5	DF	(Scotland) SCO	Brian Easton	26	0	24	0	1	0	1	0
6	DF	(Scotland) SCO	Jamie Hamilton	28	0	21+6	0	0	0	0+1	0
7	FW	(Scotland) SCO	Bruce Anderson	14	2	13	2	0	0	1	0
8	MF	(Scotland) SCO	Scott Martin	27	1	21+3	1	1+1	0	1	0
9	FW	(Greece) GRE	Marios Ogkmpoe	22	4	15+5	3	2	1	0	0
10	MF	(Scotland) SCO	David Templeton	10	1	7+1	1	2	0	0	0
11	MF	(Scotland) SCO	Lewis Smith	10	0	4+5	0	1	0	0	0
12	DF	(Scotland) SCO	Shaun Want	11	0	11	0	0	0	0	0
14	MF	(Canada) CAN	Charlie Trafford	11	1	3+7	0	1	1	0	0
15	MF	(Scotland) SCO	Ronan Hughes	18	2	7+9	2	0+1	0	1	0
16	DF	(England) ENG	Aaron Martin	26	0	24	0	1	0	1	0
17	DF	(New Zealand) NZL	George Stanger	5	0	1+4	0	0	0	0	0
18	MF	(Scotland) SCO	Reegan Mimnaugh	19	0	8+9	0	1+1	0	0	0
19	FW	(Scotland) SCO	Andy Winter	23	0	10+12	0	1	0	0	0
20	FW	(Zimbabwe) ZIM	David Moyo	36	3	23+10	3	0+2	0	1	0
21	MF	(Scotland) SCO	Kyle Munro	20	2	9+7	2	1+2	0	0+1	0
22	GK	(Scotland) SCO	Kyle Gourlay	11	0	9+1	0	1	0	0	0
23	GK	(Scotland) SCO	Ryan Fulton	31	0	28	0	2	0	1	0
24	MF	(England) ENG	Nathan Thomas	11	0	3+7	0	1	0	0	0
25	FW	(Scotland) SCO	Sean Slaven	0	0	0	0	0	0	0	0
26	MF	(Scotland) SCO	Marley Redfern	1	0	0+1	0	0	0	0	0
27	DF	(Northern Ireland) NIR	Lee Hodson	36	1	33	1	2	0	1	0
31	GK	(Scotland) SCO	Jamie Smith	1	0	1	0	0	0	0	0
32	FW	(Scotland) SCO	Callum Smith	26	2	8+15	2	3	0	0	0
33	MF	(Scotland) SCO	Daryl Meikle	0	0	0	0	0	0	0	0
34	MF	(Scotland) SCO	Ross Callachan	37	10	32+1	10	3	0	1	0
41	GK	(Republic of Ireland) IRL	Ryan Scully	0	0	0	0	0	0	0	0
Players who left the club during the 2018–19 season
4	DF	(Scotland) SCO	Ciaran McKenna	1	0	0+1	0	0	0	0	0
7	MF	(England) ENG	Will Collar	6	0	5+1	0	0	0	0	0
16	DF	(Norway) NOR	Markus Fjørtoft	2	0	1+1	0	0	0	0	0
36	FW	(Belgium) BEL	Tunde Owolabi	9	0	1+6	0	1+1	0	0	0
37	FW	(Netherlands) NED	Justin Johnson	7	0	1+4	0	0+2	0	0	0

== Team statistics ==
=== League table ===
Pos	Team	Pld	W	D	L	GF	GA	GD	Pts	Qualification or relegation (Note: Teams play each other three times (33 matches), before the league is split into two groups (the top six and the bottom six).)
8	Motherwell	38	12	9	17	39	55	−16	45	
9	Dundee United	38	10	14	14	32	50	−18	44	
10	Ross County	38	11	6	21	35	66	−31	39	
11	Kilmarnock (R)	38	10	6	22	43	54	−11	36	Qualification for the Premiership play-off final
12	Hamilton Academical (R)	38	7	9	22	34	67	−33	30	Relegation to Championship

Rules for classification: 1) Points; 2) Goal difference; 3) Goals scored; 4) Head-to-head points; 5) Head-to-Head goal difference; 6) Play-off (only if deciding champion, UEFA competitions qualification, second stage group allocation or relegation).
(R) Relegated

=== Results by round ===
Round	1	2	3	4	5	6	7	8	9	10	11	12	13	14	15	16	17	18	19	20	21	22	23	24	25	26	27	28	29	30	31	32	33	34	35	36	37	38
Ground	A	H	H	A	H	A	A	H	A	H	A	A	A	H	H	H	A	H	H	A	H	A	H	A	H	H	A	A	A	H	A	A	H	H	H	A	A	H
Result	L	L	L	W	L	W	L	D	L	L	L	L	L	D	W	L	W	L	L	D	W	L	D	L	L	D	W	D	L	D	D	L	D	L	L	W	L	L
Position	12	12	12	9	11	9	10	10	11	12	12	12	12	12	10	11	11	11	11	11	10	11	11	12	12	12	11	11	11	12	11	11	12	12	12	12	12	12

Source: BBC
A = Away; H = Home; W = Win; D = Draw; L = Loss

=== League Cup table ===
Pos	Team	Pld	W	PW	PL	L	GF	GA	GD	Pts	Qualification	AYR	ANN	STR	HAM	ALB
1	Ayr United	4	2	1	0	1	8	5	+3	8	Qualification for the Second round	—	1–0	p1–1	—	—
2	Annan Athletic	4	2	0	1	1	9	4	+5	7		—	—	1–1p	3–1	—
3	Stranraer	4	1	1	2	0	6	5	+1	7		—	—	—	2–1	2–2p
4	Hamilton Academical	4	2	0	0	2	7	6	+1	6		2–1	—	—	—	3–0
5	Albion Rovers	4	0	1	0	3	5	15	−10	2		2–5	1–5	—	—	—

Rules for classification: 1) points, 2) goal difference, 3) goals scored, 4) away goals scored, 5) matches won, 6) away matches won, 7) drawing of lots.

== Transfers ==
=== Players in ===
Player	From	Fee
(Scotland) Ross Callachan	(Scotland) St Johnstone	Free
(Canada) Charlie Trafford	(Scotland) Inverness CT	Free
(Scotland) Callum Smith	(Scotland) Dunfermline Athletic	Free
(Belgium) Tunde Owolabi	(England) FC United of Manchester	Undisclosed
(England) Hakeem Odoffin	(Scotland) Livingston	Undisclosed
(Netherlands) Justin Johnson	(Cyprus) Othellos Athienou	Free
(Scotland) Ben Stirling	(Scotland) Hibernian	Free
(Republic of Ireland) Ryan Scully	(Scotland) Dunfermline Athletic	Free
(England) Aaron Martin	(England) Exeter City	Free
(England) Nathan Thomas	(England) Sheffield United	Free

=== Players out ===
Player	To	Fee
(England) Aaron McGowan	(Scotland) Kilmarnock	Free
(England) George Oakley	(Bulgaria) Pirin Blagoevgrad	Free
(Cyprus) Alex Gogić	(Scotland) Hibernian	Free
(England) Mickel Miller	(England) Rotherham United	Free
(England) Steve Davies	(England) Runcorn Town	Free
(England) Johnny Hunt	(England) Kettering Town	Free
(Scotland) Charlie Reilly	(Scotland) Partick Thistle	Free
(Wales) Owain Fôn Williams	(Scotland) Dunfermline Athletic	Free
(Scotland) Blair Alston	(Scotland) Falkirk	Free
(Scotland) Ciaran McKenna	(Scotland) Partick Thistle	Free
(Norway) Markus Fjørtoft	(Scotland) Greenock Morton	Free
(England) Will Collar	(England) Stockport County	Free
(Netherlands) Justin Johnson	(Scotland) Greenock Morton	Free
(Belgium) Tunde Owolabi	(Republic of Ireland) Finn Harps	Free

=== Loans in ===
Player	From	Fee
(Northern Ireland) Lee Hodson	(England) Gillingham	Loan
(Scotland) Bruce Anderson	(Scotland) Aberdeen	Loan

=== Loans out ===
Player	To	Fee

== Notes ==
1. A: Hamilton were awarded a technical 3−0 win over Albion Rovers who were unable to field a team after two players had reported symptoms of COVID-19.
2. B: Hamilton were awarded a technical 3−0 win over St Mirren who were unable to field a team after two players had reported symptoms of COVID-19.
