= 2021–22 Hamilton Academical F.C. season =

Hamilton Academical
2021–22 season
- Chairman: Allan Maitland
- Manager: Brian Rice (until 11 August); Stuart Taylor (from 20 August)
- Stadium: New Douglas Park
- Scottish Championship: 6th
- Scottish Cup: Third round
- League Cup: Group stage
- Challenge Cup: Quarter–final
- Top goalscorer: League: Andy Ryan (9); All: Andy Ryan (11)
- Highest home attendance: 2,595 vs. Kilmarnock, Championship, 21 August 2021
- Lowest home attendance: 363 vs. Aberdeen B, Challenge Cup, 6 October 2021
- Average home league attendance: 1,262
Home colours	Away colours

The 2021–22 season was Hamilton Academical's first season back in the second tier of Scottish football, following their relegation from the Scottish Premiership at the end of the 2020–21 season. Hamilton also competed in the League Cup, Challenge Cup and the Scottish Cup.

== Summary ==
=== Management ===
Hamilton began the season under the management of Brian Rice who had been at the club since January 2019. Rice would resign from his position after only the second game of the league season following a 1–0 loss to Greenock Morton.

Former Hamilton player and assistant manager Stuart Taylor returned to the club after being appointed as their new head coach on 20 August.

== Results and fixtures ==
Win Draw Loss Postponed

=== Scottish Championship ===
31 July 2021 1	Raith Rovers	4–4	Hamilton Academical	Kirkcaldy
15:00 BST	Vaughan 13' (pen.), 65'; Zanatta 25'; Connolly 52'	Report	MacDonald 68', 83'; Ryan 78'; Want 90+2'	Stadium: Stark's Park; Attendance: 1,569; Referee: Nick Walsh

7 August 2021 2	Hamilton Academical	0–1	Greenock Morton	Hamilton
15:00 BST		Report	Ugwu 40'; Blues (red card) 87'	Stadium: New Douglas Park; Attendance: 935; Referee: Greg Aitken

21 August 2021 3	Hamilton Academical	0–2	Kilmarnock	Hamilton
15:00 BST		Report	Robinson 60', 70'	Stadium: New Douglas Park; Attendance: 2,595; Referee: John Beaton

28 August 2021 4	Queen of the South	1–2	Hamilton Academical	Dumfries
15:00 BST	Paton 54'	Report	Ryan 46'; Smith 74'	Stadium: Palmerston Park; Attendance: 1,232; Referee: Gavin Duncan

11 September 2021 5	Arbroath	4–0	Hamilton Academical	Arbroath
15:00 BST	Stewart 45+2'; McKenna 57'; Nouble 80'; Low 85'	Report	Hamilton (red card) 72'	Stadium: Gayfield Park; Attendance: 1,234; Referee: Greg Aitken

18 September 2021 6	Hamilton Academical	0–2	Ayr United	Hamilton
15:00 BST		Report	Bradley 64'; Adeloye 78'	Stadium: New Douglas Park; Attendance: 1,365; Referee: Andrew Dallas

25 September 2021 7	Dunfermline Athletic	0–0	Hamilton Academical	Dunfermline
15:00 BST		Report		Stadium: East End Park; Attendance: 3,150; Referee: Scott Lambie

2 October 2021 8	Hamilton Academical	2–1	Inverness CT	Hamilton
15:00 BST	Smith 10'; Ryan 26'; Mimnaugh (red card) 30'	Report	Gardyne 90+2'	Stadium: New Douglas Park; Attendance: 1,088; Referee: Euan Anderson

15 October 2021 9	Hamilton Academical	1–6	Partick Thistle	Hamilton
19:45 BST	Moyo 89'	Report	Rudden 7', 58'; Graham 53', 74'; Tiffoney 61'; Murray 72'	Stadium: New Douglas Park; Attendance: 1,775; Referee: Euan Anderson

23 October 2021 10	Kilmarnock	2–1	Hamilton Academical	Kilmarnock
15:00 BST	Shaw 5'; Armstrong 74'	Report	Hamilton 8'	Stadium: Rugby Park; Attendance: 3,969; Referee: Alan Newlands

26 October 2021 11	Hamilton Academical	1–0	Queen of the South	Hamilton
19:45 BST	Ryan 76'	Report		Stadium: New Douglas Park; Attendance: 942; Referee: Gavin Duncan

30 October 2021 12	Greenock Morton	1–1	Hamilton Academical	Greenock
15:00 BST	Mimnaugh 90+7' (o.g.)	Report	Smith 10'	Stadium: Cappielow; Attendance: 1,529; Referee: Steven Reid

6 November 2021 13	Hamilton Academical	1–1	Arbroath	Hamilton
15:00 BST	Ryan 16' (pen.)	Report	O'Brien 90+1'	Stadium: New Douglas Park; Attendance: 1,107; Referee: Scott Lambie

13 November 2021 14	Hamilton Academical	0–3	Raith Rovers	Hamilton
15:00 BST		Report	Matheson 6' (o.g.); Ross 34', 45'	Stadium: New Douglas Park; Attendance: 1,303; Referee: Peter Stuart

20 November 2021 15	Partick Thistle	1–0	Hamilton Academical	Glasgow
15:00 BST	Mayo 57'	Report		Stadium: Firhill Stadium; Attendance: 2,886; Referee: Euan Anderson

4 December 2021 16	Hamilton Academical	1–0	Dunfermline Athletic	Hamilton
15:00 BST	Moyo 61' (pen.)	Report	Dorrans (red card) 61'	Stadium: New Douglas Park; Attendance: 1,175; Referee: David Munro

10 December 2021 17	Ayr United	1–1	Hamilton Academical	Ayr
19:45 BST	Adeloye 48'	Report	Smith 40'	Stadium: Somerset Park; Attendance: 951; Referee: Craig Napier

18 December 2021 18	Inverness CT	1–2	Hamilton Academical	Inverness
15:00 BST	Harper 65'	Report	Moyo 79'; Winter 82'	Stadium: Caledonian Stadium; Attendance: 1,862; Referee: Chris Graham

26 December 2021 19	Hamilton Academical	2–3	Kilmarnock	Hamilton
15:00 BST	Hughes 3'; Mullin 84'	Report	Hendry 8' (pen.); Stokes 35'; Murray 54'; Hemming (red card) 78'	Stadium: New Douglas Park; Attendance: 420; Referee: John Beaton

2 January 2022 20	Queen of the South	0–3	Hamilton Academical	Dumfries
15:00 BST	Gibson (red card) 21'	Report	Moyo 20'; Hamilton 70'; Mullin 77'	Stadium: Palmerston Park; Attendance: 437; Referee: Barry Cook

8 January 2022 21	Hamilton Academical	2–2	Partick Thistle	Hamilton
15:00 BST	Ryan 55' (pen.); Popescu 67'	Report	Tiffoney 45+1'; Rudden 64'	Stadium: New Douglas Park; Attendance: 500; Referee: William Collum

15 January 2022 22	Dunfermline Athletic	1–0	Hamilton Academical	Dunfermline
15:00 BST	Dow 32'	Report		Stadium: East End Park; Attendance: 556; Referee: Robert Malcolm

29 January 2022 23	Hamilton Academical	1–1	Ayr United	Hamilton
15:00 BST	Kennedy 7'	Report	Ashford 66'	Stadium: New Douglas Park; Attendance: 1,230; Referee: John Beaton

5 February 2022 24	Raith Rovers	0–0	Hamilton Academical	Kirkcaldy
15:00 BST		Report		Stadium: Stark's Park; Attendance: 1,196; Referee: Bobby Madden

9 February 2022 25	Arbroath	2–2	Hamilton Academical	Arbroath
19:45 BST	Low 38' (pen.); McKenna 90+1' (pen.)	Report	O'Reilly 25'; Ryan 45'	Stadium: Gayfield Park; Attendance: 1,213; Referee: Gavin Duncan

19 February 2022 26	Hamilton Academical	1–0	Greenock Morton	Hamilton
15:00 BST	Spence 47'	Report		Stadium: New Douglas Park; Attendance: 1,360; Referee: Andrew Dallas

25 February 2022 27	Hamilton Academical	1–1	Inverness CT	Hamilton
19:45 BST	Mullin 13'	Report	Pearson 30'	Stadium: New Douglas Park; Attendance: 1,187; Referee: Alan Muir

5 March 2022 28	Kilmarnock	2–0	Hamilton Academical	Kilmarnock
15:00 BST	Murray 44'; Alston 55'	Report		Stadium: Rugby Park; Attendance: 4,083; Referee: David Munro

12 March 2022 29	Hamilton Academical	2–2	Dunfermline Athletic	Hamilton
15:00 BST	Moyo 25', 77'	Report	Donaldson 6'; Lawless 52' (pen.)	Stadium: New Douglas Park; Attendance: 1,369; Referee: Greg Aitken

19 March 2022 30	Partick Thistle	0–4	Hamilton Academical	Glasgow
15:00 BST		Report	Ryan 19', 50'; Moyo 45+1'; Winter 63'	Stadium: Firhill Stadium; Attendance: 2,567; Referee: Andrew Dallas

26 March 2022 31	Hamilton Academical	1–0	Queen of the South	Hamilton
15:00 BST	Winter 65'	Report	Liddle (red card) 40'	Stadium: New Douglas Park; Attendance: 1,214; Referee: Graham Grainger

1 April 2022 32	Ayr United	1–1	Hamilton Academical	Glasgow
19:45 BST	McInroy 90+4'	Report	Winter 6'	Stadium: Firhill Stadium; Attendance: 1,618; Referee: Chris Graham

9 April 2022 33	Hamilton Academical	0–1	Arbroath	Hamilton
15:00 BST		Report	Hamilton 59'	Stadium: New Douglas Park; Attendance: 911; Referee: Scott Lambie

16 April 2022 34	Greenock Morton	0–1	Hamilton Academical	Greenock
15:00 BST		Report	Moyo 6'	Stadium: Firhill Stadium; Attendance: 1,808; Referee: William Collum

23 April 2022 35	Hamilton Academical	0–2	Raith Rovers	Hamilton
15:00 BST		Report	Williamson 11', 58'	Stadium: New Douglas Park; Attendance: 1,478; Referee: Steven McLean

29 April 2022 36	Inverness CT	4–0	Hamilton Academical	Inverness
19:45 BST	Walsh 4', 22'; Sutherland 15'; Hardy 28'	Report		Stadium: Caledonian Stadium; Attendance: 2,131; Referee: Graham Grainger

=== Scottish League Cup ===
==== Group stage ====
9 July 2021 1	Edinburgh City	0–1	Hamilton Academical	Edinburgh
19:45 BST		Report	Smith 25'	Stadium: Ainslie Park; Attendance: 300; Referee: Craig Napier

17 July 2021 2	Falkirk	1–2	Hamilton Academical	Falkirk
15:00 BST	Nesbitt 46'	Report	Hughes 79' (pen.); Hamilton 87'	Stadium: Falkirk Stadium; Attendance: 723; Referee: Steven McLean

20 July 2021 3	Hamilton Academical	0–1	Ayr United	Hamilton
18:00 BST		Report	Salkeld 27'	Stadium: New Douglas Park; Attendance: 801; Referee: Bobby Madden

24 July 2021 4	Hamilton Academical	2–2 (6–5 p)	Albion Rovers	Hamilton
15:00 BST	Hughes 55' (pen.); Smith 79'	Report	Wilson 37'; Reilly 39'	Stadium: New Douglas Park; Attendance: 488; Referee: Lloyd Wilson

=== Scottish Challenge Cup ===
31 August 2021 Second round	Hamilton Academical	3–2	Heart of Midlothian B	Hamilton
19:45 BST	Virtanen 5'; Spence 71'; Ryan 78'	Report	Kirk 61'; Denholm 63'	Stadium: New Douglas Park; Attendance: 409; Referee: Chris Graham

6 October 2021 Third round	Hamilton Academical	2–0	Aberdeen B	Hamilton
19:45 BST	McGowan 37'; Munro 66'	Report		Stadium: New Douglas Park; Attendance: 363; Referee: Steven Kirkland

30 November 2021 Quarter-final	Hamilton Academical	2–3	Kilmarnock	Hamilton
19:45 BST	Moyo 68'; Ryan 86' (pen.)	Report	Armstrong 53'; Sanders 89', 90+4'	Stadium: New Douglas Park; Attendance: 829; Referee: Steven Kirkland

=== Scottish Cup ===
27 November 2021 Third round	Auchinleck Talbot	1–0	Hamilton Academical	Auchinleck
15:00 BST	Wilson 60'	Report		Stadium: Beechwood Park; Attendance: 1,778; Referee: Matthew MacDermid

== Squad statistics ==
=== Appearances ===
As of 29 April 2022

No.	Pos	Nat	Player	Total		Championship		League Cup		Challenge Cup		Scottish Cup	
No.	Pos	Nat	Player	Apps	Goals	Apps	Goals	Apps	Goals	Apps	Goals	Apps	Goals
1	GK	(Scotland) SCO	Ryan Fulton	21	0	20	0	0	0	1	0	0	0
2	MF	(Finland) FIN	Miko Virtanen	19	1	8+7	0	0	0	3	1	0+1	0
3	DF	(Romania) ROU	Mihai Popescu	32	1	30+1	1	0	0	0	0	1	0
4	DF	(Scotland) SCO	Ben Stirling	12	0	1+3	0	4	0	2+1	0	1	0
5	DF	(Scotland) SCO	Brian Easton	27	0	19+3	0	3	0	2	0	0	0
6	DF	(Scotland) SCO	Jamie Hamilton	33	3	26+1	2	3+1	1	2	0	0	0
7	DF	(Scotland) SCO	Kieran MacDonald	37	2	31+1	2	3	0	2	0	0	0
8	MF	(Scotland) SCO	Scott Martin	15	0	5+8	0	0	0	0+1	0	1	0
9	FW	(Scotland) SCO	Andy Ryan	37	11	24+8	9	0+1	0	1+2	2	1	0
11	MF	(Scotland) SCO	Lewis Smith	36	4	22+6	4	4	0	2+1	0	0+1	0
12	DF	(Scotland) SCO	Shaun Want	11	1	6	1	2	0	2	0	1	0
14	MF	(Scotland) SCO	Lewis Spence	23	2	18+2	1	2	0	0+1	1	0	0
15	MF	(Scotland) SCO	Ronan Hughes	20	3	10+4	1	4	2	1	0	1	0
16	MF	(Scotland) SCO	Josh Mullin	34	3	28+4	3	0	0	2	0	0	0
17	MF	(Scotland) SCO	Kai Kennedy	7	1	6+1	1	0	0	0	0	0	0
18	MF	(Scotland) SCO	Reegan Mimnaugh	35	0	24+3	0	4	0	3	0	1	0
19	FW	(Scotland) SCO	Andy Winter	15	4	7+8	4	0	0	0	0	0	0
20	FW	(Zimbabwe) ZIM	David Moyo	37	9	26+3	8	2+2	0	3	1	0+1	0
21	MF	(Scotland) SCO	Kyle Munro	13	1	3+3	0	2+2	0	2	1	1	0
23	GK	(England) ENG	Joe Hilton	23	0	16	0	4	0	2	0	1	0
24	MF	(Togo) TOG	Steve Lawson	11	0	10+1	0	0	0	0	0	0	0
25	FW	(Scotland) SCO	Sean Slaven	0	0	0	0	0	0	0	0	0	0
26	MF	(Scotland) SCO	Marley Redfern	28	0	16+6	0	1+3	0	0+1	0	1	0
27	DF	(Scotland) SCO	Matthew Shiels	10	0	5+3	0	0	0	0+1	0	1	0
29	MF	(Scotland) SCO	Jack Garrad	0	0	0	0	0	0	0	0	0	0
31	GK	(Scotland) SCO	Jamie Smith	0	0	0	0	0	0	0	0	0	0
33	MF	(England) ENG	Ellis Brown	10	0	3+7	0	0	0	0	0	0	0
34	DF	(Republic of Ireland) IRL	Daniel O'Reilly	17	1	17	1	0	0	0	0	0	0
35	MF	(Scotland) SCO	Adam McGowan	8	1	0+5	0	0+2	1	1	0	0	0
36	MF	(Scotland) SCO	Miles Gafney	0	0	0	0	0	0	0	0	0	0
37	DF	(Scotland) SCO	Chris McGinn	2	0	0	0	1	0	1	0	0	0
38	DF	(Scotland) SCO	Cian Newbury	0	0	0	0	0	0	0	0	0	0
39	DF	(Scotland) SCO	Sam Nicolson	1	0	0+1	0	0	0	0	0	0	0
Players who left the club during the 2021–22 season
2	DF	(England) ENG	Hakeem Odoffin	1	0	0	0	1	0	0	0	0	0
3	DF	(Scotland) SCO	Scott McMann	4	0	3+1	0	0	0	0	0	0	0
10	MF	(Scotland) SCO	David Templeton	3	0	1+2	0	0	0	0	0	0	0
17	DF	(New Zealand) NZL	George Stanger	3	0	2	0	0	0	1	0	0	0
22	DF	(England) ENG	Luke Matheson	9	2	8+1	0	0	0+2	0	0	0	0
32	MF	(Scotland) SCO	Callum Smith	5	2	1	0	3+1	2	0	0	0	0
33	MF	(Scotland) SCO	Daryl Meikle	1	0	0	0	1	0	0	0	0	0

== Team statistics ==
=== League table ===
Pos	Team	Pld	W	D	L	GF	GA	GD	Pts	Promotion, qualification or relegation
4	Partick Thistle	36	14	10	12	46	40	+6	52	Qualification for the Premiership play-off quarter-final
5	Raith Rovers	36	12	14	10	44	44	0	50	
6	Hamilton Academical	36	10	12	14	38	53	−15	42	
7	Greenock Morton	36	9	13	14	36	47	−11	40	
8	Ayr United	36	9	12	15	39	52	−13	39	

Rules for classification: 1) Points; 2) Goal difference; 3) Goals scored; 4) Head-to-to head points; 5) Head-to-head goal difference; 6) Play-off (only for deciding promotion, play-off participation and relegation).

=== League Cup table ===
Pos	Team	Pld	W	PW	PL	L	GF	GA	GD	Pts	Qualification	AYR	HAM	ALB	EDI	FAL
1	Ayr United	4	3	0	1	0	7	0	+7	10	Qualification for the second round	—	—	—	3–0	3–0 (Note: Ayr United were awarded a technical 3−0 win over Falkirk, who were unable to raise a team after a COVID-19 outbreak among players and staff.)
2	Hamilton Academical	4	2	1	0	1	5	4	+1	8		0–1	—	p2–2	—	—
3	Albion Rovers	4	0	2	1	1	4	8	−4	5		p0–0	—	—	p1–1	—
4	Edinburgh City	4	1	0	1	2	4	5	−1	4		—	0–1	—	—	3–0 (Note: Edinburgh City were awarded a technical 3−0 win over Falkirk, who were unable to raise a team after a COVID-19 outbreak among players and staff.)
5	Falkirk	4	1	0	0	3	6	9	−3	3		—	1–2	5–1	—	—

Rules for classification: 1) goal difference, 2) goals scored, 3) away goals scored, 4) matches won, 5) away matches won, 6) drawing of lots.

== Transfers ==
=== Players in ===
Player	From	Fee
(Scotland) Matthew Shiels	(Scotland) Rangers	Free
(Scotland) Kieran MacDonald	(Scotland) Raith Rovers	Free
(Scotland) Andy Ryan	(Scotland) Stirling Albion	Free
(Scotland) Lewis Spence	(England) Scunthorpe United	Free
(Finland) Miko Virtanen	(Scotland) Aberdeen	Free
(Republic of Ireland) Daniel O'Reilly	(Republic of Ireland) Drogheda United	Free
(England) Ellis Brown	(England) Boreham Wood	Undisclosed
(Togo) Steve Lawson	(Scotland) Livingston	Free

=== Players out ===
Player	To	Fee
(England) Nathan Thomas	(Scotland) Free Agent	Free
(Canada) Charlie Trafford	(Wales) Wrexham	Free
(Scotland) Ross Callachan	(Scotland) Ross County	Free
(England) Aaron Martin	(England) Port Vale	Free
(Scotland) Kyle Gourlay	(Scotland) Cove Rangers	Free
(Greece) Marios Ogkmpoe	(Greece) AEL	Free
(England) Hakeem Odoffin	(England) Rotherham United	Undisclosed
(Scotland) Callum Smith	(Scotland) Airdrieonians	Free
(Scotland) Scott McMann	(Scotland) Dundee United	Undisclosed
(Scotland) Daryl Meikle	(Scotland) Blackburn United	Free
(New Zealand) George Stanger	(Scotland) University of Stirling	Free
(Scotland) David Templeton	Retired	
(Republic of Ireland) Ryan Scully	Free agent	Free

=== Loans in ===
Player	From	Fee
(England) Joe Hilton	(England) Blackburn Rovers	Loan
(Scotland) Josh Mullin	(Scotland) Livingston	Loan
(England) Luke Matheson	(England) Wolverhampton Wanderers	Loan
(Romania) Mihai Popescu	(Scotland) Heart of Midlothian	Loan
(Scotland) Kai Kennedy	(Scotland) Rangers	Loan

=== Loans out ===
Player	To	Fee
(Scotland) Ben Stirling	(Scotland) Edinburgh City	Loan
