= 2019–20 Hamilton Academical F.C. season =

Hamilton Academical
2019–20 season
- Chairman: Allan Maitland
- Manager: Brian Rice
- Stadium: New Douglas Park
- Scottish Premiership: 11th
- Scottish Cup: Fifth round
- Scottish League Cup: Second round
- Top goalscorer: League: Marios Ogkmpoe (6); All: Marios Ogkmpoe, Lewis Smith & Ross Cunningham (7)
- Highest home attendance: 5,300 vs Celtic, Premiership, 14 September 2019
- Lowest home attendance: 756 vs Queens Park, League Cup, 13 July 2019
- Average home league attendance: 2,565
| Home colours | Away colours |

The 2019–20 season was Hamilton's sixth consecutive season in the top flight of Scottish football since their promotion at the end of the 2013–14 season. Hamilton also competed in the League Cup and the Scottish Cup.

== Summary ==
=== Season ===
On 13 March 2020, the Scottish football season was suspended with immediate effect due to the COVID-19 Coronavirus outbreak. On 9 April, the suspension of the Scottish football season was extended until at least 10 June. On 18 May 2020, the SPFL declared the end of the season determining on an average points per game, with Accies finishing in eleventh place and surviving for another season.

== Results and fixtures ==
Win Draw Loss Postponed

=== Scottish Premiership ===
| 3 August 2019 1 | Ross County | 3–0 | Hamilton Academical | Dingwall |
| 15:00 BST (UTC+1) | Chalmers 30'; Mckay 36'; Stewart 57' | Report | McKenna (yellow card) 1'; MacKinnon (yellow card) 51'; Oakley (yellow card) 71' | Stadium: Victoria Park; Attendance: 4,071; Referee: Alan Newlands |

| 10 August 2019 2 | Hamilton Academical | 2–0 | Kilmarnock | Hamilton |
| 15:00 BST (UTC+1) | Smith 20'; Oakley 49'; Easton (red card) 54' | Report | Burke (yellow card) 84' | Stadium: New Douglas Park; Attendance: 2,766; Referee: Bobby Madden |

| 24 August 2019 3 | Hamilton Academical | 1–3 | Motherwell | Hamilton |
| 15:00 BST (UTC+1) | Hamilton (red card) 20'; Cunningham 24' (pen.) | Report | Hartley 16'; Donnelly 21' (pen.), (yellow card) 88'; Long 51' | Stadium: New Douglas Park; Attendance: 2,927; Referee: Andrew Dallas |

| 31 August 2019 4 | Heart of Midlothian | 2–2 | Hamilton Academical | Edinburgh |
| 15:00 | Clare 20'; Berra (yellow card) 26', (goal) 58' | Report | Oakley 50', 73'; Collar (yellow card) 80'; MacKinnon (yellow card) 80' | Stadium: Tynecastle Park; Attendance: 15,347; Referee: Greg Aitken |

| 14 September 2019 5 | Hamilton Academical | 0–1 | Celtic | Hamilton |
| | Fjørtoft (yellow card) 45'; Gogić (yellow card) 84' | Report | Forrest 4' | Stadium: New Douglas Park; Attendance: 5,300; Referee: Don Robertson |

| 21 September 2019 6 | St Mirren | 0–0 | Hamilton Academical | Paisley |
| | McAllister (yellow card) 85' | Report | Oakley (yellow card) 21' (yellow-red card) 50'; McGowan (yellow card) 90'; Williams (yellow card) 90' | Stadium: St Mirren Park; Attendance: 4,807; Referee: David Munro |

| 28 September 2019 7 | Hamilton Academical | 2–1 | Livingston | Hamilton |
| 15:00 | Alston 45+1'; Cunningham 84' (pen.); Stubbs (yellow card) 90+1' | Report | Lithgow 15'; Robinson (yellow card) 47' | Stadium: New Douglas Park; Attendance: 1,075; Referee: Steven McLean |

| 6 October 2019 8 | Rangers | 5–0 | Hamilton Academical | Glasgow |
| 15:00 | Defoe 7', 63', 71'; Goldson 34'; Barišić 61' | Report | Stubbs (yellow card) 60' | Stadium: Ibrox Stadium; Attendance: 48,838; Referee: Nick Walsh |

| 19 October 2019 9 | Hamilton Academical | 1–1 | Hibernian | Hamilton |
| 15:00 BST | Gogić (yellow card) 34'; Cunningham 59' (pen.) | Report | Mallan 22'; Maxwell (yellow card) 59' | Stadium: New Douglas Park; Attendance: 2,680; Referee: John Beaton |

| 26 October 2019 10 | St Johnstone | 3–2 | Hamilton Academical | Perth |
| 15:00 | Wotherspoon 36', 60'; Hendry 88' | Report | Miller 25'; McGowan (yellow card) 79'; Davies 83' (pen.) | Stadium: McDiarmid Park; Attendance: 2,231; Referee: Alan Muir |

| 30 October 2019 11 | Hamilton Academical | 0–1 | Aberdeen | Hamilton |
| 19:45 GMT | Cunningham (yellow card) 62' | Report | Ferguson 14'; Campbell (yellow card) 52' | Stadium: New Douglas Park; Attendance: 1,687; Referee: Willie Collum |

| 2 November 2019 12 | Hamilton Academical | 2–2 | Ross County | Hamilton |
| 15:00 GMT | McMann (yellow card) 27'; Smith 52'; Oakley (yellow card) 62', (goal) 64'; Martin (red card) 90+3' | Report | McKay 1'; Watson (yellow card) 30'; Gardyne (yellow card) 50'; Fontaine (yellow card) 75'; Graham 88' | Stadium: New Douglas Park; Attendance: 1,268; Referee: Colin Steven |

| 9 November 2019 13 | Kilmarnock | 2–2 | Hamilton Academical | Kilmarnock |
| 15:00 GMT | El Makrini 45+2'; Brophy (yellow card) 38', (goal) 48' | Report | Miller 2'; Davies 25'; Stubbs (red card) 29'; MacKinnon (yellow card) 43'; Williams (yellow card) 90+3' | Stadium: Rugby Park; Attendance: 5,045; Referee: Gavin Duncan |

| 24 November 2019 14 | Hamilton Academical | 1−3 | Rangers | Hamilton |
| 12:15 | Smith 14'; Oakley (yellow card) 62'; Gogić (yellow card) 64' | Report | Jack 7'; Kent 43', 90+3'; Defoe (yellow card) 70'; Morelos (yellow card) 87' | Stadium: New Douglas Park; Attendance: 5,100; Referee: Steven McLean |

| 30 November 2019 15 | Livingston | 0−0 | Hamilton Academical | Livingston |
| 15:00 | | Report | Easton (yellow card) 76' | Stadium: Almondvale Stadium; Attendance: 1,076; Referee: William Collum |

| 4 December 2019 16 | Celtic | 2–1 | Hamilton Academical | Glasgow |
| | Christie 13'; Brown 90+2' | Report | Ogboe 90' | Stadium: Celtic Park; Attendance: 54,584; Referee: Alan Muir |

| 7 December 2019 17 | Hamilton Academical | 0−1 | St Mirren | Hamilton |
| 15:00 | Gogić (red card) 77'; Martin (yellow card) 89' | Report | MacPherson 52'; Magennis (yellow card) 56'; Waters (yellow card) 90'; Andreu (yellow card) 90' | Stadium: New Douglas Park; Attendance: 1,962; Referee: Don Robertson |

| 14 December 2019 18 | Aberdeen | 1–0 | Hamilton Academical | Aberdeen |
| 15:00 GMT | Cosgrove 53' | Report | Stubbs (yellow card) 85' | Stadium: Pittodrie Stadium; Attendance: 12,325; Referee: William Collum |

| 21 December 2019 19 | Hamilton Academical | 2−1 | Heart of Midlothian | Hamilton |
| 15:00 | Miller 64', (yellow card) 79'; Collar 72'; McGowan (yellow card) 77'; Easton (yellow card) 90+2' | Report | MacLean (yellow card) 21'; Smith (yellow card) 58'; Halkett (yellow card) 71'; Bozanic 82'; Whelan (yellow card) 90+6' | Stadium: New Douglas Park; Attendance: 2,654; Referee: David Munro |

| 26 December 2019 20 | Hamilton Academical | 0−1 | St Johnstone | Hamilton |
| 15:00 | Easton (yellow card) 83' | Report | Davidson (yellow card) 59'; McCann 80'; Hendry (yellow card) 81' | Stadium: New Douglas Park; Attendance: 1,536; Referee: Gavin Duncan |

| 29 December 2019 21 | Motherwell | 1−2 | Hamilton Academical | Motherwell |
| 15:00 GMT | Long 5'; Hylton (yellow card) 63'; O'Hara (yellow card) 75' | Report | Martin (yellow card) 11'; Stubbs (yellow card) 52'; McGowan 68'; Moyo 77'; Alston (yellow card) 81' | Stadium: Fir Park; Attendance: 6,048; Referee: John Beaton |

| 22 January 2020 22 | Hibernian | 2−1 | Hamilton Academical | Edinburgh |
| 19:45 GMT | Doidge 64'; Hanlon 86' | Report | Gogic 18'; Fjørtoft (yellow card) 53'; Williams (yellow card) 81'; McMann (yellow card) 82' | Stadium: Easter Road; Attendance: 14,674; Referee: Andrew Dallas |

| 25 January 2020 23 | Hamilton Academical | 2–4 | Livingston | Hamilton |
| 15:00 | Want 13'; Woods 57'; Fjørtoft (yellow card) 77' | Report | Sibbald 15'; Taylor-Sinclair 32'; Lawless 62' (pen.); Pittman 65'; Souda (yellow card) 71' | Stadium: New Douglas Park; Attendance: 1,487; Referee: Bobby Madden |

| 2 February 2020 24 | Hamilton Academical | 1–4 | Celtic | Hamilton |
| | Gogić (yellow card) 14'; Ogkmpoe 26'; Hamilton (yellow card) 34'; McGowan (yellow card) 43'; Collar (yellow card) 64' | Report | Griffiths (yellow card) 13'; Édouard 35', 81'; Taylor (yellow card) 66'; Jullien 78'; Forrest 90+1' | Stadium: New Douglas Park; Attendance: 4,708; Referee: Nick Walsh |

| 5 February 2020 25 | St Mirren | 1–1 | Hamilton Academical | Paisley |
| 19:45 | Durmuş 73'; Obika (yellow card) 64'; Foley (yellow card) 90+6' | Report | Templeton 25'; Miller (yellow card) 70' | Stadium: St Mirren Park; Attendance: 4,537; Referee: Alan Newlands |

| 11 February 2020 26 | Hamilton Academical | 1–3 | Aberdeen | Hamilton |
| 19:45 GMT | Ogkmpoe 84' | Report | Main 15'; McGinn 23'; McLennan 45+4'; Considine (yellow card) 51' | Stadium: New Douglas Park; Attendance: 1,218; Referee: Greg Aitken |

| 15 February 2020 27 | Heart of Midlothian | 2–2 | Hamilton Academical | Edinburgh |
| 15:00 | Walker 48', (yellow card) 77'; Smith (yellow card) 84'; Halkett 87' | Report | Ogkmpoe 5', 16' (pen.); Hamilton (red card) 21'; Collar (yellow card) 73' | Stadium: Tynecastle Stadium; Attendance: 16,437; Referee: Kevin Clancy |

| 22 February 2020 28 | Hamilton Academical | 0–0 | Motherwell | Hamilton |
| 15:00 GMT (UTC) | Hunt (yellow card) 4'; Gogić (yellow card) 59' | Report | Long (yellow card) 31' (yellow-red card) 37'; O'Hara (yellow card) 34'; Gillespie (yellow card) 73'; Gallagher (yellow card) 90+3' | Stadium: New Douglas Park; Attendance: 2,531; Referee: Colin Steven |

| 4 March 2020 29 | Rangers | 0–1 | Hamilton Academical | Glasgow |
| 19:45 GMT (UTC) | | Report | Moyo 56' | Stadium: Ibrox Stadium; Attendance: 48,167; Referee: Nick Walsh |

| 7 March 2020 30 | Hamilton Academical | 1–0 | Kilmarnock | Hamilton |
| 15:00 GMT (UTC) | Miller (red card) 78'; Ogkmpoe 90' (pen.) | Report | | Stadium: New Douglas Park; Attendance: 2,145; Referee: William Collum |

=== Scottish League Cup ===
==== Group stage ====
| 13 July 2019 Group Stage | Hamilton Academical | 0–0 (5–6 p) | Queen's Park | Hamilton |
| | Williams (yellow card) 98' | Report | Block (yellow card) 44'; Galt (yellow card) 55'; Mortimer (yellow card) 81'; Magee (yellow card) 90+4' | Stadium: New Douglas Park; Attendance: 756; Referee: Nick Walsh |
| | Penalties |
| | Oakley (penalty scored); Alston (penalty missed); McGowan (penalty scored); Ogkmpoe (penalty scored); McKenna (penalty scored); McMann (penalty scored); MacKinnon (penalty missed) | | (penalty scored) Galt; (penalty scored) Clark; (penalty scored) Moore; (penalty missed) McGrory; (penalty scored) Grant; (penalty scored) Agyeman; (penalty scored) Block |

| 17 July 2019 Group Stage | Clyde | 1–3 | Hamilton Academical | Glasgow |
| | Wallace (yellow card) 45'; Syvertsen 57'; Grant (yellow card) 59' | Report | McMann 31'; Alston 50'; Smith 76' | Stadium: Hampden Park; Attendance: 504; Referee: Euan Anderson |

| 20 July 2019 Group Stage | Hamilton Academical | 2–2 (6–5 p) | Partick Thistle | Hamilton |
| | Cunningham 17', 54'; McKenna (yellow card) 81' | Report | Williamson 16'; Gordon 73' | Stadium: New Douglas Park; Attendance: 1,693; Referee: John Beaton |
| | Penalties |
| | Oakley (penalty scored); Cunningham (penalty scored); McKenna (penalty scored); Gogić (penalty scored); Smith (penalty scored); McMann (penalty scored) | | (penalty scored) Bannigan; (penalty scored) Gordon; (penalty scored) Miller; (penalty scored) Mansell; (penalty scored) Jones; (penalty missed) De Vita |

| 27 July 2019 Group Stage | Airdrieonians | 2–3 | Hamilton Academical | Airdrie |
| | Smith 10'; Cowan (yellow card) 21'; Roy 24'; Gallagher (yellow card) 60' | Report | Cunningham 48' (pen.), 60' (pen.), (yellow card) 85'; MacKinnon (yellow card) 30'; McGowan (yellow card) 53'; Ogkmpoe 89' | Stadium: Excelsior Stadium; Attendance: 814; Referee: Gavin Duncan |

==== Knockout phase ====
| 17 August 2019 Second Round | Kilmarnock | 1–0 (a.e.t.) | Hamilton Academical | Kilmarnock |
| 15:00 | Power (yellow card) 76'; Thomas 113'; Dicker (yellow card) 120' | Report | Gogić (yellow card) 65'; Miller (yellow card) 98' | Stadium: Rugby Park; Attendance: 3,762; Referee: Kevin Clancy |

=== Scottish Cup ===
| 18 January 2020 Fourth round | Hamilton Academical | 5–0 | Edinburgh City | Hamilton |
| 15:00 | Dales 22'; McMann 26'; Martin 44'; Winter 80'; Miller 84' | | | Stadium: New Douglas Park; Attendance: 1,040; Referee: Euan Anderson |

| 8 February 2020 Fifth round | Hamilton Academical | 1–4 | Rangers | Hamilton |
| 12:31 | Smith 38' | | Arfield 25', 90'; Aribo 68'; Morelos 85' | Stadium: New Douglas Park; Attendance: 4,050; Referee: Alan Muir |

== Squad statistics ==
=== Appearances ===
As of 7 March 2020

| No. | Pos | Nat | Player | Total | | Premiership | | League Cup | | Scottish Cup | |
| No. | Pos | Nat | Player | Apps | Goals | Apps | Goals | Apps | Goals | Apps | Goals |
|---|---|---|---|---|---|---|---|---|---|---|---|
| 2 | DF | (England) ENG | Aaron McGowan | 29 | 1 | 22 | 1 | 4+1 | 0 | 2 | 0 |
| 3 | DF | (Scotland) SCO | Scott McMann | 34 | 2 | 27 | 0 | 5 | 1 | 2 | 1 |
| 4 | DF | (Scotland) SCO | Ciaran McKenna | 7 | 0 | 2+1 | 0 | 4 | 0 | 0 | 0 |
| 5 | DF | (Norway) NOR | Markus Fjørtoft | 10 | 0 | 5+2 | 0 | 0+2 | 0 | 1 | 0 |
| 6 | DF | (England) ENG | Johnny Hunt | 18 | 0 | 10+6 | 0 | 1 | 0 | 0+1 | 0 |
| 7 | MF | (England) ENG | Will Collar | 19 | 1 | 14+2 | 1 | 1 | 0 | 1+1 | 0 |
| 8 | FW | (England) ENG | Steve Davies | 15 | 2 | 5+8 | 2 | 1 | 0 | 1 | 0 |
| 9 | FW | (England) ENG | George Oakley | 27 | 4 | 17+4 | 4 | 2+3 | 0 | 1 | 0 |
| 10 | MF | (Scotland) SCO | Blair Alston | 25 | 2 | 14+5 | 1 | 4 | 1 | 1+1 | 0 |
| 11 | FW | (England) ENG | Mikel Miller | 26 | 4 | 16+5 | 3 | 1+2 | 0 | 1+1 | 1 |
| 12 | DF | (England) ENG | Sam Woods | 3 | 1 | 3 | 1 | 0 | 0 | 0 | 0 |
| 13 | DF | (Cyprus) CYP | Alex Gogić | 36 | 1 | 29 | 1 | 4+1 | 0 | 2 | 0 |
| 14 | FW | (Scotland) SCO | Ross Cunningham | 12 | 7 | 6+3 | 3 | 0 | 0 | 3 | 4 |
| 16 | MF | (Scotland) SCO | David Templeton | 6 | 1 | 3+3 | 1 | 0 | 0 | 0 | 0 |
| 19 | FW | (Scotland) SCO | Andy Winter | 5 | 1 | 0+3 | 0 | 0 | 0 | 1+1 | 1 |
| 20 | FW | (Zimbabwe) ZIM | David Moyo | 20 | 2 | 8+12 | 2 | 0 | 0 | 0 | 0 |
| 21 | DF | (Scotland) SCO | Shaun Want | 13 | 1 | 9+2 | 1 | 1+1 | 0 | 0 | 0 |
| 22 | GK | (Scotland) SCO | Kyle Gourlay | 0 | 0 | 0 | 0 | 0 | 0 | 0 | 0 |
| 23 | GK | (Scotland) SCO | Ryan Fulton | 0 | 0 | 0 | 0 | 0 | 0 | 0 | 0 |
| 24 | DF | (Scotland) SCO | Brian Easton | 23 | 0 | 17+1 | 0 | 3 | 0 | 2 | 0 |
| 25 | MF | (Scotland) SCO | Scott Martin | 21 | 1 | 18+2 | 0 | 0 | 0 | 1 | 1 |
| 26 | MF | (England) ENG | Andy Dales | 4 | 1 | 1+1 | 0 | 0 | 0 | 2 | 1 |
| 28 | MF | (Scotland) SCO | Lewis Smith | 28 | 5 | 17+6 | 3 | 4 | 1 | 1 | 1 |
| 29 | MF | (Scotland) SCO | Jack Breen | 0 | 0 | 0 | 0 | 0 | 0 | 0 | 0 |
| 30 | FW | (Scotland) SCO | Steven Boyd | 0 | 0 | 0 | 0 | 0 | 0 | 0 | 0 |
| 31 | GK | (Northern Ireland) NIR | Luke Southwood | 16 | 0 | 15 | 0 | 0 | 0 | 1 | 0 |
| 32 | DF | (Scotland) SCO | Leon McCann | 0 | 0 | 0 | 0 | 0 | 0 | 0 | 0 |
| 33 | MF | (Scotland) SCO | Reegan Mimnaugh | 3 | 0 | 0+1 | 0 | 1+1 | 0 | 0 | 0 |
| 40 | DF | (Scotland) SCO | Jamie Hamilton | 14 | 0 | 11+1 | 0 | 1 | 0 | 1 | 0 |
| 42 | MF | (Scotland) SCO | Charlie Reilly | 0 | 0 | 0 | 0 | 0 | 0 | 0 | 0 |
| 99 | FW | (Greece) GRE | Marios Ogkmpoe | 29 | 7 | 16+7 | 6 | 3+2 | 1 | 0+1 | 0 |
Players who left the club during the 2018–19 season
| 1 | GK | (Wales) WAL | Owain Fôn Williams | 21 | 0 | 15 | 0 | 5 | 0 | 1 | 0 |
| 12 | MF | (Nigeria) NGA | Korede Adedoyin | 0 | 0 | 0 | 0 | 0 | 0 | 0 | 0 |
| 15 | MF | (Scotland) SCO | Ronan Hughes | 12 | 0 | 5+3 | 0 | 3+1 | 0 | 0 | 0 |
| 17 | MF | (Germany) GER | Adrian Beck | 6 | 0 | 2+4 | 0 | 0 | 0 | 0 | 0 |
| 18 | MF | (Scotland) SCO | Darian MacKinnon | 11 | 0 | 3+3 | 0 | 3+2 | 0 | 0 | 0 |
| 26 | DF | (England) ENG | Sam Stubbs | 20 | 0 | 19 | 0 | 1 | 0 | 0 | 0 |
| 27 | DF | (New Zealand) NZL | George Stanger | 1 | 0 | 1 | 0 | 0 | 0 | 0 | 0 |

== Team statistics ==
=== League table ===
| Pos | Team | Pld | W | D | L | GF | GA | GD | Pts | PPG | Qualification or relegation (Note: All play-off matches were cancelled, as clubs voted to curtail the season due to the COVID-19 pandemic.) |
|---|---|---|---|---|---|---|---|---|---|---|---|
| 8 | Kilmarnock | 30 | 9 | 6 | 15 | 31 | 41 | −10 | 33 | 1.10 | |
| 9 | St Mirren | 30 | 7 | 8 | 15 | 24 | 41 | −17 | 29 | 0.97 | |
| 10 | Ross County | 30 | 7 | 8 | 15 | 29 | 60 | −31 | 29 | 0.97 | |
| 11 | Hamilton Academical | 30 | 6 | 9 | 15 | 30 | 50 | −20 | 27 | 0.90 | |
| 12 | Heart of Midlothian (R) | 30 | 4 | 11 | 15 | 31 | 52 | −21 | 23 | 0.77 | Relegation to the Championship |

Source: BBC SPFL
Rules for classification: 1) Points per game; 2) Goal difference; 3) Goals scored; 4) Head-to-head points; 5) Head-to-Head goal difference; 6) Play-off (only if deciding champion, UEFA competitions qualification, second stage group allocation or relegation).
(R) Relegated

=== League Cup table ===
| Pos | Team | Pld | W | PW | PL | L | GF | GA | GD | Pts | Qualification |
|---|---|---|---|---|---|---|---|---|---|---|---|
| 1 | Partick Thistle | 4 | 3 | 0 | 1 | 0 | 8 | 5 | +3 | 10 | Qualification for the Second Round |
| 2 | Hamilton Academical | 4 | 2 | 1 | 1 | 0 | 8 | 5 | +3 | 9 | Qualification for the Second Round |
| 3 | Airdrieonians | 4 | 1 | 1 | 0 | 2 | 7 | 8 | −1 | 5 | |
| 4 | Queen's Park | 4 | 0 | 2 | 1 | 1 | 4 | 5 | −1 | 5 | |
| 5 | Clyde | 4 | 0 | 0 | 1 | 3 | 6 | 10 | −4 | 1 | |

Rules for classification: 1) goal difference, 2) goals scored, 3) away goals scored, 4) matches won, 5) away matches won, 6) drawing of lots.

== Transfers ==
=== Players in ===
| Player | From | Fee |
|---|---|---|
| (Scotland) Brian Easton | (Scotland) St Johnstone | Free |
| (Norway) Brian Easton | (New Zealand) Southern United | Free |
| (Scotland) Ciaran McKenna | (Scotland) Falkirk | Free |
| (Scotland) Blair Alston | (Scotland) St Johnstone | Free |
| (Wales) Owain Fôn Williams | (Scotland) Inverness CT | Free |
| (England) Will Collar | (England) Brighton & Hove Albion | Undisclosed |
| (England) Johnny Hunt | (England) Stevenage | Free |
| (Scotland) Kyle Gourlay | (Scotland) Dundee | Free |
| (Zimbabwe) David Moyo | (England) St Albans City | Free |
| (Scotland) David Templeton | (England) Burton Albion | Free |

=== Players out ===
| Player | To | Fee |
|---|---|---|
| (Scotland) Dougie Imrie | Retired | |
| (England) Tom Taiwo | Retired | |
| (Germany) Lennard Sowah | Free agent | Free |
| (Democratic Republic of the Congo) Delphin Tshiembe | (Faroe Islands) HB Tórshavn | Free |
| (England) Matthew Kilgallon | (India) Hyderabad FC | Free |
| (England) Jacob Marsden | (England) Needham Market | Free |
| (Scotland) James Keatings | (England) Inverness CT | Free |
| (England) Gary Woods | (England) Oldham Athletic | Free |
| (Scotland) Ziggy Gordon | (Australia) Central Coast Mariners | Free |
| (Scotland) Darian MacKinnon | (Scotland) Partick Thistle | Free |

=== Loans in ===
| Player | From | Fee |
|---|---|---|
| (Nigeria) Korede Adedoyin | (England) Everton | Loan |
| (Northern Ireland) Luke Southwood | (England) Reading | Loan |
| (England) Sam Stubbs | (England) Middlesbrough | Loan |
| (Germany) Adrian Beck | (Belgium) Union Saint-Gilloise | Loan |
| (England) Andy Dales | (England) Scunthorpe United | Loan |
| (England) Sam Woods | (England) Crystal Palace | Loan |

=== Loans out ===
| Player | To | Fee |
|---|---|---|
| (New Zealand) George Stanger | (Scotland) Forfar Athletic | Loan |
| (Wales) Owain Fôn Williams | (Scotland) Dunfermline Athletic | Loan |
| (Scotland) Ronan Hughes | (Scotland) Stirling Albion | Loan |
