= Ross Cunningham =

Scottish footballer

Personal information
- Date of birth: 23 May 1998 (age 28)
- Place of birth: Livingston, West Lothian, Scotland
- Position: Forward

Team information
- Current team: Kelty Hearts
- Number: 26

Youth career
- 2009–2015: Hamilton Academical

Senior career*
| Years | Team | Apps | (Gls) |
| 2015–2020 | Hamilton Academical | 21 | (3) |
| 2018–2019 | → Forfar Athletic (loan) | 10 | (1) |
| 2020 | → Clyde (loan) | 6 | (0) |
| 2020–2023 | Clyde | 65 | (13) |
| 2023–2025 | Kelty Hearts | 59 | (17) |
| 2025–2026 | Stirling Albion | 18 | (3) |
| 2026– | Kelty Hearts | 13 | (2) |

International career
| 2013 | Scotland U15 | 3 | (0) |
- * Club domestic league appearances and goals as of 4 May 2026

Ross Cunningham (born 23 May 1998) is a Scottish professional footballer who plays as a forward for Scottish League Two club Kelty Hearts.

== Early life ==
Cunningham was born in Livingston, West Lothian, Scotland.

== Club career ==
Having been with the club as a youth player for several years, Cunningham made his senior debut for Hamilton Academical on 14 May 2016. He signed a new two-year contract with Accies later that month.

Cunningham was loaned to Scottish League One club Forfar Athletic in September 2018. He scored a goal on his debut appearance for Forfar, in a 3–1 defeat to Arbroath on 15 September. He returned to Hamilton in January 2019, then suffered an ankle injury which ruled him out for the rest of the season. In June 2019 he signed a contract extension with Hamilton, until summer 2020.

He scored his first goals for the club in the early-season group stage of the 2019–20 Scottish League Cup, then registered his first in the Scottish Premiership with a late penalty to secure a 2–1 win over Livingston.

On 5 February 2020, Cunningham moved on loan to Clyde for the remainder of the season.

Cunningham left Hamilton in August 2020, after 11 years with the club. In September 2020 he returned to Clyde on a permanent contract.

On 24 May 2023, Cunningham signed for Kelty Hearts.

On 26 May 2025, Cunningham signed for Scottish League Two club Stirling Albion.

== International career ==
Cunningham was selected for Scotland training squads at under-14 level in 2012, and made three appearances at under-15 level in 2013.

== Career statistics ==
As of matches played 4 May 2024

Appearances and goals by club, season and competition
| Club | Season | League | | | Scottish Cup | | League Cup | | Other | | Total | |
| Club | Season | Division | Apps | Goals | Apps | Goals | Apps | Goals | Apps | Goals | Apps | Goals |
|---|---|---|---|---|---|---|---|---|---|---|---|---|
| Hamilton Academical | 2015–16 | Scottish Premiership | 1 | 0 | 0 | 0 | 0 | 0 | 0 | 0 | 1 | 0 |
| Hamilton Academical | 2016–17 | Scottish Premiership | 2 | 0 | 1 | 0 | 1 | 0 | 0 | 0 | 4 | 0 |
| Hamilton Academical | 2017–18 | Scottish Premiership | 6 | 0 | 1 | 0 | 0 | 0 | 0 | 0 | 7 | 0 |
| Hamilton Academical | 2018–19 | Scottish Premiership | 3 | 0 | 0 | 0 | 2 | 0 | 0 | 0 | 5 | 0 |
| Hamilton Academical | 2019–20 | Scottish Premiership | 9 | 3 | 0 | 0 | 3 | 4 | 0 | 0 | 12 | 7 |
| Hamilton Academical | Total | | 21 | 3 | 2 | 0 | 6 | 4 | 0 | 0 | 29 | 7 |
| Forfar Athletic (loan) | 2018–19 | Scottish League One | 10 | 1 | 0 | 0 | 0 | 0 | 0 | 0 | 10 | 1 |
| Clyde (loan) | 2019–20 | Scottish League One | 6 | 0 | 1 | 0 | 0 | 0 | 0 | 0 | 7 | 0 |
| Clyde | 2020–21 | Scottish League One | 18 | 2 | 3 | 0 | 4 | 1 | 0 | 0 | 25 | 3 |
| Clyde | 2021–22 | Scottish League One | 20 | 4 | 1 | 0 | 3 | 0 | 1 (Note: Appearances in Scottish Challenge Cup) | 0 | 25 | 4 |
| Clyde | 2022–23 | Scottish League One | 27 | 7 | 0 | 0 | 4 | 2 | 2 | 1 | 33 | 10 |
| Clyde | Total | | 65 | 13 | 4 | 0 | 11 | 3 | 3 | 1 | 83 | 17 |
| Kelty Hearts | 2023–24 | Scottish League One | 27 | 4 | 2 | 0 | 4 | 2 | 2 | 0 | 35 | 6 |
| Career total | | | 130 | 21 | 9 | 0 | 21 | 9 | 5 | 1 | 164 | 31 |
