= Ronan Hughes =

Scottish footballer

Personal information
- Date of birth: 15 December 1998 (age 27)
- Place of birth: Scotland
- Position: Midfielder

Team information
- Current team: Stranraer
- Number: 15

Youth career
- 2009–2015: Hamilton Academical

Senior career*
Years	Team	Apps	(Gls)
2015–2022	Hamilton Academical	45	(3)
2018–2019	→ Stirling Albion (loan)	29	(1)
2020	→ Stirling Albion (loan)	5	(0)
2022–2023	East Kilbride		
2025–	Stranraer	23	(1)
- * Club domestic league appearances and goals as of 6 May 2026

Ronan Hughes (born 15 December 1998) is a Scottish professional footballer who used to play for Stranraer as a midfielder.

== Club career ==
Hughes turned professional with Hamilton Academical in January 2015. He had first joined the club at the age of 10, and played for them every youth level. He made his senior debut on 11 May 2016. He moved on loan to Stirling Albion in September 2018.

In June 2019 he signed a contract extension with Hamilton, until summer 2020. He scored his first goals for Hamilton when he scored twice in a 5-3 defeat to St Johnstone on 17 October 2020.

He returned to Stirling Albion on loan in January 2020.

He was released by Hamilton at the end of his contract in May 2022, signing for East Kilbride in June 2022.

== International career ==
Born in Scotland, and involved in national training squads at under-14 level but never capped for higher age groups, Hughes is also eligible to play for Wales at international level through his father's origins.

== Career statistics ==
As of match played 29 April 2022

Appearances and goals by club, season and competition
Club	Season	League			Scottish Cup		League Cup		Other		Total	
Club	Season	Division	Apps	Goals	Apps	Goals	Apps	Goals	Apps	Goals	Apps	Goals
Hamilton Academical	2015–16	Premiership	2	0	0	0	0	0	0	0	2	0
Hamilton Academical	2016–17	Premiership	2	0	0	0	2	0	0	0	4	0
Hamilton Academical	2017–18	Premiership	3	0	1	0	0	0	0	0	4	0
Hamilton Academical	2018–19	Premiership	0	0	0	0	0	0	0	0	0	0
Hamilton Academical	2019–20	Premiership	8	0	0	0	4	0	0	0	12	0
Hamilton Academical	2020–20	Premiership	16	2	1	0	1	0	0	0	18	2
Hamilton Academical	2021–22	Championship	14	1	1	0	4	2	1	0	20	3
Hamilton Academical	Total		45	3	3	0	11	2	1	0	60	5
Stirling Albion (loan)	2018–19	League Two	29	1	0	0	0	0	0	0	29	1
Stirling Albion (loan)	2019–20	League Two	5	0	0	0	0	0	0	0	5	0
Career total			79	4	3	0	11	2	1	0	94	6
