= Brian Easton (footballer) =

Scottish footballer

Personal information
- Full name: Brian Neil Easton
- Date of birth: 5 March 1988 (age 38)
- Place of birth: Glasgow, Scotland
- Position: Defender

Team information
- Current team: East Fife
- Number: 5

Youth career
- ?–2006: Hamilton Academical

Senior career*
| Years | Team | Apps | (Gls) |
| 2006–2009 | Hamilton Academical | 103 | (2) |
| 2009–2012 | Burnley | 33 | (1) |
| 2010 | → Hamilton Academical (loan) | 12 | (0) |
| 2012–2013 | Dundee | 17 | (0) |
| 2013–2019 | St Johnstone | 134 | (1) |
| 2019–2023 | Hamilton Academical | 77 | (0) |
| 2023– | East Fife | 81 | (5) |

International career^{‡}
| 2008–2010 | Scotland U21 | 2 | (0) |
| 2009 | Scotland B | 1 | (0) |
- * Club domestic league appearances and goals as of 4 May 2026 ‡ National team caps and goals as of 7 May 2009

Brian Neil Easton (born 5 March 1988) is a Scottish footballer who plays as a defender for Scottish League One club East Fife. Easton started his career with Hamilton Academical, winning the Scottish First Division championship in 2008. He was sold to English club Burnley in 2009 but was mainly a backup squad member, being loaned back to Hamilton in 2010 and leaving at the end of his contract in 2012; he then signed for Dundee.

In June 2013, Easton's contract with Dundee ended and he moved to St Johnstone, initially on a one-year deal, however remained with the club for six seasons, winning the Scottish Cup in 2014 but being unavailable for over a year through injury. He rejoined Hamilton in the summer of 2019. He then signed for East Fife in 2023.

Easton played for the Scotland under-21s and B team in his early career.

== Club career ==
=== Hamilton Academical ===
Easton started his career with Hamilton, debuting as a substitute for Javier Payo in the 70th minute of a 1–0 win versus Dundee; on 29 September 2006 and he received a straight red card in a 1–1 draw versus Queen of the South. On 3 March 2008, Easton scored his first goal of his career in a 3–0 win over Airdrie United. Following his debut, Easton was increasingly involved in the first-team throughout his first spell with the Accies.

Easton continued to be involved in the first-team in the 2007–08 season, with thirty-six appearances and in May 2008 was awarded the young player of the month for April. Shortly after, he signed a new three-year contract with Hamilton after helping his side to the Scottish First Division title.

The following season, with Accies promoted to the top division, Easton made his Scottish Premier League debut, as Hamilton beat Dundee United on the opening day. On 25 October 2008, Easton scored his first SPL goal against Rangers in a 3–1 loss; on 22 November, he scored an own-goal as Hamilton drew 1–1 with Dundee United. Easton made his 100th league appearance for Hamilton against Motherwell on 16 May 2009. In the January transfer window, the club's chairman Ronnie MacDonald said he refused to sell his youngsters, especially Easton, as he attracted interest from clubs in England. Easton's good form throughout the season attracted the interest of Derby County manager Nigel Clough. With interest from Derby, Easton insisted the transfer speculation didn't affect him.

=== Burnley ===
Burnley agreed a fee with Hamilton Academical for Easton's transfer on 13 July 2009. He signed a three-year contract with Burnley the next day. Easton made his Burnley debut in a friendly match, in a 5–0 win over VC Fusion. and made his competitive debut in the second round of the Football League Cup, as Burnley win 2–1 over Hartlepool United. However, he had yet to make his Premier League debut, having his first-team opportunities limited and was loaned back to Hamilton. Despite the lack of first team minutes, Easton stated he hoped to take his chance when it came.

==== Loan to Hamilton ====
On 29 January 2010, Hamilton welcomed back Easton on loan until the end of the 2009–10 season. One day later, he made his debut in a 1–0 loss against Celtic. After the match, Easton said he could help the club stay in the SPL, and that his time with Burnley had made him a better player. In April, Easton said he wanted to stay on loan until the end of the season. At the end of the season, Easton returned to his parent club, having helped Accies avoid relegation.

==== Return to Burnley ====
On returning to Burnley, Easton said he vowed to become a regular player next season, with the club relegated back to the Championship. However, he was continually left out of the squad from the start of the season until October, when he made his league debut on 19 October 2010 against Barnsley after stepping in for the injured Danny Fox. He scored his first goal for Burnley in a 3–2 defeat to Leeds United on 11 December 2010. However, Easton's first-team opportunities were still limited, having been an unused substitute in most of the matches.

Ahead of the new season, Easton's playing time increased, playing in the left-back position, after Fox left for Southampton, and he stated he expected to earn his chance in the first team. Later in the season, Easton established himself in the first team for the first half; however, he soon went down in the queue for selection, due to the arrival of Daniel Lafferty and good form of Kieran Trippier and Ben Mee. Manager Eddie Howe said Easton had no future at Burnley and would leave the club and will not be offered a new deal when his current deal expired, which took place in May 2012.

=== Dundee ===
Easton signed for SPL club Dundee on 6 September 2012. After joining Dundee, he revealed that he had found himself in 'limbo', and praised the role of Kevin McDonald in helping him join the club.

Having been an unused substitute in three matches, Easton finally made his debut, making his first start and playing 90 minutes, as Dundee lost 3–0 against Hibernian. Soon after, he suffered a hamstring injury during a 2–0 loss against Aberdeen; the injury ruled him out for two months. Despite making seventeen appearances, Easton was released along with ten players following Dundee's relegation.

=== St Johnstone ===
On 8 July 2013, Easton signed a one-year contract with St Johnstone after being released by Dundee. After the move, he vowed to work his way into the first team.

Easton made his debut, playing in left midfield, in a 0–0 draw against Kilmarnock, where he make his first start before coming off in the second half. Easton established himself in the left back position. In late-December 2013, he sustained a hamstring injury during a match against Dundee United and was out for a few weeks. Having made sixteen appearances so far, it was announced that Easton, along with Tam Scobbie, had signed a new contract extension to run to the end of the 2014–15 season. Easton made his return from injury on 29 March 2014, in a 1–1 draw against Partick Thistle.

In the Scottish Cup Final, Easton started as a left-back when St Johnstone beat Dundee United 2–0 to win the Scottish Cup for the first time in their 130-year history.

Easton was injured in December 2017, and did not return to action until playing in reserve team games in February 2019.

=== Return to Hamilton ===
In May 2019 he returned to first club Hamilton Academical, signing a one-and-a-half-year contract extension on 13 January 2020 after a successful first six months back at the club. Easton left Hamilton in June 2023, after the club had been relegated to League One.

=== East Fife ===
Easton signed a one-year contract with East Fife during the 2023 close season.

== International career ==
Easton made his debut for Scotland's under-21s against Northern Ireland, at New Douglas Park, in November 2008. He then represented the Scotland B side in May 2009 against the same nation.

== Career statistics ==
As of 11 July 2021

| Club | Season | League | | | National Cup | | League Cup | | Other | | Total | |
| Club | Season | Division | Apps | Goals | Apps | Goals | Apps | Goals | Apps | Goals | Apps | Goals |
|---|---|---|---|---|---|---|---|---|---|---|---|---|
| Hamilton Academical | 2006–07 | Scottish First Division | 32 | 1 | 1 | 0 | 1 | 0 | 2 (Note: Appearance(s) in Scottish League Challenge Cup) | 0 | 35 | 1 |
| Hamilton Academical | 2007–08 | Scottish First Division | 36 | 0 | 2 | 0 | 3 | 0 | 1 | 0 | 42 | 0 |
| Hamilton Academical | 2008–09 | Scottish Premier League | 35 | 1 | 3 | 0 | 3 | 0 | — | | 41 | 1 |
| Hamilton Academical | Total | | 103 | 2 | 6 | 0 | 7 | 0 | 3 | 0 | 119 | 2 |
| Burnley | 2009–10 | Premier League | 0 | 0 | 0 | 0 | 1 | 0 | — | | 1 | 0 |
| Burnley | 2010–11 | Championship | 12 | 1 | 0 | 0 | 1 | 0 | — | | 13 | 1 |
| Burnley | 2011–12 | Championship | 21 | 0 | 1 | 0 | 3 | 0 | — | | 25 | 0 |
| Burnley | Total | | 33 | 1 | 1 | 0 | 5 | 0 | 0 | 0 | 39 | 1 |
| Hamilton Academical (loan) | 2009–10 | Scottish Premier League | 12 | 0 | 0 | 0 | 0 | 0 | — | | 12 | 0 |
| Dundee | 2012–13 | Scottish Premier League | 17 | 0 | 2 | 0 | 0 | 0 | — | | 19 | 0 |
| St Johnstone | 2013–14 | Scottish Premiership | 23 | 0 | 5 | 0 | 3 | 0 | 1 (Note: Appearance(s) in UEFA Europa League) | 0 | 32 | 0 |
| St Johnstone | 2014–15 | Scottish Premiership | 31 | 0 | 2 | 0 | 2 | 0 | 4 | 0 | 39 | 0 |
| St Johnstone | 2015–16 | Scottish Premiership | 29 | 1 | 1 | 0 | 3 | 0 | 2 | 0 | 35 | 1 |
| St Johnstone | 2016–17 | Scottish Premiership | 37 | 0 | 2 | 0 | 6 | 0 | — | | 45 | 0 |
| St Johnstone | 2017–18 | Scottish Premiership | 13 | 0 | 0 | 0 | 1 | 0 | 1 | 0 | 15 | 0 |
| St Johnstone | 2018–19 | Scottish Premiership | 1 | 0 | 0 | 0 | 0 | 0 | — | | 1 | 0 |
| St Johnstone | Total | | 134 | 1 | 10 | 0 | 15 | 0 | 8 | 0 | 167 | 1 |
| Hamilton Academical | 2019–20 | Scottish Premiership | 18 | 0 | 2 | 0 | 3 | 0 | — | | 23 | 0 |
| Hamilton Academical | 2020–21 | Scottish Premiership | 24 | 0 | 1 | 0 | 1 | 0 | — | | 26 | 0 |
| Hamilton Academical | 2021–22 | Scottish Championship | 0 | 0 | 0 | 0 | 1 | 0 | 0 | 0 | 1 | 0 |
| Hamilton Academical | Total | | 42 | 0 | 3 | 0 | 5 | 0 | 0 | 0 | 50 | 0 |
| Career total | | | 341 | 4 | 22 | 0 | 32 | 0 | 11 | 0 | 406 | 4 |

== Honours ==
=== Club ===
Hamilton Academical

- Scottish Football League First Division: 2007–08
- Scottish Challenge Cup: 2022–23

St Johnstone

- Scottish Cup: 2013–14
