= Scott Martin (footballer) =

Scottish footballer

Personal information
- Full name: Scott Anthony Martin
- Date of birth: 1 April 1997 (age 29)
- Place of birth: Glasgow, Scotland
- Position: Defensive midfielder

Team information
- Current team: Queen's Park
- Number: 26

Youth career
- 2005–2007: Celtic
- 2007–2016: Hibernian

Senior career*
Years	Team	Apps	(Gls)
2014–2018	Hibernian	9	(0)
2015–2016	→ Forfar Athletic (loan)	24	(2)
2017–2018	→ Arbroath (loan)	22	(0)
2018–2025	Hamilton Academical	161	(1)
2025-2026	Partick Thistle	10	(0)
2026	→ Queen's Park (loan)	10	(0)
2026–	Queen's Park	2	(0)

International career^{‡}
2015	Scotland U19	2	(0)
- * Club domestic league appearances and goals as of 13:20, 9 August 2026 (UTC) ‡ National team caps and goals as of 12:06, 26 August 2018 (UTC)

Scott Anthony Martin (born 1 April 1997) is a Scottish footballer, who plays as a defensive midfielder for Queen's Park. Martin has previously played for Hibernian, Hamilton Academical and Partick Thistle, and on loan for Forfar Athletic and Arbroath.

== Club career ==
=== Hibernian ===
Raised in Cambuslang and a pupil at Trinity High School, Martin trained with Celtic as a young boy but was released. His mother corresponded with several professional clubs on his behalf, and he joined the youth setup at Hibernian in 2007, following a successful trial.

Having signed a professional contract with the Edinburgh side in February 2014, Martin made his first team debut for Hibs in December of the same year, and made three appearances from the bench in the 2014–15 season. He scored his first goal for the club on 1 August 2015, in a League Cup game against Montrose.

Martin moved on loan to Forfar Athletic in October 2015. On returning to his parent club for the 2016–17 season and made four league appearances as Hibernian won promotion as champions.

Early in his career, he was compared to the Scotland captain Scott Brown, due to similarities in their style of play and the fact that both players came through the Hibernian youth system.

In November 2017, Martin was loaned to a third-tier club again, this time to Arbroath. The Arbroath fans voted Martin as their young player of the year for the 2017–18 season.

=== Hamilton Academical ===
On 31 August 2018, Martin signed for Hamilton Academical on a two-year contract. On 3 August 2020, he signed a new three-year deal at Hamilton, keeping him at the club until 2023.

=== Partick Thistle ===
After spending six and a half years with Hamilton Academical, on 3 February 2025 Martin joined fellow Scottish Championship club Partick Thistle on an 18 month deal, with the option of a further year, with Thistle midfielder Scott Robinson heading the other way as part of a swap deal for the two players.

Just five games into his Thistle career, Martin suffered a knee injury in a 2–0 away win against Queens Park, which ruled him out for 12 months.

In February 2026, Martin joined fellow Scottish Championship club Queen's Park on loan until the end of the season.

=== Queen's Park ===
Following his loan spell, Martin joined Queen's Park permanently following the expiry of Partick Thistle contract.

== International career ==
Martin has played for Scotland at under-17 and under-19 international levels.

== Career statistics ==
As of 11 July 2021

Appearances and goals by club, season and competition
Club	Season	League			Scottish Cup		League Cup		Other		Total	
Club	Season	Division	App	Goals	App	Goals	App	Goals	App	Goals	App	Goals
Hibernian	2014–15	Scottish Championship	3	0	0	0	0	0	—		3	0
Hibernian	2015–16	Scottish Championship	2	0	0	0	1	1	1 (Note: Appearances in the Scottish Challenge Cup)	0	4	1
Hibernian	2016–17	Scottish Championship	4	0	0	0	0	0	1	0	5	0
Hibernian	2017–18	Scottish Premiership	0	0	0	0	2	0	0	0	2	0
Hibernian	2018–19	Scottish Premiership	0	0	0	0	1	0	—		1	0
Hibernian	Total		9	0	0	0	4	1	2	0	15	1
Forfar Athletic (loan)	2015–16	Scottish League One	24	2	2	0	0	0	0	0	26	2
Hibernian Under-20s	2017–18	—							1 (Note: Matches for SPFL Development League squad in the 2017–18 Scottish Challenge Cup against senior clubs)	0	1	0
Arbroath (loan)	2017–18	Scottish League One	22	0	2	0	0	0	2 (Note: 2017–18 Scottish Championship playoff matches)	0	26	0
Hamilton Academical	2018–19	Scottish Premiership	31	0	0	0	0	0	—		31	0
Hamilton Academical	2019–20	Scottish Premiership	20	0	1	1	0	0	—		21	1
Hamilton Academical	2020–21	Scottish Premiership	24	1	1	0	2	0	—		27	1
Hamilton Academical	2021–22	Scottish Championship	33	0	0	0	0	0	0	0	0	0
Hamilton Academical	Total		75	1	2	1	2	0	0	0	79	2
Career total			130	3	6	1	6	1	5	0	147	5

== Honours ==
Hibernian

- Scottish Championship: 2016–17

Hamilton Academical

- Scottish Challenge Cup: 2022–23
