= Shaun Want =

Scottish footballer

Personal information
- Date of birth: 9 February 1997 (age 29)
- Place of birth: Rutherglen, Scotland
- Height: 1.88 m (6 ft 2 in)
- Position: Defender

Team information
- Current team: Queen of the South
- Number: 12

Youth career
- 2007–2016: Hamilton Academical

Senior career*
Years	Team	Apps	(Gls)
2016–2022	Hamilton Academical	55	(2)
2022	→ Peterhead (loan)	10	(0)
2022–2025	Larne	77	(2)
2025–2026	Ayr United	11	(0)
2026–	Queen of the South	7	(0)
- * Club domestic league appearances and goals as of 18 October 2026

Shaun Want (born 9 February 1997) is a Scottish professional footballer who plays as a defender for Scottish League One side Queen of the South.

== Career ==
Raised in the Croftfoot neighbourhood of Glasgow – reported as "in the shadow of Hampden Park" but actually about 1 mile (1.6 km) south of the national stadium – Want began his career with Hamilton Academical, joining the youth system aged 10. In June 2019 he signed a contract extension with the Accies, running until summer 2020.

On 3 August 2020, Want signed a new three-year deal at Hamilton keeping him at the club until 2023. Having been a back-up squad player for much of his early career, at that time he stated that he hoped to play more in the coming season and was happy to fill in wherever needed; however, his campaign was ended by injury in October 2020 and the club was relegated from the Scottish Premiership at its end. On the opening matchday of the following season, Want scored a late equaliser as Hamilton came back from four goals down to earn a draw against Raith Rovers in the 2021–22 Scottish Championship. A few weeks later he suffered facial injuries after a clash of heads with a teammate during a Scottish Challenge Cup tie.

He moved on loan to Peterhead in February 2022.

In July 2022 he spoke about Hamilton's use of young players.

Want left Hamilton by mutual consent in August 2022, in order to sign for Northern Irish club Larne.

On 25 August 2026, Want signed a one-year deal with Scottish League One side Queen of the South.

== Career statistics ==
As of 29 November 2024

Appearances and goals by club, season and competition
Club	Season	League			National cup		League cup		Other		Total	
Club	Season	Division	Apps	Goals	Apps	Goals	Apps	Goals	Apps	Goals	Apps	Goals
Hamilton Academical	2016–17	Scottish Premiership	2	0	0	0	0	0	0	0	2	0
Hamilton Academical	2017–18	Scottish Premiership	13	0	0	0	1	2	0	0	14	2
Hamilton Academical	2018–19	Scottish Premiership	10	0	0	0	2	0	0	0	12	0
Hamilton Academical	2019–20	Scottish Premiership	11	1	0	0	2	0	0	0	13	1
Hamilton Academical	2020–21	Scottish Premiership	11	0	0	0	0	0	0	0	11	0
Hamilton Academical	2021–22	Scottish Championship	6	1	1	0	2	0	2	0	11	1
Hamilton Academical	2022–23	Scottish Championship	2	0	0	0	3	0	0	0	5	0
Hamilton Academical	Total		55	2	1	0	10	2	2	0	68	4
Peterhead (loan)	2021–22	Scottish League One	10	0	0	0	0	0	0	0	10	0
Larne	2022–23	NIFL Premiership	32	0	4	0	0	0	0	0	36	0
Larne	2023–24	NIFL Premiership	11	0	0	0	1	0	4 (Note: 1 appearance in the Charity Shield, 2 appearances in the UEFA Champions League, 1 appearance in the UEFA Conference League)	0	16	0
Larne	2024–25	NIFL Premiership	11	0	0	0	1	0	8 (Note: Appearances in the UEFA Conference League)	0	20	0
Larne	Total		54	0	4	0	2	0	12	0	72	0
Career total			119	2	5	0	12	2	14	0	150	4

== Honours ==
Larne

- NIFL Premiership (2): 2022-23, 2023-24
- County Antrim Shield: 2022-23, 2023-24
