= Scott McMann =

Scottish footballer

Personal information
- Date of birth: 9 July 1996 (age 30)
- Place of birth: Kirkintilloch, Scotland
- Height: 1.83 m (6 ft 0 in)
- Position: Defender

Team information
- Current team: Ayr United
- Number: 33

Youth career
- 2005–2008: Rossvale
- 2008–2013: Hamilton Academical

Senior career*
Years	Team	Apps	(Gls)
2013–2021	Hamilton Academical	154	(1)
2016	→ Clyde (loan)	7	(0)
2021–2024	Dundee United	94	(2)
2024–	Ayr United	67	(2)

International career
2012	Scotland U16	1	(0)
2012	Scotland U17	1	(0)
- * Club domestic league appearances and goals as of 4 May 2026

Scott Cameron McMann (born 9 July 1996) is a Scottish professional footballer who plays as a defender for Scottish Championship club Ayr United.

== Club career ==
Raised in Torrance, East Dunbartonshire, McMann turned professional with Hamilton Academical in July 2012. He made his senior debut on 16 April 2013. In February 2016, McMann moved on loan to Scottish League Two side Clyde for the remainder of the 2015–16 season. In October 2019, he signed a new contract with Hamilton until 2022.

He signed for Dundee United on 31 August 2021.

On 16 June 2024, McMann signed for Ayr United upon his release from Dundee United.

== International career ==
He has represented Scotland at under-16 and under-17 international levels.

== Career statistics ==
As of match played 22 February 2025

Club	Season	League			Scottish Cup		League Cup		Other		Total	
Club	Season	Division	Apps	Goals	Apps	Goals	Apps	Goals	Apps	Goals	Apps	Goals
Hamilton Academical	2012–13	Scottish First Division	1	0	0	0	0	0	0	0	1	0
Hamilton Academical	2013–14	Scottish Championship	0	0	0	0	0	0	0	0	0	0
Hamilton Academical	2014–15	Scottish Premiership	1	0	0	0	0	0	0	0	1	0
Hamilton Academical	2015–16	Scottish Premiership	0	0	0	0	0	0	0	0	0	0
Hamilton Academical	2016–17	Scottish Premiership	23	0	4	0	2	0	2	0	31	0
Hamilton Academical	2017–18	Scottish Premiership	34	0	1	0	4	0	0	0	39	0
Hamilton Academical	2018–19	Scottish Premiership	28	0	1	0	4	0	0	0	33	0
Hamilton Academical	2019–20	Scottish Premiership	27	0	2	1	5	1	0	0	34	2
Hamilton Academical	2020–21	Scottish Premiership	36	1	1	0	3	1	0	0	40	2
Hamilton Academical	2021–22	Scottish Championship	4	0	0	0	0	0	0	0	4	0
Hamilton Academical	Total		154	1	9	1	18	2	2	0	183	4
Clyde (loan)	2015–16	Scottish League Two	7	0	0	0	0	0	0	0	7	0
Dundee United	2021–22	Scottish Premiership	29	0	0	0	1	0	0	0	30	0
Dundee United	2022–23	Scottish Premiership	30	0	1	0	1	0	1 (Note: Appearance in UEFA Conference League)	0	33	0
Dundee United	2023–24	Scottish Championship	35	2	1	0	4	0	3	0	43	2
Dundee United	Total		94	2	2	0	6	0	4	0	106	2
Ayr United	2024–25	Scottish Championship	20	1	3	0	4	0	1 (Note: Appearance in the Scottish League Challenge Cup)	0	28	1
Career Total			275	4	14	1	28	2	7	0	324	7
