= David Moyo =

Zimbabwean footballer (born 1994)

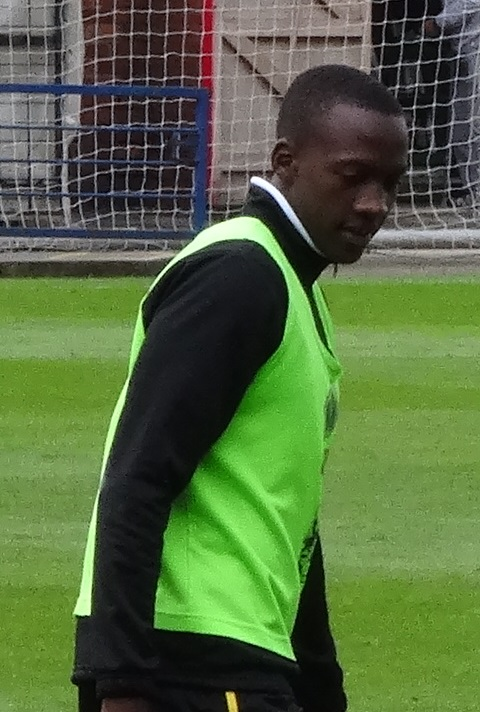
- Moyo warming up with Northampton Town in 2014

Personal information
- Full name: David Philani Moyo
- Date of birth: 17 December 1994 (age 31)
- Place of birth: Bulawayo, Zimbabwe
- Height: 6 ft 0 in (1.83 m)
- Position: Winger

Team information
- Current team: Alfreton Town

Youth career
- 2011–2012: Northampton Town

Senior career*
Years	Team	Apps	(Gls)
2012–2015	Northampton Town	14	(1)
2012	→ Kettering Town (loan)	8	(3)
2013	→ Corby Town (loan)	5	(2)
2013–2014	→ Stamford (loan)	11	(2)
2014–2015	→ Brackley Town (loan)	6	(4)
2015–2017	Brackley Town	97	(19)
2017–2018	Hemel Hempstead Town	28	(10)
2018–2019	St Albans City	40	(13)
2019–2022	Hamilton Academical	82	(13)
2022–2023	Barrow	14	(1)
2022–2023	→ Barnet (loan)	16	(2)
2023–2024	Chorley	17	(0)
2024	→ Spennymoor Town (loan)	3	(0)
2024–2025	Alfreton Town	20	(4)
Total		361	(74)

International career^{‡}
2014–2021	Zimbabwe	5	(0)
- * Club domestic league appearances and goals as of 15:45, 8 October 2026 (UTC) ‡ National team caps and goals as of 15:45, 8 October 2026 (UTC)

David Philani Moyo (born 17 December 1994) is a Zimbabwean professional footballer who plays predominately as a winger for Alfreton Town and the Zimbabwe national team.

== Club career ==
Moyo started a two-year scholarship with Northampton Town in the summer of 2011 after joining from AFC Dunstable. He was in the youth team at the same time as Ivan Toney, forming a strike partnership which helped the cobblers through to the FA Youth Cup 5th round during the 2012–13 season. In October 2012, he was awarded his first squad number by manager Aidy Boothroyd, after a prolific scoring record for the youth side. He made his professional debut on 3 November 2012, in a 1–1 draw with Bradford City in the FA Cup, coming on as a substitute for Anthony Charles. In March 2013, he was offered a professional contract with Northampton Town along with Claudio Dias.

In the 2013–14 season, Moyo spent some time out on loan at Northern Premier Division side Stamford, netting 4 goals in all competitions. He left Northampton Town on 12 January after his contract was terminated by the club.

On 12 January 2015, he signed a permanent contract with Brackley Town, Playing over 100 games in all competitions overall, scoring 21 times.

=== Successful Scotland Spell ===
After playing for St Albans, in July 2019 he signed for Hamilton Academical. On 29 December 2019, he scored his first goal for the club, the winning goal as Hamilton won 2–1 away to Motherwell in the Lanarkshire derby. In March 2020 he signed a contract extension with Hamilton until 2023.

In November 2020, Moyo was called up for the Zimbabwe national team ahead of the African Cup of Nations qualifiers.

In the 2021/22 season, Moyo provided the highest amount of assists in the Scottish Championship, tallying a total of 12. However, On 30 May 2022, Hamilton confirmed that they and Moyo had reached an agreement to release him from his contract after 93 appearances in all competitions across 3 seasons.

=== Further Career ===
On 8 August 2022, Moyo signed for Barrow on a one-year deal. On 29 December, he joined Barnet on loan until the end of the season, tallying a total of 7 assists and 1 goal in 16 appearances. He was released by Barrow after one season with the club.

On 12 September 2023, Moyo joined Chorley on a deal until the end of the season.

After a short emergency loan spell to Spennymoor Town at the end of the 2023/24 season, Moyo signed for fellow National League North side Alfreton Town on a 2 year deal in November 2024. He scored on his first appearance for the club, 13 minutes into his debut against King's Lynn Town. Moyo was not retained by Alfreton after the expiration of his contract, in summer 2025.

== International career ==
In October 2014, Moyo received his first call up to the Zimbabwe national football team.

His second call-up came whilst in fine form for Hamilton Academical in 2021, securing himself a place in their 2021 Africa Cup of Nations squad.

== Career statistics ==
=== Club ===
As of match played 29 April 2023

Appearances and goals by club, season and competition
Club	Season	League			National cup		League cup		Other		Total	
Club	Season	Division	Apps	Goals	Apps	Goals	Apps	Goals	Apps	Goals	Apps	Goals
Northampton Town	2012–13	League Two	5	0	1	0	0	0	0	0	6	0
Northampton Town	2013–14	League Two	6	0	0	0	1	0	0	0	7	0
Northampton Town	2014–15	League Two	3	1	0	0	1	0	1 (Note: Appearance in the Football League Trophy)	1	5	2
Northampton Town	Total		14	1	1	0	2	0	1	1	18	2
Brackley Town (loan)	2014–15	Conference North	6	4	0	0	—		0	0	6	4
Brackley Town	2014–15	Conference North	17	3	0	0	—		0	0	17	3
Brackley Town	2015–16	National League North	42	10	3	0	—		0	0	45	10
Brackley Town	2016–17	National League North	38	6	3	0	—		6 (Note: Appearances in the FA Trophy)	2	47	9
Brackley Town	Total		97	19	6	0	0	0	6	2	109	21
Hemel Hempstead Town	2017–18	National League South	28	9	0	0	—		0	0	28	9
St Albans City	2018–19	National League South	40	13	0	0	—		0	0	40	13
Hamilton Academical	2019–20	Scottish Premiership	20	2	0	0	0	0	—		20	2
Hamilton Academical	2020–21	Scottish Premiership	33	3	1	0	2	0	—		36	3
Hamilton Academical	2021–22	Scottish Championship	29	8	1	0	4	0	3 (Note: Appearances in the Scottish Challenge Cup)	1	37	9
Hamilton Academical	Total		82	13	2	0	6	0	3	1	93	14
Barrow	2022–23	League Two	14	0	1	0	1	1	3 (Note: Appearance in the Football League Trophy)	0	19	1
Barnet (loan)	2022-23	National League	16	1	0	0	0	0	2	1	18	2
Chorley	2023-24	National League North	17	0	0	0	0	0	0	0	17	0
Alfreton Town	2024-25	National League North	20	4	0	0	0	0	0	0	1	1
Career total			361	74	10	0	9	1	15	5	380	77

=== International ===
As of match played 16 June 2023

Appearances and goals by national team and year
National team	Year	Apps	Goals
Zimbabwe	2014	1	0
Zimbabwe	2020	2	0
Zimbabwe	2021	2	0
Total		5	0
