= Aaron McGowan =

English footballer (born 1997)

Personal information
- Full name: Aaron Joseph McGowan
- Date of birth: 24 July 1997 (age 29)
- Place of birth: Maghull, England
- Height: 1.83 m (6 ft 0 in)
- Position: Defender

Team information
- Current team: Port Vale
- Number: 12

Youth career
- –2013: Morecambe

Senior career*
Years	Team	Apps	(Gls)
2013–2018	Morecambe	102	(1)
2018–2020	Hamilton Academical	57	(3)
2020–2021	Kilmarnock	18	(0)
2021–2025	Northampton Town	122	(3)
2025–2026	Tranmere Rovers	23	(0)
2026–	Port Vale	1	(0)
- * Club domestic league appearances and goals as of 08:51, 15 November 2026 (UTC)

Aaron Joseph McGowan (born 24 July 1997) is an English professional footballer who plays as a defender for EFL League Two club Port Vale.

McGowan made his professional debut for Morecambe whilst still a student at Maricourt Catholic School in April 2013. He won the club's Player of the Year award in 2018, playing 119 games in all competitions until his departure in June 2018. He joined Hamilton Academical of the Scottish Premiership, winning the club's Player of the Year awards for both the 2018–19 and 2019–20 seasons. He then spent the 2020–21 campaign with Kilmarnock before returning to England with Northampton Town in July 2021. He helped captain the club to win promotion out of League Two in 2022–23, making 131 appearances across a four-season stay. He signed with Tranmere Rovers in October 2025 and made 30 appearances throughout the 2025–26 season. He joined Port Vale in July 2026.

== Early life ==
Aaron Joseph McGowan was born in Maghull on 24 July 1997. He attended Maricourt Catholic School. He later said that he enjoyed his time there as he could spend time with friends without "worries or stress that life brings you further down the line". He captained Kirkby Boys, Sefton Boys, and Merseyside under-16s. He also represented the Great Britain Catholic Schools football team at the FISEXC games in Malta.

== Career ==
=== Morecambe ===
McGowan made his professional debut for Morecambe during the 2012–13 season, becoming the youngest player in the club's history on 20 April in a 2–0 defeat to Torquay United at the Globe Arena. He made two substitute appearances in League Two in the 2013–14 campaign, and signed a new two-year deal in May 2014. On 28 March 2015, McGowan scored his first professional career goal in a 1–1 draw at Exeter City. He featured eight times in the 2014–15 season.

McGowan was reported to be tracked by Championship clubs in November 2015 and manager Jim Bentley said he was not surprised as he had impressed playing on both the left and right side of the Shrimps defence. McGowan signed a contract extension two months later to keep him tied to the club until 2018. He faced competition for a first-team place from Laurence Wilson and Shaun Beeley, and featured 26 times across the 2015–16 campaign. He played a further 36 times in the 2016–17 season.

He played 46 games in the 2017–18 campaign, and won three club awards, picking up Player of the Year, Fans Player of the Year, and local newspaper Player of The Year. Morecambe secured their Football League status with a point on the final day at Coventry City. He turned down a new contract at the end of this season and because he subsequently joined a Scottish club, Morecambe were not entitled to any compensation.

=== Hamilton Academical ===
McGowan signed for Scottish Premiership club Hamilton Academical, managed by Martin Canning, on 25 June 2018. On 16 March 2019, he scored his first goal for the Accies to secure a 1–0 win over Heart of Midlothian and move Brian Rice's side six points clear of the relegation zone. He was named Player of the Year and Fans' Player of the Year at the end of the 2018–19 season, having scored two goals in 38 appearances. On 29 December 2019, he scored and provided an assist in a 2–1 victory over Lanarkshire derby rivals Motherwell. He featured 29 times in the 2019–20 season, most notably against Rangers at Ibrox in March, as Hamilton won 1–0. He won the club's Player of the Year award for the second year running. He then left New Douglas Park, opting not to renew his contract as he felt undervalued.

=== Kilmarnock ===
On 15 June 2020, McGowan agreed a two-year deal with Scottish Premiership club Kilmarnock following conversations with Head of Football Operations James Fowler, becoming Alex Dyer's first signing as Killie manager. However, Dyer preferred Ross Millen at right-back and McGowan requested a transfer in September, which Dyer refused to grant. He made 20 appearances in the 2020–21 campaign, his sole season at Rugby Park.

=== Northampton Town ===
On 12 July 2021, McGowan signed for League Two club Northampton Town on a two-year deal. Martin Foyle, the club's Head of Recruitment, had previously tried to sign him at Motherwell. On 15 March 2022, he scored a "stunning half-volley" in a 2–1 defeat at Stevenage, earning himself a joint-share of Northampton's Goal of the Season award. This was one of his two goals from 44 appearances in the 2021–22 campaign. He was appointed as the club's vice-captain in July 2022. He signed a new two-and-a-half year contract in January 2023. On 4 March, McGowan was sent off for violent conduct against Crawley Town, though manager Jon Brady tried to appeal the subsequent suspension as he felt the referee had fallen victim to "kidology". He made 17 league appearances as Northampton secured automatic promotion at the end of the 2022–23 season.

He had to wait until 11 November for his first league start of the 2023–24 season. Earlier in the campaign, he had played in the EFL Trophy hours after the death of his father, earning praise from Brady for his "incredible strength". He said that playing so soon after his father's death was his way of dealing with grief and loss. Brady later said McGowan needed to improve his consistency to match his strong mentality. He played 28 League One games in his first season in the third tier.

He captained the Cobblers in the second half of the 2024–25 season. He played 36 times, scoring one goal. Northampton then announced that he had rejected a new two-year contract and would be leaving the club. He cited family reasons for his departure. Manager Kevin Nolan explained that he wanted a move closer to his wife and newborn child in Liverpool. McGowan made 131 appearances in his four years at Sixfields. He returned to train at the club in October 2025 in order to maintain his fitness.

=== Tranmere Rovers ===
On 10 October 2025, McGowan joined League Two club Tranmere Rovers on a short-term contract until January 2026. Manager Andy Crosby said the club were lucky to sign an experienced defender who lived close to the club when Rovers were struggling with injuries. He picked up an assist in his first start for Rovers, a 4–1 victory over Bristol Rovers. He picked up another assist in a draw with Milton Keynes Dons and was given the fourth-highest WhoScored rating in League Two that weekend. Once his deal expired, he extended his contract until the end of the 2025–26 season. On 17 March, he spoke of his embarrassment following a 3–0 home defeat to Harrogate Town that left the club facing a relegation battle to maintain their EFL status. He left Prenton Park when his contract expired in the summer.

=== Port Vale ===
On 31 July 2026, McGowan signed a one-year deal with League Two club Port Vale, after a successful trial earlier that month. He made his first start at Vale Park on 27 October, scoring a goal and providing two assists in a 5–0 win over Manchester City U21.

== Style of play ==
McGowan is a player who plays anywhere across the defence.

== Career statistics ==
As of match played 14 November 2026

Appearances and goals by club, season and competition
Club	Season	League			National Cup (Note: Includes FA Cup, Scottish Cup)		League Cup (Note: Includes EFL Cup, Scottish League Cup)		Other		Total	
Club	Season	Division	Apps	Goals	Apps	Goals	Apps	Goals	Apps	Goals	Apps	Goals
Morecambe	2012–13	League Two	1	0	0	0	0	0	0	0	1	0
Morecambe	2013–14	League Two	2	0	0	0	0	0	0	0	2	0
Morecambe	2014–15	League Two	8	1	0	0	0	0	0	0	8	1
Morecambe	2015–16	League Two	21	0	2	0	0	0	3 (Note: Appearance(s) in the Football League Trophy / EFL Trophy)	0	26	0
Morecambe	2016–17	League Two	30	0	2	0	0	0	4	0	36	0
Morecambe	2017–18	League Two	40	0	2	0	1	0	3	0	46	0
Morecambe	Total		102	1	6	0	1	0	10	0	119	1
Hamilton Academical	2018–19	Scottish Premiership	35	2	1	0	2	0	—		38	2
Hamilton Academical	2019–20	Scottish Premiership	22	1	2	0	5	0	—		29	1
Hamilton Academical	Total		57	3	3	0	7	0	0	0	67	3
Kilmarnock	2020–21	Scottish Premiership	18	0	0	0	2	0	0	0	20	0
Northampton Town	2021–22	League Two	42	2	1	0	1	0	0	0	44	2
Northampton Town	2022–23	League Two	17	0	1	0	0	0	1	0	19	0
Northampton Town	2023–24	League One	28	0	1	0	1	0	2	0	32	0
Northampton Town	2024–25	League One	35	1	0	0	0	0	1	0	36	1
Northampton Town	Total		122	3	3	0	2	0	4	0	131	3
Tranmere Rovers	2025–26	League Two	23	0	1	0	—		1	0	25	0
Port Vale	2026–27	League Two	1	0	1	0	0	0	3	1	5	1
Career total			323	7	14	0	12	0	18	1	367	8

== Honours ==
Northampton Town

- EFL League Two third-place promotion: 2022–23

Individual

- Morecambe Player of the Year: 2017–18
- Hamilton Academical Player of the Year: 2018–19, 2019–20
