= Ryan Fulton =

Footballer (born 1996)

- Fulton in 2026

Personal information
- Full name: Ryan William Fulton
- Date of birth: 23 May 1996 (age 30)
- Place of birth: Burnley, England
- Height: 1.91 m (6 ft 3 in)
- Position: Goalkeeper

Team information
- Current team: Heart of Midlothian
- Number: 30

Youth career
- 2007–2015: Liverpool

Senior career*
| Years | Team | Apps | (Gls) |
| 2015–2017 | Liverpool | 0 | (0) |
| 2016 | → Portsmouth (loan) | 12 | (0) |
| 2016–2017 | → Chesterfield (loan) | 26 | (0) |
| 2017–2024 | Hamilton Academical | 103 | (0) |
| 2024- | Heart of Midlothian | 3 | (0) |

International career^{‡}
| 2011 | Scotland U16 | 2 | (0) |
| 2014–2015 | Scotland U19 | 6 | (0) |
| 2016–2018 | Scotland U21 | 11 | (0) |
- * Club domestic league appearances and goals as of 19 May 2025 ‡ National team caps and goals as of 4 March 2019

Ryan William Fulton (born 23 May 1996) is an English professional footballer who plays as a goalkeeper for Scottish Premiership side Heart of Midlothian. He has previously played for Hamilton Academical, as well as loan spells at Portsmouth and Chesterfield.

Born in England, he was a youth player for Liverpool and a youth international for Scotland.

== Club career ==
=== Liverpool ===
Fulton was born in Burnley, Lancashire and joined Liverpool in 2007, representing them at under-10 level and upwards. Towards the end of the 2013–14 season, he made progress into the Under-21 squad. He featured sporadically during the 2014–15 campaign but was a regular starter in the UEFA Youth League for under-19 teams.

He was first called up to the senior squad for their 2015 summer tour of Asia prior to the 2015–16 season. He was made Liverpool's third-choice keeper, behind Simon Mignolet and Ádám Bogdán, after fellow reserve shot stoppers Danny Ward and Lawrence Vigouroux were sent out on loan.

==== Loan to Portsmouth ====
In January 2016, Fulton emerged as a loan target for Portsmouth as well as Aberdeen.

On 22 January 2016, he was signed by Portsmouth on a one-month youth loan deal. He made his senior debut the following day in a 1–0 defeat to Oxford United, a game in which he saved a penalty from Liam Sercombe.

==== Loan to Chesterfield ====
On 9 July 2016, he was signed by Chesterfield on a season long loan deal for the 2016–17 season, as cover for the injured first-choice goalkeeper Tommy Lee.

=== Hamilton Academical ===
On 18 July 2017, Fulton joined Hamilton Academical initially on a two-year deal.

=== Heart of Midlothian ===
On 19 June 2024, Fulton joined Heart of Midlothian on a two-year deal after his contract with Hamilton expired.

== International career ==
Born in England, Fulton has represented Scotland at under-16, under-19 and under-21 level.

== Career statistics ==
As of 24 July 2025

Appearances and goals by club, season and competition
| Club | Season | League | | | National Cup | | League Cup | | Other | | Total | |
| Club | Season | Division | Apps | Goals | Apps | Goals | Apps | Goals | Apps | Goals | Apps | Goals |
|---|---|---|---|---|---|---|---|---|---|---|---|---|
| Liverpool | 2015–16 | Premier League | 0 | 0 | 0 | 0 | 0 | 0 | 0 | 0 | 0 | 0 |
| Liverpool | 2016–17 | Premier League | 0 | 0 | 0 | 0 | 0 | 0 | 0 | 0 | 0 | 0 |
| Liverpool | Total | | 0 | 0 | 0 | 0 | 0 | 0 | 0 | 0 | 0 | 0 |
| Portsmouth (loan) | 2015–16 | League Two | 12 | 0 | 1 | 0 | 0 | 0 | 0 | 0 | 13 | 0 |
| Chesterfield (loan) | 2016–17 | League One | 26 | 0 | 2 | 0 | 1 | 0 | 0 | 0 | 29 | 0 |
| Hamilton Academical | 2017-18 | Scottish Premiership | 6 | 0 | 0 | 0 | 1 | 0 | 0 | 0 | 7 | 0 |
| Hamilton Academical | 2018–19 | Scottish Premiership | 4 | 0 | 1 | 0 | 1 | 0 | 1 (Note: Appearance as an over-age player for Hamilton under-21s in the Scottish Challenge Cup in which age-restricted sides from the Scottish Premiership clubs compete against senior clubs) | 0 | 7 | 0 |
| Hamilton Academical | 2019–20 | Scottish Premiership | 0 | 0 | 0 | 0 | 0 | 0 | 0 | 0 | 0 | 0 |
| Hamilton Academical | 2020–21 | Scottish Premiership | 28 | 0 | 1 | 0 | 2 | 0 | 0 | 0 | 31 | 0 |
| Hamilton Academical | 2021–22 | Scottish Championship | 20 | 0 | 0 | 0 | 0 | 0 | 1 | 0 | 21 | 0 |
| Hamilton Academical | 2022–23 | Scottish Championship | 33 | 0 | 3 | 0 | 4 | 0 | 1 | 0 | 41 | 0 |
| Hamilton Academical | 2023–24 | Scottish League One | 12 | 0 | 1 | 0 | 2 | 0 | 0 | 0 | 15 | 0 |
| Heart of Midlothian | 2024–25 | Scottish Premiership | 3 | 0 | 0 | 0 | 0 | 0 | 0 | 0 | 3 | 0 |
| Heart of Midlothian | 2025–26 | Scottish Premiership | 0 | 0 | 0 | 0 | 2 | 0 | 0 | 0 | 2 | 0 |
| Career total | | | 144 | 0 | 9 | 0 | 13 | 0 | 3 | 0 | 169 | 0 |

== Honours ==
=== Hamilton Academical ===
- Scottish Challenge Cup: 2022–23
