= Marios Ogkmpoe =

Greek footballer

Personal information
- Date of birth: 10 October 1994 (age 32)
- Place of birth: Athens, Greece
- Height: 1.88 m (6 ft 2 in)
- Position: Striker

Team information
- Current team: Hellas Syros
- Number: 9

Youth career
- Nea Ionia

Senior career*
Years	Team	Apps	(Gls)
2009–2015	Nea Ionia		
2015–2016	Fostiras		
2016–2018	OFI	30	(4)
2018–2021	Hamilton Academical	65	(13)
2021–2024	AEL	58	(29)
2024	Dibba Al Fujairah	0	(0)
2024–2025	Persita Tangerang	28	(9)
2025–2026	Nejmeh	6	(1)
2026–	Hellas Syros	3	(1)
- * Club domestic league appearances and goals as of 20:00, 1 March 2026 (UTC)

Marios Ogkmpoe (Note: Also spelt Ogboe.) (Greek: Μάριος Όγκμποε; born 10 October 1994) is a Greek professional footballer who plays as a striker for Super League Greece 2 club Hellas Syros.

== Career ==
Born in Athens, Ogkmpoe began playing youth football with Nea Ionia, making his senior club debut at the age of 15, playing in the Delta and later the Gamma Ethniki, the 4th and 3rd tier of the Greek football league system respectively. In the summer of 2015 he moved to Gamma Ethniki club Fostiras, before signing for OFI on a free transfer in the summer of 2016.

After spending one-and-a-half seasons with OFI, Ogkmpoe signed a short-term deal with Scottish Premiership side Hamilton Academical on 24 January 2018, making his debut that same day, in a league match against Heart of Midlothian.

In March 2020 he signed a contract extension with Hamilton until 2021. On 19 May 2021 it was announced that he would leave Hamilton at the end of the season, following the expiry of his contract.

In July 2021 he signed for AEL. He scored his first goal on 14 November 2021 on his debut league appearance against home rivals Apollon Larissa. On 11 December 2021, he scored two goals against Apollon Pontus, and on 29 December 2021 he scored his first hat-trick against Xanthi, reaching 6 league goals by the end of 2021.

After leaving AEL in February 2024, he signed for Emirati club Dibba Al Fujairah. On 18 July 2024, Ogkmpoe signed for Indonesian club Persita Tangerang. On 6 June 2025, Ogkmpoe officially left Persita Tangerang. He joined Lebanese Premier League side Nejmeh on 1 September 2025. He joined Super League Greece 2 side Hellas Syros on 27 January 2026.

== Personal life ==
Ogkmpoe is of Nigerian heritage.

== Career statistics ==
As of match played 9 May 2025

Appearances and goals by club, season and competition
Club	Season	League			National cup		League cup		Other		Total	
Club	Season	Division	Apps	Goals	Apps	Goals	Apps	Goals	Apps	Goals	Apps	Goals
OFI	2016–17	Super League Greece 2	23	3	5	2	—		—		28	5
OFI	2017–18	Super League Greece 2	7	1	3	1	—		—		10	2
OFI	Total		30	4	8	3	0	0	0	0	38	7
Hamilton Academical	2017–18	Scottish Premiership	16	3	0	0	0	0	—		16	3
Hamilton Academical	2018–19	Scottish Premiership	6	1	0	0	0	0	—		6	1
Hamilton Academical	2019–20	Scottish Premiership	23	6	1	0	5	1	—		29	7
Hamilton Academical	2020–21	Scottish Premiership	20	3	0	0	2	1	—		22	4
Hamilton Academical	Total		65	13	1	0	7	2	0	0	73	15
AEL	2021–22	Super League Greece 2	29	14	4	3	—		—		33	17
AEL	2022–23	Super League Greece 2	16	13	2	0	—		—		18	13
AEL	2023–24	Super League Greece 2	13	2	0	0	—		—		13	2
AEL	Total		58	29	6	3	0	0	0	0	64	32
Persita Tangerang	2024–25	Liga 1	28	9	0	0	—		—		28	9
Career total			181	54	15	6	7	2	0	0	203	62
