= Johnny Hunt (footballer) =

English footballer (born 1990)

Personal information
- Full name: John Hunt
- Date of birth: 23 August 1990 (age 36)
- Place of birth: Liverpool, England
- Position: Left-back

Team information
- Current team: Bootle

Youth career
- Wrexham

Senior career*
| Years | Team | Apps | (Gls) |
| 2010–2014 | Wrexham | 98 | (13) |
| 2014–2015 | Cambridge United | 9 | (1) |
| 2014–2015 | → Wrexham (loan) | 10 | (0) |
| 2015–2017 | Chester | 84 | (3) |
| 2017–2018 | Mansfield Town | 18 | (0) |
| 2018–2019 | Stevenage | 29 | (0) |
| 2019–2020 | Hamilton Academical | 16 | (0) |
| 2020 | Kettering Town | 1 | (0) |
| 2020–2021 | Prestatyn Town | 0 | (0) |
| 2021 | Connah's Quay Nomads | 10 | (0) |
| 2022–2023 | Warrington Rylands 1906 | 43 | (1) |
| 2023– | Bootle | 2 | (0) |

International career
| 2013 | England C | 1 | (0) |
- * Club domestic league appearances and goals as of 20:27, 13 December 2023 (UTC)

John Hunt (born 23 August 1990) is an English semi-professional footballer who plays for Bootle as a left-back.

Hunt progressed through the youth academy at Wrexham before making his first-team debut towards the end of the 2009–10 season. He spent five seasons at Wrexham, during his time there he scored the winning penalty in the 2013 FA Trophy Final at Wembley Stadium. In June 2014, Hunt joined League Two club Cambridge United, although returned to Wrexham on loan one month into the 2014–15 campaign. He left the Cambridge by mutual consent in June 2015 and immediately signed for National League club Chester, where he played regularly for two years. Hunt spent the 2017–18 season at Mansfield Town, before being transfer-listed at the end of the campaign. He subsequently joined Stevenage on a free transfer in June 2018 and spent one season there before signing for Hamilton in July 2019. Hunt has also represented the England C team.

== Club career ==
=== Wrexham ===
Hunt began his career in the Wrexham youth academy. He made his first-team debut for Wrexham on 20 April 2010, starting in a 1–0 away defeat to Oxford United. Hunt played just five times over the following two seasons, finally breaking through as a first-team regular during the second half of the 2011–12 campaign. He played in the Conference Premier play-offs that season as Wrexham narrowly lost to Luton Town at the semi-final stage.

The 2012–13 season marked Hunt's first full season in the first-team at Wrexham, with his first professional goal coming in a 1–1 draw with Ebbsfleet United on 18 August 2012. Hunt scored the winning penalty as Wrexham won the FA Trophy courtesy of a 4–1 penalty shootout victory over Grimsby Town at Wembley Stadium on 24 March 2013. Hunt would return to Wembley two months later as Wrexham made the Conference Premier play-off final in May 2013, playing the full 90 minutes in a 2–0 defeat to Newport County, meaning Wrexham would remain in the Conference Premier. Later that month he signed a new contract with Wrexham. He made 49 appearances during the campaign, scoring three times.

During the 2013–14 season, Hunt played in defence, midfield and also as a striker. He received the first red card of his career for a tackle on Curtis Weston in a 1–1 draw with Barnet on 13 October 2013. He finished as the club's top goalscorer for the campaign with 12 goals in 46 appearances, ending the season playing as a striker and scoring four goals in the club's final six league matches. With his contract set to expire, Hunt turned down a new contract offer from Wrexham in June 2014, with Wrexham stating he was set to join "an unnamed League Two club".

=== Cambridge United ===
Hunt subsequently signed a two-year contract with League Two club Cambridge United on 11 June 2014. Despite being out of contract, Wrexham stated they had agreed a compensation package with Cambridge for the player as he was under the age of 23. Having not played for Cambridge a month into the 2014–15 season, Hunt returned to Wrexham on 1 September 2014, on a loan deal until January 2015. He made 14 appearances during the four-month spell, scoring once, before returning to Cambridge.

On his return to Cambridge, Hunt made his Football League debut, coming on as a second-half substitute and scoring Cambridge's first goal in a 3–2 away loss against Luton Town on 31 January 2015. Hunt struggled to cement a first-team place at Cambridge and made nine appearances for the club, scoring once. He left Cambridge when his contract was terminated by mutual consent in June 2015.

=== Chester ===
On the same day his departure from Cambridge was announced, Hunt joined National League club Chester on a free transfer. He made a goalscoring debut for Chester when he "beat two Braintree defenders before curling into the far corner" in a 1–0 home victory over Braintree Town on 8 August 2015. Hunt was a regular throughout the campaign as he made 49 appearances in all competitions, scoring three times, as Chester consolidated their place in the National League courtesy of a 17th-place finish. He signed a new one-year contract on 23 June 2016.

He kept his place as the club's first choice left-back during the 2016–17 season, playing 41 times and scoring once. During the campaign, Hunt was also sent-off twice within the space of four appearances, consequently missing six matches through suspension at the start of 2017. Hunt and Chester held "initial talks" over a new contract in January 2017. Despite talks continuing in March that year, no deal was agreed, and Chester decided against offering Hunt a new contract. He left the club upon the expiry of his contract in May 2017. Hunt stated his surprise at not being offered a new contract and added he "would've signed a contract there and then" had it been offered. He made 90 appearances for the club over his two seasons there.

=== Mansfield Town ===
Following his departure from Chester, Hunt signed for League Two club Mansfield Town on a free transfer on 23 May 2017. He made his Mansfield debut three weeks into the new campaign, playing the whole match in a 3–1 loss to Lincoln City in the EFL Trophy. Hunt was originally second choice left-back to Mal Benning at the start of the season, but cemented his place a first-team regular from September through to December 2017, with Mansfield manager Steve Evans stating Hunt was "in front of Benning by a nose". Following a change of management, Hunt made just three appearances during the second half of the season. He was subsequently transfer-listed upon the conclusion of the 2017–18 season on 10 May 2018. New Mansfield manager David Flitcroft stated Hunt had asked to be guaranteed first-team football, which he could not do, and that Hunt's position in the squad could also prevent the progress of youth graduate left-back Henri Wilder. Hunt made 21 appearances during his one season at Mansfield.

=== Stevenage ===
Hunt signed for fellow League Two club Stevenage on 26 June 2018, joining the club on a free transfer. He made his Stevenage debut in the club's opening match of the 2018–19 season, a 2–2 draw with Tranmere Rovers at Broadhall Way, in which he was sent-off for two bookable offences. Hunt made 33 appearances during the season as Stevenage finished in tenth position in League Two, one point off of the play-off places. He was released by Stevenage at the end of the season.

=== Hamilton Academical ===
Hunt signed for Scottish Premiership club Hamilton Academical on 1 July 2019.

=== Kettering Town ===
On 29 October 2020, Hunt joined National League North side Kettering Town. On 14 November 2020, it was announced that Hunt had left the club after having played just one game for the Poppies.

=== Prestatyn Town ===
On 20 December 2020, Hunt signed for Cymru North side Prestatyn Town. He left the club without making an appearance due to the suspension of football in Wales below elite level due to the impact of the ongoing Coronavirus pandemic.

=== Connahs Quay Nomads ===
The following month, he signed for Connah's Quay Nomads. He left the club at the end of the season.

=== Warrington Rylands 1906 ===
In January 2022 he signed for Warrington Rylands 1906.

=== Bootle ===
In May 2023 he signed for Bootle.

== International career ==
Hunt was called up to represent the England C team, who represent England at non-league level, on 29 May 2013, having initially been on manager Paul Fairclough's stand-by list. He made his England C debut when he played the full 90 minutes in a 6–1 victory over Bermuda on 4 June 2013 in Hamilton.

== Style of play ==
Hunt predominantly plays at left-back. During the 2013–14 campaign, he was described as a utility player having been deployed at left-back, central midfield and also as a striker. When Hunt was used as a striker during the season, finishing as the club's top goalscorer, he stated he spent time adapting his game; working on making runs into the box, as well as practising his finishing. From the following season on, Hunt has been deployed solely at left-back.

== Career statistics ==
As of match played 9 April 2024

| Club | Season | League | | | National Cup | | League Cup | | Other | | Total | |
| Club | Season | Division | Apps | Goals | Apps | Goals | Apps | Goals | Apps | Goals | Apps | Goals |
|---|---|---|---|---|---|---|---|---|---|---|---|---|
| Wrexham | 2009–10 | Conference Premier | 1 | 0 | 0 | 0 | — | | 0 | 0 | 1 | 0 |
| Wrexham | 2010–11 | Conference Premier | 3 | 0 | 0 | 0 | — | | 2 (Note: Appearance(s) in FA Trophy) | 0 | 5 | 0 |
| Wrexham | 2011–12 | Conference Premier | 13 | 0 | 4 | 0 | — | | 2 (Note: One appearance in FA Trophy, one appearance in Conference Premier play-offs) | 0 | 19 | 0 |
| Wrexham | 2012–13 | Conference Premier | 39 | 2 | 2 | 0 | — | | 8 (Note: Five appearances and one goal in FA Trophy, three appearances in Conference Premier play-offs) | 1 | 49 | 3 |
| Wrexham | 2013–14 | Conference Premier | 42 | 11 | 2 | 0 | — | | 2 | 1 | 46 | 12 |
| Wrexham | Total | | 98 | 13 | 8 | 0 | 0 | 0 | 14 | 2 | 120 | 15 |
| Cambridge United | 2014–15 | League Two | 9 | 1 | — | | 0 | 0 | 0 | 0 | 9 | 1 |
| Wrexham (loan) | 2014–15 | Conference Premier | 10 | 0 | 4 | 1 | — | | 0 | 0 | 14 | 1 |
| Chester | 2015–16 | National League | 44 | 2 | 1 | 0 | — | | 4 (Note: Three appearances and one goal in FA Trophy, one appearance in Cheshire Senior Cup) | 1 | 49 | 3 |
| Chester | 2016–17 | National League | 40 | 1 | 1 | 0 | — | | 1 | 0 | 42 | 1 |
| Chester | Total | | 84 | 3 | 2 | 0 | 0 | 0 | 5 | 1 | 91 | 4 |
| Mansfield Town | 2017–18 | League Two | 18 | 0 | 1 | 0 | 0 | 0 | 2 (Note: Appearance(s) in EFL Trophy) | 0 | 21 | 0 |
| Stevenage | 2018–19 | League Two | 29 | 0 | 1 | 0 | 1 | 0 | 2 (Note: Appearance in the EFL Trophy) | 0 | 33 | 0 |
| Hamilton Academical | 2019–20 | Scottish Premiership | 16 | 0 | 1 | 0 | 1 | 0 | 0 | 0 | 18 | 0 |
| Kettering Town | 2020–21 | National League North | 1 | 0 | 0 | 0 | — | | 0 | 0 | 1 | 0 |
| Prestatyn Town | 2020–21 | Cymru North | 0 | 0 | 0 | 0 | 0 | 0 | 0 | 0 | 0 | 0 |
| Connah's Quay Nomads | 2020–21 | Cymru Premier | 10 | 0 | 0 | 0 | 0 | 0 | 0 | 0 | 10 | 0 |
| Warrington Rylands 1906 | 2021–22 | NPL Division One West | 11 | 1 | 0 | 0 | — | | 0 | 0 | 11 | 0 |
| Warrington Rylands 1906 | 2022–23 | NPL Premier Division | 26 | 0 | 1 | 0 | — | | 2 | 0 | 29 | 0 |
| Warrington Rylands 1906 | Total | | 37 | 1 | 1 | 0 | 0 | 0 | 2 | 0 | 40 | 4 |
| Bootle | 2023–24 | NPL Division One West | 2 | 0 | 1 | 0 | — | | 0 | 0 | 3 | 0 |
| Career Total | | | 314 | 18 | 19 | 1 | 2 | 0 | 25 | 3 | 360 | 22 |

== Honours ==
Wrexham

- FA Trophy: 2012–13
