= Ben Stirling =

Scottish footballer

Personal information
- Date of birth: 16 August 1998 (age 28)
- Place of birth: Edinburgh, Scotland
- Height: 1.85 m (6 ft 1 in)
- Positions: Defensive midfielder; centre-back

Team information
- Current team: Musselburgh Athletic

Senior career*
| Years | Team | Apps | (Gls) |
| 2016–2020 | Hibernian | 0 | (0) |
| 2016–2017 | → Berwick Rangers (loan) | 11 | (0) |
| 2017–2018 | → Cowdenbeath (loan) | 7 | (1) |
| 2019 | → Arbroath (loan) | 6 | (0) |
| 2020 | → Alloa Athletic (loan) | 7 | (0) |
| 2020–2022 | Hamilton Academical | 24 | (0) |
| 2022 | → Edinburgh City (loan) | 17 | (0) |
| 2022–2024 | Edinburgh City | 24 | (0) |
| 2024 | Stenhousemuir | 6 | (0) |
| 2024–2025 | Tranent Juniors | 30 | (1) |
| 2025– | Musselburgh Athletic | 12 | (1) |

International career
| 2013 | Scotland U16 | 3 | (0) |
- * Club domestic league appearances and goals as of 08:39, 29 March 2026 (UTC)

Ben Stirling (born 16 August 1998) is a Scottish professional footballer who plays as a defensive midfielder or centre-back for Musselburgh Athletic.

== Club career ==
Stirling began his career with Hibernian, moving on loan to Berwick Rangers in July 2016. He moved on loan to Cowdenbeath in August 2017, but the loan was cut short in January 2018 after he was recalled by Hibernian manager Neil Lennon. He spent further loans spells at Arbroath in September 2019, and Alloa Athletic in January 2020.

He moved to Hamilton Academical in September 2020. On 14 January 2022, Stirling joined Scottish League Two side Edinburgh City on loan for the remainder of the 2021–22 season.

He was released by Hamilton at the end of his contract in May 2022. Stirling then signed with Edinburgh City again, this time permanently. However, he missed a big part of the 2022–23 season due to injuries. In January 2024 he signed for Stenhousemuir, and later played for Tranent Juniors, and Musselburgh Athletic.

== International career ==
Stirling made three appearances for Scotland at under-16 level in 2013.
