= Kyle Munro =

Scottish footballer

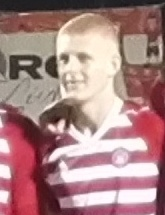
- Munro with Hamilton U19s, 2018

Personal information
- Date of birth: 29 November 2001 (age 24)
- Place of birth: Glasgow, Scotland
- Positions: Defender; winger

Youth career
- Hamilton Academical

Senior career*
Years	Team	Apps	(Gls)
2019–2022	Hamilton Academical	22	(2)
2019–2020	→ Clydebank (loan)	26	(2)
2022	→ Clydebank (loan)	10	(0)
2022–2023	East Kilbride		
- * Club domestic league appearances and goals as of 19:33, 15 May 2022 (UTC)

Kyle Munro (born 29 November 2001) is a Scottish professional footballer who used to play for East Kilbride, as a defender and winger.

== Career ==
Munro began his career with Hamilton Academical, spending time on loan with Clydebank in 2019. He made his debut for Hamilton on 29 August 2020, in a 0–2 home defeat against Rangers. He made his first start on 12 September 2020 against Livingston, scoring the winning goal. He returned on loan to Clydebank in February 2022.

In June 2022 he signed for East Kilbride.
