= Kyle Gourlay =

Scottish footballer (born 1998)

Personal information
- Date of birth: 24 September 1998 (age 28)
- Place of birth: Dundee, Scotland
- Height: 6 ft 0 in (1.83 m)
- Position: Goalkeeper

Team information
- Current team: Kelty Hearts
- Number: 46

Youth career
- –2017: Dundee

Senior career*
Years	Team	Apps	(Gls)
2017–2019	Dundee	0	(0)
2017	→ Clyde (loan)	6	(0)
2017	→ Airdrieonians (loan)	3	(0)
2018	→ Clyde (loan)	3	(0)
2018–2019	→ Elgin City (loan)	34	(0)
2019–2021	Hamilton Academical	10	(0)
2021–2023	Cove Rangers	22	(0)
2023–2024	Kelty Hearts	36	(0)
2025–	Kelty Hearts	23	(0)
- * Club domestic league appearances and goals as of 4 May 2026

Kyle Gourlay (born 24 September 1998) is a Scottish professional footballer who plays as a goalkeeper for Kelty Hearts.

He started his career at Dundee and had loan spells at Clyde, Airdrieonians and Elgin City before signing for Hamilton Academical in summer 2019 after being released by Dundee. Gourlay signed a two-year deal at Cove Rangers in June 2021, and then joined Kelty Hearts.

== Career ==
=== Dundee ===
Born in Dundee, Gourlay spent his early career with Dundee, signing his first contract with the club in summer 2014. Gourlay appeared for the Dundee under-20 side in a 2–1 defeat against Cove Rangers in the Scottish Challenge Cup. In March 2017, he joined Scottish League Two club Clyde on a development loan until the end of the season. He made his senior debut on 1 April in a 1–0 defeat away to Cowdenbeath. He appeared in 6 league matches for Clyde, and signed a new contract with Dundee in May 2017.

On 19 October 2017, he joined Scottish League One club Airdrieonians on an emergency loan until January 2018. He made his debut for Airdrieonians on 28 October 2017 in a 2–2 draw at home to Albion Rovers and made a further two appearances for them. In January 2018, Gourlay returned to Clyde on loan for the remainder of the season. He played three times for Clyde and signed a one-year contract extension in May 2018.

In summer 2018, Gourlay joined Scottish League Two side Elgin City on loan until January 2019. He made his debut against Ross County in the Scottish League Cup in July 2018, before making his league debut the following month. In January 2019, his loan was extended until the end of the season, having already played 20 times for Elgin City. He made a total of 38 appearances. He was released by Dundee at the end of the 2018–19 season.

=== Hamilton Academical ===
Having had trials with Queen of the South and AFC Bournemouth, he signed a one-year contract with Hamilton Academical in July 2019. In May 2020 he signed a one-year extension to his contract. Gourlay made his first competitive appearance for Hamilton in a 3–2 defeat at Hibernian on 2 October, after regular goalkeeper Ryan Fulton was ruled out due to COVID-19. On 19 May 2021 it was announced that he would leave Hamilton at the end of the season, following the expiry of his contract.

=== Cove Rangers ===
He signed for Cove Rangers in June 2021 on a two-year deal.

=== Kelty Hearts ===
In May 2023 following the completion of his contract with Cove, Gourlay signed with Scottish League One club Kelty Hearts. He signed a new two-year contract in March 2024, but on 3 July 2024, Kelty confirmed that Gourlay had left the club after accepting an offshore job which made him unable to continue with the club. He re-joined the club in November 2025.
