= 2025 Scottish Challenge Cup final =

- Event: 2024–25 Scottish Challenge Cup
| Queen's Park | Livingston |
| 0 | 5 |
- Date: 30 March 2025
- Venue: Falkirk Stadium, Falkirk
- Attendance: 4,079
- Weather: Sunny

The 2025 Scottish Challenge Cup final, also known as the SPFL Trust Trophy final for sponsorship reasons, was a football match played on 30 March 2025 between Scottish Championship sides, Livingston and Queen's Park. It was the 32nd final of the Scottish Challenge Cup since it was first organised in 1990 to celebrate the centenary of the now defunct Scottish Football League, and the tenth since the SPFL was formed. It was played at Falkirk Stadium. Livingston won decisively 5–0.

== Route to the final ==
=== Livingston ===
As a 2024–25 Championship club, Livingston received a bye to the third round. The 2025 final was their first Challenge Cup final since 2015, in which they beat Alloa Athletic, and their third overall. Livingston started the tournament away to League Two side, The Spartans, before playing 4-time champions, Inverness Caledonian Thistle from League One, in the Fourth round at home, where despite a shaky second half, held them out on penalties. In the Quarter finals, Livingston drew Greenock Morton who they comfortably beat 2–1 despite a last gasp goal from Austin Samuels for Morton. In the Semi-finals, Livingston were drawn away to Dunfermline Athletic, who they beat 2–0 to progress into the final.

| Round | Opposition | Score |
|---|---|---|
| Third round | The Spartans (a) | 2–0 |
| Fourth round | Inverness Caledonian Thistle (h) | 2–2 (aet) 5–4 (p) |
| Quarter-final | Greenock Morton (h) | 2–1 |
| Semi-final | Dunfermline Athletic (a) | 2–0 |

=== Queen's Park ===
Like Livingston, Queen's Park received a bye to the third round. The 2025 final was their first Challenge Cup Final, and their first major cup final in 125 years, the 1899–1900 Scottish Cup final where they lost to Celtic. Queen's Park started their tournament against Edinburgh City from League Two, beating them 1–0, before being drawn away to the borders and League One Annan Athletic who they comfortably dispatched 4–1, before heading back to Lesser Hampden to beat a 10-man Rangers B side, 3–1, in the Quarter-final. In the semis, however, Queen's Park were dragged into extra time after Lowland League side, East Kilbride, held them to a 2–2 draw after 90 minutes, before Queen's Park slotted 4 goals past them without reply to win 6–2 and advance to the final.

| Round | Opposition | Score |
|---|---|---|
| Third round | Edinburgh City (h) | 1–0 |
| Fourth round | Annan Athletic (a) | 4–1 |
| Quarter-final | Rangers B (h) | 3–1 |
| Semi-final | East Kilbride (h) | 6–2 (aet) |

== Match details ==
30 March 2025
16:10 GMT
Final

| Queen's Park | 0–5 | Livingston |
|---|---|---|
| | Report | McGowan 26'; May 45'; Yengi 50'; Shinnie 82'; Brandon 90+1' |

Falkirk Stadium, Falkirk
Attendance: 4,079
Referee: Calum Scott

| Queen's Park | Livingston |

| GK | 1 | (England) Calum Ferrie (c) |
| RB | 2 | (Scotland) Zach Mauchin |
| CB | 12 | (England) Ben Jackson |
| CB | 15 | (England) Will Tizzard (substituted off) 31' |
| LB | 33 | (Scotland) Adam Montgomery |
| CM | 4 | (Scotland) Sean Welsh |
| CM | 7 | (Scotland) Louis Longridge (substituted off) 56' |
| RW | 28 | (England) Seb Drozd (substituted off) 56' |
| CAM | 14 | (Scotland) Roddy MacGregor |
| RW | 11 | (England) Kyle Hurst (substituted off) 56' |
| FW | 17 | (Scotland) Zak Rudden |
Substitutes:
| GK | 21 | (Scotland) Jack Willis |
| DF | 45 | (Scotland) Darryl Carrick (substituted on) 31' (substituted off) 48' |
| MF | 20 | (England) Jack Turner (substituted on) 56' |
| MF | 22 | (Wales) Jadan Raymond |
| MF | 23 | (Scotland) Ryan Duncan (substituted on) 48' |
| FW | 29 | (Northern Ireland) Reece Evans (substituted on) 56' |
| FW | 37 | (Scotland) Rocco Hickey-Fugaccia (substituted on) 56' |
| FW | 39 | (Scotland) Timam Scott |
| FW | 46 | (Scotland) Aiden McGinlay |
Manager:
(Scotland) Steven MacLean

| GK | 28 | (France) Jérôme Prior |
| RB | 12 | (Scotland) Jamie Brandon (c) |
| CB | 5 | (Australia) Ryan McGowan |
| CB | 27 | (Scotland) Danny Wilson |
| LB | 26 | (Colombia) Cristian Montaño (substituted off) 62' |
| CM | 8 | (Scotland) Scott Pittman |
| CM | 10 | (Scotland) Stephen Kelly |
| CM | 25 | (Scotland) Macaulay Tait (substituted off) 62' |
| RW | 23 | (Scotland) Robbie Muirhead (substituted off) 76' |
| ST | 17 | (Scotland) Stevie May (substituted off) 75' |
| LW | 9 | (Australia) Tete Yengi (substituted off) 83' |
Substitutes:
| GK | 14 | (Scotland) Jack Hamilton |
| DF | 3 | (Northern Ireland) Matthew Clarke (substituted on) 62' |
| DF | 19 | (Northern Ireland) Daniel Finlayson (substituted on) 83' |
| DF | 21 | (Saint Kitts and Nevis) Michael Nottingham |
| MF | 6 | (Scotland) Reece McAlear (substituted on) 62' |
| MF | 7 | (England) Liam Sole |
| MF | 15 | (Scotland) Lewis Smith (substituted on) 76' |
| MF | 22 | (Scotland) Andrew Shinnie (substituted on) 75' |
| FW | 40 | (Nigeria) Samson Lawal |
Manager:
(Scotland) David Martindale

Match rules

- 90 minutes.
- 30 minutes of extra-time if necessary.
- Penalty shoot-out if scores still level.
