= 1996 Scottish Challenge Cup final =

Football match

- Event: 1996–97 Scottish Challenge Cup
Stranraer	St Johnstone
1	0
- Date: 3 November 1996
- Venue: Broadwood Stadium, Cumbernauld
- Referee: K. W. Clark (Paisley)
- Attendance: 5,522

The 1996 Scottish Challenge Cup final was an association football match between Stranraer and St Johnstone on 3 November 1996 at Broadwood Stadium in Cumbernauld. It was the seventh final of the Scottish Challenge Cup since it was first organised in 1990 to celebrate the centenary of the Scottish Football League.

The match was Stranraer's first national cup final in its 126-year history, whilst it was St Johnstone's first in 27 years since losing the Scottish League Cup Final in October 1969. The tournament was contested by clubs below the Scottish Premier Division, with St Johnstone from the First Division and Stranraer from the Second Division. The only goal of the game was from Tommy Sloan, which was enough for Stranraer to win the match 1–0.

== Route to the final ==
=== Stranraer ===
Round	Opposition	Score
First round	Berwick Rangers (a)	2–0
Second round	Clyde (h)	2–1
Quarter-final	East Fife (a)	1–0
Semi-final	Greenock Morton (h)	3–0

Stranraer faced Berwick Rangers away from home at Shielfield Park, producing a 2–0 win and clean sheet. The second round draw saw Clyde travel to Stair Park with the home team winning 2–1. The reward for reaching the quarter-final was an away game against East Fife in Methil with Stranraer edging out the opposition in a 1–0 victory and second clean sheet of the tournament to progress to the semi-finals. The opposition was a home game against Greenock Morton, and Stranraer produced a third clean sheet in a 3–0 win against the club, sending The Blues into their first ever Scottish Challenge Cup final.

=== St. Johnstone ===
Round	Opposition	Score
First round	Albion Rovers (a)	2–1
Second round	Ayr United (a)	3–0
Quarter-final	Dundee (a)	5–1
Semi-final	Montrose (h)	4–2

St Johnstone faced a trip to Albion Rovers' home of Cliftonhill in Coatbridge in the first round which saw the team emerge 2–1 winners. The second round was another game on the road against Ayr United for St Johnstone with the visitors producing a 3–0 victory to progress to the quarter-finals. A trip to Tayside neighbours Dundee was the reward for reaching the quarter-finals with The Saints triumphing 5–1 winners. The semi-final draw paired the club with Montrose and St Johnstone's only home game of the tournament with the club winning 4–2 at McDiarmid Park. St Johnstone reached the Scottish Challenge Cup final for the first time.

== Pre-match ==
=== Analysis ===
Stranraer had played two home games and two away games in the matches preceding the final, whereas, St Johnstone played only one game at their home of McDiarmid Park and played the other three games away from home. Stranraer scored a total of eight goal and conceded only one goal before the final, in the process keeping three clean sheets. St Johnstone amassed a total of fourteen goals scored and conceded only four, but kept only one clean sheet. This was the first appearance for both Stranraer and St Johnstone in the Scottish Challenge Cup final since its inauguration in 1990.

== Final ==
3 November 1996
15:00 GMT

Stranraer	1–0	St Johnstone
Griffin (o.g.)	Report

Broadwood Stadium, Cumbernauld
Attendance: 5,522
Referee: Kenny Clark

=== Teams ===
Stranraer:
GK	1	(Scotland) Barney Duffy
MF	2	(Scotland) Graham Duncan
DF	3	(Scotland) Tom Black	Substituted off
DF	4	(Scotland) Jim Hughes
DF	5	(Scotland) Tony Gallagher	Substituted off
DF	6	(Scotland) John McCaffrey
FW	7	(Scotland) Tommy Sloan
MF	8	(Scotland) Alan Lansdowne
FW	9	(Scotland) Gordon Young	Substituted off
MF	10	(Scotland) Ian McAuley
MF	11	(Scotland) Robert Docherty
Substitutes:
DF	12	(Scotland) Derek Crawford	Substituted in
FW	14	(Scotland) John McMillan	Substituted in
DF	15	(Scotland) John Robertson	Substituted in
Manager:
(Scotland) Campbell Money

St Johnstone:
GK	1	(Scotland) Alan Main
DF	2	(Scotland) John McQuillan
DF	3	(Scotland) Allan Preston
MF	4	(Austria) Attila Sekerlioglu	Substituted off
DF	5	(Scotland) Jim Weir
DF	6	(Northern Ireland) Danny Griffin
MF	7	(Scotland) Steve Tosh
MF	8	(Scotland) John O'Neil
FW	9	(Scotland) Roddy Grant
FW	10	(Scotland) Ian Ferguson	Substituted off
MF	11	(Wales) Leigh Jenkinson
Substitutes:
DF	12	(Scotland) Andy Whiteford
MF	14	(Scotland) Gary Farquhar	Substituted in
FW	15	(Sweden) Peter Fyhr	Substituted in
Manager:
(Scotland) Paul Sturrock
