= 2026 Scottish Challenge Cup final =

- Event: 2025–26 Scottish Challenge Cup
Raith Rovers	Inverness Caledonian Thistle
4	1
- Date: 5 April 2026
- Venue: Firhill Stadium, Glasgow
- Man of the Match: Innes Cameron
- Referee: Ryan Lee
- Attendance: 4,812

The 2026 Scottish Challenge Cup final, also known as the KDM Evolution Trophy final for sponsorship reasons, was the final match of the 2025–26 Scottish Challenge Cup. It was contested between Scottish Championship side Raith Rovers and Scottish League One side Inverness Caledonian Thistle. It was the 33rd final of the Scottish Challenge Cup since it was first organised in 1990 to celebrate the centenary of the now defunct Scottish Football League, and the eleventh since the SPFL was formed. The final was played at Firhill Stadium on Easter Sunday. This match was a repeat of the scheduled 2020 Scottish Challenge Cup final which was cancelled due to the coronavirus pandemic which resulted in the trophy being shared by the two teams. With both sides having won three trophies each previously, the winners of the final joined Falkirk as the joint record title winners.

The match was televised live on BBC Alba.

== Route to the final ==
=== Raith Rovers ===
Round	Opposition	Score
Second round	Hamilton Academical (h)	5–2
Third round	Queen of the South (h)	1–0
Quarter-final	Queen's Park (a)	1–1 (aet) 3–1 (p)
Semi-final	Airdrieonians (a)	1–1 (aet) 5–3 (p)

=== Inverness Caledonian Thistle ===
Round	Opposition	Score
League Phase	Elgin City (a)	4–1
League Phase	Aberdeen B (h)	4–1
League Phase	Stirling Albion (h)	2–1
League Phase	Dundee B (h)	6–0
League Phase	Forfar Athletic (a)	4–1
League Phase	Dundee United B (h)	6–0
Second round	Dumbarton (a)	9–0
Third round	Partick Thistle (a)	3–3 4–2 (p)
Quarter Finals	Stenhousemuir (h)	1–0
Semi Finals	Ayr United (a)	2–1

== Match ==
5 April 2026
16:10

Raith Rovers	4–1	Inverness Caledonian Thistle
Cameron 29', 55'; Easton 60', 69'		Stewart 37'

Firhill Stadium, Glasgow
Attendance: 4,812
Referee: Ryan Lee
