= 2024–25 Queen's Park F.C. season =

Queen's Park
2024–25 season
- President: Graeme Shields
- Manager: Callum Davidson (until 15 March); Steven MacLean (interim)
- Stadium: Hampden Park
- Scottish Championship: Eighth place
- Scottish Cup: Quarter-finals
- League Cup: Second round
- Challenge Cup: Runners-up
- Glasgow Cup: Group stage
- Top goalscorer: League: Zak Rudden (9); All: Zak Rudden (15)
- Highest home attendance: 2,609 vs. Raith Rovers, Championship, 2 May 2025
- Lowest home attendance: 478 vs. Elgin City, League Cup, 23 July 2024
- Average home league attendance: 1,568
Home colours	Away colours	Third colours

The 2024–25 season was Queen's Park's third season in the Scottish Championship following their promotion from League One at the end of the 2021–22 season. Queen's also competed in the Scottish Cup, League Cup, Challenge Cup and the Glasgow Cup.

== Summary ==
On 26 May, Queen's announced that they would continue to play matches at Hampden Park for the forthcoming season, while utilising Lesser Hampden for League Cup fixtures.

Darren O'Donnell was announced as the club's new director of football on 31 May.

On 9 February 2025, Queen's Park defeated Rangers 1–0 at Ibrox Stadium in the fifth round of the Scottish Cup. A result that was later described as "One of the greatest shocks in Scottish football history".

On 15 March, Callum Davidson was sacked following a 4–0 home defeat to Falkirk. His assistant Steven MacLean would take over in an interim basis until the end of the season.

== Results and fixtures ==
Win Draw Loss Postponed

=== Pre-season and friendlies ===
2 July 2024	East Fife	0–0	Queen's Park	Methil
19:30		Report		Stadium: Bayview Stadium

10 July 2024	Queen's Park	4–6	Celtic	Glasgow
19:45	Paton 15'; Thomas 22'; Longridge 70'; McDonnell 85'	Report	Furuhashi 6', 24', 60'; O'Riley 39'; Oh 67'; Turley 73'	Stadium: Lesser Hampden

=== Scottish Championship ===
2 August 2024 1	Falkirk	2–1	Queen's Park	Falkirk
19:45	Miller 33'; Mackie 48'	Report	Thomas 46'	Stadium: Falkirk Stadium; Attendance: 5,505; Referee: Iain Snedden

9 August 2024 2	Queen's Park	1–1	Livingston	Glasgow
19:45	Rudden 36'	Report	Clarke 60'	Stadium: Lesser Hampden; Attendance: 881; Referee: Graham Grainger

24 August 2024 3	Airdrieonians	0–2	Queen's Park	Airdrie
15:00		Report	Turner 2'; Rudden 24'; Ferrie (red card) 90'	Stadium: Excelsior Stadium; Attendance: 1,499; Referee: Craig Napier

31 August 2024 4	Partick Thistle	3–0	Queen's Park	Glasgow
15:00	Milne 11'; Fitzpatrick 72'; MacKenzie 89'	Report		Stadium: Firhill Stadium; Attendance: 4,034; Referee: Steven Kirkland

14 September 2024 5	Queen's Park	1–0	Greenock Morton	Glasgow
15:00	Thomas 44'	Report		Stadium: Lesser Hampden; Attendance: 883; Referee: Lloyd Wilson

21 September 2024 6	Queen's Park	1–1	Ayr United	Glasgow
15:00	Kerr 35'	Report	Dempsey 57'	Stadium: Hampden Park; Attendance: 1,635; Referee: Iain Snedden

28 September 2024 7	Dunfermline Athletic	1–2	Queen's Park	Dunfermline
15:00	Cooper 78'	Report	Rudden 15'; Welsh 61'	Stadium: East End Park; Attendance: 4,494; Referee: Duncan Nicolson

5 October 2024 8	Queen's Park	1–0	Hamilton Academical	Glasgow
15:00	Turner 62'	Report		Stadium: Hampden Park; Attendance: 1,259; Referee: Dan McFarlane

19 October 2024 9	Raith Rovers	1–1	Queen's Park	Kirkcaldy
15:00	Hamilton 39' (pen.); Easton (red card) 90+2'	Report	McLeish 62'	Stadium: Stark's Park; Attendance: 3,396; Referee: Calum Scott

26 October 2024 10	Queen's Park	0–1	Partick Thistle	Glasgow
15:00		Report	Chalmers 14'	Stadium: Hampden Park; Attendance: 2,779; Referee: Craig Napier

29 October 2024 11	Greenock Morton	0–1	Queen's Park	Greenock
19:45	Wilson (red card) 90'	Report	Rudden 25'	Stadium: Cappielow; Attendance: 1,741; Referee: Duncan Williams

2 November 2024 12	Livingston	1–1	Queen's Park	Livingston
15:00	May 50'	Report	Drozd 59'; MacGregor (red card) 63'	Stadium: Almondvale Stadium; Attendance: 1,138; Referee: Duncan Nicolson

9 November 2024 13	Queen's Park	2–1	Dunfermline Athletic	Glasgow
15:00	Duncan 31'; Turner 72'	Report	Todd 61'	Stadium: Hampden Park; Attendance: 1,331; Referee: Graham Grainger

16 November 2024 14	Ayr United	3–2	Queen's Park	Ayr
15:00	Henderson 31' (pen.); McKenzie 39'; Oakley 76'	Report	Hinds 81'; Turner 83'; Hickey-Fugaccia (red card) 90+3'	Stadium: Somerset Park; Attendance: 2,012; Referee: Calum Scott

22 November 2024 15	Queen's Park	0–1	Falkirk	Glasgow
19:45		Report	Nesbitt 26'	Stadium: Hampden Park; Attendance: 2,071; Referee: David Dickinson

7 December 2024 16	Queen's Park	2–0	Airdrieonians	Glasgow
15:00	Thomas 14'; Longridge 21'	Report		Stadium: Hampden Park; Attendance: 1,076; Referee: Nick Walsh

14 December 2024 17	Hamilton Academical	2–1	Queen's Park	Hamilton
15:00	Bradley 3', 37'	Report	Rudden 16' (pen.)	Stadium: New Douglas Park; Attendance: 1,076; Referee: Chris Graham

20 December 2024 18	Queen's Park	1–2	Raith Rovers	Glasgow
19:45	Duncan 74'	Report	Jamieson 41' (pen.); Connolly 69'	Stadium: Hampden Park; Attendance: 1,141; Referee: Grant Irvine

28 December 2024 19	Partick Thistle	2–1	Queen's Park	Glasgow
15:00	Graham 7', 47'	Report	Thomas 26'	Stadium: Firhill Stadium; Attendance: 4,350; Referee: Lloyd Wilson

4 January 2025 20	Queen's Park	2–0	Livingston	Glasgow
15:00	Turner 38', 52'; Mauchin (red card) 72'	Report		Stadium: Hampden Park; Attendance: 1,266; Referee: Peter Stuart

11 January 2025 21	Falkirk	0–0	Queen's Park	Falkirk
15:00		Report		Stadium: Falkirk Stadium; Attendance: 5,745; Referee: Chris Graham

25 January 2025 22	Queen's Park	1–2	Greenock Morton	Glasgow
15:00	Rudden 23'	Report	Reynolds 67'; Garrity 76'	Stadium: Hampden Park; Attendance: 1,398; Referee: Steven McLean

1 February 2025 23	Airdrieonians	2–1	Queen's Park	Airdrie
15:00	B.Wilson 45+1' (pen.), 65' (pen.)	Report	Scott 59'; Devine (red card) 90+5'	Stadium: Excelsior Stadium; Referee: Iain Snedden

15 February 2025 24	Queen's Park	1–2	Hamilton Academical	Glasgow
15:00	Welsh 60'	Report	Robinson 5'; Lamie 13'	Stadium: Hampden Park; Attendance: 1,147; Referee: Colin Steven

22 February 2025 25	Dunfermline Athletic	0–0	Queen's Park	Dunfermline
15:00		Report		Stadium: East End Park; Attendance: 4,527; Referee: Euan Anderson

1 March 2025 26	Raith Rovers	0–4	Queen's Park	Kirkcaldy
15:00		Report	Rudden 29'; Devine 49'; Montgomery 51'; Ujdur 72'	Stadium: Stark's Park; Attendance: 3,600; Referee: Dan McFarlane

4 March 2025 27	Queen's Park	2–3	Ayr United	Glasgow
19:45	Turner 49'; Rudden 54'	Report	Rus 66'; Dempsey 76'; Main 79'	Stadium: Hampden Park; Attendance: 1,557; Referee: Lloyd Wilson

11 March 2025 28	Queen's Park	0–2	Partick Thistle	Glasgow
19:45		Report	Chalmers 5'; Jakubiak 90+2'	Stadium: Hampden Park; Attendance: 1,758; Referee: Ross Hardie

15 March 2025 29	Queen's Park	0–4	Falkirk	Glasgow
15:00		Report	Henderson 43'; Oliver 51'; Miller 59'; Lang 72'	Stadium: Hampden Park; Attendance: 2,685; Referee: Duncan Nicolson

22 March 2025 30	Greenock Morton	2–1	Queen's Park	Greenock
15:00	Moffat 20'; Garrity 64'	Report	Rudden 69'	Stadium: Cappielow; Attendance: 2,044; Referee: Peter Stuart

2 April 2025 31	Queen's Park	0–5	Airdrieonians	Glasgow
19:45		Report	Hancock 11', 43'; Diack 23', 57'; Mochrie 70'	Stadium: Hampden Park; Attendance: 1,034; Referee: Don Robertson

5 April 2025 32	Livingston	3–0	Queen's Park	Livingston
15:00	Smith 14'; Muirhead 17'; Kelly 40'	Report		Stadium: Almondvale Stadium; Attendance: 1,396; Referee: Dan McFarlane

12 April 2025 33	Queen's Park	0–1	Dunfermline Athletic	Glasgow
15:00		Report	Kane 69'	Stadium: Hampden Park; Attendance: 1,705; Referee: David Dickinson

19 April 2025 34	Hamilton Academical	0–0	Queen's Park	Hamilton
15:00		Report		Stadium: New Douglas Park; Attendance: 1,102; Referee: Don Robertson

26 April 2025 35	Ayr United	2–2	Queen's Park	Ayr
15:00	Murphy 16'; McKenzie 54'	Report	Drozd 22'; MacGregor 31'	Stadium: Somerset Park; Attendance: 2,122; Referee: Sean Murdoch

2 May 2025 36	Queen's Park	1–5	Raith Rovers	Glasgow
19:45	Drozd 50'	Report	Fordyce 41'; Vaughan 45' (pen.), 59'; Easton 74' (pen.); Marsh 85'	Stadium: Hampden Park; Attendance: 2,609; Referee: Ryan Lee

=== Scottish League Cup ===
==== Group stage ====
13 July 2024 1	Peterhead	0–5	Queen's Park	Peterhead
15:00		Report	Rudden 30'; MacGregor 60'; Mauchin 80'; McLeish 85'; Brown 90+2' (o.g.)	Stadium: Balmoor Stadium; Attendance: 548; Referee: Duncan Nicholson

16 July 2024 2	Hibernian	5–1	Queen's Park	Edinburgh
19:45	O'Hora 15'; Boyle 19', 77'; Molotnikov 45+2'; Levitt 72'	Report	Turner 90+6'	Stadium: Easter Road; Attendance: 4,795; Referee: Ross Hardie

23 July 2024 3	Queen's Park	4–0	Elgin City	Glasgow
19:45	MacGregor 40', 44'; Thomas 51'; Scott 71'	Report		Stadium: Lesser Hampden; Attendance: 478; Referee: Lloyd Wilson

27 July 2024 4	Queen's Park	6–0	Kelty Hearts	Glasgow
15:00	Thomas 11'; Welsh 32'; MacGregor 42', 61'; Turner 57', 90'	Report		Stadium: Lesser Hampden; Attendance: 665; Referee: Matthew McDermid

==== Knockout phase ====
17 August 2024 Second round	Aberdeen	1–0	Queen's Park	Aberdeen
15:00	Keskinen 90+2'	Report		Stadium: Pittodrie Stadium; Attendance: 8,939; Referee: Colin Steven

=== Scottish Challenge Cup ===
8 September 2024 Third round	Queen's Park	1–0	Edinburgh City	Glasgow
15:00	Turner 59'	Report		Stadium: Lesser Hampden; Attendance: 597; Referee: Peter Stuart

11 October 2024 Fourth round	Annan Athletic	1–4	Queen's Park	Annan
19:45	Maxwell 85'	Report	McLeish 26'; Duncan 28'; Rudden 63'; Ujdur 76'	Stadium: Galabank; Attendance: 423; Referee: Gavin Duncan

3 December 2024 Quarter-finals	Queen's Park	3–1	Rangers B	Glasgow
19:45	Thomas 47'; Turner 55'; Hutton 68' (o.g.)	Report	McKinnon 26'; Nsiala (red card) 36'	Stadium: Lesser Hampden; Attendance: 692; Referee: Peter Stuart

28 January 2025 Semi-finals	Queen's Park	6–2 (a.e.t.)	East Kilbride	Glasgow
19:45	Rudden 1', 97'; Duncan 22'; Evans 92', 109'; Connelly 97' (o.g.)	Report	Leitch 31'; Ferguson 44'	Stadium: Lesser Hampden; Attendance: 758; Referee: Lloyd Wilson

30 March 2025 Final	Queen's Park	0–5	Livingston	Falkirk
16:10		Report	Muirhead 26'; May 45'; Yengi 50'; Shinnie 82'; Brandon 90+1'	Stadium: Falkirk Stadium; Attendance: 4,079; Referee: Calum Scott

=== Scottish Cup ===
30 November 2024 Third round	Queen's Park	2–2 (a.e.t.) (7–6 p)	Partick Thistle	Glasgow
15:00	Longridge 34'; MacGregor 42'	Report	Crawford 12'; Tizzard 64' (o.g.)	Stadium: Hampden Park; Attendance: 1,769; Referee: Euan Anderson

18 January 2025 Fourth round	Queen's Park	3–2 (a.e.t.)	Montrose	Glasgow
15:00	McLeish 45+1'; Rudden 90+1'; Scott 98'	Report	Lyons 56', 60'	Stadium: Hampden Park; Attendance: 856; Referee: Dan McFarlane

9 February 2025 Fifth round	Rangers	0–1	Queen's Park	Glasgow
15:30		Report	Drozd 69'	Stadium: Ibrox Stadium; Attendance: 35,628; Referee: Calum Scott

8 March 2025 Quarter-finals	Aberdeen	4–1	Queen's Park	Aberdeen
12:30	Nisbet 27'; Dabbagh 28', 52'; Shinnie 45+4'	Report	Rudden 68'	Stadium: Pittodrie Stadium; Attendance: 10,705; Referee: David Dickinson

=== Glasgow Cup ===
2 September 2024 Group stage	Queen's Park	2–2 (5–4 p)	Partick Thistle	Pollok
14:00	McLeish 46'; McVey (red card); McGarva	Report	Diack 55'; Falconer 90'	Stadium: Lochinch Park

4 February 2025 Group stage	Queen's Park	1–3	Rangers B	Glasgow
	Sowa (pen.)	Report		Stadium: Lesser Hampden

11 February 2025 Group stage	Clyde	3–2	Queen's Park	Airdrie
	Williamson; Trialist; Docherty	Report	Bradley (pen.)	Stadium: Excelsior Stadium

14 March 2025 Group stage	Celtic B	4–3	Queen's Park	Lennoxtown
14:00				Stadium: Lennoxtown training centre

== Player statistics ==
As of 2 May 2025 (UTC)

No.	Pos	Nat	Player	Total		Championship		League Cup		Challenge Cup		Scottish Cup		Glasgow Cup	
No.	Pos	Nat	Player	Apps	Goals	Apps	Goals	Apps	Goals	Apps	Goals	Apps	Goals	Apps	Goals
1	GK	(England) ENG	Calum Ferrie	44	0	34+0	0	5+0	0	1+0	0	4+0	0	0+0	0
2	DF	(Scotland) SCO	Zach Mauchin	26	1	7+9	0	1+3	1	3+0	0	3+0	0	0+0	0
3	DF	(England) ENG	Josh Scott	29	3	12+6	1	5+0	1	3+0	0	2+1	1	0+0	0
4	MF	(Scotland) SCO	Sean Welsh	44	3	32+0	2	4+1	1	4+0	0	3+0	0	0+0	0
5	DF	(England) ENG	Charlie Fox	1	0	0+1	0	0+0	0	0+0	0	0+0	0	0+0	0
6	DF	(Australia) AUS	Nikola Ujdur	17	2	10+0	1	1+1	0	1+1	1	3+0	0	0+0	0
7	FW	(Scotland) SCO	Louis Longridge	48	2	21+13	1	4+1	0	4+1	0	4+0	1	0+0	0
8	MF	(Scotland) SCO	Jack Thomson	19	0	11+2	0	5+0	0	0+0	0	1+0	0	0+0	0
9	FW	(England) ENG	Max Thompson	3	0	0+0	0	0+0	0	0+2	0	0+1	0	0+0	0
10	MF	(Scotland) SCO	Grant Savoury	2	0	0+2	0	0+0	0	0+0	0	0+0	0	0+0	0
11	MF	(England) ENG	Kyle Hurst	13	0	6+4	0	0+0	0	1+0	0	2+0	0	0+0	0
12	DF	(England) ENG	Ben Jackson	12	0	9+1	0	0+0	0	2+0	0	0+0	0	0+0	0
14	MF	(Scotland) SCO	Roddy MacGregor	33	7	17+6	1	4+1	5	3+0	0	1+1	1	0+0	0
15	DF	(England) ENG	Will Tizzard	40	0	28+0	0	2+1	0	4+0	0	4+0	0	0+1	0
17	FW	(Scotland) SCO	Zak Rudden	47	15	32+2	9	5+0	1	4+0	3	3+1	2	0+0	0
19	FW	(England) ENG	Josh Hinds	26	1	1+13	1	0+5	0	0+4	0	0+3	0	0+0	0
20	MF	(England) ENG	Jack Turner	47	12	29+5	7	5+0	3	3+1	2	4+0	0	0+0	0
21	GK	(Scotland) SCO	Jack Willis	7	0	1+1	0	0+0	0	4+0	0	0+0	0	1+0	0
22	MF	(Wales) WAL	Jadan Raymond	6	0	2+3	0	0+0	0	0+0	0	0+1	0	0+0	0
23	MF	(Scotland) SCO	Ryan Duncan	39	4	24+7	2	0+0	0	3+2	2	3+0	0	0+0	0
24	DF	(Scotland) SCO	Adam Devine	14	1	12+1	1	0+0	0	0+0	0	1+0	0	0+0	0
28	FW	(England) ENG	Seb Drozd	28	4	10+14	3	0+0	0	1+0	0	1+2	1	0+0	0
29	FW	(Northern Ireland) NIR	Reece Evans	14	2	2+8	0	0+0	0	0+3	2	0+0	0	1+0	0
30	DF	(Scotland) SCO	Cammy Kerr	21	1	15+0	1	4+0	0	1+0	0	1+0	0	0+0	0
32	DF	(Scotland) SCO	Joseph Smith	2	0	0+1	0	1+0	0	0+0	0	0+0	0	0+0	0
33	DF	(Scotland) SCO	Adam Montgomery	14	1	11+1	1	0+0	0	1+0	0	0+1	0	0+0	0
37	FW	(Scotland) SCO	Rocco Hickey-Fugaccia	31	0	2+18	0	0+1	0	3+2	0	1+2	0	2+0	0
38	DF	(Scotland) SCO	Leon King	9	0	8+1	0	0+0	0	0+0	0	0+0	0	0+0	0
39	FW	(Scotland) SCO	Timam Scott	10	0	3+3	0	0+0	0	0+2	0	0+0	0	2+0	0
44	MF	(Scotland) SCO	Magnus MacKenzie	5	0	0+1	0	0+2	0	0+0	0	0+0	0	2+0	0
45	DF	(Scotland) SCO	Darryl Carrick	4	0	0+0	0	0+0	0	0+2	0	0+0	0	2+0	0
46	FW	(Scotland) SCO	Aiden McGinlay	9	0	6+0	0	0+0	0	0+0	0	0+1	0	2+0	0
47	MF	(Scotland) SCO	Michael Collie	2	0	0+0	0	0+1	0	0+1	0	0+0	0	0+0	0
53	DF	(England) ENG	Henry Fieldson	18	0	11+3	0	0+1	0	2+0	0	1+0	0	0+0	0
54	MF	(Scotland) SCO	Jay McGarva	2	1	0+0	0	0+0	0	0+0	0	0+0	0	2+0	1
60	GK	(Poland) POL	Milosz Sliwinski	1	0	1+0	0	0+0	0	0+0	0	0+0	0	0+0	0
Players who left the club during the 2024–25 season
6	DF	(Scotland) SCO	Danny Wilson	2	0	0+0	0	2+0	0	0+0	0	0+0	0	0+0	0
11	FW	(Scotland) SCO	Dom Thomas	23	7	15+0	4	5+0	2	2+0	1	1+0	0	0+0	0
16	DF	(Scotland) SCO	Lewis Reid	2	0	0+0	0	2+0	0	0+0	0	0+0	0	0+0	0
18	MF	(Scotland) SCO	Liam McLeish	30	5	3+16	1	0+5	1	2+1	1	1+1	1	1+0	1
25	DF	(Scotland) SCO	Dane Murray	20	0	18+0	0	1+0	0	1+0	0	0+0	0	0+0	0
26	MF	(Scotland) SCO	Ricky Waugh	0	0	0+0	0	0+0	0	0+0	0	0+0	0	0+0	0
31	GK	(Scotland) SCO	Sam Kane	0	0	0+0	0	0+0	0	0+0	0	0+0	0	0+0	0
36	MF	(Scotland) SCO	Lennon Connolly	1	0	0+0	0	0+0	0	0+0	0	0+0	0	0+1	0
42	MF	(Scotland) SCO	Tyrese McDonnell	5	0	0+1	0	0+2	0	0+1	0	0+0	0	0+1	0

== Team statistics ==
=== Championship table ===
Pos	Team	Pld	W	D	L	GF	GA	GD	Pts	Promotion, qualification or relegation
6	Greenock Morton	36	12	12	12	42	48	−6	48	
7	Dunfermline Athletic	36	9	8	19	28	43	−15	35	
8	Queen's Park	36	9	8	19	36	55	−19	35	
9	Airdrieonians (O)	36	7	8	21	34	62	−28	29	Qualification for the Championship play-offs
10	Hamilton Academical (R)	36	10	6	20	38	64	−26	21 (Note: Hamilton Academical were deducted 15 points for breaching multiple SPFL Rules.)	Relegation to League One

Rules for classification: 1) Points; 2) Goal difference; 3) Goals scored; 4) Head-to-to head points; 5) Head-to-head goal difference; 6) Play-off (only for deciding promotion, play-off participation and relegation).
(O) Play-off winners; (R) Relegated

=== League Cup table ===
Pos	Team	Pld	W	PW	PL	L	GF	GA	GD	Pts	Qualification	HIB	QPA	PET	KEL	ELG
1	Hibernian	4	3	0	0	1	14	2	+12	9	Qualification for the second round	—	5–1	4–0	—	—
2	Queen's Park	4	3	0	0	1	16	5	+11	9	Qualification for the second round	—	—	—	6–0	4–0
3	Peterhead	4	2	0	0	2	5	11	−6	6		—	0–5	—	—	4–2
4	Kelty Hearts	4	1	0	1	2	2	8	−6	4		1–0	—	0–1	—	—
5	Elgin City	4	0	1	0	3	3	14	−11	2		0–5	—	—	p1–1	—

Rules for classification: 1) goal difference, 2) goals scored, 3) away goals scored, 4) matches won, 5) away matches won, 6) drawing of lots.

== Transfers ==
=== Players in ===
Player	From	Fee
(Scotland) Jack Wills	(Scotland) St Johnstone	Free
(Scotland) Magnus MacKenzie	(Scotland) Celtic	Free
(Scotland) Roddy MacGregor	(Scotland) Inverness CT	Free
(England) Josh Hinds	(England) Truro City	Free
(Scotland) Zak Rudden	(Scotland) Dundee	Free
(Scotland) Cammy Kerr	(Scotland) Dundee	Free
(Australia) Nikola Ujdur	(Scotland) Inverness CT	Undisclosed
(Canada) Josiah Sowa	(Canada) North Toronto Nitros	Free
(England) Henry Fieldson	(England) Sunderland	Free
(Scotland) Jay McGarva	(Scotland) Hibernian	Free
(Northern Ireland) Reece Evans	(England) Leicester City	Free
(England) Seb Drozd	(England) Millwall	Free
(England) Max Thompson	(Slovakia) MFK Skalica	Free

=== Players out ===
Player	To	Fee
(Scotland) Callum Haspell		Free
(Scotland) Jaques Heraghty		Free
(England) Patrick Jarrett	(England) Bury	Free
(England) Thomas Robson	(Scotland) Clyde	Free
(Republic of Ireland) Cillian Sheridan	(Scotland) Brechin City	Free
(Scotland) Ben Ferguson	(Scotland) East Kilbride	Free
(Scotland) Andrew Lind	(Scotland) Broomhill	Free
(Scotland) Chris Mahon	(Scotland) Broomhill	Free
(Scotland) Kane Thomson	(Scotland) Alloa Athletic	Free
(Scotland) Cameron Bruce	(Scotland) Airdrieonians	Free
(Scotland) Alex Bannon	(England) Burton Albion	Undisclosed
(Scotland) Aaron Healy	(Scotland) Arthurlie	Free
(Republic of Ireland) Ruari Paton	(England) Port Vale	Undisclosed
(Scotland) Liam Russell	(Scotland) Ayr United	Free
(Scotland) Danny Wilson	(Scotland) Livingston	Free
(Scotland) Dom Thomas	(Republic of Ireland) Derry City	Free
(Scotland) Scott Williamson	(Scotland) Clyde	Free

=== Loans in ===
Player	From	Fee
(Scotland) Dane Murray	(Scotland) Celtic	Loan
(Scotland) Ryan Duncan	(Scotland) Aberdeen	Loan
(England) Ben Jackson	(England) Brighton & Hove Albion	Loan
(Scotland) Adam Devine	(Scotland) Rangers	Loan
(England) Kyle Hurst	(England) Doncaster Rovers	Loan
(Wales) Jadan Raymond	(England) Crystal Palace	Loan
(Scotland) Adam Montgomery	(Scotland) Celtic	Loan
(Scotland) Leon King	(Scotland) Rangers	Loan

=== Loans out ===
Player	To	Fee
(Scotland) Ricky Waugh	(Scotland) Stirling Albion	Loan
(Scotland) Scott Williamson	(Scotland) Kelty Hearts	Loan
(Scotland) Alex Fairlie	(Scotland) Broomhill	Loan
(Scotland) Archie Graham	(Scotland) Darvel	Loan
(Scotland) Tyrece McDonnell	(Scotland) Alloa Athletic	Loan
(Scotland) Joseph Smith	(Scotland) Broxburn Athletic	Loan
(Scotland) Lucas McCormick	(Scotland) Albion Rovers	Loan
(Scotland) Lewis Reid	(Scotland) Stranraer	Loan
(Scotland) Sam Kane	(Scotland) Stranraer	Loan
(Scotland) Liam McLeish	(Scotland) Kelty Hearts	Loan
(Scotland) Lennon Connolly	(Scotland) Bo'ness United	Loan

== See also ==
- List of Queen's Park F.C. seasons
