= 2023–24 Queen's Park F.C. season =

Queen's Park
2023–24 season
- Chief Executive: Leeann Dempster
- Manager: Robin Veldman (until 9 December); Paul Nuijten (Interim); Callum Davidson (from 9 January)
- Stadium: Hampden Park
- Scottish Championship: Eighth place
- Scottish Cup: Third round
- League Cup: Group stage
- Challenge Cup: Fourth round
- Glasgow Cup: Semi-final
- Top goalscorer: League: Ruari Paton (17); All: Ruari Paton (22)
- Highest home attendance: 3,109, vs. Dundee United, Championship, 6 April 2024
- Lowest home attendance: 676, vs. Elgin City, League Cup, 25 July 2023
- Average home league attendance: 1,839
Home colours	Away colours

The 2023–24 season was Queen's Park's second season in the Scottish Championship following their promotion from League One at the end of the 2021–22 season. Queen's also competed in the Scottish Cup, League Cup, Challenge Cup and the Glasgow Cup.

== Summary ==
Following their defeat to Partick Thistle in the Premiership play-offs at the conclusion of the previous season, Owen Coyle announced he would be stepping down from his role as head coach.

On 8 June 2023, Queen's announced that they entered an agreement with the Scottish Football Association to use Hampden Park as their ground for home matches ahead of the upcoming season.

On 17 June, the club confirmed the appointment of former Ajax and Anderlecht coach Robin Veldman as their new head coach.

On 29 November, the club announced that director of football Marijn Beuker would leave the club to take up a similar role at Ajax.

After a slump in form following a promising start to the league campaign, Veldman left his position as head coach on 9 December.

On 6 January Leeann Dempster announced her intention to stand down as the club's CEO when a suitable replacement could be found.

Former St Johnstone manager Callum Davidson was unveiled as Queen's new head coach on 9 January.

On 26 January the club announced that their academy squad, known as Young Queen's Park would be rebranded to Queen's Park B.

== Results and fixtures ==
Win Draw Loss Postponed

=== Pre-season and friendlies ===
8 July 2023	Ross County	1–2	Queen's Park	Dingwall
15:00	Dhanda 34'	Report	Thomson 79'; Paton 88'	Stadium: Victoria Park

10 July 2023	Queen's Park	0–1	Livingston	Glasgow
19:45		Report	Anderson 50'	Stadium: Lesser Hampden

=== Scottish Championship ===
5 August 2023 1	Inverness CT	1–2	Queen's Park	Inverness
15:00	Davidson 86'	Report	Thomas 31'; Robson 48'	Stadium: Caledonian Stadium; Attendance: 2,030; Referee: Graham Grainger

12 August 2023 2	Queen's Park	2–1	Arbroath	Glasgow
15:00	Hepburn 13'; Paton 75'	Report	McIntosh 71'	Stadium: Lesser Hampden; Attendance: 916; Referee: Ross Hardie

19 August 2023 3	Arbroath	0–1	Queen's Park	Arbroath
15:00		Report	Paton 69'	Stadium: Gayfield Park; Attendance: 1,477; Referee: Scott Lambie

26 August 2023 4	Partick Thistle	3–1	Queen's Park	Glasgow
15:00	McInroy 26', 57'; Graham 30'	Report	Paton 32'	Stadium: Firhill Stadium; Attendance: 3,365; Referee: Grant Irvine

2 September 2023 5	Raith Rovers	3–2	Queen's Park	Kirkcaldy
15:00	Smith 8'; Vaughan 86', 90+4'	Report	Tizzard (red card) 33'; Turner 64'; Thomas 73'	Stadium: Stark's Park; Attendance: 2,984; Referee: Duncan Williams

16 September 2023 6	Queen's Park	0–2	Dunfermline Athletic	Glasgow
15:00		Report	McCann 51', 67'	Stadium: Hampden Park; Attendance: 1,968; Referee: Scott Lambie

22 September 2023 7	Queen's Park	2–5	Ayr United	Glasgow
19:45	Paton 28'; Hepburn 52'	Report	Chalmers 6', 12'; Rose 32'; Murphy 44'; Dowds 53'	Stadium: Hampden Park; Attendance: 1,651; Referee: David Dickinson

30 September 2023 8	Dundee United	4–1	Queen's Park	Dundee
15:00	Watt 37', 61'; McMann 56'; Fotheringham 67'	Report	Thomson 1'	Stadium: Tannadice Park; Attendance: 7,256; Referee: Steven Kirkland

7 October 2023 9	Queen's Park	0–0	Greenock Morton	Glasgow
15:00		Report		Stadium: Hampden Park; Attendance: 1,079; Referee: Craig Napier

20 October 2023 10	Airdrieonians	1–1	Queen's Park	Airdrie
19:45	Gallagher 39'	Report	Turner 46'; Hepburn (red card) 90+3'	Stadium: Excelsior Stadium; Attendance: 1,474; Referee: Grant Irvine

27 October 2023 11	Queen's Park	2–2	Partick Thistle	Glasgow
19:45	Paton 52' (pen.); Turner 56'	Report	Lawless 45+2' (pen.); Adeloye 58'	Stadium: Hampden Park; Attendance: 2,894; Referee: Chris Graham

4 November 2023 12	Ayr United	2–2	Queen's Park	Ayr
15:00	Dowds 23', 38'	Report	Bannon 58'; Paton 90+5'	Stadium: Somerset Park; Attendance: 2,046; Referee: William Collum

11 November 2023 13	Queen's Park	2–3	Raith Rovers	Glasgow
15:00	Turner 70'; Paton 74'	Report	Vaughan 39'; Murray (red card) 61'; Hamilton 89'; Millen 90+2' (pen.)	Stadium: Hampden Park; Attendance: 1,689; Referee: Craig Napier

9 December 2023 15	Queen's Park	1–4	Inverness CT	Glasgow
15:00	Turner 10'	Report	Anderson 21'; Ujdur 59'; Wotherspoon 75'; Mckay 80' (pen.)	Stadium: Hampden Park; Attendance: 1,203; Referee: Craig Napier

16 December 2023 16	Greenock Morton	1–0	Queen's Park	Greenock
15:00	Muirhead 8'; Oakley (red card) 44'	Report		Stadium: Cappielow; Attendance: 1,651; Referee: Grant Irvine

22 December 2023 17	Queen's Park	0–0	Dundee United	Glasgow
19:45		Report		Stadium: Hampden Park; Attendance: 2,536; Referee: Steven McLean

30 December 2023 18	Queen's Park	1–2	Airdrieonians	Glasgow
15:00	Thomas 34' (pen.)	Report	Hancock 66'; Todorov 90+3'	Stadium: Hampden Park; Attendance: 1,227; Referee: Don Robertson

2 January 2024 19	Partick Thistle	3–2	Queen's Park	Glasgow
15:00	Milne 27'; Fitzpatrick 48'; Neilson 85'	Report	Paton 31', 90'	Stadium: Firhill Stadium; Attendance: 3,212; Referee: Steven Kirkland

5 January 2024 20	Queen's Park	2–1	Dunfermline Athletic	Glasgow
19:45	Paton 55'; Thomas 79'	Report	Summers 85'	Stadium: Hampden Park; Attendance: 1,354; Referee: William Collum

13 January 2024 21	Raith Rovers	1–2	Queen's Park	Kirkcaldy
15:00	Hamilton 3'	Report	Bruce 42'; Welsh 56'	Stadium: Stark's Park; Attendance: 3,501; Referee: Peter Stuart

27 January 2024 22	Queen's Park	1–2	Ayr United	Glasgow
15:00	Paton 63'; Welsh (red card) 65'	Report	Murphy 40'; McKenzie 74'	Stadium: Hampden Park; Attendance: 1,927; Referee: Steven Kirkland

3 February 2024 23	Inverness CT	0–1	Queen's Park	Inverness
15:00		Report	Thomas 50'	Stadium: Caledonian Stadium; Attendance: 1,962; Referee: Euan Anderson

10 February 2024 14	Dunfermline Athletic	0–3	Queen's Park	Dunfermline
15:00		Report	Turner 66'; Thomas 75'; Carse 90+4'	Stadium: East End Park; Attendance: 4,433; Referee: Iain Snedden
Note: Match postponed due to a frozen pitch.

17 February 2024 24	Queen's Park	0–0	Greenock Morton	Glasgow
15:00		Report		Stadium: Hampden Park; Attendance: 2,113; Referee: Steven McLean

24 February 2024 25	Dundee United	3–1	Queen's Park	Dundee
15:00	Moult 37'; Tillson 44'; Middleton 81'	Report	Paton 23'	Stadium: Tannadice Park; Attendance: 7,341; Referee: Ross Hardie

27 February 2024 26	Queen's Park	6–0	Arbroath	Glasgow
19:45	Paton 4', 23'; Sheridan 14'; Thomas 49'; McLeish 62'; McKinstry 85'	Report		Stadium: Hampden Park; Attendance: 1,073; Referee: Colin Steven

2 March 2024 27	Airdrieonians	1–1	Queen's Park	Airdrie
15:00	Hancock 63'	Report	Thomas 13'	Stadium: Excelsior Stadium; Attendance: 1,458; Referee: William Collum

9 March 2024 28	Queen's Park	2–2	Partick Thistle	Glasgow
15:00	Sheridan 38'; Paton 52'	Report	Adeloye 64'; Graham 70' (pen.)	Stadium: Hampden Park; Attendance: 3,001; Referee: Iain Snedden

16 March 2024 29	Queen's Park	0–0	Raith Rovers	Glasgow
15:00		Report		Stadium: Hampden Park; Attendance: 1,883; Referee: Kevin Clancy

23 March 2024 30	Ayr United	1–2	Queen's Park	Ayr
15:00	Sanders 78'	Report	Paton 19'; Sheridan 59'	Stadium: Somerset Park; Attendance: 2,264; Referee: Colin Steven

30 March 2024 31	Greenock Morton	2–0	Queen's Park	Greenock
15:00	Broadfoot 68'; Muirhead 72'	Report		Stadium: Cappielow; Attendance: 1,841; Referee: Chris Graham

6 April 2024 32	Queen's Park	0–5	Dundee United	Glasgow
15:00		Report	Fotheringham 45', 64'; Moult 55'; Graham 59'; Sibbald 70'	Stadium: Hampden Park; Attendance: 3,109; Referee: Duncan Williams

13 April 2024 33	Queen's Park	0–1	Inverness CT	Glasgow
15:00		Report	Harper 25'	Stadium: Hampden Park; Attendance: 1,463; Referee: Alan Muir

20 April 2024 34	Dunfermline Athletic	0–0	Queen's Park	Dunfermline
15:00		Report		Stadium: East End Park; Attendance: 5,123; Referee: Colin Steven

27 April 2024 35	Arbroath	0–5	Queen's Park	Arbroath
15:00		Report	Thomas 17', 81'; Sheridan 27'; Scott 37'; Welsh 59'	Stadium: Gayfield Park; Attendance: 1,322; Referee: Kevin Clancy

3 May 2024 36	Queen's Park	2–0	Airdrieonians	Glasgow
19:45	Paton 26'; McLeish 82'	Report		Stadium: Hampden Park; Attendance: 2,009; Referee: Ross Hardie

=== Scottish League Cup ===
==== Group stage ====
15 July 2023 1	East Fife	0–0 (4–2 p)	Queen's Park	Methil
15:00		Report		Stadium: Bayview Stadium; Attendance: 584; Referee: Lloyd Wilson

22 July 2023 2	Motherwell	1–0	Queen's Park	Motherwell
15:00	Obika 29'	Report		Stadium: Fir Park; Attendance: 3,161; Referee: Steven McLean

25 July 2023 3	Queen's Park	5–0	Elgin City	Glasgow
19:45	Paton 7', 33', 53', 66'; Fox 80'	Report		Stadium: Lesser Hampden; Attendance: 676; Referee: Chris Graham

29 July 2023 4	Queen's Park	1–2	Queen of the South	Glasgow
15:00	Fox (red card) 47'; Healy 89'	Report	Reilly 65'; Cochrane 77'	Stadium: Lesser Hampden; Attendance: 826; Referee: Grant Irvine

=== Scottish Challenge Cup ===
9 September 2023 Third round	(Wales) Bala Town	0–3	Queen's Park	Bala
17:15		Report	Turner 20'; Hepburn 44'; Paton 90+5'	Stadium: Maes Tegid; Attendance: 317; Referee: Aaron Wyn Jones

14 October 2023 Fourth round	Falkirk	1–0	Queen's Park	Falkirk
15:00	Allan 6' (pen.)	Report		Stadium: Falkirk Stadium; Attendance: 2,427; Referee: Scott Lambie

=== Scottish Cup ===
25 November 2023 Third round	Partick Thistle	3–0	Queen's Park	Glasgow
15:00	Alston 36'; Fitzpatrick 41', 50'	Report		Stadium: Firhill Stadium; Attendance: 2,520; Referee: Iain Snedden

=== Glasgow Cup ===
31 October 2023 Group stage	Rangers B	4–0	Queen's Park	Milngavie
15:00	Gentles 34'; Rice 60'; Graham 61'; Pasnik 85'	Report		Stadium: Rangers Training Centre

20 February 2024 Group stage	Queen's Park	0–1	Celtic B	Glasgow
15:00		Report	Donovan 22'	Stadium: Lesser Hampden

10 April 2024 Group stage	Partick Thistle	1–4	Queen's Park	Springburn
15:00	Horn 63'	Report	McCormick 14', 19'; Williamson; Fiddes 73'	Stadium: Petershill Park

9 May 2024 Semi-final	Rangers B	2–1	Queen's Park	Milngavie
15:00	Ishaka 18'; Curtis 65'	McDonnell 68'		Stadium: Rangers Training Centre

== Player statistics ==
As of 9 May 2024 (UTC)

No.	Pos	Nat	Player	Total		Championship		League Cup		Challenge Cup		Scottish Cup		Glasgow Cup	
No.	Pos	Nat	Player	Apps	Goals	Apps	Goals	Apps	Goals	Apps	Goals	Apps	Goals	Apps	Goals
1	GK	(England) ENG	Calum Ferrie	34	0	29+0	0	2+0	0	2+0	0	0+0	0	1+0	0
2	DF	(Scotland) SCO	Ben McPherson	26	0	18+7	0	0+0	0	0+0	0	0+0	0	1+0	0
3	DF	(England) ENG	Thomas Robson	37	1	26+4	1	2+2	0	2+0	0	0+0	0	1+0	0
4	DF	(Scotland) SCO	Alex Bannon	35	1	25+5	1	1+2	0	1+0	0	0+0	0	1+0	0
5	DF	(England) ENG	Charlie Fox	22	1	13+1	0	4+0	1	2+0	0	0+0	0	2+0	0
6	DF	(Scotland) SCO	Danny Wilson	10	0	9+1	0	0+0	0	0+0	0	0+0	0	0+0	0
7	FW	(Republic of Ireland) IRL	Cillian Sheridan	12	4	8+4	4	0+0	0	0+0	0	0+0	0	0+0	0
8	MF	(Scotland) SCO	Jack Thomson	38	1	31+0	1	4+0	0	2+0	0	0+0	0	1+0	0
9	FW	(Republic of Ireland) IRL	Ruari Paton	43	22	36+0	17	4+0	4	2+0	1	0+0	0	1+0	0
10	MF	(Scotland) SCO	Grant Savoury	0	0	0+0	0	0+0	0	0+0	0	0+0	0	0+0	0
11	FW	(Scotland) SCO	Dom Thomas	39	10	32+0	10	4+0	0	2+0	0	0+0	0	1+0	0
15	DF	(England) ENG	Will Tizzard	25	0	13+7	0	3+1	0	0+0	0	0+0	0	1+0	0
16	MF	(Scotland) SCO	Cameron Bruce	26	1	7+13	1	2+1	0	0+1	0	0+0	0	1+1	0
17	FW	(England) ENG	Rocco Hickey-Fugaccia	4	0	0+0	0	0+0	0	0+0	0	0+0	0	4+0	0
17	FW	(Wales) WAL	James Crole	1	0	0+1	0	0+0	0	0+0	0	0+0	0	0+0	0
18	MF	(Scotland) SCO	Stuart McKinstry	21	1	7+13	1	0+0	0	0+0	0	0+0	0	1+0	0
19	FW	(Scotland) SCO	Scott Williamson	4	1	0+3	0	0+0	0	0+0	0	0+0	0	1+0	1
20	MF	(England) ENG	Jack Turner	43	4	29+7	3	4+0	0	1+1	1	0+0	0	1+0	0
21	MF	(Scotland) SCO	Lennon Connolly	4	0	0+0	0	0+0	0	0+0	0	0+0	0	4+0	0
22	DF	(Scotland) SCO	Lewis Reid	8	0	4+2	0	0+0	0	0+1	0	0+0	0	1+0	0
23	FW	(Scotland) SCO	Louis Longridge	39	0	27+6	0	3+0	0	2+0	0	0+0	0	0+1	0
24	DF	(Scotland) SCO	Joseph Smith	3	0	0+0	0	0+0	0	0+0	0	0+0	0	2+1	0
24	DF	(England) ENG	Joshua Scott	16	1	14+1	1	0+0	0	0+0	0	0+0	0	0+1	0
25	MF	(Scotland) SCO	Alex Fairlie	5	0	1+1	0	0+0	0	0+0	0	0+0	0	3+0	0
26	MF	(Scotland) SCO	Ricky Waugh	5	0	0+0	0	0+0	0	0+1	0	0+0	0	4+0	0
27	MF	(England) ENG	Patrick Jarrett	18	0	5+8	0	1+2	0	0+2	0	0+0	0	0+0	0
28	FW	(Scotland) SCO	Lucas McCormick	14	2	0+5	0	0+4	0	1+0	0	0+0	0	4+0	2
29	FW	(Scotland) SCO	Liam McLeish	21	2	1+14	2	0+4	0	0+2	0	0+0	0	0+0	0
30	GK	(Scotland) SCO	Jack Willis	1	0	0+0	0	0+0	0	0+0	0	0+0	0	1+0	0
31	GK	(Scotland) SCO	Sam Kane	3	0	0+0	0	0+0	0	0+0	0	0+0	0	3+0	0
33	DF	(Scotland) SCO	Zach Mauchin	17	0	5+10	0	0+0	0	0+0	0	0+0	0	2+0	0
35	MF	(Scotland) SCO	MacKenzie Carse	9	1	1+8	1	0+0	0	0+0	0	0+0	0	0+0	0
38	DF	(Scotland) SCO	Callum Haspell	2	0	0+0	0	0+0	0	0+0	0	0+0	0	2+0	0
44	MF	(Scotland) SCO	Sean Welsh	15	2	15+0	2	0+0	0	0+0	0	0+0	0	0+0	0
Players who left the club during the 2023–24 season
6	MF	(England) ENG	Jack Spong	27	0	19+2	0	2+1	0	2+0	0	0+0	0	1+0	0
7	MF	(Scotland) SCO	Barry Hepburn	21	3	9+5	2	4+0	0	2+0	1	0+0	0	0+1	0
12	GK	(Scotland) SCO	Jacques Heraghty	0	0	0+0	0	0+0	0	0+0	0	0+0	0	0+0	0
14	FW	(Scotland) SCO	Aaron Healey	11	1	1+5	0	0+3	1	1+0	0	0+0	0	1+0	0
30	GK	(Scotland) SCO	Callan McKenna	9	0	7+0	0	2+0	0	0+0	0	0+0	0	0+0	0

== Team statistics ==
=== Championship table ===
Pos	Team	Pld	W	D	L	GF	GA	GD	Pts	Promotion, qualification or relegation
6	Dunfermline Athletic	36	11	12	13	43	48	−5	45	
7	Ayr United	36	12	8	16	53	61	−8	44	
8	Queen's Park	36	11	10	15	50	56	−6	43	
9	Inverness Caledonian Thistle (R)	36	10	12	14	41	40	+1	42	Qualification for the Championship play-offs
10	Arbroath (R)	36	6	5	25	35	89	−54	23	Relegation to League One

Rules for classification: 1) Points; 2) Goal difference; 3) Goals scored; 4) Head-to-to head points; 5) Head-to-head goal difference; 6) Play-off (only for deciding promotion, play-off participation and relegation).
(R) Relegated

=== League Cup table ===
Pos	Team	Pld	W	PW	PL	L	GF	GA	GD	Pts	Qualification	MOT	QOS	EFI	QPA	ELG
1	Motherwell	4	3	1	0	0	9	3	+6	11	Qualification for the second round	—	—	3–0	1–0	—
2	Queen of the South	4	2	0	2	0	7	4	+3	8		3–3p	—	0–0p	—	—
3	East Fife	4	1	2	0	1	3	4	−1	7		—	—	—	p0–0	3–1
4	Queen's Park	4	1	0	1	2	6	3	+3	4		—	1–2	—	—	5–0
5	Elgin City	4	0	0	0	4	1	12	−11	0		0–2	0–2	—	—	—

Rules for classification: 1) goal difference, 2) goals scored, 3) away goals scored, 4) matches won, 5) away matches won, 6) drawing of lots.

== Transfers ==
=== Players in ===
Player	From	Fee
(Scotland) Sam Kane	(Scotland) Rangers	Free
(Scotland) Rocco Hickey-Fugaccia	(Scotland) Livingston	Free
(England) Jack Spong	(England) Brighton & Hove Albion	Free
(Republic of Ireland) Ruari Paton	(Scotland) Queen of the South	Free
(England) Jack Turner	(England) Southampton	Free
(England) Will Tizzard	(England) Southampton	Free
(Scotland) Stuart McKinstry	(England) Leeds United	Free
(England) Max Fiddies	(England) Southend United	Free
(Scotland) Sean Welsh	(Scotland) Inverness CT	Free
(Scotland) Callum Haspell	(Scotland) Rothes	Free
(Scotland) Danny Wilson	(United States) Colorado Rapids	Free
(England) Josh Scott	(England) Newcastle United	Free
(England) Josh Hinds	(England) Hull City	Free
(Republic of Ireland) Cillian Sheridan	(Scotland) Inverness CT	Free

=== Players out ===
Player	To	Fee
(Scotland) Calum Biggar	(Scotland) East Kilbride	Free
(Scotland) Jake Davidson	(Scotland) Inverness CT	Free
(Scotland) Max Gillies	(Scotland) East Fife	Free
(Scotland) Lee Kilday	(Scotland) Hamilton Academical	Free
(Scotland) Lewis Moore	(Scotland) Kelty Hearts	Free
(Scotland) Gregor Nicol	(Scotland) East Fife	Free
(Scotland) Callum Yeats	(Scotland) Civil Service Strollers	Free
(Scotland) Liam Brown	(Scotland) East Kilbride	Free
(Nigeria) Stephen Eze	(Vietnam) Quang Nam	Free
(England) Jack Spong	(England) Worthing	Free
(Scotland) Callan McKenna	(England) Bournemouth	£300,000
(England) Josh Hinds	(England) Truro City	Free

=== Loans in ===
Player	From	Fee
(Scotland) Barry Hepburn	(Germany) Bayern Munich II	Loan
(Scotland) Ben McPherson	(Scotland) Celtic	Loan
(Scotland) MacKenzie Carse	(Scotland) Celtic	Loan
(Wales) James Crole	(Wales) Cardiff City	Loan
(Scotland) Jack Willis	(Scotland) St Johnstone	Loan

=== Loans out ===
Player	To	Fee
(Scotland) Jacques Heraghty	(Scotland) The Spartans	Loan
(Scotland) Scott Williamson	(Scotland) Cove Rangers	Loan
(Scotland) Liam Russell	(Scotland) Gartcairn	Loan
(Scotland) Sam Kane	(Scotland) East Kilbride	Loan
(Scotland) Jacques Heraghty	(Scotland) Annan Athletic	Loan
(Scotland) Aaron Healey	(Scotland) Dumbarton	Loan
(Scotland) Archie Graham	(Scotland) Caledonian Braves	Loan

== See also ==
- List of Queen's Park F.C. seasons
