= Seb Drozd =

English footballer (born 2001)

Personal information
- Full name: Sebastian Drozd
- Date of birth: 28 April 2003 (age 23)
- Place of birth: London, England
- Height: 1.80 m (5 ft 11 in)
- Position: Winger

Team information
- Current team: Partick Thistle
- Number: 7

Youth career
- Hemel Hempstead Town
- –2021: Uxbridge
- 2021–2024: Millwall

Senior career*
Years	Team	Apps	(Gls)
2020	Uxbridge	3	(0)
2023	Millwall	0	(0)
2024–2026	Queen's Park	56	(7)
2026–	Partick Thistle	16	(2)
- * Club domestic league appearances and goals as of 18:32, 21 November 2026 (UTC)

Sebastian "Seb" Drozd (born 28 April 2003) is an English professional footballer who plays as a winger for Scottish Championship club Partick Thistle. Born in London to Romanian parents he is eligible for international selection for both the England and Romanian national teams.

== Club career ==
=== Early career in England ===
Drozd began his football career at Hemel Hempstead Town when he was six years old. Drozd then joined Uxbridge, where he started playing professionally at seventeen years old and made three appearances for the side. Drozd was then linked with a move to Chelsea and Arsenal.

In the summer of 2021, Drozd joined Millwall on a two–year contract and was assigned to the development squad. He was quickly became a regular in the club’s development squad. Drozd scored his first goal for Millwall’s development team, in a 2–1 win against Watford’s development team on 2 November 2021. He then scored his second goal for the club’s development team, in a 3–2 loss against Charlton Athletic’s development team on 10 January 2022. At the end of the 2021–22 season, Millwall opted to take up their option of a contract extension that would ensure Drozd remained under contract for the 2022–23 season.

In the 2022–23 season, Drozd continued to be a regular in Millwall’s development squad. He scored twice for the club’s development team, in a 4–0 win against Barnsley’s development team on 16 August 2022. Drozd scored his third goal of the season, in a 4–1 win against Charlton Athletic’s development team on 20 September 2022. On 5 December 2022, he scored twice for Millwall’s development squad, in a 3–3 draw against Ipswich Town’s development team. Drozd scored his sixth goal of the season, in a 4–1 win against Charlton Athletic’s development team on 30 January 2023. On 21 February 2023, he scored his seventh goal of the season, in a 4–2 loss against Cardiff City’s development team. Four days later on 25 February 2023, Drozd was called up to the first team for the first time as an unused substitute, in a 1–0 win against Stoke City. Two days later on 27 February 2023, he scored his eighth goal of the season, in a 2–1 win against Reading’s development team. Drozd scored on 11 April 2023, 18 April 2023 and 25 April 2023 against Swansea City’s development team, Sheffield United and Crewe Alexandra’s development teams respectively. At the end of the 2022–23 season, Drozd signed a contract extension with Millwall for another season.

At the start of the 2023–24 season, Drozd scored his first goal of the season, in a 3–1 win against Burnley’s development team on 21 August 2023. At the end of the 2023–24 season, he was released by the club.

=== Queen’s Park ===
After being released by Millwall, Drozd moved to Scotland sign for Scottish Championship club Queen's Park on 8 October 2024.

Three days later on 11 October 2024, he made his debut for the club, coming on as a 73rd-minute substitute, in a 4–1 win against Annan Athletic in the fourth round of the Scottish Challenge Cup. Since joining Queen’s Park, Drozd became a first team regular, playing in the midfield position. On 2 November 2024, he scored his first goal for Queen’s Park, in a 1–1 draw against Livingston. On 10 February 2025, Drozd came on as a 67th-minute substitute against Rangers in the fifth round of the Scottish Cup and scored two minutes later, in a 1–0 win to advance to the next round. On 30 March 2025, he started the match in the 2025 Scottish Challenge Cup final and played 56 minutes before being substituted, in a 5–0 loss against Livingston. Drozd scored on 26 April 2025 and 2 May 2025 against Ayr United and Raith Rovers respectively. Despite being absent on three separate occasions during the 2024–25 season, he made thirty appearances and scoring four times in all competitions. Following this, Drozd was named the club’s Supporters’ Association Goal of the Season. He then signed a contract extension for another season with Queen’s Park.

In the 2025–26 season, Drozd continued to establish himself in the first team, playing in the midfield position. By October, he began to play in a forward on five occasions throughout the 2025–26 season. On 15 November 2025, Drozd scored his first goal of the season, in a 4–3 loss against St Johnstone. A month later on 16 December 2025, he scored his second goal of the season, in a 2–1 win against Clyde in the second round of the Scottish Challenge Cup. He played a role of setting up two goals to help Queen’s Park beat Airdrieonians 3–0 on 20 December 2025. This was followed up by scoring in the next three matches in the league against Partick Thistle, Raith Rovers and Arbroath. In the quarter–final of the Scottish Challenge Cup against Raith Rovers on 27 January 2026, Drozd set up the equalising goal, leading to penalties, before being one of the players to miss the penalty in a shootout that saw the club knocked out of the tournament. For his performance, Drozd was named Queen’s Park Player of the Month for January. However, he missed the rest of the 2025–26 season, due to injury. At the end of the 2025–26 season, Drozd made forty appearances and scoring five times in all competitions.

=== Partick Thistle ===
Following the expiry of his contract with the Spiders, Drozd signed for fellow Scottish Championship side Partick Thistle in June 2026 on a two-year deal.

Drozd scored on his Thistle debut in a 6–0 home win over Brechin City in a Scottish League Cup group stage tie.

== International career ==
Drozd is eligible to play for England (through his birthplace) and Romania (through his parents). In an interview with Sport.ro in 2022, he expressed interest in a call-up to the Romanian national team.

== Personal life ==
Drozd was born in England to Romanian parents. His family took him to their home country every year growing up and he speaks both English and Romanian.

== Honours ==
Queen's Park

- Scottish Challenge Cup runner-up: 2024–25

Individual

- Queen's Park Supporters’ Association Goal of the Season: 2024–25
