= McStravick =

McStravick is a surname. Notable people with the surname include:

- Bradley McStravick (1956–2024), British decathlete
- Liam McStravick (born 2004), Northern Irish footballer
- Ronan McStravick (born 1991), AI Coach
