= John Higgins (footballer, born 1933) =

Scottish footballer

John Higgins (7 January 1933 – 1994) was a Scottish footballer who played for Celtic in the 1950s. He played for the Scottish Football League XI once.

After his playing career ended, Higgins worked as a coach at Celtic between 1961 and 1967. He became then the club's Chief Scout in 1967, and was involved in developing links between Celtic and the recently established Celtic Boys Club.
