= Jack Turner (footballer, born 2002) =

English footballer, (born 2002)

Personal information
- Full name: Jack Turner
- Date of birth: 7 September 2002 (age 24)
- Position: Midfielder

Team information
- Current team: Ross County

Youth career
- –2023: Southampton

Senior career*
Years	Team	Apps	(Gls)
2023	Southampton	0	(0)
2023	→ Braintree Town (loan)	16	(2)
2023–2025	Queen's Park	70	(12)
2025–2026	Woking	29	(4)
2026–	Ross County	14	(0)
- * Club domestic league appearances and goals as of 06:01, 11 November 2026 (UTC)

Jack Turner (born 7 September 2002) is an English professional footballer who plays as a midfielder for Scottish League One club Ross County.

== Club career ==
On 6 July 2021, Turner signed his first professional contract with Southampton. Ahead of an FA Cup fourth round tie against Coventry City in February 2022, he was promoted to the senior team alongside Kazeem Olaigbe and Thierry Small. On 31 January 2023, Turner joined National League South club Braintree Town on loan for the remainder of the season. He was released by Southampton at the end of the 2022–23 season.

On 27 June 2023, Turner joined Scottish Championship side Queen's Park on a three-year contract. He made his debut for the club on 15 July 2023 in a 0–0 draw with East Fife in the Scottish League Cup, with East Fife winning 4–2 on penalties. On 2 September 2023, Turner scored his first goal for the club in a 3–2 defeat to Raith Rovers. On 30 May 2025, Queen's Park announced that Turner would depart the club at the end of the season.

On 12 June 2025, it was announced Turner would be joining National League side Woking for the following season. On 7 May 2026, it was announced that Turner would leave the club at the end of his contract in June.

On 5 June 2026, Turner agreed to return to Scotland, joining Ross County.

== Career statistics ==
=== Club ===
As of match played 7 November 2026

Appearances and goals by club, season and competition
Club	Season	League			National Cup		League Cup		Other		Total	
Club	Season	Division	Apps	Goals	Apps	Goals	Apps	Goals	Apps	Goals	Apps	Goals
Southampton U21	2019–20	—			—		—		1 (Note: Appearances in EFL Trophy)	0	1	0
Southampton U21	2021–22	—			—		—		1	0	1	0
Southampton U21	2022–23	—			—		—		3	0	3	0
Southampton U21	Total		—		—		—		5	0	5	0
Braintree Town (loan)	2022–23	National League South	16	2	0	0	—		—		16	2
Queen's Park	2023–24	Scottish Championship	36	6	1	0	4	0	2 (Note: Appearances in Scottish Challenge Cup)	1	43	7
Queen's Park	2024–25	Scottish Championship	34	6	4	0	5	3	4	2	47	11
Queen's Park	Total		70	12	5	0	9	3	6	3	90	18
Woking	2025–26	National League	29	4	2	0	—		8 (Note: Four appearances in National League Cup, four appearances in FA Trophy)	1	38	5
Ross County	2026–27	Scottish League One	14	0	0	0	6	1	5	1	25	2
Career total			129	18	7	0	15	4	24	5	174	27

== Honours ==
Queen's Park

- Scottish Challenge Cup runner-up: 2024–25
