= 2016 Scottish Challenge Cup final =

- Event: 2015–16 Scottish Challenge Cup
Rangers	Peterhead
4	0
- Date: 10 April 2016
- Venue: Hampden Park, Glasgow
- Referee: George Salmond
- Attendance: 48,133

The 2016 Scottish Challenge Cup final, also known as the Petrofac Training Cup final for sponsorship reasons, is a football match that took place on 10 April 2016 at Hampden Park, between Rangers and Peterhead. Rangers won the match by 4 goals to nil. It was the 25th final of the Scottish Challenge Cup since it was first organised in 1990 to celebrate the centenary of the now defunct Scottish Football League and the third Challenge Cup final since the SPFL was formed. Both teams progressed through four elimination rounds to reach the final.

== Route to the final ==
The competition is a knock-out tournament and in 2015–16 was contested by 32 teams. Those participating were the 30 clubs that played in the Championship, League One and League Two of the Scottish Professional Football League, while the winners of the Highland League (Brora Rangers) and the Lowland Football League (Edinburgh City) were also invited. For the first and second rounds only, the draw was divided into two geographical regions – north and south. Teams were paired at random and the winner of each match progressed to the next round and the loser was eliminated.

=== Rangers ===
Round	Opposition	Score
First round	Hibernian (a)	6–2
Second round	Ayr United (a)	2–0
Quarter-final	Livingston (h)	1–0
Semi-final	St Mirren (h)	4–0

=== Peterhead ===
Round	Opposition	Score
First round	Brechin City (a)	3–0
Second round	Falkirk (a)	5–3
Quarter-final	Stenhousemuir (h)	3–0
Semi-final	Queen's Park (a)	2–1

== Match details ==
10 April 2016
15:00

Rangers	4 – 0	Peterhead
Gilchrist 17' (o.g.); Tavernier 40'; Halliday 85' (pen.); Miller 89'	BBC Sport

Hampden Park, Glasgow
Attendance: 48,133
Referee: George Salmond

Rangers	Peterhead

RANGERS:
GK	25	(England) Wes Foderingham
RB	2	(England) James Tavernier
CB	27	(Scotland) Danny Wilson	(yellow card) 54'
CB	4	(Republic of Ireland) Rob Kiernan
LB	5	(Scotland) Lee Wallace (c)		(substituted off) 67'
DM	6	(England) Dominic Ball
CM	23	(Scotland) Jason Holt
CM	16	(Scotland) Andy Halliday
RW	19	(Scotland) Barrie McKay		(substituted off) 78'
CF	9	(Scotland) Kenny Miller
LW	15	(England) Harry Forrester		(substituted off) 67'
Substitutes:
GK	1	(Scotland) Cammy Bell
MF	8	(United States) Gedion Zelalem
MF	17	(Scotland) Billy King		(substituted on) 67'
MF	22	(Northern Ireland) Dean Shiels		(substituted on) 78'
MF	7	(England) Nicky Law
FW	14	(Scotland) Nicky Clark
FW	29	(Scotland) Michael O'Halloran		(substituted on) 67'
Manager:
(England) Mark Warburton

PETERHEAD:
GK	1	(Scotland) Graeme Smith
RB	6	(Scotland) Ryan Strachan		(substituted off) 26'
CB	4	(Scotland) Scott Ross	(yellow card) 49'
CB	5	(Scotland) Ally Gilchrist
LB	3	(Scotland) Steven Noble (c)
RM	8	(Scotland) Jamie Redman		(substituted off) 64'
CM	22	(Scotland) Simon Ferry
CM	14	(United States) Kevin Dzierzawski	(yellow card) 68'
LM	18	(Scotland) Jordon Brown
CF	9	(Scotland) Rory McAllister
CF	10	(Scotland) Shane Sutherland		(substituted off) 58'
Substitutes:
GK	21	(Scotland) Paul Jarvie
DF	2	(Scotland) Nathan Blockley
MF	17	(Scotland) Scott Ferries
MF	7	(Scotland) Jamie Stevenson		(substituted on) 26'
MF	11	(Scotland) Nicky Riley	(yellow card) 90+1'	(substituted on) 58'
FW	20	(Scotland) Andy Rodgers
FW	15	(Scotland) Leighton McIntosh		(substituted on) 64'
Manager:
(Scotland) Jim McInally

Match officials

- Referee: George Salmond
- Assistant referees:
  - Anthony Cooper
  - Gordon Crawford
- Fourth official: Don Robertson

Match rules

- 90 minutes.
- 30 minutes of extra-time if necessary.
- Penalty shoot-out if scores still level.
- Five named substitutes.
- Maximum of three substitutions.
