= Tony Gallagher (footballer) =

Scottish footballer

Personal information
- Full name: Anthony Gallagher
- Date of birth: 16 March 1963 (age 63)
- Place of birth: Bellshill, Scotland
- Position: Defender

Youth career
- Celtic Boys Club

Senior career*
Years	Team	Apps	(Gls)
- East Kilbride Thistle
1982–1988	Albion Rovers	133	(16)
1988–1997	Stranraer	209	(17)
- Baillieston Juniors
- * Club domestic league appearances and goals

Anthony Gallagher (born 16 March 1963) is a Scottish former footballer who played for Albion Rovers and Stranraer.

== Playing career ==
=== Early career ===
Born in Bellshill, Gallagher grew up in East Kilbride and was a boyhood Celtic supporter. He played for Celtic Boys Club, becoming captain at under-13 level. He was the first captain to win the Scottish Cup at the under-13 level. He was injured at Celtic, and decided to move on, playing for junior team East Kilbride Thistle, winning the Scottish Junior Cup in May 1983 when they beat Bo'ness United at Ibrox Stadium.

=== Stranraer ===
Gallagher played with Stranraer for 10 years, during which time he captained the team and helped them win the Scottish Second Division title (1994) and the Scottish Challenge Cup in 1996. He was awarded a testimonial match against Rangers at Stair Park on 20 July 1997.

== Coaching ==
After dropping back into playing in Junior football, Gallagher went on to have spells coaching at Cumnock, Baillieston and Auchinleck Talbot. He then joined East Kilbride YM in 2002. Gallagher spent over eight years there before becoming assistant manager at East Kilbride Thistle, the club he had played for in the 1980s, in 2010. Gallagher resigned in June 2012, along with manager Jimmy Kerr, after the club were relegated from the Junior Super League first division.
