= Will Tizzard =

English footballer

Personal information
- Full name: William James Tizzard
- Date of birth: 5 November 2002 (age 24)
- Place of birth: Bristol, England
- Position: Centre-back

Team information
- Current team: Ebbsfleet United

Youth career
- –2023: Southampton

Senior career*
Years	Team	Apps	(Gls)
2022–2023	Southampton	0	(0)
2022–2023	→ Chippenham Town (loan)	22	(1)
2023–2025	Queen's Park	49	(0)
2025–2026	Sutton United	18	(2)
2026	→ Torquay United (loan)	12	(0)
2026–	Ebbsfleet United	14	(0)
- * Club domestic league appearances and goals as of 06:02, 11 November 2026 (UTC)

William James Tizzard (born 5 November 2002) is an English professional footballer who plays as a centre-back for National League South club Ebbsfleet United.

== Club career ==
At the end of the 2020–21 season, Tizzard was awarded Scholar of the Year at Southampton. In July 2021, he signed his first professional contract with Southampton. On 31 August 2022, Tizzard joined National League South club Chippenham Town on loan until January 2023. He rejoined Chippenham Town on loan in January 2023 for the remainder of the 2022–23 season. He was released by Southampton at the end of the 2022–23 season.

On 28 June 2023, Tizzard joined Scottish Championship side Queen's Park on a three-year contract. He made his debut for the club on 15 July 2023 in a 0–0 draw with East Fife in the Scottish League Cup, with East Fife winning 4–2 on penalties. On 2 September 2023, Tizzard was given a red card during a 3–2 defeat to Raith Rovers for a foul on Jack Hamilton. An appeal into the dismissal was unsuccessful. On 30 May 2025, Queen's Park announced that Tizzard would depart the club at the end of the season.

On 12 June 2025, Tizzard joined National League side Sutton United. On 27 February 2026, he joined National League South side Torquay United on a 28-day loan.

On 17 June 2026, Tizzard joined National League South club Ebbsfleet United.

== Career statistics ==
=== Club ===
As of match played 9 November 2026

Appearances and goals by club, season and competition
Club	Season	League			National Cup		League Cup		Other		Total	
Club	Season	Division	Apps	Goals	Apps	Goals	Apps	Goals	Apps	Goals	Apps	Goals
Southampton U21	2022–23	—			—		—		1 (Note: Appearances in EFL Trophy)	0	1	0
Chippenham Town (loan)	2022–23	National League South	22	1	3	0	—		1 (Note: Appearances in FA Trophy)	0	26	1
Queen's Park	2023–24	Scottish Championship	21	0	0	0	4	0	0	0	25	0
Queen's Park	2024–25	Scottish Championship	28	0	4	0	3	0	4 (Note: Appearances in Scottish Challenge Cup)	0	39	0
Queen's Park	Total		49	0	4	0	7	0	4	0	64	0
Sutton United	2025–26	National League	18	2	1	0	—		0	0	19	2
Torquay United (loan)	2025–26	National League South	12	0	0	0	—		2 (Note: Appearances in National League South play-offs)	0	14	0
Ebbsfleet United	2026–27	National League South	14	0	0	0	—		0	0	14	0
Career total			115	3	8	0	7	0	8	0	138	3

== Honours ==
Queen's Park

- Scottish Challenge Cup runner-up: 2024–25
