= John Traynor (footballer) =

Scottish footballer

Personal information
- Date of birth: 10 December 1966 (age 59)
- Place of birth: Glasgow, Scotland
- Position: Defender

Youth career
- Celtic Boys Club

Senior career*
Years	Team	Apps	(Gls)
1988–1989	Celtic	4	(0)
1989–1991	Clydebank	36	(1)
1991–2000	Ayr United	237	(20)
- Auchinleck Talbot
Total		277	(21)
- * Club domestic league appearances and goals

John Traynor (born 10 December 1966) is a Scottish former professional footballer who played as a defender.

== Career ==
Born in Glasgow, Traynor played for Celtic Boys Club, Celtic, Clydebank, Ayr United and Auchinleck Talbot. After retiring as a professional, Ayr United gave Traynor a testimonial match against Newcastle United.
