= 2024 Scottish Challenge Cup final =

- Event: 2023–24 Scottish Challenge Cup
The New Saints	Airdrieonians
(Wales)	(Scotland)
1	2
- Date: 24 March 2024
- Venue: Falkirk Stadium, Falkirk
- Referee: Matthew MacDermid
- Attendance: 3,191

The 2024 Scottish Challenge Cup final, also known as the SPFL Trust Trophy final for sponsorship reasons, was a football match on 24 March 2024 between the Cymru Premier club The New Saints and the Scottish Championship side Airdrieonians. It was the 31st final of the Scottish Challenge Cup since it was first organised in 1990 to celebrate the centenary of the now defunct Scottish Football League, and the ninth since the SPFL was formed. It was played at Falkirk Stadium. It would subsequently be the last Scottish Challenge Cup final to feature a non-Scottish team due to them no longer being invited the following season.

== Route to the final ==
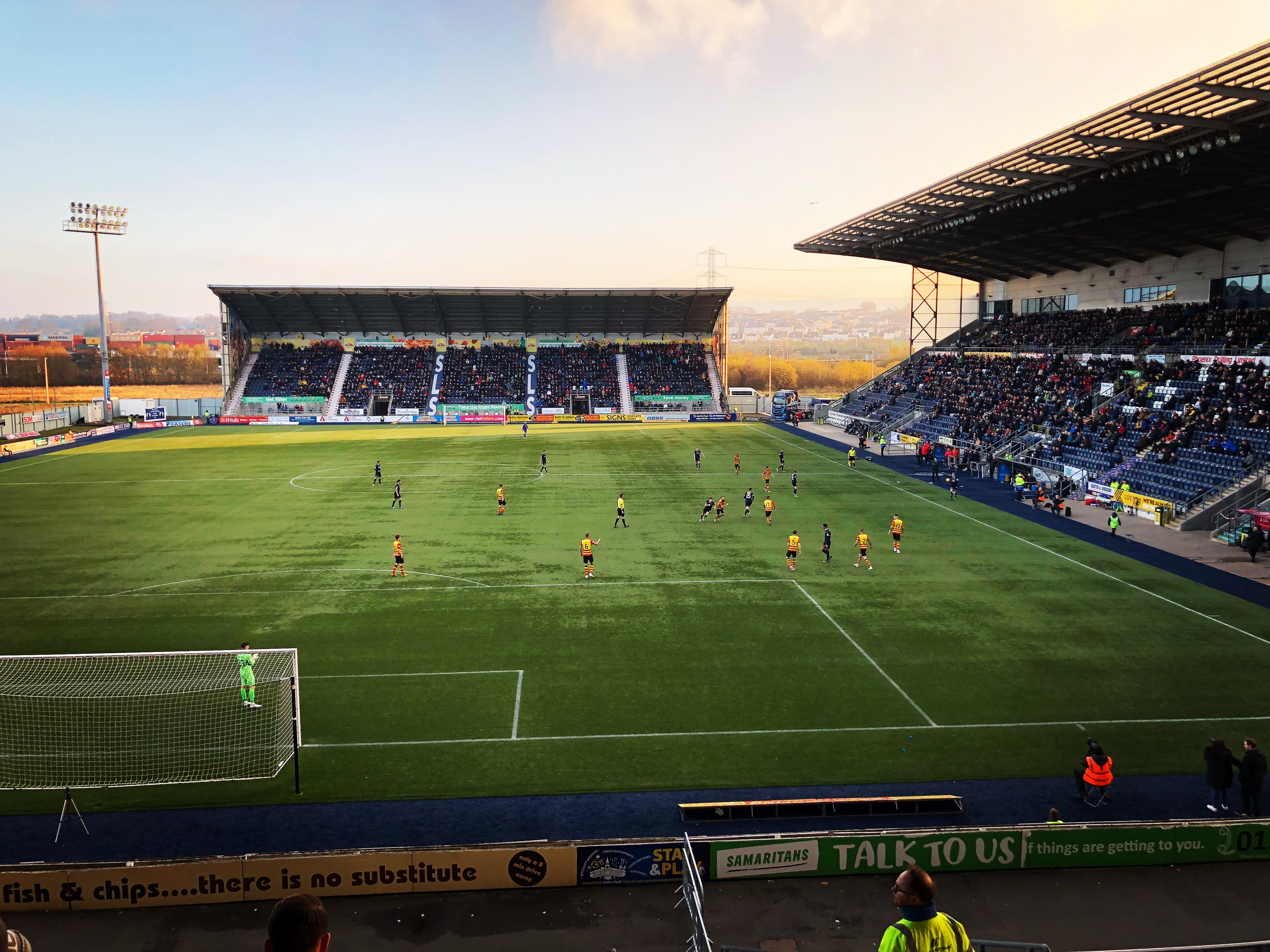
The final took place at the Falkirk Stadium (pictured in 2018)

=== The New Saints ===
The New Saints (TNS), as an invited team representing the Cymru Premier, started in the Third Round where they were drawn away at Hibernian B where they won 3–0 at Meadowbank Stadium. In the next round they played East Fife at home. At their Park Hall, TNS progressed after winning 5–4 on penalties after a 2–2 draw. In the quarter-finals, they overcame Arbroath 4–1 at Park Hall. In the semi-finals, they played Falkirk away at Falkirk Stadium. TNS won 1–0 becoming the second Welsh team to reach the final after Connah's Quay Nomads in 2019.^{A} TNS also entered this match looking to match the world record for consecutive wins in all competitions.

Round	Opposition	Score
Third round	Hibernian B (a)	3–0
Fourth round	East Fife (h)	2–2 (a.e.t.); 5–4 (p)
Quarter-final	Arbroath (h)	4–1
Semi-final	Falkirk (a)	1–0

=== Airdrieonians ===
Airdrieonians also started in the Third Round away at the University of Stirling and won 3–2 at Forthbank Stadium. In the next round they played away against Rangers B and progressed after a 4–2 win at Cappielow. They then faced Greenock Morton at Cappielow and won 6–5 on penalties after a 0–0 draw. In the semi-finals they played away at Raith Rovers and progressed to the final after a 1–0 win at Stark's Park.

Round	Opposition	Score
Third round	University of Stirling (a)	3–2
Fourth round	Rangers B (a)	4–2
Quarter-final	Greenock Morton (a)	0–0 (a.e.t.); 6–5 (p)
Semi-final	Raith Rovers (a)	1–0

== Match details ==
24 March 2024
16:15 GMT
Final

The New Saints (Wales)	1–2	Airdrieonians
Clark 12'	Report	McStravick 22'; Todorov 67' (pen.)

Falkirk Stadium, Falkirk
Attendance: 3,191
Referee: Matthew MacDermid

The New Saints	Airdrieonians

GK	25	(Wales) Connor Roberts
RB	7	(Republic of Ireland) Josh Daniels
CB	22	(Wales) Danny Davies
CB	2	(England) Josh Pask
LB	3	(Wales) Chris Marriott
CM	19	(Wales) Ben Clark (substituted off) 74'
CM	21	(Wales) Leo Smith (substituted off) 90'
CM	10	(England) Daniel Redmond (substituted off) 74'
RW	18	(Northern Ireland) Rory Holden (substituted off) 79'
FW	23	(England) Brad Young
RW	17	(England) Jordan Williams (substituted off) 78'
Substitutes:
GK	1	(England) Reece Thompson
DF	12	(England) Blaine Hudson
DF	26	(England) Jordan Marshall (substituted in) 79'
MF	8	(Northern Ireland) Ryan Brobbel (substituted in) 90'
MF	14	(Wales) Dan Williams (substituted in) 74'
MF	15	(England) Jared Harlock
FW	9	(Scotland) Declan McManus (substituted in) 74'
FW	11	(Poland) Adrian Cieślewicz (substituted in) 78'
FW	39	(England) Tom Jones
Manager:
(England) Craig Harrison

- Man of the match: Nikolay Todorov (Airdrieonians)

GK	40	(Scotland) Robbie Hemfrey
RB	2	(Scotland) Cammy Ballantyne
CB	16	(Scotland) Craig Watson
CB	6	(Scotland) Callum Fordyce
LB	5	(England) Mason Hancock
CDM	4	(Scotland) Rhys McCabe (substituted off) 45'
RM	28	(Scotland) Gavin Gallagher (yellow card) (substituted off) 54'
CM	10	(Scotland) Adam Frizzell
LM	21	(Scotland) Charlie Telfer
AM	12	(Northern Ireland) Liam McStravick (yellow card) (substituted off) 61'
FW	11	(Bulgaria) Nikolay Todorov (substituted off) 90+3'
Substitutes:
GK	43	(Scotland) David Hutton
DF	3	(Antigua and Barbuda) Aaron Taylor-Sinclair
MF	8	(Scotland) Lewis McGregor
MF	14	(Scotland) Dean McMaster (substituted in) 45'
MF	19	(Scotland) Elliot Dunlop
MF	26	(Australia) Chris Donnell (substituted in) 61'
FW	7	(Scotland) Josh O'Connor (substituted in) 54'
FW	9	(Scotland) Calum Gallagher (substituted in) 90+3'
FW	23	(Scotland) Gabby McGill
Manager:
(Scotland) Rhys McCabe

Match rules

- 90 minutes.
- 30 minutes of extra-time if necessary.
- Penalty shoot-out if scores still level.

== Notes ==
- ^A TNS are based in Oswestry, England but play in the Welsh Cymru Premier
