= McCarrison =

McCarrison is a surname. Notable people with the surname include:

- Dugald McCarrison (born 1969), Scottish footballer
- Robert McCarrison (1878–1960), Northern Irish physician and nutritionist
