= 1996–97 Scottish Challenge Cup =

Tournament details
- Country: Scotland
- Teams: 30

Final positions
- Champions: Stranraer
- Runners-up: St Johnstone

Tournament statistics
- Matches played: 29
- Goals scored: 89 (3.07 per match)

The 1996–97 Scottish Challenge Cup was the seventh season of the competition, competed for by the 30 member clubs of the Scottish Football League. The defending champions were Stenhousemuir, who defeated Dundee United 5–4 on penalties after a 0–0 draw after extra time in the 1995 final; and lost 3–0 to Dundee in the First round.

The final was played on 3 November 1996, between Stranraer and St Johnstone at Broadwood Stadium in Cumbernauld. Stranraer won 1–0 courtesy of an own goal, to win the tournament for the first time.

== Schedule ==
Round	First match date	Fixtures	Clubs
First round	Thu/Sat 8/10 August 1996	14	30 → 16
Second round	Mon/Tue/Wed 26/27/28 August 1996	8	16 → 8
Quarter-finals	Tuesday 10 September 1996	4	8 → 4
Semi-finals	Wed/Tue 2/8 October 1996	2	4 → 2
Final	Sunday 3 November 1996	1	2 → 1

== First round ==
Airdrieonians and East Fife received random byes into the second round.

8 August 1996	Dundee	3–0	Stenhousemuir	Dens Park, Dundee

8 August 1996	Hamilton Academical	2–1	St Mirren	Firhill Stadium, Glasgow

10 August 1996	Albion Rovers	1 – 2 (a.e.t.)	St Johnstone	Cliftonhill, Coatbridge

10 August 1996	Alloa Athletic	3 – 3* (a.e.t.)	Clyde	Recreation Park, Alloa
			Clyde won on penalties

10 August 1996	Arbroath	2 – 3 (a.e.t.)	Queen of the South	Gayfield Park, Arbroath

10 August 1996	Berwick Rangers	0–2	Stranraer	Shielfield Park, Berwick-upon-Tweed

10 August 1996	Brechin City	0 – 0* (a.e.t.)	Stirling Albion	Glebe Park, Brechin
			Stirling Albion won on penalties

10 August 1996	Clydebank	0 – 0* (a.e.t.)	East Stirlingshire	Kilbowie Park, Clydebank
			East Stirlingshire won on penalties

10 August 1996	Cowdenbeath	0 – 2 (a.e.t.)	Falkirk	Central Park, Cowdenbeath

10 August 1996	Forfar Athletic	0–4	Greenock Morton	Station Park, Forfar

10 August 1996	Livingston	1–2	Inverness Caledonian Thistle	Almondvale Stadium, Livingston

10 August 1996	Montrose	2–0	Dumbarton	Links Park, Montrose

10 August 1996	Partick Thistle	3 – 1 (a.e.t.)	Queen's Park	Firhill Stadium, Glasgow

10 August 1996	Ross County	0–4	Ayr United	Victoria Park, Dingwall

Source: SFL

== Second round ==
26 August 1996	Ayr United	0–4	St Johnstone	Somerset Park, Ayr

27 August 1996	Airdrieonians	0–2	Dundee	Broadwood Stadium, Cumbernauld

27 August 1996	East Fife	2–0	Falkirk	Bayview Park, Methil

27 August 1996	Montrose	2–1	East Stirlingshire	Links Park, Montrose

27 August 1996	Greenock Morton	2–1	Queen of the South	Cappielow, Greenock

27 August 1996	Partick Thistle	2–1	Hamilton Academical	Firhill Stadium, Glasgow

27 August 1996	Stirling Albion	3–1	Inverness Caledonian Thistle	Forthbank Stadium, Stirling

28 August 1996	Stranraer	2–1	Clyde	Stair Park, Stranraer

Source: SFL

== Quarter-finals ==
10 September 1996

Dundee	1–5	St Johnstone

Dens Park, Dundee

10 September 1996

East Fife	0–1	Stranraer

Bayview Park, Methil

10 September 1996

Greenock Morton	2–1	Partick Thistle

Cappielow, Greenock

10 September 1996

Stirling Albion	1–3	Montrose

Forthbank Stadium, Stirling

== Semi-finals ==
2 October 1996

Stranraer	3–0	Greenock Morton

Stair Park, Stranraer

8 October 1996

St Johnstone	4–2	Montrose

McDiarmid Park, Perth

== Final ==
3 November 1996
15:00

Stranraer	1–0	St Johnstone
Griffin (o.g.)	Report

Broadwood Stadium, Cumbernauld
Attendance: 5,522
Referee: Kenny Clark
