= Jadan Raymond =

Welsh footballer (born 2003)

Personal information
- Full name: Jadan Raymond
- Date of birth: 15 October 2003 (age 23)
- Place of birth: Croydon, England
- Position: Attacking midfielder

Team information
- Current team: Croydon Athletic

Youth career
- 2018–2022: Crystal Palace

Senior career*
Years	Team	Apps	(Gls)
2022–2025	Crystal Palace	0	(0)
2025	→ Queen's Park (loan)	5	(0)
2025–2026	Dulwich Hamlet	0	(0)
2026–	Croydon Athletic	0	(0)

International career
2019	England U16	4	(0)
2019	England U17	4	(0)
2020	Wales U18		
2021	Wales U19	2	(0)
- * Club domestic league appearances and goals as of 14:25, 29 November 2025 (UTC)

Jadan Raymond (born 15 October 2003) is a professional footballer who plays as an attacking midfielder for Isthmian League Premier Division club Dulwich Hamlet. He has played youth international football for England and Wales.

== Club career ==
Raymond joined Crystal Palace at the age of eight years-old and signed professional terms with the club in October 2020. He featured in a Crystal Palace match day squad in the Premier League for the first time in October 2023, but was an unused substitute for their 0-0 draw against Nottingham Forest.

Raymond had a trial for Swindon Town in January 2025, but the move fell through after Swindon had to move resources to cover injuries in other positions in their team. He signed for Scottish Championship club Queen's Park the following month on loan for the rest of the 2024–25 season. Crystal Palace announced his release at the end of the season.

In November 2025, Raymond joined Isthmian League Premier Division club Dulwich Hamlet.

In October 2026, Raymond joined Isthmian League South East Division club Croydon Athletic.

== Style of play ==
He is described as an attacking midfielder who can play anywhere behind the striker.

== International career ==
Raymond has played at under-17 level for England in 2019. He represented Wales at under-18 level in the Victory Shield in 2020. Raymond continued with Wales at under-19 and under-21 level.

== Career statistics ==
As of 10 June 2025

Appearances and goals by club, season and competition
Club	Season	League			National Cup		League Cup		Other		Total	
Club	Season	Division	Apps	Goals	Apps	Goals	Apps	Goals	Apps	Goals	Apps	Goals
Crystal Palace	2022–23	Premier League	0	0	0	0	0	0	—		0	0
Crystal Palace	2023–24	Premier League	0	0	0	0	0	0	—		0	0
Crystal Palace	2024–25	Premier League	0	0	0	0	0	0	—		0	0
Crystal Palace	Total		0	0	0	0	0	0	—		0	0
Queen's Park (loan)	2024–25	Scottish Championship	5	0	1	0	0	0	—		6	0
Career total			5	0	1	0	0	0	0	0	6	0

== Honours ==
Queen's Park

- Scottish Challenge Cup runner-up: 2024–25
