= Liam McStravick =

Northern Irish footballer (born 2004)

Personal information
- Date of birth: 27 November 2004 (age 21)
- Place of birth: Belfast, Northern Ireland
- Height: 1.69 m (5 ft 7 in)
- Position: Midfielder

Team information
- Current team: Cliftonville
- Number: 27

Youth career
- –2022: Cliftonville

Senior career*
Years	Team	Apps	(Gls)
2022–2023	Linfield	57	(1)
2023–2026	Airdrieonians	46	(3)
2026–	Cliftonville	18	(3)

International career
- Northern Ireland U18
2023–	Northern Ireland U21		
- * Club domestic league appearances and goals as of 29 April 2026

Liam McStravick (born 27 November 2004) is a Northern Irish footballer who plays for the NIFL Premiership club Cliftonville as a midfielder. He was born in Belfast.

== Career ==
McStravick was born in Belfast, Northern Ireland. He started playing youth football with Cliftonville under the mentorship of the former Northern Ireland youth international Marc Smyth. In 2022, he joined Linfield and signed his first professional contract. In 2023, he moved to sign for Airdrieonians in Scotland for an undisclosed amount. He scored his first professional goal in November 2023 against Arbroath. In 2024, McStravick scored the equalising goal for Airdrieonians against The New Saints in the 2024 Scottish Challenge Cup final, which Airdrieonians won to give him his first senior medal.

However, McStravick suffered an anterior cruciate ligament injury during the match against The New Saints. Due to the nature of his injury requiring surgery, Airdrieonians permitted him to return to Northern Ireland to undergo rehabilitation with the physio of Larne. He later returned to Scotland to take part in Airdrieonians' social programmes in February 2025. He returned to playing in March 2025, coming off the bench and scoring an equaliser against Livingstone. In 2026, he was signed by Cliftonville.

=== International career ===
During his youth career, he was called up to play for Northern Ireland national under-18 schoolboys football team. In October 2023, he was called up to the Northern Ireland national under-21 football team. After returning from his ACL injury, he was recalled to Northern Ireland U-21s.

== Honours ==
- 2023–24 Scottish Challenge Cup
