= 2015 Scottish Challenge Cup final =

- Event: 2014–15 Scottish Challenge Cup
Livingston	Alloa Athletic
4	0
- Date: 5 April 2015
- Venue: McDiarmid Park, Perth
- Referee: John Beaton
- Attendance: 2,869

The 2015 Scottish Challenge Cup final, also known as the Petrofac Training Cup final for sponsorship reasons, was a football match that took place at McDiarmid Park on 5 April 2015, between Livingston and Alloa Athletic. The match was televised by BBC ALBA. It was the 24th final of the Scottish Challenge Cup since it was first organised in 1990 to celebrate the centenary of the now defunct Scottish Football League, it is the second Challenge Cup Final since the SPFL was formed. Both teams progressed through four elimination rounds to reach the final.

== Route to the final ==
The competition is a knock-out tournament and in 2014–15 was contested by 32 teams. Those participating were the 30 clubs that played in the Championship, League One and League Two of the Scottish Professional Football League, while the winners of the Highland League (Brora Rangers) and the Lowland Football League (Spartans) were also invited. For the first and second rounds only, the draw was divided into two geographical regions – north/east and south/west. Teams were paired at random and the winner of each match progressed to the next round and the loser was eliminated.

=== Livingston ===
Round	Opposition	Score
First round	Queen of the South (a)	4–3 (a.e.t.)
Second round	Heart of Midlothian (h)	4–1
Quarter-final	Peterhead (a)	1–0 (a.e.t.)
Semi-final	Stranraer (h)	1–1 (a.e.t.) (5–4 pens.)

=== Alloa Athletic ===
Round	Opposition	Score
First round	Arbroath (a)	4–1
Second round	Stirling Albion (a)	2–1
Quarter-final	Greenock Morton (a)	1–0
Semi-final	Rangers (h)	3–2

== Match details ==
5 April 2015
16:05

Livingston	4 – 0	Alloa Athletic
Pittman 21'; Fordyce 61'; White 86', 90'	Report

McDiarmid Park, Perth, Scotland
Attendance: 2,869
Referee: John Beaton

Livingston	Alloa Athletic

Match officials

- Assistant referees:
  - Brian Templeton
  - John McCrossan
- Fourth official: Barry Cook

Match rules

- 90 minutes.
- 30 minutes of extra-time if necessary.
- Penalty shoot-out if scores still level.
- Five named substitutes.
- Maximum of three substitutions.
