= Barney Duffy =

Scottish footballer (1898–1978)

Personal information
- Full name: Bernard Duffy
- Date of birth: 9 February 1898
- Place of birth: Burnbank, Scotland
- Date of death: 1978 (aged 79–80)
- Position: Half-back

Senior career*
Years	Team	Apps	(Gls)
1920–1921	Blantyre Caledonians		
1921–1922	Burnbank		
1922–1923	Bellshill Athletic		
1923–1927	Chelsea	3	(0)
1927–1929	Clapton Orient	70	(1)
1930–1931	Ards		
1931–1932	Shelbourne		
1932–1933	Dundalk		
Total		73	(1)
- * Club domestic league appearances and goals

Bernard Duffy (9 February 1898 – 1978) was a Scottish footballer who played in the Football League for Chelsea and Clapton Orient.
