= Peter Fyhr =

Swedish footballer

Personal information
- Date of birth: 27 June 1969 (age 57)
- Place of birth: Sweden
- Position: Striker

Senior career*
| Years | Team | Apps | (Gls) |
- Gefle IF
| 1996–1997 | St Johnstone | 4 | (0) |
| 1997–1999 | IFK Norrköping | 43 | (10) |
| Total | | 47+ | (10+) |
- * Club domestic league appearances and goals

Peter Fyhr (born 27 June 1969) is a Swedish former professional footballer who played as a striker.

== Career ==
Fyhr played in his native Sweden for teams including Gefle IF and IFK Norrköping, and also spent the 1996–97 season with Scottish team St Johnstone, making four appearances in the Scottish Football League for them that season.

In June 1999, readers of magazine FourFourTwo voted Fyhr as St Johnstone's worst-ever player.
