= Andy Whiteford =

Scottish footballer and manager

Personal information
- Full name: Andrew Whiteford
- Date of birth: 22 August 1977 (age 49)
- Place of birth: Scotland
- Position: Defender

Team information
- Current team: Neilston (manager)

Youth career
- 19??–1994: Possil YMCA

Senior career*
Years	Team	Apps	(Gls)
1994–2000	St Johnstone	17	(0)
1999–2000	→ Stirling Albion (loan)	20	(1)
2000–2001	Stirling Albion	10	(0)
2001–2002	Clydebank	14	(0)
2002–2003	Neilston Juniors		
2003–2004	Hamilton Academical	17	(2)
2004–????	Neilston Juniors		
Total		78	(3)

International career
1997	Scotland under-21	1	(0)

Managerial career
- 2023–: Neilston
- * Club domestic league appearances and goals

Andrew Whiteford (born 22 August 1977) is a Scottish professional footballer and manager.

A defender, Whiteford began his career with St Johnstone in 1994 after progressing through the McDiarmid Park youth ranks. In six years as a professional with the Perth club he made seventeen league appearances.

Whiteford went on loan to Stirling Albion during the 1999-2000 season, and he made the move permanent in 2000. In total, he made 30 league appearances for Albion, scoring one goal.

In 2001, he joined Clydebank, for whom he made fourteen appearances in two years.

His most recent club, between 2003 and 2004, was Hamilton Academical. He made seventeen appearances and scored two goals for the Accies.

Whiteford was appointed manager of Neilston in November 2023, having previously held the role on an interim basis.
