= Rocco Hickey-Fugaccia =

Scottish footballer

Personal information
- Full name: Rocco Hickey-Fugaccia
- Date of birth: 4 May 2005 (age 21)
- Place of birth: Giffnock, Scotland
- Height: 1.75 m (5 ft 9 in)
- Position: Midfielder

Team information
- Current team: Forfar
- Number: 24

Youth career
- Giffnock North
- –2018: Grassroots Boys Club
- 2018–2021: Hamilton Academical
- Drumchapel United

Senior career*
Years	Team	Apps	(Gls)
2022–2023	Livingston	0	(0)
2023	→ Broxburn Athletic (loan)		
2024–2025	Queen's Park	20	(0)
2025–2026	Arbroath	1	(0)
2025	→ Clydebank (loan)	6	(0)
2026	Elgin City	14	(0)
2026–	Forfar	0	(0)
- * Club domestic league appearances and goals as of 4 May 2026

Rocco Hickey-Fugaccia (born 4 May 2005) is a Scottish professional footballer who plays as a midfielder for Forfar.

== Early life ==
His father is of Irish descent, and his mother of Italian ancestry. He attended St Ninian's High School.

== Club career ==
Hickey-Fugaccia started his pro-youth career in the academy of Hamilton Academical. He later had short spells with Drumchapel United and Livingston.

In June 2023, he signed for Queen's Park. The midfielder made his league debut for the Spiders at home against Ayr United on 21 September 2024, coming on as a 37th minute substitute for Ryan Duncan.

Following his departure from Queen's Park in 2025, he signed for Arbroath. Shortly after signing for the club, he joined Clydebank on loan.

He signed for Forfar in September 2026.

== Personal life ==
Hickey-Fugaccia is the cousin of Brentford and Scotland player Aaron Hickey.

== Honours ==
Queen's Park

- Scottish Challenge Cup runner-up: 2024–25
