= 2020 Scottish Challenge Cup final =

- Event: 2019–20 Scottish Challenge Cup
Inverness Caledonian Thistle	Raith Rovers
–	–
- Shared

The 2020 Scottish Challenge Cup final, also known as the Tunnocks Caramel Wafer Challenge Cup final for sponsorship reasons, was a football match that was scheduled to take place between Raith Rovers and Inverness Caledonian Thistle, but was cancelled due to the coronavirus pandemic. Instead of contesting the final at a later date, the two clubs shared the cup.

== Route to the final ==
The competition is a knock-out tournament and was contested by 58 teams from Scotland, England, Wales, Northern Ireland and the Republic of Ireland in 2019–20. The competition was originally only contested by clubs in the Scottish football league system, but teams from Wales and Northern Ireland were added from 2016–17, the Republic of Ireland in 2017–18, and two teams from the English National League (fifth tier) were added from 2018–19.

=== Raith Rovers ===
Round	Opposition	Score
Second round	Ross County Under-21s (a)	3–2
Third round	Falkirk (h)	2–0
Fourth round	(Northern Ireland) Glenavon (h)	3–1
Quarter-final	Elgin City (h)	3–2
Semi-final	Partick Thistle (a)	2–1

=== Inverness ===
Round	Opposition	Score
Third round	Greenock Morton (h)	3–1
Fourth round	Alloa Athletic (h)	3–0
Quarter-final	Clyde (h)	0–0 (a.e.t.); 4–2 (p)
Semi-final	Rangers Under-21s (h)	2–1

== Match details and cancellation ==
Inverness player James Keatings was initially suspended for the final, having been sent off for being shown two yellow cards during the semi-final. An appeal against one of those cards, and the resulting suspension, was rejected by a Scottish Football Association panel. A new appeal hearing was convened when one of the panel members advised the SFA that they had not considered all of the available evidence. This second panel rescinded one of the cards, which would have made Keatings available to play in the final.

The match was originally scheduled for 28 March 2020, but all of Scottish football was suspended on 13 March due to the coronavirus pandemic. The Scottish Football Association confirmed on 16 March that the SPFL had postponed the match, pending further information from the Scottish Government about when and how football could be resumed. When the SPFL announced in October 2020 that the 2020–21 edition of the competition had been cancelled, it also said that the 2019–20 final would "be scheduled for a date later this season", i.e. during 2020–21.

On 30 April 2021, it was announced that the 2019–20 final would not be played and that both clubs would share the title instead.
