= Lesser Hampden =

Stadium in Glasgow City, Scotland

- Lesser
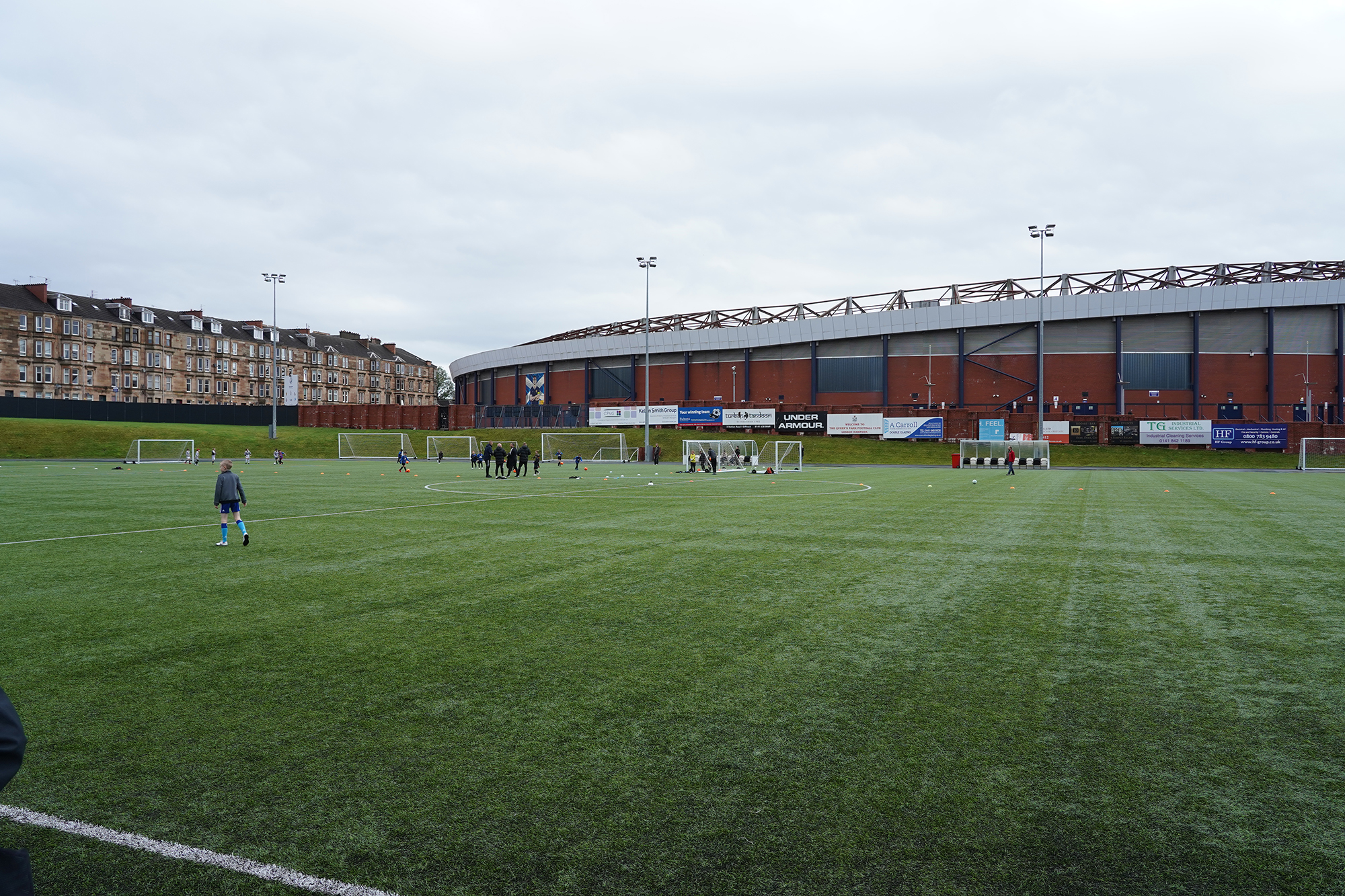
- Youth tournament at Lesser Hampden looking east towards Hampden Park's west stand, 2019

- Location in Glasgow
- Coordinates: 55°49′32″N 4°15′20″W
- Owner: Queen's Park F.C.
- Capacity: 12,000 (on opening); 990 (current)
- Surface: Grass

Construction
- Built: 1923
- Opened: 1925
- Renovated: 2012–2015

Tenant
- Queen's Park F.C. (2025–present)

Lesser Hampden is a football stadium in Mount Florida, Glasgow, Scotland, owned by Queen's Park F.C. and located immediately beside the western end of the national stadium, Hampden Park. Since 2023 its sponsored name has been The City Stadium (after City Facilities Management, owned by local businessman William Haughey, Baron Haughey).

== History ==
In 1923, Queen's Park were looking for an alternative venue for their reserves and youth teams, with a basic pitch to the south of the main stand at Hampden Park increasingly being used as a car park. The club purchased a farm on the west side of Hampden and built a pitch and stands. When it opened in 1925, Lesser Hampden had a capacity of 12,000. To reduce costs, the original farmhouse building was retained and was converted into a pavilion and dressing room. This farmhouse, now demolished, which dated back to the 19th century, was believed by football historians to be the oldest existing football stadium building in the world. The changing rooms were closed in 2013 for safety reasons.

During World War II, Lesser Hampden was commandeered by the British Government to serve as a base for the Home Guard. There were proposals to convert the site back to agriculture if there were food shortages, but the ground was returned to the football club at the end of the war in 1945.

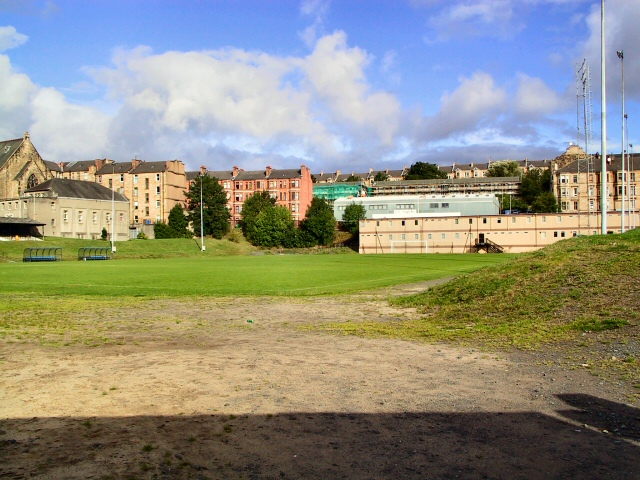
View of Lesser Hampden looking north, showing grass pitch and Portakabin offices, 2005

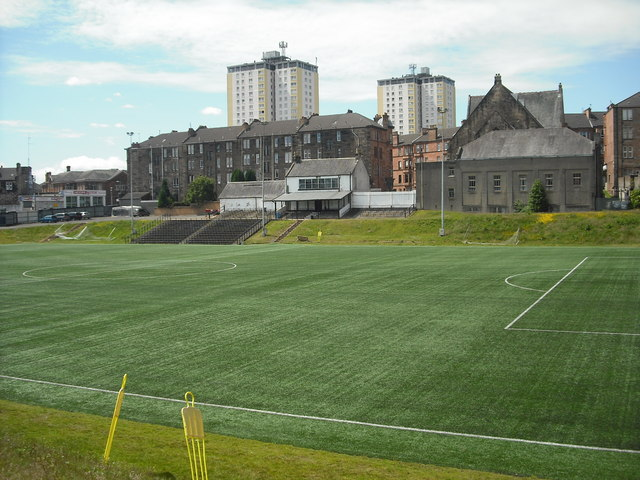
View of Lesser Hampden looking west, 2010 (prior to its redevelopment)

During the 1970s, several Queen's Park first team games were played at the stadium. During the redevelopment of the main Hampden Park stadium in the 1990s, the club played Scottish Football League matches at this ground. The ground served as a staging area for pre-game tailgate parties hosted by the Scottish Claymores American football team when they played at Hampden Park.

During preparations to make use of the site for the 2002 UEFA Champions League Final, it was discovered that Lesser Hampden was tainted with toxic chromium (VI), a byproduct from an old chemicals plant located in nearby Rutherglen. This was cleaned up at a cost of around £40,000.

Lesser Hampden is tightly hemmed in to the west by surrounding housing and commercial developments. It has some areas of terracing, floodlights and a small covered grandstand adjacent to the original farmhouse building. The natural grass pitch was replaced with a 3rd-Generation astro-grass pitch (funded partly by donations from local businessman Willie Haughey and partly from proceeds from well-attended cup ties) and was used as a warm-up area for athletes competing in the 2014 Commonwealth Games, as the track and field events were held at Hampden Park. Like the main stadium it was temporarily converted into an athletics venue and thereafter returned to football use.

Since Hampden's 1999 redevelopment, a row of Portakabins on the north side of the Lesser Hampden pitch had housed the Queen's Park club offices, with a proposed rebuild of the site as an elite youth development facility never materialising. In 2013 a new clubhouse at the south-west corner was completed, named the J. B. McAlpine Pavilion to honour the club's record goalscorer.

=== Adoption as a league stadium ===
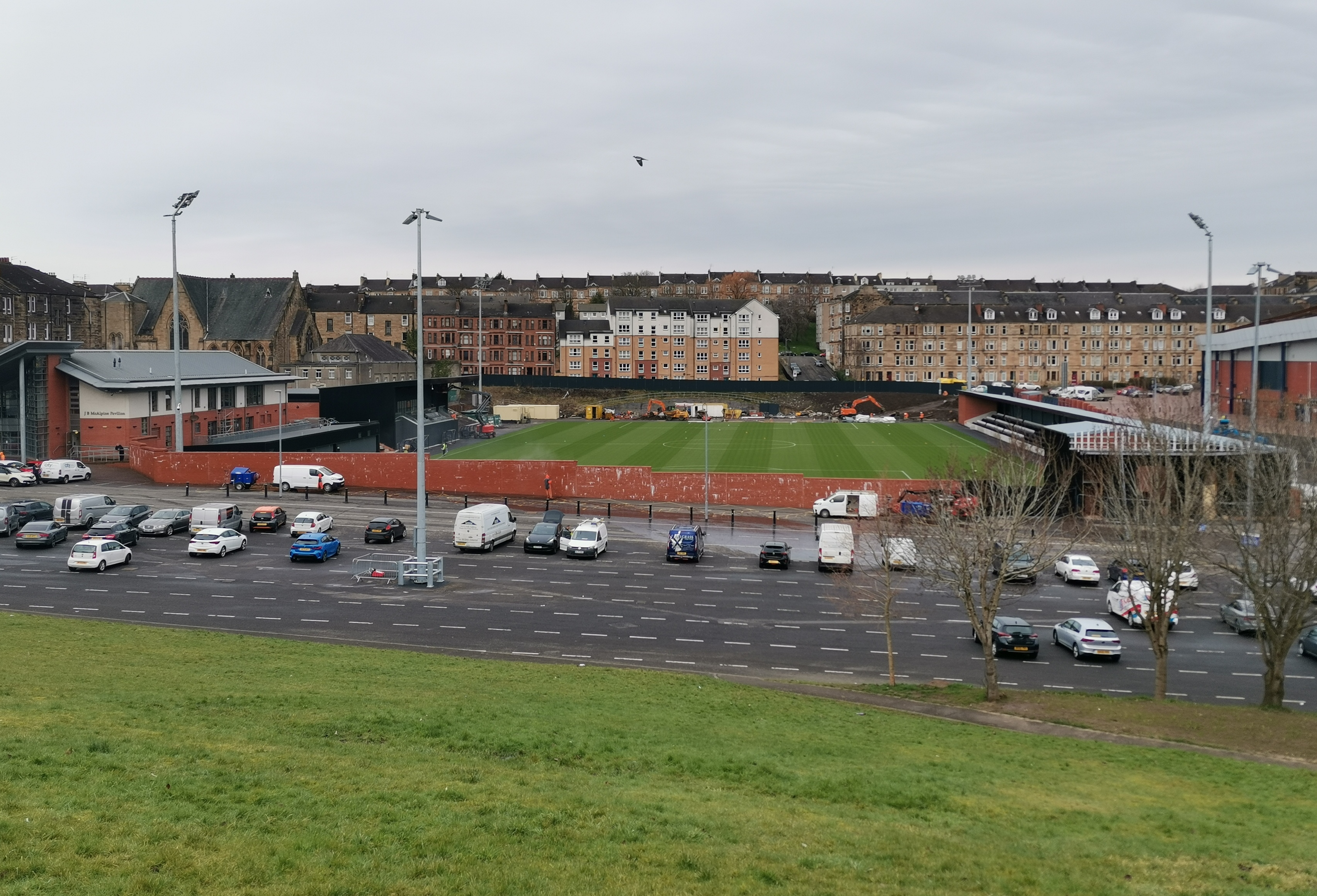
Ongoing construction, March 2023 (directors' box stand and east stand nearing completion)

In September 2018, it was announced that Queen's Park would return to Lesser Hampden to play first team matches on a permanent basis after agreeing to sell Hampden Park itself to the Scottish FA, which had been leasing the larger ground as the base for the national team. In November 2019, the club released plans to upgrade Lesser Hampden to an SPFL-standard venue which included an extension of the existing west stand, a new east stand and associated facilities, with a seating capacity of 1,774. Work on Lesser Hampden was delayed, which meant that Queen's Park had to groundshare at the Falkirk Stadium, at Firhill and then at Ochilview Park after their lease on Hampden expired.

The club released a revised plan in early December 2021; within two weeks, demolition of the farmhouse and byre had commenced.

Queen's Park moved back into Hampden for the 2023–24 season, having agreed a deal with the SFA to rent the stadium while allowing the Scotland national teams to use Lesser Hampden as a training pitch. This arrangement continued into the 2024–25 season, but they returned to Lesser Hampden for the 2025–26 season.

== See also ==
- Stadium relocations in Scottish football
