= Scottish Challenge Cup =

Association football competition in Scotland

- Founded: 1990
- Teams: 40
- Current champions: Raith Rovers (4 titles)
- Most championships: Falkirk and Raith Rovers (4 titles)
- Broadcaster: Premier Sports
- 2026–27 Scottish Challenge Cup

The Scottish Professional Football League Challenge Cup, commonly known as the Scottish League Challenge Cup or Scottish Challenge Cup, and currently known as the KDM Evolution Trophy for sponsorship reasons, is an association football knock-out cup competition run by the Scottish Professional Football League (SPFL). It is recognised as the third most prestigious knockout trophy in Scottish football, after the Scottish Cup and the Scottish League Cup.

The competition was first held during the 1990–91 season as the B&Q Centenary Cup to celebrate the 100th anniversary of the formation of the Scottish Football League (SFL). It was intended to be a one-off competition but was continued due to its popularity. It was originally contested by SFL (SPFL since 2013) teams below the top level of the Scottish football league system; select teams from lower levels of the league system were added in 2011–12, and guest teams from outside Scotland in 2016–17. For the 2019–20 edition there were 58 teams: 30 from the SPFL; the twelve Under-21 teams of the Scottish Premiership clubs; four each from the Highland League and Lowland League; and two guest teams from each of the NIFL Premiership, Cymru Premier, English National League, and League of Ireland Premier Division up until the 2019–20 season.

The first winner of the tournament was Dundee, who defeated Ayr United. Falkirk and Raith Rovers are the most successful teams in the tournament, with four wins each. Falkirk's most recent win came in 2012. The current holders are Raith Rovers, who defeated Inverness Caledonian Thistle in the 2026 final.

== Format ==
Until the 2025–26 season the Challenge Cup was a knock-out tournament. Within a regionalised format, clubs are paired at random and the first club drawn listed as the home team. The winner of each match progresses to the next round and the loser is eliminated from the tournament. Every match, including the final, is a one-legged tie that lasts 90 minutes plus any additional stoppage time. If no clear winner has been determined after 90 minutes of normal time, 30 minutes of extra time is played. If the score is still level after extra time then the winner is decided by a penalty shoot-out.

From the 2016–17 season, the competition was expanded to 58 entrants. All Scottish Professional Football League (SPFL) clubs participated, with the thirty clubs from the Championship, League One and League Two now joined by Under-20 teams from the twelve Premiership clubs. Also participating by invitation would be four teams each from the Highland and Lowland Leagues and eight entrants from outside Scottish football – two each from the NIFL Premiership in Northern Ireland, the National League in England, League of Ireland and the Welsh Premier League in Wales, until 2021 when the decision was made to only have the Scottish clubs participating due to the COVID-19 pandemic. Teams are seeded to enter the competition over any of the first four rounds, after which eight teams will remain to contest the quarter-finals. The final is played at a neutral venue.

In May 2024, it was announced the Cup would return to being Scottish-only for the 2024-25 season, with more Highland and Lowland League teams taking the place of the invited Northern Irish and Welsh clubs.

In May 2025, it was announced that for the 2025–26 edition, the cup would be reformatted to involve a 'League Phase', similar to that introduced in UEFA club competitions.

== History ==
The competition was created in the 1990–91 season to celebrate the 100th anniversary of the formation of the Scottish Football League in 1890. It was intended to run for only one season but continued due to its popularity. This was reflected in high attendances at matches in the later rounds of the tournament including a full capacity crowd of 11,500 at Fir Park in the first final. The cup was sponsored by DIY retail company B&Q and named the B&Q Centenary Cup for the first year and continued as the B&Q Cup for four seasons afterwards. The competition was run for three seasons without a sponsor due to the league covering the tournament costs and prize money, but was unsustainable and resulted in it being cancelled for one season in 1998–99 before being re-established in 1999 with a new sponsor. Although it is not as popular as competitions like the Scottish Cup, it provides smaller clubs with a realistic opportunity of winning a trophy due to the absence of top-tier clubs from the tournament. When Stenhousemuir won the final in 1995 it was regarded as the club's greatest achievement in its 111-year history. Attendances at matches in the earlier rounds of the tournament are not dissimilar to average home attendances in league competition but as the competition reaches the latter stages they generally increase; Annan Athletic's record attendance of 1,575 was set in a semi-final match against Falkirk in 2011.

The number of competitors has varied in relation to the number of clubs with Scottish Football League membership. The first tournament featured the 28 clubs in the First and Second Divisions which reduced to 26 until 1994 when the league was expanded and restructured into three divisions; increasing the number of eligible clubs to 30. In the 2010–11 competition the two highest ranked clubs from the Highland Football League with a Scottish Football Association licence were invited to compete, in order to bring the number of competitors to 32. Before the change in 2010, several clubs received a random bye in the first round in order to even out the number of fixtures. The Challenge Cup continued under the auspices of the Scottish Professional Football League after the Scottish Football League merged with the Scottish Premier League in 2013. One change at this time was that the two invitational places were split, with only one place filled by a Highland League club (with a valid SFA club licence) and the other place going to the winner of a preliminary round tie between clubs from the East of Scotland League and the South of Scotland League. This was simplified in the 2014–15 season, with the two additional places going to the Highland League champion (Brora Rangers) and the Lowland League champion (Spartans). From 2016 to 2017 the competition has been further expanded with the addition of Scottish Premiership Under-20 teams, additional places for the Highland and Lowland Leagues, which now have four representatives each, as well as the top two teams from Northern Ireland and Wales. The top two teams not to qualify for European competition from the League of Ireland were included in the competition for the 2017–18 season.

From 2018–19, the competition was further expanded with the two highest ranked teams still remaining in England's National League to take part from the second round. The first English teams to compete were Sutton United and Boreham Wood. The age level was raised for colts teams from under-20 to under-21 in a rule change introduced by the SPFL ahead of 2018–19 competition. The 2018–19 final also saw Connah's Quay Nomads become the first non-Scottish side to play in the final.

The COVID-19 pandemic in Scotland had a significant impact on the competition. The 2019–20 final, between Inverness Caledonian Thistle and Raith Rovers, was originally scheduled for 28 March 2020 but was postponed and later cancelled, with the teams sharing the title. Continuing restrictions on fans entering stadiums meant that the competition was unviable for most SPFL clubs, and the scheduled 2020–21 edition was cancelled in October 2020. It was announced in May 2021, that only Scottish clubs would participate in 2021–22 due to the coronavirus pandemic.

In 2024, it was announced that the format following the conclusion of the 2024–25 edition of the cup would change, where non-Scottish teams would no longer participate, whilst, controversially, the Premiership B Teams would still take part. Despite the Premiership B teams making up the bottom 10 spots in the League Phase, controversially, the B Teams were included for the 2026–27 edition, and the tournament was expanded further to a 40 team league phase, with 4 Highland League (Banks O' Dee, Clachnacuddin, Formartine United, and Fraserburgh), and 6 Lowland League (Berwick Rangers, Bonnyrigg Rose, Clydebank, Cowdenbeath, Cumbernauld Colts, and Gala Fairydean Rovers) clubs being invited as guests.

== Venues ==
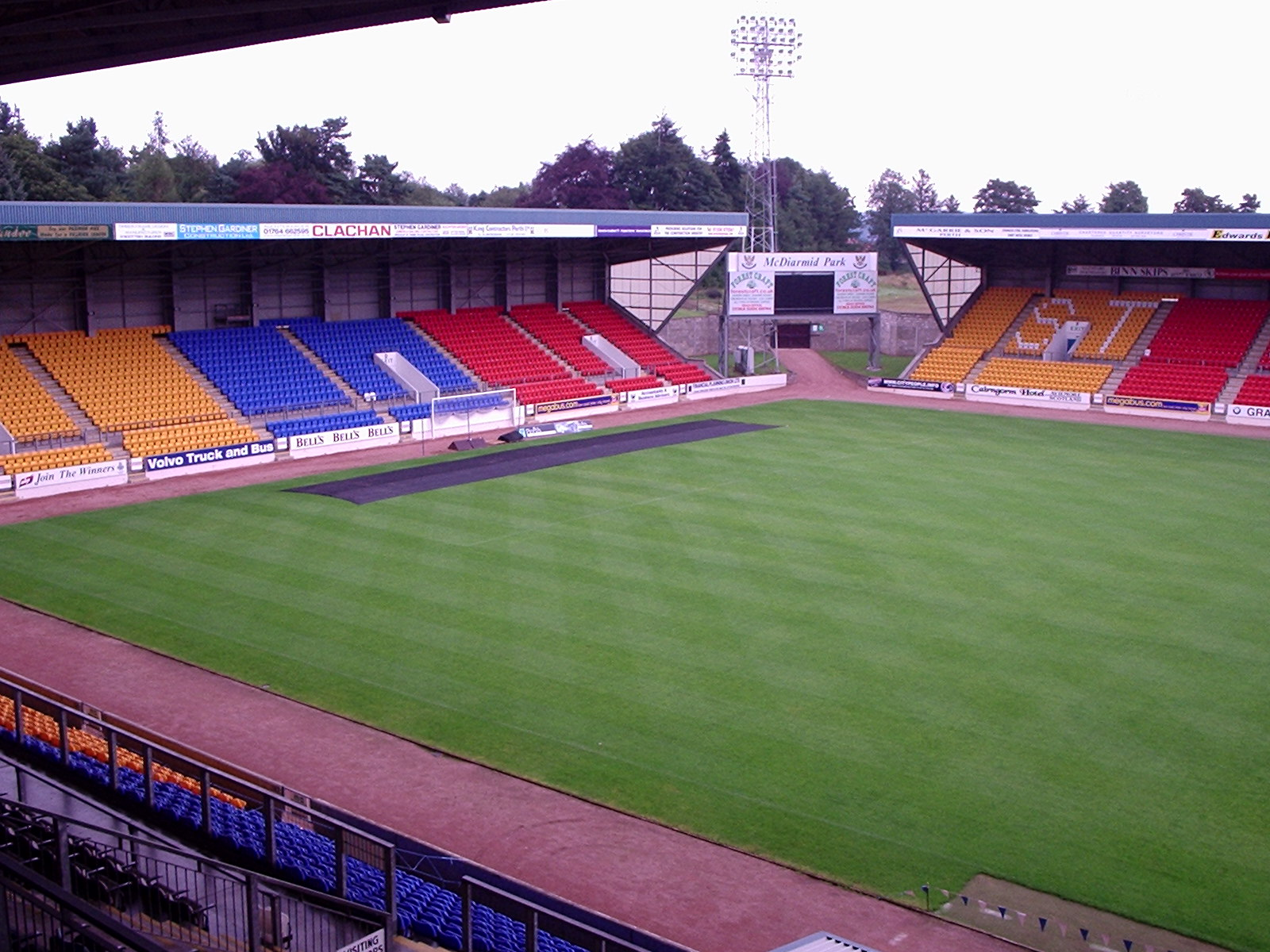
McDiarmid Park in Perth has hosted the final 10 times, more times than any other venue.

In the rounds before the final, the venue of each match is determined when the fixtures are drawn; the first club drawn in a fixture is named the home team and chooses the venue for the match, usually its own home ground. The venue may be switched to that of the away team or changed to a neutral venue for security reasons such as being unable to host a club with a large travelling fan base or the venue being unavailable.

=== Final venue ===
The final match of the tournament is played at a neutral venue, usually one that is geographically close or equidistant to where the clubs contesting the match are based. As of 2026, twelve different venues have hosted the final. Fir Park in Motherwell was the first, in 1990, and has since hosted four more finals, the last in 2017. McDiarmid Park in Perth has been the most frequent venue, staging it ten times between 1994 and 2018. Other venues to host the final more than once are Broadwood Stadium (Cumbernauld), Excelsior Stadium (Airdrie), Almondvale Stadium (Livingston) and Falkirk Stadium (Falkirk). The 2016 final was held at Hampden Park, the national stadium in Glasgow, due to the large support of eventual winners Rangers; that final drew the competition's record attendance of over 48,000.

== Winners and finalists ==
A total of 28 clubs have reached the final, of whom 17 have won the competition. The first winners were Dundee in 1990. The most successful club is Falkirk with four wins from four final appearances. Inverness Caledonian Thistle are the only club to have reached the final six times, winning on two occasions, sharing one, and losing three times. Four clubs have reached the final in successive seasons; Ayr United did so in the first two years of the tournament but lost both, Hamilton Academical and the original Airdrieonians defending their titles in 1992 and 1993, and 2001 and 2001, respectively, and Raith Rovers, who are the only team to make three finals in a row, sharing their first with Inverness Caledonian Thistle in April 2021, due to the COVID-19 pandemic cancelling the match, before defeating Queen of the South in the following final in 2021–22, then losing the third against Hamilton Academical in 2023. It is possible for the winner of the tournament to be unable to defend their title; if a club is promoted from the Scottish Championship (second tier) in the same season to the Scottish Premiership (first tier), the club becomes ineligible to compete in the tournament. This has happened to Falkirk twice; in 1994 and 2005, Inverness Caledonian Thistle in 2004, Livingston in 2025, St Mirren in 2006, Rangers in 2016, and Ross County in 2019.

Most winners and finalists have been from the second tier, while only four teams have won the competition from below this division. Stenhousemuir became the first team to do so in 1995, followed by Stranraer a year later in 1996 and Alloa Athletic in 1999. The most recent club to win from below the second tier was Queen of the South, in 2013. All winners and runners-up from below the second tier have been from the third tier.

In 2019, Connah's Quay Nomads of Wales were the first non-Scottish side to reach the final of the Scottish Challenge Cup; despite taking the lead in the 21st minute, they eventually lost 3–1 to Ross County. In 2024, another Welsh side, The New Saints also made the final of the Challenge Cup, becoming the second foreign side to achieve this feat, however, like Connah's Quay, fell to defeat after taking an early lead, eventually losing 2–1 to Airdrieonians. They would become the last foreign side to reach the final, as the format for the following seasons would not include non-Scottish sides.

== Finals ==
The winner of the tournament is decided by a final elimination match which lasts 90 minutes plus any additional stoppage time. If the score is level and a winner has not been determined after 90 minutes of normal time, 30 minutes of extra time is played, followed by a penalty shoot-out if the score is still level. Eight finals have gone to extra time, with two being decided in this period of play. The further six have been decided by penalty shoot-out.

Key to list of finals
| * | Match went to extra time |
| † | Match decided by a penalty shoot-out after extra time |
| ‡ | Winning team won the second tier of Scottish football league system |
| Italics | Team from below the second tier of the Scottish football league system |
| (England) , (Wales) , (Northern Ireland) , or (Republic of Ireland) | Team from outside the Scottish football league system |

=== Results ===
Scottish Challenge Cup finals
| Season | Winner | Score | Runner-up | Venue | Attendance |
|---|---|---|---|---|---|
| 1990–91 | Dundee | 3–2 * | Ayr United | Fir Park | 11,506 |
| 1991–92 | Hamilton Academical | 1–0 | Ayr United | Fir Park | 9,663 |
| 1992–93 | Hamilton Academical | 3–2 | Morton | Love Street | 7,391 |
| 1993–94 | Falkirk ‡ | 3–0 | St Mirren | Fir Park | 13,763 |
| 1994–95 | Airdrieonians | 3–2 * | Dundee | McDiarmid Park | 8,844 |
| 1995–96 | Stenhousemuir | 0–0 † | Dundee United | McDiarmid Park | 7,856 |
| 1996–97 | Stranraer | 1–0 | St Johnstone | Broadwood Stadium | 5,222 |
| 1997–98 | Falkirk | 1–0 | Queen of the South | Fir Park | 9,735 |
| 1998–99 | Competition suspended due to lack of sponsorship | | | | |
| 1999–2000 | Alloa Athletic | 4–4 † | Inverness Caledonian Thistle | Excelsior Stadium | 4,043 |
| 2000–01 | Airdrieonians | 2–2 † | Livingston | Broadwood Stadium | 5,623 |
| 2001–02 | Airdrieonians | 2–1 | Alloa Athletic | Broadwood Stadium | 4,548 |
| 2002–03 | Queen of the South | 2–0 | Brechin City | Broadwood Stadium | 6,428 |
| 2003–04 | Inverness Caledonian Thistle ‡ | 2–0 | Airdrie United | McDiarmid Park | 5,428 |
| 2004–05 | Falkirk ‡ | 2–1 | Ross County | McDiarmid Park | 7,471 |
| 2005–06 | St Mirren ‡ | 2–1 | Hamilton Academical | Excelsior Stadium | 9,613 |
| 2006–07 | Ross County | 1–1 † | Clyde | McDiarmid Park | 4,062 |
| 2007–08 | St Johnstone | 3–2 | Dunfermline Athletic | Dens Park | 6,446 |
| 2008–09 | Airdrie United | 2–2 † | Ross County | McDiarmid Park | 4,091 |
| 2009–10 | Dundee | 3–2 | Inverness Caledonian Thistle | McDiarmid Park | 8,031 |
| 2010–11 | Ross County | 2–0 | Queen of the South | McDiarmid Park | 5,124 |
| 2011–12 | Falkirk | 1–0 | Hamilton Academical | Almondvale Stadium | 5,210 |
| 2012–13 | Queen of the South | 1–1 † | Partick Thistle | Almondvale Stadium | 9,452 |
| 2013–14 | Raith Rovers | 1–0 * | Rangers | Easter Road | 19,983 |
| 2014–15 | Livingston | 4–0 | Alloa Athletic | McDiarmid Park | 2,869 |
| 2015–16 | Rangers ‡ | 4–0 | Peterhead | Hampden Park | 48,133 |
| 2016–17 | Dundee United | 2–1 | St Mirren | Fir Park | 8,089 |
| 2017–18 | Inverness Caledonian Thistle | 1–0 | Dumbarton | McDiarmid Park | 4,602 |
| 2018–19 | Ross County ‡ | 3–1 | (Wales) Connah's Quay Nomads | Caledonian Stadium | 3,057 |
| 2019–20 | Final match not played; trophy shared by Inverness Caledonian Thistle and Raith Rovers | | | | |
| 2020–21 | Tournament cancelled | | | | |
| 2021–22 | Raith Rovers | 3–1 | Queen of the South | Excelsior Stadium | 4,452 |
| 2022–23 | Hamilton Academical | 1–0 | Raith Rovers | Falkirk Stadium | 5,566 |
| 2023–24 | Airdrieonians | 2–1 | (Wales) The New Saints | Falkirk Stadium | 3,191 |
| 2024–25 | Livingston | 5–0 | Queen's Park | Falkirk Stadium | 4,079 |
| 2025–26 | Raith Rovers | 4–1 | Inverness Caledonian Thistle | Firhill Stadium | 4,812 |

=== Performance by club ===
Performance by club
| Club | Wins | Last final won | Runners-up | Last final lost | Total final appearances |
|---|---|---|---|---|---|
| Raith Rovers | 4 | 2026 | 1 | 2023 | 5 |
| Falkirk | 4 | 2012 | 0 | — | 4 |
| Inverness Caledonian Thistle | 3 | 2020* | 3 | 2026 | 6 |
| Hamilton Academical | 3 | 2023 | 2 | 2012 | 5 |
| Ross County | 3 | 2019 | 2 | 2008 | 5 |
| Airdrieonians (1878) | 3 | 2001 | 0 | — | 3 |
| Queen of the South | 2 | 2013 | 3 | 2022 | 5 |
| Dundee | 2 | 2009 | 1 | 1994 | 3 |
| Airdrieonians | 2 | 2024 | 1 | 2003 | 3 |
| Livingston | 2 | 2025 | 1 | 2000 | 3 |
| St Mirren | 1 | 2005 | 2 | 2017 | 3 |
| Alloa Athletic | 1 | 1999 | 2 | 2015 | 3 |
| Dundee United | 1 | 2017 | 1 | 1995 | 2 |
| Rangers | 1 | 2016 | 1 | 2014 | 2 |
| St Johnstone | 1 | 2007 | 1 | 1996 | 2 |
| Stranraer | 1 | 1996 | 0 | — | 1 |
| Stenhousemuir | 1 | 1995 | 0 | — | 1 |
| Ayr United | 0 | — | 2 | 1991 | 2 |
| Queen's Park | 0 | — | 1 | 2025 | 1 |
| (Wales) The New Saints | 0 | — | 1 | 2024 | 1 |
| (Wales) Connah's Quay Nomads | 0 | — | 1 | 2019 | 1 |
| Dumbarton | 0 | — | 1 | 2018 | 1 |
| Peterhead | 0 | — | 1 | 2016 | 1 |
| Partick Thistle | 0 | — | 1 | 2013 | 1 |
| Dunfermline Athletic | 0 | — | 1 | 2007 | 1 |
| Clyde | 0 | — | 1 | 2006 | 1 |
| Brechin City | 0 | — | 1 | 2002 | 1 |
| Morton | 0 | — | 1 | 1992 | 1 |

== List of winning managers ==
List of winning managers
| Season | Manager | Nationality | Club | Notes |
|---|---|---|---|---|
| 1990–91 | Gordon Wallace | Scotland | Dundee | |
| 1991–92 | Billy McLaren | Scotland | Hamilton Academical | |
| 1992–93 | Iain Munro | Scotland | Hamilton Academical | |
| 1993–94 | Jim Jefferies | Scotland | Falkirk | |
| 1994–95 | Alex MacDonald | Scotland | Airdrieonians | |
| 1995–96 | Terry Christie | Scotland | Stenhousemuir | First manager to win the competition with a club outside of the second tier. |
| 1996–97 | Campbell Money | Scotland | Stranraer | |
| 1997–98 | Alex Totten | Scotland | Falkirk | |
| 1999–2000 | Terry Christie (2) | Scotland | Alloa Athletic | First manager to win the competition more than once, with two different clubs. |
| 2000–01 | Steve Archibald | Scotland | Airdrieonians | |
| 2001–02 | Ian McCall | Scotland | Airdrieonians | |
| 2002–03 | John Connolly | Scotland | Queen of the South | |
| 2003–04 | John Robertson | Scotland | Inverness Caledonian Thistle | |
| 2004–05 | John Hughes | Scotland | Falkirk | |
| 2005–06 | Gus MacPherson | Scotland | St Mirren | |
| 2006–07 | Scott Leitch | Scotland | Ross County | |
| 2007–08 | Sandy Stewart | Scotland | St Johnstone | |
| 2008–09 | Kenny Black | Scotland | Airdrie United | |
| 2009–10 | Jocky Scott | Scotland | Dundee | |
| 2010–11 | Jimmy Calderwood | Scotland | Ross County | |
| 2011–12 | Steven Pressley | Scotland | Falkirk | |
| 2012–13 | Allan Johnston | Scotland | Queen of the South | |
| 2013–14 | Grant Murray | Scotland | Raith Rovers | |
| 2014–15 | Mark Burchill | Scotland | Livingston | |
| 2015–16 | Mark Warburton | England | Rangers | First non-Scottish manager to win the competition. |
| 2016–17 | Ray McKinnon | Scotland | Dundee United | |
| 2017–18 | John Robertson (2) | Scotland | Inverness Caledonian Thistle | First manager to win the cup more than once with the same club. |
| 2018–19 | Steven Ferguson; Stuart Kettlewell | Scotland | Ross County | First co-managers to win the cup |
| 2019–20 | John Robertson (3) | Scotland | Inverness Caledonian Thistle | First manager to win the cup three times |
| 2019–20 | John McGlynn | Scotland | Raith Rovers | |
| 2021–22 | John McGlynn (2) | Scotland | Raith Rovers | First manager to win the cup two consecutive seasons |
| 2022–23 | John Rankin | Scotland | Hamilton Academical | |
| 2023–24 | Rhys McCabe | Scotland | Airdrieonians | Youngest manager to win the Scottish Challenge Cup, being 31 at the time of the victory. |
| 2024–25 | David Martindale | Scotland | Livingston | |
| 2025–26 | Dougie Imrie | Scotland | Raith Rovers | |

== Sponsorship and media coverage ==
Petrofac sponsored the Scottish Challenge Cup from 2014 to 2016.

The Scottish Challenge Cup has been sponsored several times since it was introduced in 1990. The sponsor has been able to determine the name of the competition. There have been four sponsors since the competition's formation as well as several name changes within the duration of each sponsorship. The competition relies on revenue earned from sponsorship although it has been able to run without a sponsor over two periods but had to be suspended for one season in 1998–99 as a consequence.

- 1990–1995: B&Q (B&Q Centenary Cup (until 1991) then B&Q Cup)
- 1995–1998: No sponsor
- 1999–2006: Bell's whisky (Bell's Challenge Cup (until 2002) then Bell's Cup)
- 2006–2008: No sponsor
- 2008–2011: MG Alba (ALBA Challenge Cup)
- 2011–2014 Ramsdens (Ramsdens Cup)
- 2014–2016: Petrofac (Petrofac Training Cup)
- 2016–2019: Irn-Bru (Irn-Bru Cup)
- 2019–2020: Tunnock's (Tunnock's Caramel Wafer Challenge Cup)
- 2021–2025: SPFL Trust (SPFL Trust Trophy)
- 2025–: KDM Group (KDM Evolution Trophy)

Selected games have been broadcast live on the Scottish Gaelic language television channel BBC Alba since 2008, which is run jointly by former sponsor MG Alba and the BBC. Every final since the 2008 final has been broadcast live on the channel and the arrangement was extended for three more years in 2012 despite the end of MG Alba's sponsorship of the competition in 2011. With the expansion of the competition to include teams from Northern Ireland and Wales from 2016 to 2017, additional contracts for live match coverage have been agreed with Premier Sports and S4C.

== See also ==
- Scottish C Division League Cup
- Scottish B Division Supplementary Cup
- Spring Cup
