= 2022–23 Queen's Park F.C. season =

Queen's Park
2022–23 season
- Chief Executive: Leeann Dempster
- Manager: Owen Coyle
- Stadium: Ochilview Park; Hampden Park
- Scottish Championship: Third place
- Scottish Cup: Fourth round
- League Cup: Group stage
- Challenge Cup: Quarter-final
- Glasgow Cup: Group stage
- Top goalscorer: League: Simon Murray (15); All: Simon Murray (18)
- Highest home attendance: 3,231 vs. Hamilton Academical, Championship, 3 December 2022
- Lowest home attendance: 220 vs. Forfar Athletic, League Cup, 12 July 2022
- Average home league attendance: 1,008
Home colours	Away colours

The 2022–23 season was Queen's Park's first season in Scottish Championship following their promotion from League One at the end of the 2021–22 season. Queen's also competed in the Scottish Cup, League Cup, Challenge Cup and Glasgow Cup.

== Summary ==
On 25 March 2022, Queen's announced the appointment of Owen Coyle as their new head coach who would take up the position from June 1.

On 25 May 2022, Queen's announced the team would play their League Cup home ties at Ochilview Park, as the redevelopment of Lesser Hampden was unable to be completed before the start of the new season.

On 13 June 2022, the club started a new initiative to facilitate and stimulate the further flow of academy players. Starting from this season, the first team will be playing with a development team, Young Queen’s Park.

== Results and fixtures ==
Win Draw Loss Postponed

=== Pre-season and friendlies ===
29 June 2022	(Croatia) Lokomotiva Zagreb	3−1	Queen's Park	Heelsum, Netherlands
14:00	Kačavenda 68'; Florucz 73'; Soldo 78'	Report	Williamson 80'	Stadium: Renkumse Voetbalvereniging Wilhelmina
Note: The game is 120 minutes.

2 July 2022	(Netherlands) FC Utrecht	2−4	Queen's Park	Utrecht, Netherlands
18:00	Veerman 29'; El Azrak 58'	Report	Murray 12', 56'; Savoury 73'; Trialist 77'	Stadium: Zoudenbalch; Attendance: 1,200

5 July 2022	Alloa Athletic	0−0	Queen's Park	Alloa
19:30		Report		Stadium: Recreation Park
Note: The game is not completed.

16 July 2022	East Kilbride	2−3	Young Queen's Park	Airdrie
12:00	Page 50'; McLaughlin 58'	Report	Trialist 18'; Naismith 23'; Williamson 38'	Stadium: MTC Park

24 July 2022	Rangers	3−2	Young Queen's Park	Milngavie
15:00	Reid 47' (o.g.); Lovelace 78', 84'	Report	Williamson 27', 46'	Stadium: Rangers Training Centre

2 August 2022	Young Queen's Park	4−2	Hibernian Development	Rutherglen
15:00	Williamson 36', 61', 68'; Connolly 81'	Report	Tait 11'; Hamilton 49'	Stadium: New Southcroft Park

9 August 2022	Vale of Leven	1−3	Queen's Park	Alexandria
19:15	Richardson 44'	Report	Scott 12'; Connolly 51'; McCormick 85' (pen.)	Stadium: Millburn Park
Note: 150th Anniversary game of Vale of Leven.

18 August 2022	Ayr United	0−4	Young Queen's Park	Cumnock
15:00		Report	Connolly 47', 65'; Scott 62'; Longridge 75'	Stadium: Townhead Park

23 August 2022	Young Queen's Park	2−6	Dundee United B	Pollok
15:00	Brown 12' (pen.); McCormick 68'	Report	Anaku 34', 39', 56'; Clark 43'; Cudjoe 57'; Fotheringham 69'	Stadium: Lochinch Sports Pavilion

29 August 2022	St Mirren	1−2	Young Queen's Park	St Mirren Park
19:00	63'	Report	Naismith 4'; Moore 22'

=== Scottish Championship ===
30 July 2022 1	Inverness CT	1−1	Queen's Park	Inverness
15:00	Mckay 44'	Report	Davidson 13'	Stadium: Caledonian Stadium; Attendance: 1,993; Referee: Grant Irvine

5 August 2022 2	Queen's Park	2−3	Ayr United	Stenhousemuir
19:45	Murray 18'; Thomas 32'	Report	Akinyemi 46', 90+2' (pen.); McGinty 78'	Stadium: Ochilview Park; Attendance: 943; Referee: Matthew MacDermid

13 August 2022 3	Queen's Park	3−2	Partick Thistle	Stenhousemuir
15:00	Savoury 36'; Robson 67'; Murray 76'	Report	McMillan 64'; Dowds 87'	Stadium: Ochilview Park; Attendance: 1,357; Referee: Steven McLean

20 August 2022 4	Arbroath	1−2	Queen's Park	Arbroath
15:00	Shanks 78'	Report	O'Brien 19' (o.g.); Williamson 74'	Stadium: Gayfield Park; Attendance: 1,905; Referee: Steven Kirkland

27 August 2022 5	Queen's Park	2−1	Cove Rangers	Stenhousemuir
15:00	Murray 45' (pen.), 64'	Report	McIntosh 65'	Stadium: Ochilview Park; Attendance: 471; Referee: William Collum

3 September 2022 6	Dundee	3−0	Queen's Park	Dundee
15:00	Robinson 27' (pen.), 44'; Rudden 70'	Report		Stadium: Dens Park; Attendance: 4,178; Referee: Grant Irvine

17 September 2022 7	Hamilton Academical	0−2	Queen's Park	Hamilton
15:00		Report	Murray 43'; Savoury 52'	Stadium: New Douglas Park; Attendance: 1,472; Referee: Graham Grainger

1 October 2022 8	Queen's Park	1−0	Raith Rovers	Stenhousemuir
15:00	Eze 59'	Report		Stadium: Ochilview Park; Attendance: 862; Referee: Grant Irvine

4 October 2022 9	Queen's Park	1−2	Greenock Morton	Stenhousemuir
15:00	Boateng 68'	Report	Kabia 19'; Muirhead 58'	Stadium: Ochilview Park; Attendance: 471; Referee: Steven Kirkland

8 October 2022 10	Ayr United	5−0	Queen's Park	Ayr
15:00	Akinyemi 6', 36', 53'; Young 59'; Dempsey 62'	Report		Stadium: Somerset Park; Attendance: 2,052; Referee: Don Robertson

14 October 2022 11	Queen's Park	1−1	Arbroath	Stenhousemuir
19:45	Jarrett 30'	Report	Linn 60'	Stadium: Ochilview Park; Attendance: 657; Referee: John Beaton

22 October 2022 12	Partick Thistle	0−4	Queen's Park	Glasgow
15:00		Report	Robson 26'; Eze 49'; McPake 54', 84'	Stadium: Firhill Stadium; Attendance: 3,088; Referee: Chris Graham

28 October 2022 13	Queen's Park	2−2	Dundee	Stenhousemuir
19:45	Jarrett 30'; Robson 53'; Thomas (red card) 89'	Report	McMullan 52'; Osei 87'	Stadium: Ochilview Park; Attendance: 1,006; Referee: Barry Cook

4 November 2022 14	Cove Rangers	2−0	Queen's Park	Aberdeen
19:45	Scully 3', 76'	Report		Stadium: Balmoral Stadium; Attendance: 605; Referee: Grant Irvine

12 November 2022 15	Queen's Park	2−1	Inverness CT	Stenhousemuir
17:30	Fox 50'; Murray 73'	Report	Mckay 18'	Stadium: Ochilview Park; Attendance: 593; Referee: Scott Lambie

19 November 2022 16	Raith Rovers	2−5	Queen's Park	Kirkcaldy
15:00	Connolly 18', 82'	Report	Murray 36', 48'; Thomas 44', 77'; Thomson 72'	Stadium: Stark's Park; Attendance: 1,861; Referee: Don Robertson

3 December 2022 17	Queen's Park	4−0	Hamilton Academical	Glasgow
15:00	Savoury 25', 45+2'; Murray 28'; McPake 36'	Report		Stadium: Hampden Park; Attendance: 3,231; Referee: William Collum

23 December 2022 18	Arbroath	1−4	Queen's Park	Arbroath
19:45	Fosu 90+2'	Report	Thomas 43'; Murray 45+2'; Savoury 51', 66'	Stadium: Gayfield Park; Attendance: 1,267; Referee: Duncan Williams

2 January 2023 19	Queen's Park	2−0	Partick Thistle	Stenhousemuir
15:00	Murray 5'; Jarrett 76'	Report		Stadium: Ochilview Park; Attendance: 1,665; Referee: Steven Kirkland

7 January 2023 20	Cove Rangers	0−6	Queen's Park	Aberdeen
15:00		Report	Murray 12', 38', 62', 65'; Davidson 30'; Savoury 77'	Stadium: Balmoral Stadium; Attendance: 625; Referee: David Dickinson

14 January 2023 21	Inverness CT	0−0	Queen's Park	Inverness
15:00		Report		Stadium: Caledonian Stadium; Attendance: 2,038; Referee: Steven McLean

28 January 2023 22	Dundee	3−0	Queen's Park	Dundee
15:00	Williamson 69'; Jakubiak 74'; Sweeney 83'	Report		Stadium: Dens Park; Attendance: 5,004; Referee: Euan Anderson

3 February 2023 23	Queen's Park	2−0	Ayr United	Stenhousemuir
19:45	Thomas 59' (pen.); McAllister 79' (o.g.)	Report		Stadium: Ochilview Park; Attendance: 1,192; Referee: Steven McLean

11 February 2023 24	Greenock Morton	3−2	Queen's Park	Greenock
15:00	Oakley 20', 22'; Baird 48'	Report	Savoury 14'; Shields 67'	Stadium: Cappielow; Attendance: 1,572; Referee: David Dickinson

17 February 2023 25	Queen's Park	1−1	Raith Rovers	Stenhousemuir
19:45	Shields 51'	Report	Akio 74'	Stadium: Ochilview Park; Attendance: 923; Referee: Craig Napier

25 February 2023 26	Hamilton Academical	1−4	Queen's Park	Hamilton
15:00	Zanatta 68'	Report	Thomson 30'; Healy 57'; Shields 63', 76'	Stadium: New Douglas Park; Attendance: 1,310; Referee: William Collum

4 March 2023 27	Queen's Park	2−2	Greenock Morton	Stenhousemuir
15:00	Robson 19'; Oakley 30'	Report	Oakley 58', 81'	Stadium: Ochilview Park; Attendance: 1,059; Referee: Mike Roncone

10 March 2023 28	Queen's Park	1−0	Cove Rangers	Stenhousemuir
19:45	Neill 78' (o.g.)	Report		Stadium: Ochilview Park; Attendance: 571; Referee: Steven McLean

18 March 2023 29	Queen's Park	2−1	Inverness CT	Stenhousemuir
15:00	Savoury 64'; Eze 70'	Report	MacKay 27'	Stadium: Ochilview Park; Attendance: 627; Referee: Alan Muir

24 March 2023 30	Queen's Park	0−1	Arbroath	Stenhousemuir
19:45		Report	Hilson 76'	Stadium: Ochilview Park; Attendance: 747; Referee: Kevin Clancy

1 April 2023 31	Raith Rovers	2−0	Queen's Park	Kirkcaldy
15:00	Lang 30'; Vaughan 62'	Report	Fox (red card) 79'	Stadium: Stark's Park; Attendance: 1,679; Referee: Grant Irvine

7 April 2023 32	Partick Thistle	4−0	Queen's Park	Glasgow
19:45	Holt 50', 90+2'; Turner 67'; Mullen 86'	Report		Stadium: Firhill Stadium; Attendance: 3,783; Referee: William Collum

14 April 2023 33	Queen's Park	1−0	Hamilton Academical	Stenhousemuir
19:45	Savoury 74'	Report		Stadium: Ochilview Park; Attendance: 679; Referee: Calum Scott

21 April 2023 34	Ayr United	0−0	Queen's Park	Ayr
19:45		Report		Stadium: Somerset Park; Attendance: 2,230; Referee: Steven McLean

29 April 2023 35	Greenock Morton	2−1	Queen's Park	Greenock
15:00	Gillespie 44' (pen.); Crawford 65'	Report	Boateng 32'	Stadium: Cappielow; Attendance: 2,888; Referee: John Beaton

5 May 2023 36	Queen's Park	3−5	Dundee	Stenhousemuir
19:45	Fox 10', 45+1'; Shields 12'	Report	Jakubiak 4'; Ashcroft 17'; Robinson 34'; Cameron 54'; McCowan 81'	Stadium: Ochilview Park; Attendance: 2,045; Referee: David Munro

==== Premiership play-off ====
9 May 2023 Quarter-final 1st Leg	Partick Thistle	4−3	Queen's Park	Glasgow
19:45	Turner 15'; McMillan 28'; Fitzpatrick 69'; Graham 90+7'	Report	Thomas 33', 87'; Boateng 83'	Stadium: Firhill Stadium; Attendance: 3,754; Referee: Kevin Clancy

12 May 2023 Quarter-final 2nd Leg	Queen's Park	0−4 (3−8 agg.)	Partick Thistle	Stenhousemuir
19:45		Report	Graham 14'; Tiffoney 28'; Holt 41'; Mullen 82'	Stadium: Ochilview Park; Attendance: 1,581; Referee: Colin Steven

=== Scottish League Cup ===
==== Group stage ====
9 July 2022 1	Stranraer	2−5	Queen's Park	Stranraer
15:00	Robertson 43'; McLean 45+3'	Report	Murray 9', 28', 45+4'; Savoury 41', 90+2'	Stadium: Stair Park; Attendance: 215; Referee: Alan Muir

12 July 2022 2	Queen's Park	4−1	Forfar Athletic	Stenhousemuir
19:45	Kilday 40', 90+1'; Williamson 69'; Moore 84'	Report	McCluskey 47'	Stadium: Ochilview Park; Attendance: 220; Referee: Scott Lambie

19 July 2022 3	Queen's Park	1−2	Dundee	Stenhousemuir
19:45	Longridge 52'	Report	Jakubiak 31'; Kerr 36'	Stadium: Ochilview Park; Attendance: 570; Referee: Willie Collum

23 July 2022 4	Hamilton Academical	1−1 (5−3 p)	Queen's Park	Hamilton
15:00	Winter 4'	Report	Davidson 78'	Stadium: New Douglas Park; Attendance: 786; Referee: Don Robertson

=== Scottish Challenge Cup ===
25 September 2022 Third round	(Northern Ireland) Cliftonville	2−3	Queen's Park	Belfast
13:45	Coates 14'; Addis 51'	Report	Savoury 3'; Williamson 27'; Thomas 71'	Stadium: Solitude; Referee: Lee Tavinder

10 December 2022 Fourth round	Queen's Park	2−0	Montrose	Glasgow
15:00	Thomas 27'; McPake 90+2'	Report		Stadium: Hampden Park; Attendance: 1,013; Referee: Scott Lambie

11 January 2023 Quarter-final	Queen's Park	0−1	Raith Rovers	Stenhousemuir
19:45		Report	Frederiksen 80'	Stadium: Ochilview Park; Attendance: 636; Referee: Chris Graham

=== Scottish Cup ===
Queen's Park initially progressed to the fifth round of the Scottish Cup, but were expelled from the competition after fielding an ineligible player in their fourth round match with Inverness.

26 November 2022 Third round	Peterhead	0−3	Queen's Park	Peterhead
15:00		Report	Thomas 30', 62'; Savoury 90'	Stadium: Balmoor Stadium; Attendance: 455; Referee: Duncan Williams

31 January 2023 Fourth round	Inverness CT	3-0	Queen's Park	Inverness
19:45		Report	Thomas 74'; Williamson 84'	Stadium: Caledonian Stadium; Attendance: 869; Referee: Chris Graham

=== Glasgow Cup ===
==== Group stage ====
29 November 2022 1	Queen's Park	2−1	Partick Thistle	Glasgow
15:00	Connolly 9'; Fairlie 81'	Report	Weston 3'	Stadium: Lochinch Park

28 February 2023 2	Celtic B	2−0	Queen's Park	Lennoxtown
14:00	Summers 37'; Letsosa 90'	Report		Stadium: Lennoxtown Training Centre

18 April 2023 Semi-final	Rangers B	4−0	Queen's Park	Milngavie
	Ure 25', 83'; Ishaka 30'; Lovelace 88'	Report		Stadium: Rangers Training Centre

== Player statistics ==
As of 12 May 2023 (UTC)

No.	Pos	Nat	Player	Total		Championship		League Cup		Challenge Cup		Scottish Cup		Glasgow Cup	
No.	Pos	Nat	Player	Apps	Goals	Apps	Goals	Apps	Goals	Apps	Goals	Apps	Goals	Apps	Goals
1	GK	(England) ENG	Calum Ferrie	47	0	38+0	0	4+0	0	3+0	0	2+0	0	0+0	0
2	DF	(Scotland) SCO	Jason Naismith	9	0	1+2	0	0+2	0	2+1	0	1+0	0	0+0	0
2	DF	(England) ENG	Marcel Oakley	15	1	15+0	1	0+0	0	0+0	0	0+0	0	0+0	0
3	DF	(England) ENG	Thomas Robson	45	4	37+1	4	4+0	0	1+0	0	2+0	0	0+0	0
4	DF	(Scotland) SCO	Lee Kilday	37	2	30+2	0	3+0	2	2+0	0	0+0	0	0+0	0
5	DF	(England) ENG	Charlie Fox	31	3	25+0	3	4+0	0	1+0	0	1+0	0	0+0	0
6	MF	(Scotland) SCO	Liam Brown	6	0	2+0	0	3+1	0	0+0	0	0+0	0	0+0	0
7	MF	(Scotland) SCO	Louis Longridge	27	1	6+12	0	3+1	1	2+1	0	1+1	0	0+0	0
8	MF	(Scotland) SCO	Jack Thomson	40	2	34+0	2	3+1	0	1+0	0	1+0	0	0+0	0
9	FW	(Republic of Ireland) IRL	Johnny Kenny	11	0	2+9	0	0+0	0	0+0	0	0+0	0	0+0	0
9	FW	(Scotland) SCO	Euan Henderson	11	0	4+6	0	0+0	0	0+0	0	1+0	0	0+0	0
10	FW	(Scotland) SCO	Josh McPake	32	4	17+10	3	0+1	0	2+1	1	1+0	0	0+0	0
11	FW	(Scotland) SCO	Dom Thomas	46	12	36+1	7	4+0	0	2+1	2	2+0	3	0+0	0
12	DF	(Scotland) SCO	Jake Davidson	45	3	21+15	2	4+0	1	3+0	0	2+0	0	0+0	0
14	MF	(Scotland) SCO	Lewis Moore	9	1	0+4	0	0+3	1	0+1	0	0+0	0	1+0	0
15	DF	(Scotland) SCO	Max Gillies	1	0	0+0	0	0+0	0	0+0	0	0+0	0	1+0	0
16	MF	(Scotland) SCO	Cameron Bruce	5	0	0+1	0	0+0	0	1+0	0	0+0	0	3+0	0
17	GK	(Scotland) SCO	Jacques Heraghty	2	0	0+0	0	0+0	0	0+0	0	0+0	0	2+0	0
18	MF	(Scotland) SCO	Calum Biggar	6	0	0+1	0	0+0	0	1+0	0	0+1	0	3+0	0
19	FW	(Scotland) SCO	Scott Williamson	34	4	7+17	1	0+4	1	2+1	1	0+2	1	1+0	0
20	MF	(Scotland) SCO	Alex Fairlie	3	1	0+0	0	0+0	0	0+0	0	0+0	0	2+1	1
21	MF	(Scotland) SCO	Grant Savoury	45	13	32+4	10	4+0	2	2+1	1	2+0	0	0+0	0
22	MF	(Scotland) SCO	Aaron Healey	17	1	3+12	1	0+0	0	1+0	0	0+0	0	1+0	0
23	FW	(Scotland) SCO	Simon Murray	28	18	22+0	15	4+0	3	1+0	0	1+0	0	0+0	0
24	DF	(Scotland) SCO	Archie Graham	2	0	0+0	0	0+0	0	0+0	0	0+0	0	1+1	0
25	MF	(Scotland) SCO	Alex Bannon	24	0	8+9	0	1+1	0	2+1	0	0+2	0	0+0	0
26	FW	(Scotland) SCO	Gregor Nicol	2	0	0+0	0	0+0	0	0+0	0	0+0	0	2+0	0
27	MF	(England) ENG	Patrick Jarrett	28	3	8+14	3	3+1	0	1+0	0	1+0	0	0+0	0
29	FW	(Scotland) SCO	Connor Shields	16	5	16+0	5	0+0	0	0+0	0	0+0	0	0+0	0
32	DF	(Scotland) SCO	Zach Mauchin	2	0	0+0	0	0+0	0	0+0	0	0+0	0	1+1	0
33	DF	(Scotland) SCO	Kane Thomson	2	0	0+0	0	0+0	0	0+0	0	0+0	0	2+0	0
34	MF	(Scotland) SCO	Liam McQuaid	3	0	0+0	0	0+0	0	0+0	0	0+0	0	1+2	0
35	DF	(Scotland) SCO	Lewis Reid	4	0	0+1	0	0+0	0	0+0	0	0+0	0	3+0	0
36	MF	(Scotland) SCO	Andrew Lind	2	0	0+0	0	0+0	0	0+0	0	0+0	0	2+0	0
38	MF	(Scotland) SCO	Liam McLeish	2	0	0+0	0	0+0	0	0+0	0	0+0	0	2+0	0
40	FW	(Scotland) SCO	Lennon Connolly	6	1	0+1	0	0+0	0	0+2	0	0+0	0	2+1	1
41	GK	(Scotland) SCO	Callan McKenna	1	0	0+0	0	0+0	0	0+0	0	0+0	0	1+0	0
42	MF	(England) ENG	Malachi Boateng	40	3	35+0	3	0+0	0	3+0	0	2+0	0	0+0	0
47	MF	(England) ENG	David Boateng	6	0	1+4	0	0+0	0	1+0	0	0+0	0	0+0	0
66	DF	(Nigeria) NGR	Stephen Eze	26	3	17+5	3	0+0	0	2+0	0	2+0	0	0+0	0

== Team statistics ==
=== Championship table ===
Pos	Team	Pld	W	D	L	GF	GA	GD	Pts	Promotion, qualification or relegation
1	Dundee (C, P)	36	17	12	7	66	40	+26	63	Promotion to the Premiership
2	Ayr United	36	16	10	10	61	43	+18	58	Qualification for the Premiership play-off semi-final
3	Queen's Park	36	17	7	12	63	52	+11	58	Qualification for the Premiership play-off quarter-final
4	Partick Thistle	36	16	9	11	65	45	+20	57	Qualification for the Premiership play-off quarter-final
5	Greenock Morton	36	15	12	9	53	43	+10	57	

Rules for classification: 1) Points; 2) Goal difference; 3) Goals scored; 4) Head-to-to head points; 5) Head-to-head goal difference; 6) Play-off (only for deciding promotion, play-off participation and relegation).
(C) Champions; (P) Promoted

=== League Cup table ===
Pos	Team	Pld	W	PW	PL	L	GF	GA	GD	Pts	Qualification	DND	HAM	QPA	FOR	STR
1	Dundee	4	4	0	0	0	13	2	+11	12	Qualification for the second round	—	3–0	—	5–1	—
2	Hamilton Academical	4	2	1	0	1	9	6	+3	8		—	—	p1–1	—	5–2
3	Queen's Park	4	2	0	1	1	11	6	+5	7		1–2	—	—	4–1	—
4	Forfar Athletic	4	1	0	0	3	5	12	−7	3		—	0–3	—	—	3–0 (Note: Forfar Athletic were awarded a technical 3−0 win over Stranraer, who fielded an ineligible player. The match had originally finished 2–2, with Forfar Athletic securing the bonus point following a 5–3 win on penalties.)
5	Stranraer	4	0	0	0	4	4	16	−12	0		0–3	—	2–5	—	—

Rules for classification: 1) goal difference, 2) goals scored, 3) away goals scored, 4) matches won, 5) away matches won, 6) drawing of lots.

== Transfers ==
=== Players in ===
Player	From	Fee
(Scotland) Dom Thomas	(Scotland) Dunfermline Athletic	Free
(Scotland) Grant Savoury	(Scotland) Peterhead	Free
(Scotland) Jason Naismith	(Scotland) Kilmarnock	Free
(England) Patrick Jarrett	(England) Stoke City	Free
(Nigeria) Stephen Eze	(Croatia) NK Solin	Free
(Scotland) Aaron Healy	(Scotland) Arthurlie	Undisclosed

=== Players out ===
Player	To	Fee
(Scotland) Willie Muir	(Scotland) Alloa Athletic	Free
(Scotland) Peter Grant	(Scotland) Clyde	Free
(Scotland) Stuart Morrison	(Scotland) Queen of the South	Free
(Scotland) Darren Lyon	(Scotland) Kelty Hearts	Free
(Scotland) Bob McHugh	(Scotland) East Kilbride	Free
(Scotland) Jai Quitongo	(Scotland) Greenock Morton	Free
(Australia) Will Baynham	(United States) Lexington SC	Free
(Scotland) Grant Gillespie	(Scotland) Greenock Morton	Free
(Scotland) Michael Doyle	(Scotland) Hamilton Academical	Free
(Scotland) Jason Naismith	(Scotland) Cove Rangers	Free
(Scotland) Simon Murray	(Scotland) Ross County	Undisclosed

=== Loans in ===
Player	From	Fee
(Scotland) Josh McPake	(Scotland) Rangers	Loan
(England) Malachi Boateng	(England) Crystal Palace	Loan
(Republic of Ireland) Johnny Kenny	(Scotland) Celtic	Loan
(England) David Boateng	(England) Crystal Palace	Loan
(Scotland) Euan Henderson	(Scotland) Heart of Midlothian	Loan
(Scotland) Connor Shields	(Scotland) Motherwell	Loan
(England) Marcel Oakley	(England) Birmingham City	Loan

=== Loans out ===
Player	To	Fee
(Scotland) Callum Yeats	(Scotland) Stenhousemuir	Loan
(Scotland) Max Gillies	(Scotland) Peterhead	Loan
(Scotland) Liam Brown	(Scotland) Stenhousemuir	Loan
(Scotland) Liam Russell	(Scotland) St Roch's	Loan
(Scotland) Gregor Nicol	(Scotland) Gala Fairydean Rovers	Loan
(Scotland) Max Gillies	(Scotland) Forfar Athletic	Loan

== See also ==
- List of Queen's Park F.C. seasons
