= 2021–22 Queen's Park F.C. season =

Queen's Park
2021–22 season
- Chief Executive: Leeann Dempster
- Manager: Laurie Ellis (until 31 December); Marijn Beuker (Interim, until 20 March); John Potter (Interim)
- Stadium: Firhill Stadium
- Scottish League One: Fourth place
- Championship Play-off: Winners (promoted)
- Scottish Cup: Third round
- League Cup: Group stage
- Challenge Cup: Third round
- Glasgow Cup: Runners-up
- Top goalscorer: League: Luca Connell; Bob McHugh (8 each); All: Simon Murray (9 goals)
- Highest home attendance: 1,899 vs. Airdrieonians, Championship Play-off, 12 May 2022
- Lowest home attendance: 200 vs. Airdrieonians, League Cup, 17 July 2021
- Average home league attendance: 676
| Home colours | Away colours |

The 2021–22 season is Queen's Park's first season in Scottish League One following their promotion from League Two at the end of the 2020–21 season and their second full season as a professional football club following the repeal of their amateur status. Queen's also competed in the Scottish Cup, League Cup, Challenge Cup and Glasgow Cup.

== Summary ==
On 10 May 2021, following their promotion from League Two, the club announced that manager Ray McKinnon would be stepping down from his position ahead of the new season.

On 21 May, Queen's assistant coach Laurie Ellis was promoted to the position of first-team head-coach.

On 3 June, the club announced a groundshare agreement with Partick Thistle to play their home matches at Firhill Stadium while redevelopment work continues at Lesser Hampden.

On 7 June, Queens Park made history by paying their first ever transfer fee to bring former midfielder Liam Brown back to the club from Edinburgh City.

On 15 July, Dempster revealed that Queen's Park would return to home ground Lesser Hampden as early as the end of 2021.

On 30 November, the club announced the appointment of Marijn Beuker as director of football operations.

On 31 December, head-coach Laurie Ellis and his assistant Grant Murray both left the club after a run of just one win in eight games.

On 18 January 2022, Queen's competed in their first fixture of the renewed Glasgow Cup tournament, which had cancelled the previous two years because of the ongoing pandemic.

On 25 March 2022, Queen's announced the appointment of Owen Coyle as their new head coach who would take up the position from June 1st.

== Results and fixtures ==
Win Draw Loss Postponed

=== Pre-season ===
| 26 June 2021 | University of Stirling | 2–2 | Queen's Park | Gannochy Sports Centre, Stirling |
| 14:00 |

| 29 June 2021 | Hamilton Academical | 2–2 | Queen's Park | New Douglas Park, Hamilton |
| 14:00 |

| 3 July 2021 | Raith Rovers | 2–2 | Queen's Park | Stark's Park, Kirkcaldy |
| 14:00 | Connolly 27'; Poplatnik 71' | Report | Longridge 49'; Baynham 54' |

=== Scottish League One ===
| 31 July 2021 1 | East Fife | 1–1 | Queen's Park | Bayview Stadium |
| 15:00 | Watt 8' | Report | Fox 47' | Attendance: 320; Referee: Chris Fordyce |

| 7 August 2021 2 | Queen's Park | 2–0 | Cove Rangers | Firhill Stadium |
| 15:00 | Murray 53'; McHugh 54' | Report | Fyvie (red card) 45+1' | Attendance: 401; Referee: Calum Scott |

| 14 August 2021 3 | Queen's Park | 3–0 | Dumbarton | Firhill Stadium |
| 15:00 | Murray 24'; Longridge 49'; Brown 88' | Report | | Attendance: 613; Referee: Craig Napier |

| 21 August 2021 4 | Alloa Athletic | 1–1 | Queen's Park | Recreation Park |
| 15:00 | Howie (red card) 34'; Boyd 78' | Report | Murray 56' | Attendance: 610; Referee: Chris Fordyce |

| 28 August 2021 5 | Falkirk | 0–1 | Queen's Park | Falkirk Stadium |
| 15:00 | | Report | Murray 36' | Attendance: 4,043; Referee: Colin Steven |

| 11 September 2021 6 | Queen's Park | 0–0 | Airdrieonians | Firhill Stadium |
| 15:00 | | Report | | Attendance: 446; Referee: Calum Scott |

| 18 September 2021 7 | Clyde | 2–2 | Queen's Park | Broadwood Stadium |
| 15:00 | Goodwillie 36', 90' | Report | Longridge 55'; Gillespie 58' (pen.) | Attendance: 651; Referee: Duncan Williams |

| 25 September 2021 8 | Queen's Park | 3–2 | Peterhead | Firhill Stadium |
| 15:00 | Robson 5'; Connell 76'; Thomson 80' | Report | Ritchie 51'; Lyle 54' | Attendance: 546; Referee: Chris Fordyce |

| 3 October 2021 9 | Queen's Park | 1–1 | Montrose | Firhill Stadium |
| 15:00 | Smith 54' | Report | Milne 68' | Attendance: 596; Referee: Scott Lambie |

| 16 October 2021 10 | Dumbarton | 0–3 | Queen's Park | Dumbarton Football Stadium |
| 15:00 | | Report | Gillespie 49' (pen.); McHugh 74'; Longstaff 79' | Attendance: 652; Referee: Barry Cook |

| 23 October 2021 11 | Queen's Park | 3–4 | Alloa Athletic | Firhill Stadium |
| 15:00 | McHugh 34', 49'; Connell 88' | Report | Cawley 1'; Howie 54'; Henderson 90', 90+2' | Attendance: 681; Referee: Chris Fordyce |

| 30 October 2021 12 | Cove Rangers | 3–3 | Queen's Park | Balmoral Stadium |
| 15:00 | McAllister 5'; Megginson 69'; Morrison 77' (o.g.) | Report | McHugh 40'; Longridge 45'; Murray (red card) 66'; Doyle 83' | Attendance: 531; Referee: Graham Grainger |

| 6 November 2021 13 | Queen's Park | 1–1 | East Fife | Firhill Stadium |
| 15:00 | Kilday 86' | Report | Millar 90+5' | Attendance: 597; Referee: Stewart Luke |

| 13 November 2021 14 | Queen's Park | 0–0 | Clyde | Firhill Stadium |
| 15:00 | | Report | | Attendance: 839; Referee: Euan Anderson |

| 20 November 2021 15 | Peterhead | 2–1 | Queen's Park | Balmoor Stadium |
| 15:00 | Brown 55' (pen.); McLean 76' | Report | Connell 10' | Attendance: 527; Referee: Scott Lambie |

| 4 December 2021 16 | Queen's Park | 6–0 | Falkirk | Firhill Stadium |
| 15:00 | Longridge 4'; Brown 35', 65'; Connell 68'; Fox 77'; Longstaff 84' | Report | | Attendance: 1,119; Referee: Euan Anderson |

| 18 December 2021 18 | Montrose | 1–1 | Queen's Park | Links Park |
| 15:00 | Webster 49' (pen.) | Report | Longridge 26' | Attendance: 594; Referee: Dan McFarlane |

| 29 December 2021 17 | Airdrieonians | 1–0 | Queen's Park | Excelsior Stadium |
| 19:45 | McInroy 71' | Report | Thomson (red card) 80' | Attendance: 500; Referee: Chris Fordyce |

| 15 January 2022 22 | Alloa Athletic | 1–1 | Queen's Park | Recreation Park |
| 15:00 | Cawley 58' | Report | Smith 38' | Attendance: 484; Referee: Alan Muir |

| 22 January 2022 20 | Clyde | 1–1 | Queen's Park | Broadwood Stadium |
| 15:00 | Goodwillie 70' (pen.) | Report | Doyle 65' | Attendance: 811; Referee: Graham Grainger |

| 29 January 2022 23 | Queen's Park | 1–1 | Airdrieonians | Firhill Stadium |
| 15:00 | Fox 27' | Report | McGill 28' | Attendance: 832; Referee: Dan McFarlane |

| 5 February 2022 24 | Falkirk | 1–1 | Queen's Park | Falkirk Stadium |
| 15:00 | Dowds 49'; Nesbitt (red card) 90+5' | Report | Smith 15' | Attendance: 3,427; Referee: Stewart Luke |

| 8 February 2022 19 | Queen's Park | 2–1 | Dumbarton | Firhill Stadium |
| 19:45 | Longstaff 7', 45+1' | Report | Carswell 27' (pen.) | Attendance: 428; Referee: Greg Aitken |

| 12 February 2022 25 | Cove Rangers | 0–0 | Queen's Park | Balmoral Stadium |
| 15:00 | | Report | Longstaff (red card) 34' | Attendance: 544; Referee: Alan Newlands |

| 19 February 2022 26 | East Fife | 1–1 | Queen's Park | Bayview Stadium |
| 15:00 | Ferrie 6' (o.g.) | Report | Brown 20' | Referee: Matthew MacDermid |

| 26 February 2022 27 | Queen's Park | 0–1 | Montrose | Firhill Stadium |
| 15:00 | | Report | Quinn 45' | Attendance: 680; Referee: Euan Anderson |

| 1 March 2022 21 | Queen's Park | 2–1 | Peterhead | Firhill Stadium |
| 19:45 | McHugh 1'; Thomson 46' | Report | McLean 90' | Attendance: 350; Referee: Duncan Williams |

| 5 March 2022 28 | Dumbarton | 0–3 | Queen's Park | Dumbarton Football Stadium |
| 15:00 | | Report | Connell 5', 36'; Longridge 75' | Referee: Steven Reid |

| 12 March 2022 29 | Queen's Park | 1–1 | Alloa Athletic | Firhill Stadium |
| 15:00 | Darcy 84' | Report | Durnan 49' | Attendance: 750; Referee: Grant Irvine |

| 19 March 2022 30 | Airdrieonians | 2–0 | Queen's Park | Excelsior Stadium |
| 15:00 | Smith 38'; Easton 45+1' | Report | | Referee: Scott Lambie |

| 26 March 2022 31 | Queen's Park | 1–0 | Clyde | Firhill Stadium |
| 15:00 | McHugh 59'; Grant (red card) 75' | Report | | Attendance: 896; Referee: Barry Cook |

| 3 April 2022 32 | Queen's Park | 1–1 | Cove Rangers | Firhill Stadium |
| 15:00 | McHugh 54' | | McIntosh 90+3' |

| 9 April 2022 33 | Queen's Park | 1–0 | East Fife | Firhill Stadium |
| 15:00 | Connell 90+2' (pen.) | Report | | Attendance: 580; Referee: Lloyd Wilson |

| 16 April 2022 34 | Peterhead | 2–1 | Queen's Park | Balmoor Stadium |
| 15:00 | Duncan 4'; Savoury 49'; Brown (red card) 79' | Report | Murray 64' | Attendance: 615; Referee: Dan McFarlane |

| 23 April 2022 35 | Montrose | 2–1 | Queen's Park | Links Park |
| 15:00 | Doyle 78' (o.g.); Dillon 81' | Report | Smith 1' | Attendance: 720; Referee: Chris Graham |

| 30 April 2022 36 | Queen's Park | 1 – 1 | Falkirk | Firhill Stadium |
| 15:00 | Quitongo 30' | Report | Morrison 84' | Attendance: 922; Referee: Chris Fordyce |

=== Championship play-off ===
| 4 May 2022 Semi-final 1st Leg | Queen's Park | 0 – 0 | Dunfermline Athletic | Firhill Stadium |
| 19:45 | | Report | | Attendance: 1,403; Referee: Colin Steven |

| 7 May 2022 Semi-final 2nd Leg | Dunfermline Athletic | 0 – 1 (0 – 1 agg.) | Queen's Park | East End Park |
| 15:00 | Ambrose (red card) 58' | Report | Murray 89' | Attendance: 3,179; Referee: Craig Napier |

| 12 May 2022 Final 1st Leg | Queen's Park | 1 – 1 | Airdrieonians | Firhill Stadium |
| 19:30 | Murray 64' | Report | McCabe 87' (pen.) | Attendance: 1,899; Referee: Gavin Duncan |

| 15 May 2022 Final 2nd Leg | Airdrieonians | 1 – 2 (a.e.t.) (2 – 3 agg.) | Queen's Park | Excelsior Stadium |
| 13:10 | McCabe 13' | Report | Smith 17'; Murray 112' (pen.) | Attendance: 3,770; Referee: Steven McLean |

=== Scottish League Cup ===
==== Group stage ====
Results

| 10 July 2021 1 | Queen of the South | 0–1 | Queen's Park | Dumfries |
| 15:00 | | Report | Biggar 54' | Stadium: Palmerston Park; Attendance: 500; Referee: John Beaton |

| 14 July 2021 2 | Queen's Park | 0–1 | Motherwell | Glasgow |
| 19:45 | | Report | Lawless 15' | Stadium: Firhill Stadium; Attendance: 250; Referee: Kevin Clancy |

| 17 July 2021 3 | Queen's Park | 0–0 (3–4 p) | Airdrieonians | Glasgow |
| 15:00 | | Report | | Stadium: Firhill Stadium; Attendance: 200; Referee: Graham Grainger |

| 20 July 2021 4 | Annan Athletic | 1–2 | Queen's Park | Annan |
| 19:45 | McHugh 22' (o.g.) | Report | Swinglehurst 13' (o.g.); Murray 81' | Stadium: Galabank Stadium; Attendance: 300; Referee: Steven Reid |

=== Scottish Challenge Cup ===
| 10 August 2021 First round | Queen's Park | 1–1 (5–4 p) | Bonnyrigg Rose Athletic | Glasgow |
| 20:15 | Gillespie 75' (pen.) | Report | Hoskins 61' | Stadium: Firhill Stadium; Referee: Lloyd Wilson |

| 3 September 2021 Second round | Airdrieonians | 1–1 (4–5 p) | Queen's Park | Airdrie |
| 19:45 | Smith 49' | Report | Gillespie 86' (pen.) | Stadium: Excelsior Stadium; Attendance: 460; Referee: Grant Irvine |

| 8 October 2021 Third round | Kilmarnock | 3–1 | Queen's Park | Kilmarnock |
| 19:45 | Shaw 14'; Murray 53'; Hendry 69' | Report | Gillespie 50' (pen.) | Stadium: Rugby Park; Attendance: 2,149; Referee: Alan Muir |

=== Scottish Cup ===
| 27 November 2021 Third round | Queen's Park | 0–1 | Kilmarnock | Glasgow |
| 15:00 | Doyle (red card) 88' | Report | Murray 45+1' | Stadium: Firhill Stadium; Attendance: 1,153; Referee: Grant Irvine |

=== Glasgow Cup ===
==== Group stage ====
Results

| 18 January 2022 1 | Partick Thistle | 1–2 | Queen's Park | Glasgow |
| 15:00 | MacIver 14' | Report | Thomson 5'; Biggar 54' | Stadium: Petershill Park |

| 22 February 2022 2 | Queen's Park | 3–3 | Celtic B | Glasgow |
| 13:00 | Darcy 7'; Thomson 18' (pen.); Williamson 37' | | Dawson 1'; Dembélé 59' (pen.); Letsosa 89' | Stadium: Newlandsfield Park |

| 8 March 2022 3 | Rangers B | 2–0 | Queen's Park | Milngavie |
| 15:00 | Weston 65', 70' | Report | | Stadium: Rangers Training Centre |

| 15 March 2022 4 | Clyde | 1–3 | Queen's Park | Cumbernauld |
| 20:15 | Jones 89' | Report | Longstaff 29'; McBride 67'; McLeish 81' | Stadium: Broadwood Stadium |

==== Knockout phase ====
| 20 April 2022 Semi-final | Queen's Park | 5–0 | Clyde | Cumbernauld |
| 19:45 | McBride 15'; Williamson 34', 50'; Nicol 90'; Fairlie 90+1' | Report | | Stadium: Broadwood Stadium |

| 9 May 2022 Final | Rangers B | 3–1 | Queen's Park | Cumbernauld |
| 20:15 | McKinnon 2'; Ure 68'; McCann 75' (pen.) | | Williamson 21' | Stadium: Broadwood Stadium |

== Player statistics ==
As of 15 May 2021 (UTC)

| No. | Pos | Nat | Player | Total | | League One + Championship Play-off | | League Cup | | Challenge Cup | | Scottish Cup | | Glasgow Cup | |
| No. | Pos | Nat | Player | Apps | Goals | Apps | Goals | Apps | Goals | Apps | Goals | Apps | Goals | Apps | Goals |
|---|---|---|---|---|---|---|---|---|---|---|---|---|---|---|---|
| 1 | GK | (Scotland) SCO | Willie Muir | 16 | 0 | 12+0 | 0 | 3+0 | 0 | 1+0 | 0 | 0+0 | 0 | 0+0 | 0 |
| 2 | DF | (Scotland) SCO | Jake Davidson | 31 | 0 | 12+9 | 0 | 4+0 | 0 | 0+0 | 0 | 1+0 | 0 | 5+0 | 0 |
| 3 | DF | (England) ENG | Thomas Robson | 46 | 1 | 39+0 | 1 | 3+0 | 0 | 1+2 | 0 | 1+0 | 0 | 0+0 | 0 |
| 4 | DF | (Scotland) SCO | Lee Kilday | 26 | 1 | 21+2 | 1 | 0+0 | 0 | 2+0 | 0 | 0+0 | 0 | 1+0 | 0 |
| 5 | DF | (Scotland) SCO | Peter Grant | 16 | 0 | 12+2 | 0 | 0+0 | 0 | 0+0 | 0 | 1+0 | 0 | 1+0 | 0 |
| 6 | DF | (Scotland) SCO | Stuart Morrison | 17 | 0 | 10+1 | 0 | 4+0 | 0 | 1+0 | 0 | 0+0 | 0 | 1+0 | 0 |
| 7 | FW | (Scotland) SCO | Louis Longridge | 39 | 6 | 31+4 | 6 | 0+0 | 0 | 2+1 | 0 | 1+0 | 0 | 0+0 | 0 |
| 8 | MF | (Scotland) SCO | Darren Lyon | 20 | 0 | 9+4 | 0 | 2+0 | 0 | 2+0 | 0 | 0+0 | 0 | 3+0 | 0 |
| 9 | FW | (Scotland) SCO | Bob McHugh | 38 | 8 | 26+6 | 8 | 1+1 | 0 | 3+0 | 0 | 1+0 | 0 | 0+0 | 0 |
| 10 | MF | (Scotland) SCO | Liam Brown | 40 | 4 | 31+1 | 4 | 4+0 | 0 | 2+1 | 0 | 1+0 | 0 | 0+0 | 0 |
| 11 | FW | (Scotland) SCO | Jai Quitongo | 22 | 1 | 3+16 | 1 | 0+0 | 0 | 0+0 | 0 | 0+0 | 0 | 3+0 | 0 |
| 12 | GK | (England) ENG | Calum Ferrie | 30 | 0 | 26+0 | 0 | 1+0 | 0 | 2+0 | 0 | 1+0 | 0 | 0+0 | 0 |
| 14 | MF | (Scotland) SCO | Lewis Moore | 20 | 0 | 6+5 | 0 | 4+0 | 0 | 2+1 | 0 | 0+1 | 0 | 1+0 | 0 |
| 15 | DF | (Scotland) SCO | Max Gillies | 15 | 0 | 2+4 | 0 | 0+2 | 0 | 1+1 | 0 | 0+0 | 0 | 5+0 | 0 |
| 16 | DF | (Scotland) SCO | Callum Yeats | 5 | 0 | 0+0 | 0 | 0+1 | 0 | 2+1 | 0 | 0+0 | 0 | 1+0 | 0 |
| 17 | GK | (Scotland) SCO | Jacques Heraghty | 7 | 0 | 1+0 | 0 | 0+0 | 0 | 0+0 | 0 | 0+0 | 0 | 6+0 | 0 |
| 18 | MF | (Scotland) SCO | Calum Biggar | 16 | 2 | 2+2 | 0 | 4+0 | 1 | 1+1 | 0 | 0+1 | 0 | 4+1 | 1 |
| 19 | DF | (England) ENG | Charlie Fox | 40 | 3 | 33+2 | 3 | 1+0 | 0 | 2+0 | 0 | 0+0 | 0 | 1+1 | 0 |
| 20 | FW | (Australia) AUS | Will Baynham | 1 | 0 | 0+0 | 0 | 1+0 | 0 | 0+0 | 0 | 0+0 | 0 | 0+0 | 0 |
| 21 | MF | (Scotland) SCO | Grant Gillespie | 30 | 5 | 19+2 | 2 | 4+0 | 0 | 2+1 | 3 | 1+0 | 0 | 1+0 | 0 |
| 22 | MF | (Scotland) SCO | Jack Thomson | 35 | 3 | 21+9 | 1 | 0+0 | 0 | 2+1 | 0 | 0+0 | 0 | 2+0 | 2 |
| 23 | FW | (Scotland) SCO | Simon Murray | 28 | 9 | 15+7 | 8 | 3+1 | 1 | 0+2 | 0 | 0+0 | 0 | 0+0 | 0 |
| 24 | DF | (Scotland) SCO | Michael Doyle | 44 | 2 | 35+2 | 2 | 4+0 | 0 | 2+0 | 0 | 1+0 | 0 | 0+0 | 0 |
| 25 | MF | (Scotland) SCO | Alex Bannon | 5 | 0 | 0+0 | 0 | 0+0 | 0 | 0+0 | 0 | 0+0 | 0 | 4+1 | 0 |
| 26 | FW | (Scotland) SCO | Gregor Nicol | 5 | 1 | 0+1 | 0 | 0+2 | 0 | 0+0 | 0 | 0+0 | 0 | 1+1 | 1 |
| 27 | MF | (Scotland) SCO | Connor Smith | 35 | 6 | 25+7 | 6 | 0+0 | 0 | 1+0 | 0 | 1+0 | 0 | 1+0 | 0 |
| 28 | FW | (England) ENG | Luis Longstaff | 35 | 5 | 9+20 | 4 | 0+0 | 0 | 1+0 | 0 | 0+1 | 0 | 3+1 | 1 |
| 29 | FW | (Scotland) SCO | Connor McBride | 17 | 2 | 5+10 | 0 | 0+0 | 0 | 0+0 | 0 | 0+0 | 0 | 2+0 | 2 |
| 31 | GK | (Scotland) SCO | Reece Beveridge | 0 | 0 | 0+0 | 0 | 0+0 | 0 | 0+0 | 0 | 0+0 | 0 | 0+0 | 0 |
| 37 | MF | (Scotland) SCO | Alex Fairlie | 1 | 0 | 0+0 | 0 | 0+0 | 0 | 0+0 | 0 | 0+0 | 0 | 0+1 | 0 |
| 38 | DF | (Scotland) SCO | Archie Graham | 4 | 0 | 0+0 | 0 | 0+0 | 0 | 0+0 | 0 | 0+0 | 0 | 2+2 | 0 |
| 39 | FW | (Scotland) SCO | Scott Williamson | 4 | 4 | 0+0 | 0 | 0+0 | 0 | 0+0 | 0 | 0+0 | 0 | 4+0 | 4 |
| 42 | MF | (Scotland) SCO | Liam McLeish | 2 | 1 | 0+0 | 0 | 0+0 | 0 | 0+0 | 0 | 0+0 | 0 | 0+2 | 1 |
| 44 | MF | (Scotland) SCO | Zach Mauchin | 2 | 0 | 0+0 | 0 | 0+0 | 0 | 0+0 | 0 | 0+0 | 0 | 1+1 | 0 |
| 46 | MF | (Scotland) SCO | Andrew Lind | 2 | 0 | 0+0 | 0 | 0+0 | 0 | 0+0 | 0 | 0+0 | 0 | 0+2 | 0 |
| 47 | MF | (Scotland) SCO | Cameron Bruce | 8 | 0 | 1+1 | 0 | 0+0 | 0 | 0+0 | 0 | 0+0 | 0 | 5+1 | 0 |
| 48 | MF | (Republic of Ireland) IRL | Luca Connell | 30 | 8 | 24+5 | 8 | 0+0 | 0 | 0+0 | 0 | 1+0 | 0 | 0+0 | 0 |
| 49 | MF | (England) ENG | Ronan Darcy | 14 | 2 | 4+6 | 1 | 0+0 | 0 | 0+0 | 0 | 0+0 | 0 | 4+0 | 1 |
Players who left the club during the 2021–22 season
| 47 | MF | (Scotland) SCO | Dylan Reid | 4 | 0 | 0+3 | 0 | 0+0 | 0 | 0+0 | 0 | 0+0 | 0 | 1+0 | 0 |

== Team statistics ==
=== League table ===
| Pos | Team | Pld | W | D | L | GF | GA | GD | Pts | Promotion, qualification or relegation |
|---|---|---|---|---|---|---|---|---|---|---|
| 2 | Airdrieonians | 36 | 21 | 9 | 6 | 68 | 37 | +31 | 72 | Qualification for the Championship play-offs |
| 3 | Montrose | 36 | 15 | 14 | 7 | 53 | 36 | +17 | 59 | Qualification for the Championship play-offs |
| 4 | Queen's Park (O, P) | 36 | 11 | 18 | 7 | 51 | 36 | +15 | 51 | Qualification for the Championship play-offs |
| 5 | Alloa Athletic | 36 | 12 | 9 | 15 | 49 | 57 | −8 | 45 | |
| 6 | Falkirk | 36 | 12 | 8 | 16 | 49 | 55 | −6 | 44 | |

Rules for classification: 1) Points; 2) Goal difference; 3) Goals scored; 4) Head-to-to head points; 5) Head-to-head goal difference; 6) Play-off (only for deciding promotion, play-off participation and relegation).
(O) Play-off winners; (P) Promoted

=== League Cup table ===
| Pos | Team | Pld | W | PW | PL | L | GF | GA | GD | Pts | Qualification | MOT | QPK | QOS | AIR | ANN |
|---|---|---|---|---|---|---|---|---|---|---|---|---|---|---|---|---|
| 1 | Motherwell | 4 | 3 | 0 | 0 | 1 | 6 | 4 | +2 | 9 | Qualification for the second round | — | — | 3–2 | — | 2–0 |
| 2 | Queen's Park | 4 | 2 | 0 | 1 | 1 | 3 | 2 | +1 | 7 | | 0–1 | — | — | 0–0p | — |
| 3 | Queen of the South | 4 | 2 | 0 | 0 | 2 | 9 | 6 | +3 | 6 | | – | 0–1 | — | 4–1 | — |
| 4 | Airdrieonians | 4 | 1 | 1 | 1 | 1 | 4 | 5 | −1 | 6 | | 2–0 | — | — | — | 1–1p |
| 5 | Annan Athletic | 4 | 0 | 1 | 0 | 3 | 3 | 8 | −5 | 2 | | — | 1–2 | 1–3 | — | — |

Rules for classification: 1) goal difference, 2) goals scored, 3) away goals scored, 4) matches won, 5) away matches won, 6) drawing of lots.

=== Glasgow Cup table ===
| Pos | Team | Pld | W | D | L | GF | GA | GD | Pts | Qualification |
|---|---|---|---|---|---|---|---|---|---|---|
| 1 | Rangers B | 4 | 3 | 1 | 0 | 15 | 1 | +14 | 10 | Qualification for the semi-final |
| 2 | Queen's Park | 4 | 2 | 1 | 1 | 8 | 7 | +1 | 7 | Qualification for the semi-final |
| 3 | Celtic B | 4 | 1 | 3 | 0 | 10 | 5 | +5 | 6 | Qualification for the semi-final |
| 4 | Clyde | 4 | 1 | 1 | 2 | 5 | 14 | −9 | 4 | Qualification for the semi-final |
| 5 | Partick Thistle | 4 | 0 | 0 | 4 | 2 | 13 | −11 | 0 | |

Rules for classification: 1) Points; 2) Goal difference; 3) Goals scored; 4) Head-to-to head points; 5) Head-to-head goal difference.

== Transfers ==
=== Players in ===
| Player | From | Fee |
|---|---|---|
| (Scotland) Liam Brown | (Scotland) Edinburgh City | Undisclosed |
| (Scotland) Jake Davidson | (Scotland) Dundee United | Free |
| (Scotland) Lewis Moore | (Scotland) Heart of Midlothian | Free |
| (Scotland) Callum Yeats | (Scotland) Hibernian | Free |
| (England) Calum Ferrie | (Scotland) Dundee | Free |
| (England) Charlie Fox | (England) Bromley | Free |
| (Scotland) Scott Williamson | (Scotland) Cambuslang Rangers | Free |

=== Players out ===
| Player | To | Fee |
|---|---|---|
| (Scotland) Craig Slater | (Scotland) Forfar Athletic | Free |
| (Republic of Ireland) Canice Carroll | (England) Oxford City | Free |
| (Scotland) David Galt | (Scotland) Darvel | Free |
| (Scotland) Ross MacLean | (Scotland) Dumbarton | Free |

=== Loans in ===
| Player | From | Fee |
|---|---|---|
| (Scotland) Jack Thomson | (Scotland) Rangers | Loan |
| (Scotland) Connor Smith | (Scotland) Heart of Midlothian | Loan |
| (England) Luis Longstaff | (England) Liverpool | Loan |
| (Republic of Ireland) Luca Connell | (Scotland) Celtic | Loan |
| (Scotland) Connor McBride | (England) Blackburn Rovers | Loan |
| (Scotland) Dylan Reid | (Scotland) St Mirren | Loan |
| (England) Ronan Darcy | (England) Bolton Wanderers | Loan |

=== Loans out ===
| Player | To | Fee |
|---|---|---|
| (Scotland) Alex Bannon | (Scotland) Edinburgh University | Loan |
| (Scotland) Jacques Heraghty | (Scotland) Edinburgh University | Loan |
| (Scotland) Gregor Nicol | (Scotland) Bo’ness United | Loan |
| (Scotland) Callum Yeats | (Scotland) Stenhousemuir | Loan |
| (Scotland) Scott Williamson | (Scotland) Cambuslang Rangers | Loan |

== See also ==
- List of Queen's Park F.C. seasons
