= 2020–21 Queen's Park F.C. season =

Queen's Park
2020–21 season
- Chief Executive: Leeann Dempster
- Manager: Ray McKinnon
- Stadium: Hampden Park; Falkirk Stadium
- Scottish League Two: Winners
- Scottish Cup: Second round
- League Cup: Group stage
- Top goalscorer: League: Bob McHugh; Simon Murray (6 each); All: Simon Murray (7 goals)
Home colours	Away colours

The 2020–21 season was Queen's Park's third consecutive season in Scottish League Two and their first full season as a professional football club following the repeal of their amateur status. Queen's Park also competed in the League Cup and the Scottish Cup. On 2 October 2020, the SPFL confirmed that the Scottish Challenge Cup had been cancelled for the upcoming season.

== Summary ==
Queen's began their season on 6 October in the League Cup group stage with the League One season beginning on 17 October. On 11 January 2021, all football below the Scottish Championship was postponed due to the COVID-19 pandemic. On 29 January 2021, the suspension was extended until at least 14 February.

On 12 January 2021, the club unveiled former Hibernian CEO Leeann Dempster as their new chief executive.

In March 2021, the Scottish Government gave permission for the league to resume. On 16 March, clubs from League 1 and 2 voted to implement for a reduced 22-game season with a league split after 18 games.

Queen's Park played their last match at Hampden on 20 March 2021, as their lease on the ground expired at the end of the month. They are due to groundshare at the Falkirk Stadium for the rest of the 2020–21 season.

Queen's Park were confirmed as champions of League Two and secured their promotion to League One on 20 April 2021 following their 0–0 draw with Elgin City.

== Results and fixtures ==
Win Draw Loss Postponed

=== Scottish League Two ===
17 October 2020 1	Stirling Albion	0 – 0	Queen's Park	Forthbank Stadium
15:00		Report		Attendance: 0 Referee: Graham Grainger

24 October 2020 2	Queen's Park	2 – 0	Albion Rovers	Hampden Park
15:00	Baynham 5', 12'	Report		Attendance: 0 Referee: Matthew MacDermid

31 October 2020 3	Stranraer	0 – 1	Queen's Park	Stair Park
15:00		Report	MacLean 83'	Attendance: 0 Referee: Duncan Williams

7 November 2020 4	Elgin City	0 – 1	Queen's Park	Borough Briggs
15:00	Hester (red card) 90+4'	Report	Lyon 35'	Attendance: 0 Referee: Barry Cook

21 November 2020 5	Queen's Park	3 – 0	Brechin City	Hampden Park
15:00	Quitongo 6'; McHugh 24'; Lyon 69'	Report		Attendance: 0 Referee: Chris Graham

28 November 2020 6	Queen's Park	3 – 1	Stenhousemuir	Hampden Park
15:00	Kilday 39'; McHugh 87'; Murray 90+2'	Report	Biabi 11'	Attendance: 0 Referee: David Lowe

5 December 2020 7	Cowdenbeath	0 – 3	Queen's Park	Central Park
15:00		Report	Grant 17'; Gillespie 58'; Murray 90'	Attendance: 0 Referee: Calum Scott

12 December 2020 8	Queen's Park	3 – 3	Edinburgh City	Hampden Park
15:00	MacLean 49'; McHugh 53' (pen.); Baynham 72'	Report	Campbell 15', 57'; McGill 85'	Attendance: 0 Referee: Lloyd Wilson

19 December 2020 9	Annan Athletic	1 – 2	Queen's Park	Central Park
15:00	Currie 90+2' (pen.)	Report	McHugh 58'; Slater 66'	Attendance: 0 Referee: Lorraine Watson

20 March 2021 10	Queen's Park	3 – 0	Stranraer	Hampden Park
15:00	Doyle 20'; Kilday 30'; McHugh 65' (pen.)	Report	Millar (red card)	Attendance: 0 Referee: Duncan Williams

27 March 2021 11	Brechin City	0 – 2	Queen's Park	Glebe Park
15:00	Barr (red card)	Report	O’Connor 4' (o.g.); Longridge 15'	Attendance: 0 Referee: Peter Stuart

30 March 2021 12	Albion Rovers	0 – 3	Queen's Park	Cliftonhill
19:45		Report	Lyon 7'; Connell 31'; Kouider-Aissa 63'	Attendance: 0 Referee: David Dickinson

3 April 2021 13	Queen's Park	1 – 0	Stirling Albion	Falkirk Stadium
15:00	Meggatt 34' (o.g.)	Report		Attendance: 0 Referee: Dan McFarlane

6 April 2021 14	Queen's Park	3 – 0	Cowdenbeath	Falkirk Stadium
19:45	Quitongo 16'; Lyon 47'; Baynham 61'	Report		Attendance: 0 Referee: Stewart Luke

10 April 2021 15	Stenhousemuir	1 – 3	Queen's Park	Ochilview Park
15:00	Muir 69' (pen.)	Report	Murray 5'; McHugh 32'; Grant (red card) 46'; Longridge 48'	Attendance: 0 Referee: Chris Graham

13 April 2021 16	Queen's Park	1 – 0	Annan Athletic	Falkirk Stadium
19:00	Murray 41'	Report		Attendance: 0 Referee: Matthew MacDermid

17 April 2021 17	Edinburgh City	2 – 3	Queen's Park	Ainslie Park
12:00	Henderson 54'; Campbell 65'	Report	Grant 26'; Murray 78', 85'	Attendance: 0 Referee: Graham Grainger

20 April 2021 18	Queen's Park	0 – 0	Elgin City	Falkirk Stadium
19:45		Report		Attendance: 0 Referee: Steven Reid

23 April 2021 19	Queen's Park	0 – 1	Stranraer	Falkirk Stadium
19:00		Report	Yates 32'; Vitoria (red card) 90+3'	Attendance: 0 Referee: Barry Cook

27 April 2021 20	Stirling Albion	1 – 2	Queen's Park	Forthbank Stadium
19:00	Heaver 82'	Report	Kouider-Aissa 45+1', 65'	Attendance: 0 Referee: Dan McFarlane

29 April 2021 21	Queen's Park	2 – 0	Edinburgh City	Falkirk Stadium
19:00	Longridge 8'; Connell 59'	Report		Attendance: 0 Referee: Lloyd Wilson

4 May 2021 22	Elgin City	3 – 2	Queen's Park	Borough Briggs
19:00	Hester 49', 51', 76'	Report	Baynham 54'; Connell 87'	Attendance: 0 Referee: Duncan Williams

=== Scottish League Cup ===
==== Group stage ====
Results

10 October 2020 Group stage	Partick Thistle	2 – 0	Queen's Park	Glasgow
15:00	Cardle 66', 81'	Report		Stadium: Firhill Stadium; Attendance: 0 Referee: Kevin Graham

13 October 2020 Group stage	Greenock Morton	1 – 0	Queen's Park	Greenock
19:45	Blues 51'	Report		Stadium: Cappielow; Attendance: 0 Referee: Gavin Ross

10 November 2020 Group stage	Queen's Park	1 – 3	Queen of the South	Glasgow
19:45	Quitongo 2'	Report	East 22'; Joseph 32'; Maxwell 80'	Stadium: Hampden Park; Attendance: 0 Referee: Alan Newlands

14 November 2020 Group stage	Queen's Park	0 – 1	St Mirren	Glasgow
15:00		Report	Shaughnessy (red card) 49'; Obika 81'	Stadium: Hampden Park; Attendance: 0 Referee: Greg Aitken

Pos	Team	Pld	W	PW	PL	L	GF	GA	GD	Pts	Qualification	STM	QOS	PAR	GMO	QPK
1	St Mirren	4	2	2	0	0	8	4	+4	10	Qualification for the Second round	—	—	4–1	p1–1	—
2	Queen of the South	4	1	1	2	0	7	5	+2	7		2–2p	—	0–0p	—	—
3	Partick Thistle	4	1	2	0	1	3	4	−1	7		—	—	—	p0–0	2–0
4	Greenock Morton	4	1	0	3	0	4	3	+1	6		—	2–2p	—	—	1–0
5	Queen's Park	4	0	0	0	4	1	7	−6	0		0–1	1–3	—	—	—

Rules for classification: 1) points, 2) goal difference, 3) goals scored, 4) away goals scored, 5) matches won, 6) away matches won, 7) drawing of lots.

=== Scottish Cup ===
23 March 2021 First round	Dundonald Bluebell	1 – 3 (a.e.t.)	Queen's Park	Kelty
15:00	Wedderburn 90'	Report	Quitongo 48'; Murray 100'; Longridge 109'	Stadium: New Central Park; Attendance: 0 Referee: Scott Lambie

8 January 2021 Second round	Queen's Park	0 – 3	Queen of the South	Glasgow
19:45		Report	Gibson 45+1'; Fitzpatrick 66'; Shields 82'	Stadium: Hampden Park; Attendance: 0 Referee: Euan Anderson

== Player statistics ==
As of 4 May 2021 (UTC)

No.	Pos	Nat	Player	Total		League Two		League Cup		Scottish Cup	
No.	Pos	Nat	Player	Apps	Goals	Apps	Goals	Apps	Goals	Apps	Goals
1	GK	(Scotland) SCO	Willie Muir	27	0	21+0	0	4+0	0	2+0	0
3	DF	(England) ENG	Tommy Robson	17	0	13+0	0	3+0	0	1+0	0
4	DF	(Scotland) SCO	Lee Kilday	27	2	22+0	2	3+1	0	1+0	0
5	DF	(Scotland) SCO	Peter Grant	21	2	15+0	2	3+1	0	2+0	0
6	DF	(Scotland) SCO	Stuart Morrison	19	0	7+8	0	3+0	0	1+0	0
7	FW	(Scotland) SCO	Louis Longridge	22	4	15+3	3	2+0	0	1+1	1
8	MF	(Scotland) SCO	Craig Slater	4	1	3+1	1	0+0	0	0+0	0
9	FW	(Scotland) SCO	Bob McHugh	25	6	18+2	6	3+1	0	1+0	0
10	MF	(Scotland) SCO	David Galt	25	0	11+9	0	2+2	0	0+1	0
11	MF	(Scotland) SCO	Ross MacLean	26	2	9+12	2	1+2	0	2+0	0
12	DF	(Scotland) SCO	Darren Lyon	23	4	13+5	4	4+0	0	1+0	0
14	DF	(Scotland) SCO	Brody Paterson	15	0	9+2	0	2+1	0	1+0	0
15	MF	(Scotland) SCO	Max Gillies	1	0	1+0	0	0+0	0	0+0	0
17	GK	(Scotland) SCO	Jacques Heraghty	1	0	0+1	0	0+0	0	0+0	0
18	MF	(Scotland) SCO	Calum Biggar	5	0	1+1	0	0+3	0	0+0	0
19	FW	(Scotland) SCO	Jai Quitongo	18	4	9+5	2	1+1	1	1+1	1
20	FW	(Australia) AUS	Will Baynham	21	5	9+6	5	3+1	0	1+1	0
21	MF	(Scotland) SCO	Grant Gillespie	25	1	13+6	1	3+1	0	2+0	0
23	FW	(Scotland) SCO	Simon Murray	12	7	6+4	6	0+0	0	2+0	1
24	DF	(Scotland) SCO	Michael Doyle	27	1	22+0	1	4+0	0	1+0	0
28	DF	(Republic of Ireland) IRL	Canice Carroll	12	0	7+2	0	2+0	0	1+0	0
32	GK	(Scotland) SCO	Ryan Mullen	1	0	1+0	0	0+0	0	0+0	0
48	MF	(Republic of Ireland) IRL	Luca Connell	10	3	9+1	3	0+0	0	0+0	0
99	FW	(Scotland) SCO	Salim Kouider-Aissa	12	3	6+6	3	0+0	0	0+0	0
Players who left the club during the 2020–21 season
16	DF	(New Zealand) NZL	Michael McGlinchey	6	0	1+2	0	0+2	0	1+0	0
32	GK	(Scotland) SCO	Cammy Bell	0	0	0+0	0	0+0	0	0+0	0

== Team statistics ==
=== League table ===
Pos	Team	Pld	W	D	L	GF	GA	GD	Pts	Promotion, qualification or relegation
1	Queen's Park (C, P)	22	17	3	2	43	13	+30	54	Promotion to League One
2	Edinburgh City	22	12	2	8	40	27	+13	38	Qualification for the League One play-offs
3	Elgin City	22	12	2	8	39	28	+11	38	Qualification for the League One play-offs
4	Stranraer	22	11	5	6	36	25	+11	38	Qualification for the League One play-offs
5	Stirling Albion	22	10	6	6	32	22	+10	36	

Source: SPFL
Rules for classification: 1) Points; 2) Goal difference; 3) Goals scored; 4) Head-to-to head points; 5) Head-to-head goal difference; 6) Play-off (only for deciding promotion, play-off participation and relegation).
(C) Champions; (P) Promoted

=== Division summary ===
Round	1	2	3	4	5	6	7	8	9	10	11	12	13	14	15	16	17	18	19	20	21	22
Ground	A	H	A	A	H	H	A	H	A	H	A	A	H	H	A	H	A	H	H	A	H	A
Result	D	W	W	W	W	W	W	D	W	W	W	W	W	W	W	W	W	D	L	W	W	L
Position	5	4	1	1	1	1	1	1	1	1	1	1	1	1	1	1	1	1	1	1	1	1

Updated to match(es) played on 4 May 2020. Source:
A = Away; H = Home; W = Win; D = Draw; L = Loss

== Transfers ==
=== Players in ===
Player	From	Fee
(Scotland) Bob McHugh	(Scotland) Greenock Morton	Free
(Scotland) Lee Kilday	(Scotland) Queen of the South	Free
(Scotland) Michael Doyle	(Scotland) Falkirk	Free
(Scotland) Stuart Morrison	(Scotland) Dunfermline Athletic	Free
(Scotland) Grant Gillespie	(Scotland) Ayr United	Free
(England) Tommy Robson	(Scotland) Partick Thistle	Free
(Scotland) Louis Longridge	(Scotland) Falkirk	Free
(Scotland) Simon Murray	(South Africa) Bidvest Wits	Free
(Australia) Will Baynham	(United States) UC Santa Barbara Gauchos	Free
(Scotland) Darren Lyon	(Scotland) Queen of the South	Free
(Scotland) Jai Quitongo	(Scotland) Dumbarton	Free
(New Zealand) Michael McGlinchey	(Australia) Central Coast Mariners	Free
(Republic of Ireland) Canice Carroll	(England) Stevenage	Free

=== Players out ===
Player	To	Fee
(Scotland) Salim Kouider-Aissa	(Scotland) Livingston	Free
(Italy) Alfredo Agyeman	(Scotland) BSC Glasgow	Free
(Scotland) Cammy Clark	(Scotland) Annan Athletic	Free
(Scotland) David Crawford	Retired	
(Scotland) Ryan Finnie	(Scotland) Berwick Rangers	Free
(Scotland) Cammy Foy	(Scotland) Cumbernauld Colts	Free
(Scotland) James Grant	(Scotland) Cumbernauld Colts	Free
(France) Joffrey Lidouren	(France) St-Pierre de Milizac	Free
(Scotland) Creag Little	(Scotland) Stenhousemuir	Free
(Scotland) Lewis Magee	(Scotland) Stirling Albion	Free
(Scotland) Luke Main	(Scotland) Cumbernauld Colts	Free
(Scotland) Kieran Moore	(Scotland) Stirling Albion	Free
(Scotland) Calvin McGrory	(Scotland) Queen of the South	Free
(Scotland) Jack Pardue	(Scotland) Annan Athletic	Free
(Scotland) Nicky Jamieson	(Scotland) Alloa Athletic	Free
(Scotland) Cammy Bell	Retired	
(New Zealand) Michael McGlinchey	(Scotland) Clyde	Free

=== Loans in ===
Player	From	Fee
(Scotland) Brody Paterson	(Scotland) Celtic	Loan
(Scotland) Salim Kouider-Aissa	(Scotland) Livingston	Loan
(Republic of Ireland) Luca Connell	(Scotland) Celtic	Loan
(Scotland) Ryan Mullen	(Scotland) Celtic	Loan

=== Loans out ===
Player	To	Fee
(Scotland) Reece McGuire	(Scotland) Rossvale	Loan
(Scotland) Euan Rodger	(Scotland) Rossvale	Loan

== See also ==
- List of Queen's Park F.C. seasons
