= Bruce Cameron =

Bruce Cameron may refer to:

- Bruce Cameron (bishop) (born 1941), former bishop and Primus of the Scottish Episcopal Church
- Bruce Cameron (guitarist) (1955–1999), American guitarist
- Bruce Cameron (weightlifter) (born 1941/42), New Zealand weightlifter
- W. Bruce Cameron (born 1960), American humor columnist

== See also ==
- Cameron Bruce (born 1979), Australian rules footballer
- Cameron Bruce (Scottish footballer)
