= Leeann =

Leeann is a given name. Notable people with the surname include:

- Leeann Chin (restaurateur) (1933–2010), Chinese-born American restaurateur
- Leeann Dempster, chief executive of Hibernian F.C.
- Leeann Tweeden (born 1973), American radio broadcaster, model and sports commentator
