= Lee Kilday =

Scottish footballer

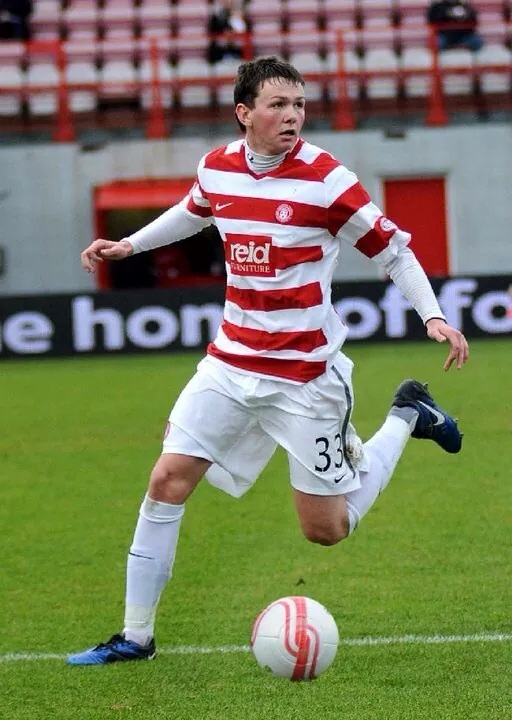
- Kilday playing for Hamilton Academical in 2011.

Personal information
- Date of birth: 4 February 1992 (age 34)
- Place of birth: Glasgow, Scotland
- Height: 1.85 m (6 ft 1 in)
- Position: Defender

Youth career
- Hamilton Academical

Senior career*
Years	Team	Apps	(Gls)
2011–2014	Hamilton Academical	33	(0)
2012	→ Stenhousemuir (loan)	3	(0)
2014–2019	Greenock Morton	117	(7)
2018	→ Airdrieonians (loan)	3	(0)
2019–2020	Queen of the South	25	(0)
2020–2023	Queen's Park	74	(3)
2023–2026	Hamilton Academical	72	(5)
- * Club domestic league appearances and goals as of 20:34, 12 May 2026 (UTC)

Lee Kilday (born 4 February 1992) is a Scottish professional footballer who plays as a defender. Having started his career with Hamilton Academical, Kilday also featured for Greenock Morton, Queen of the South and Queen's Park.

== Career ==
=== Hamilton Academical ===
Kilday made his senior debut for Hamilton Academical in the Scottish Premier League on 15 January 2011, in a 4–0 defeat versus Rangers at Ibrox. The performance of Kilday and other young players in that match, including Michael Devlin, who also made his debut, was praised by manager Billy Reid.

In March 2012, Kilday signed a contract with the Accies until May 2014. In May 2012, Kilday announced his intention to become a first-team regular at the Accies during the 2012–13 season.

In October 2012, Kilday was sent out on loan to Stenhousemuir.

In May 2014, Kilday was released by the Accies.

=== Greenock Morton ===
In June 2014, Kilday signed for Greenock Morton and was offered a one-year contract extension, after playing all 36 league matches for the Ton.

Following another successful season, Kilday signed a further two-year contract with the Greenock club and rejected a deal to return to the Accies. In August 2016, Kilday was appointed Ton's club captain at the age of twenty four.

In March 2018, to help aid his recovery from a long-term injury, Kilday was loaned out to Airdrieonians on an emergency loan deal. In June 2018, Kilday signed a one-year extension with the Ton.

=== Queen of the South ===
On 2 July 2019, Kilday signed a one-year contract with Dumfries club Queen of the South.

=== Queen's Park ===
On 16 July 2020, Kilday signed for Queen's Park after leaving the Doonhamers.

=== Return to Hamilton Academical ===
Following his release from Queen's Park, Kilday returned to Hamilton for his second spell with the club in June 2023.

== Honours ==
Morton

- Scottish League One: 2014–15

== Career statistics ==
As of 12 May 2026

Appearances and goals by club, season and competition
Club	Season	League			Scottish Cup		League Cup		Other		Total	
Club	Season	Division	Apps	Goals	Apps	Goals	Apps	Goals	Apps	Goals	Apps	Goals
Hamilton Academical	2010–11	Scottish Premier League	5	0	1	0	0	0	—		6	0
Hamilton Academical	2011–12	Scottish First Division	13	0	2	0	1	0	1 (Note: Appearances in the Scottish Challenge Cup)	0	17	0
Hamilton Academical	2012–13	Scottish First Division	5	0	0	0	1	0	0	0	6	0
Hamilton Academical	2013–14	Scottish Championship	10	0	0	0	1	0	2 (Note: One appearance in the Scottish Challenge Cup and one in the Premiership play-offs)	0	13	0
Hamilton Academical	Total		33	0	3	0	3	0	3	0	42	0
Stenhousemuir (loan)	2012–13	Second Division	3	0	0	0	0	0	0	0	3	0
Greenock Morton	2014–15	Scottish League One	36	3	3	0	2	0	3	0	44	3
Greenock Morton	2015–16	Scottish Championship	33	0	4	0	4	0	1	1	42	1
Greenock Morton	2016–17	Scottish Championship	22	4	3	0	5	0	1	0	31	4
Greenock Morton	2017–18	Scottish Championship	0	0	0	0	0	0	0	0	0	0
Greenock Morton	2018–19	Scottish Championship	33	0	3	0	4	0	0	0	40	0
Greenock Morton	Total		124	7	13	0	15	0	5	1	157	8
Airdrieonians (loan)	2017–18	Scottish League One	3	0	0	0	0	0	0	0	3	0
Queen of the South	2019–20	Scottish Championship	25	0	0	0	4	1	1	0	30	1
Queen's Park	2020–21	Scottish League Two	22	2	1	0	4	0	0	0	27	2
Queen's Park	2021–22	Scottish League One	22	1	0	0	0	0	3 (Note: Two appearances in Scottish Challenge Cup and one appearance in Scottish Championship play-offs)	0	25	1
Queen's Park	2022–23	Scottish Championship	30	0	0	0	3	2	4 (Note: Two appearances in Scottish Challenge Cup and two appearances in Scottish Premiership play-offs)	0	37	2
Queen's Park	Total		74	3	1	0	7	2	7	0	89	5
Hamilton Academical	2023–24	Scottish League One	26	1	0	0	4	0	6 (Note: Three appearances in Scottish Challenge Cup and three appearances in Scottish Championship play-offs)	0	36	1
Hamilton Academical	2024–25	Scottish Championship	11	1	0	0	3	0	0	0	14	1
Hamilton Academical	2025–26	Scottish League One	35	3	1	0	2	0	5	0	43	3
Hamilton Academical	Total		72	5	1	0	9	0	11	0	93	5
Career total			334	15	18	0	38	3	27	1	417	19
