= Marcel Oakley =

English footballer (born 2002)

Personal information
- Full name: Marcel Errol Emmanuel Oakley
- Date of birth: 30 October 2002 (age 24)
- Place of birth: Birmingham, England
- Height: 5 ft 11 in (1.80 m)
- Position: Defender

Team information
- Current team: Barrow
- Number: 2

Youth career
- –2021: Birmingham City

Senior career*
Years	Team	Apps	(Gls)
2021–2024	Birmingham City	4	(0)
2022–2023	→ Arbroath (loan)	16	(0)
2023	→ Queen's Park (loan)	13	(1)
2024–2025	Solihull Moors	29	(1)
2025–2026	Peterborough Sports	36	(2)
2026–	Barrow	0	(0)
- * Club domestic league appearances and goals as of 19:02, 16 June 2026 (UTC)

Marcel Errol Emmanuel Oakley (born 30 October 2002) is an English professional footballer who plays as a defender for National League club Barrow.

Oakley began his career with hometown club Birmingham City, for whom he made his senior debut in 2021. He spent the first half of the 2022–23 season on loan at Scottish Championship club Arbroath and the second half with divisional rivals Queen's Park. He was released by Birmingham at the end of the 2023–24 season, and joined Solihull Moors in October 2024.

== Career ==
=== Early life and career ===
Oakley was born in Birmingham, where he attended Ninestiles School in the Acocks Green district. He took up a two-year scholarship with Birmingham City's academy in July 2019. According to the then academy manager Kristjaan Speakman, Oakley "has the flexibility to play centre-back or right-back and is a very robust defender who excels in one v one duels in either position. His athletic qualities are improving and in possession as a right back he has the physical and technical qualities to join play in high areas of the pitch." He made his debut for Birmingham's under-23 team in February 2020, playing the whole of a 1–0 win against Derby County U23, and was a member of the team that finished as runners-up in the 2020–21 Professional Development League Northern Section, but did not play in the final against Sheffield United U23 which secured the overall title.

=== Birmingham City ===
Oakley was one of five second-year scholars offered their first professional contract in 2021, and one of four who accepted. He played in first-team pre-season friendlies – against Barrow, he "was an outlet down the right hand side behind Odin Bailey and mopped things up at the back, making a couple of important blocks in the process" – and was given squad number 52 for the 2021–22 season.

Oakley made his senior debut on 10 August, starting at right back in Birmingham's EFL Cup first-round match at home to Colchester United of League Two. After 75 minutes, he scored the only goal of the match: he "was fed down the right hand side and he proceeded to lash the ball home into the far corner, via a nick from a defender." His first Football League appearance came on 6 November when, with five senior defenders unavailable through injury and himself only recently returned to fitness, he started at right wing-back in a 2–1 defeat at home to Reading in the Championship. According to manager Lee Bowyer, "He was excellent. First half up and down, up and down and putting tackles, he's only a little lad, but he doesn't care, he just fights." He started again on 23 November in a goalless draw away to Coventry City, but suffered a foot injury that was to keep him out until the following February.

==== Loan to Arbroath ====
On 1 September 2022, Oakley joined Scottish Championship club Arbroath on loan until January 2023. He made his debut two days later at home to Partick Thistle, coming on after 78 minutes with the score goalless but with his side having had a player sent off; Arbroath conceded twice in the last few minutes. He played 16 league matches (19 in all competitions) and "turned in some energetic wing-back displays", but although Arbroath manager Dick Campbell wanted to keep him at the club, he returned to Birmingham when his loan expired.

==== Loan to Queen's Park ====
Oakley returned to football at the end of the January 2023 transfer window, signing for another Championship club, Queen's Park, on loan until the end of the season. He scored once from 13 starts at right back, and helped the team go into the last match of the regular season needing to beat Dundee to win the division and gain automatic promotion to the Scottish Premiership at their opponents' expense. They lost 5–3, and Oakley started in both legs of the play-off quarter-finals which Queen's Park lost heavily to Partick Thistle.

He was released by Birmingham when his contract expired at the end of the 2023–24 season.

=== Solihull Moors ===
Having been without a club since his release, Oakley signed a short-term contract with National League club Solihull Moors on 4 October 2024. The following day, he scored Moors' third goal in stoppage time in a 3–2 win away to Oldham Athletic. He became a regular in the starting eleven and, in January 2025, his contract was extended to the end of the season.

=== Peterborough Sports ===
In September 2025, Oakley joined National League North club Peterborough Sports.

=== Barrow ===
On 16 June 2026, Oakley joined Barrow on a two-year deal following their relegation to the National League.

== Career statistics ==
As of end of 2025–26 season

Appearances and goals by club, season and competition
Club	Season	League			National cup (Note: Includes FA Cup, Scottish Cup)		League cup (Note: Includes EFL Cup, Scottish League Cup)		Other		Total	
Club	Season	Division	Apps	Goals	Apps	Goals	Apps	Goals	Apps	Goals	Apps	Goals
Birmingham City	2021–22	EFL Championship	2	0	0	0	2	1	—		4	1
Birmingham City	2022–23	EFL Championship	0	0	0	0	0	0	—		0	0
Birmingham City	2023–24	EFL Championship	2	0	0	0	2	0	—		4	0
Birmingham City	Total		4	0	0	0	4	1	—		8	1
Arbroath (loan)	2022–23	Scottish Championship	16	0	1	0	—		2 (Note: Appearances in Scottish Challenge Cup)	0	19	0
Queen's Park (loan)	2022–23	Scottish Championship	13	1	—		—		2 (Note: Appearances in Scottish Premiership play-offs)	0	15	1
Solihull Moors	2024–25	National League	29	1	4	0	—		1 (Note: Appearance in FA Trophy)	0	34	1
Peterborough Sports	2025–26	National League North	36	2	2	1	—		2	0	40	3
Career total			98	4	7	1	4	1	7	0	116	6
