= Calum Ferrie =

English footballer

Personal information
- Date of birth: 19 June 1998 (age 28)
- Place of birth: Shrewsbury, England
- Height: 1.86 m (6 ft 1 in)
- Position: Goalkeeper

Team information
- Current team: Kilmarnock
- Number: 12

Youth career
- Port Vale

Senior career*
Years	Team	Apps	(Gls)
2015–2016	Port Vale	0	(0)
2015	→ Gresley (loan)		
2016–2021	Dundee	5	(0)
2018–2019	→ Stirling Albion (loan)	27	(0)
2020	→ Falkirk (loan)	0	(0)
2021–2026	Queen's Park	158	(0)
2026–	Kilmarnock	4	(0)
- * Club domestic league appearances and goals as of 09:30, 25 October 2026 (UTC)

Calum Ferrie (born 19 June 1998) is an English professional footballer who plays as a goalkeeper for Scottish Premiership club Kilmarnock.

A former youth team player at Port Vale, he played on loan at Gresley in 2015 before he turned professional at Dundee the following year. He made his first-team debut for Dundee in April 2018. He joined Stirling Albion on loan in June 2018 and became named the club's Player of the Year for the 2018–19 season. He joined Falkirk on loan in January 2020. Ferrie returned to Dundee the following season before leaving the club in 2021. He subsequently signed with Queen's Park and helped the club to win promotion out of Scottish League One via the play-offs in 2022, before being named on the PFA Scotland Scottish Championship Team of the Year for both 2022–23 and 2023–24. He played in the 2025 Scottish Challenge Cup final. In 2026, Ferrie moved to Scottish Premiership club Kilmarnock.

== Career ==
=== Port Vale ===
Ferrie was a youth team player at Port Vale when he moved on loan to Northern Premier League Division One South side Gresley in October 2015. He made his debut for Gresley in an FA Trophy qualification match at Matlock Town on 31 October. He featured in three further games for the club, his final appearance coming against Market Drayton Town on 28 November.

=== Dundee ===
After leaving Port Vale, Ferrie signed for Dundee in 2016. He made his senior debut in the Scottish Premiership in a 4–0 defeat away to Rangers on 7 April 2018. He appeared as a substitute for the injured Elliot Parish, and was praised by manager Neil McCann. After the match, Ferrie described himself as being "numb", and said that he wished to play more first-team games.

Ferrie was loaned to Scottish League Two club Stirling Albion in June 2018. He made 28 appearances for the Binos during the 2018–19 season. His efforts for the club were rewarded by being named Stirling's Young Player of the Year and Player of the Year.

Ferrie signed a one-year extension with Dundee on 15 May 2019. He was sent out on loan to Scottish League One side Falkirk on 31 January 2020, after signing another one-year extension with the "Dark Blues".

Ferrie earned his first league start for Dundee in three seasons on 24 October 2020, earning his first win and clean sheet for the club in a 1–0 win over Greenock Morton at Dens Park. However, Adam Legzdins was signed the following month, whilst number one Jack Hamilton returned to fitness, and Ferrie made just two further appearances in the 2020–21 campaign. He was on the bench for the play-off final win over Kilmarnock as Dundee secured promotion back into the Premiership, and was released upon the expiry of his contract in June.

=== Queen's Park ===
In July 2021, Ferrie signed for Scottish League One side Queen's Park as head coach Laurie Ellis looked to provide competition to established number one Willie Muir. Ferrie would become the club's starting goalkeeper midway through the 2021–22 season under new manager Owen Coyle, and would enjoy his second-successive promotion as Queen's Park won the Championship play-offs in May 2022 by beating Airdrieonians 3–2 on aggregate after extra time. At the end of a successful debut season, Ferrie would agree to extend his contract with the club until 2024.

Ferrie would have a stand out 2022–23 season with Queen's Park, starting every game for the side and being a key factor in the club's unexpected title challenge, and was named to PFA Scotland's Scottish Championship Team of the Year at the end of the league season. Ferrie marked his 100th appearance for the club with a clean sheet against Greenock Morton on 17 February 2024. A couple days later, Ferrie signed a new three-year contract with Queen's Park, keeping him at the club until June 2027. At the end of the 2023–24 campaign, he was named on the Scottish Championship Team of the Year for the second successive season.

On 9 February 2025, Ferrie earned plaudits in an upset Scottish Cup victory over Rangers, including a late penalty save to clinch a quarter-final berth. He played in the 2025 final of the Scottish Challenge Cup at Falkirk Stadium, which ended in a 5–0 defeat to Livingston. He played a total of 44 games in the 2024–25 campaign. He was linked with a move to Northern Irish club Coleraine in May 2025, where manager Ruaidhrí Higgins was reportedly tabling a bid and Queen's Park were said to be open to offers. He was named on the SPFL Team of the Week on 21 April 2026 after saving 11 shots to keep a clean sheet against Greenock Morton. He made 43 appearances across the 2025–26 campaign.

=== Kilmarnock ===
On 19 June 2026, Ferrie left Queen's Park to join Scottish Premiership club Kilmarnock on a two-year deal for an undisclosed fee.

== Career statistics ==
As of match played 24 October 2026

Appearances and goals by club, season and competition
Club	Season	League			Scottish Cup		League Cup		Other		Total	
Club	Season	Division	Apps	Goals	Apps	Goals	Apps	Goals	Apps	Goals	Apps	Goals
Dundee	2017–18	Scottish Premiership	2	0	0	0	0	0	0	0	2	0
Dundee	2018–19	Scottish Premiership	0	0	0	0	0	0	0	0	0	0
Dundee	2019–20	Scottish Championship	0	0	0	0	0	0	1 (Note: Appearance(s) in Scottish Challenge Cup)	0	1	0
Dundee	2020–21	Scottish Championship	3	0	0	0	0	0	0	0	3	0
Dundee	Total		5	0	0	0	0	0	1	0	6	0
Stirling Albion (loan)	2018–19	Scottish League Two	27	0	0	0	0	0	1	0	28	0
Falkirk (loan)	2019–20	Scottish League One	0	0	0	0	0	0	0	0	0	0
Queen's Park	2021–22	Scottish League One	23	0	1	0	1	0	6 (Note: Two appearances in Scottish Challenge Cup, four appearances in Scottish Championship play-offs)	0	31	0
Queen's Park	2022–23	Scottish Championship	36	0	2	0	4	0	5 (Note: Three appearances in Scottish Challenge Cup, two appearances in Scottish Premiership play-offs)	0	47	0
Queen's Park	2023–24	Scottish Championship	29	0	1	0	2	0	2	0	34	0
Queen's Park	2024–25	Scottish Championship	34	0	4	0	5	0	1	0	44	0
Queen's Park	2025–26	Scottish Championship	36	0	3	0	3	0	1	0	43	0
Queen's Park	Total		158	0	11	0	15	0	15	0	199	0
Kilmarnock	2026–27	Scottish Premiership	4	0	0	0	1	0	1	0	6	0
Career total			194	0	11	0	16	0	18	0	229	0

== Honours ==
Dundee

- Scottish Championship play-offs: 2020–21

Queen's Park

- Scottish League One play-offs: 2021–22
- Scottish Challenge Cup runner-up: 2024–25

Individual

- Stirling Albion Player of the Year: 2018–19
- PFA Scotland Team of the Year: 2022–23 Championship, 2023–24 Championship
