= Rico Quitongo =

Scottish footballer (born 1999)

Personal information
- Date of birth: 15 July 1999 (age 27)
- Place of birth: Wishaw, Scotland
- Height: 1.78 m (5 ft 10 in)
- Position: Defender

Team information
- Current team: Annan Athletic

Youth career
- Wishaw Wycombe Wanderers
- –2017: Hamilton
- 2018: Hearts

Senior career*
Years	Team	Apps	(Gls)
2017	Hamilton	0	(0)
2017	→ Bo'ness United (loan)		
2019–2021	Dumbarton	42	(0)
2021	Airdrieonians	10	(0)
2022	Peterhead	15	(0)
2022–2023	Queen of the South	11	(0)
2023	Clyde	4	(0)
2023–2025	Annan Athletic	12	(0)
- * Club domestic league appearances and goals as of 25 January 2025

Rico Quitongo (born 15 July 1999) is a Scottish professional footballer who plays as a defender for Annan Athletic.

== Early life ==
Quitongo was born on 15 July 1999 in Wishaw, Scotland. The son of Angolan footballer José Quitongo and the younger brother of Scottish U21 international Jai Quitongo, he attended Braidhurst High School in Scotland with his brother.

== Career ==
Quitongo started his career with Hamilton in 2017. The same year, he was sent on loan to Bo'ness United before joining the youth academy of Hearts in 2018. In 2019, he signed for Dumbarton. Scottish newspaper Dumbarton and Vale of Leven Reporter wrote in 2020 that he "capped off a solid debut season with the Sons by winning Young Player of the Year" while playing for the club.

Two years later, he signed for Airdrieonians. Subsequently, he signed for Peterhead in 2022. On 29 January 2022, he debuted for the club during a 1–1 home draw with East Fife in the league. Ahead of the 2022–23 season, he signed for Queen of the South. Following his stint there, he signed for Clyde in 2023. During the summer of 2023, he signed for Annan Athletic.
