= José Quitongo =

Angolan footballer (born 1974)

Personal information
- Full name: José Manuel Quitongo
- Date of birth: 18 November 1974 (age 51)
- Place of birth: Luanda, Portuguese Angola
- Height: 5 ft 8 in (1.73 m)
- Position: Winger

Youth career
- 1985–1992: Benfica

Senior career*
Years	Team	Apps	(Gls)
1992–1994	Benfica	0	(0)
1992–1993	→ Estoril (loan)	2	(0)
1994–1995	Waterford United	?	(?)
1995	Köping	20	(1)
1995	Darlington	1	(0)
1995–1997	Hamilton Academical	62	(9)
1997–1999	Heart of Midlothian	30	(3)
2000	Hamilton Academical	15	(1)
2000–2002	St Mirren	57	(7)
2002–2003	Kilmarnock	8	(0)
2003	Dibba Al-Hisn	?	(?)
2003–2004	Hamilton Academical	18	(5)
2004	Waterford United	17	(1)
2005–2006	Alloa Athletic	35	(5)
2006	Albion Rovers	1	(0)
2006	Partick Thistle	1	(0)
2006	Dumbarton	2	(1)
2006–2007	Pro Lissone	?	(?)
2007	Livingston	2	(0)
2007–2008	Stenhousemuir	10	(0)
2009–2010	Glenafton Athletic	?	(?)
2010	Pollok	2	(0)
2011	Lesmahagow	?	(?)
2013–2014	Muirkirk	?	(?)

Managerial career
- 2013–2014: Muirkirk
- * Club domestic league appearances and goals

José Manuel Quitongo (born 18 November 1974) is an Angolan footballer. A winger, he spent the majority of his playing career in Scotland, where he made 61 appearances in the Scottish Premier League for Heart of Midlothian, St Mirren and Kilmarnock, scoring five goals. Known as a journeyman due to the number of clubs he has represented, Quitongo featured prominently for Hamilton Academical in three separate stints with the side. In five seasons with Hamilton, he scored 15 goals in 95 Scottish Football League appearances.

Having left Angola when he was ten-years-old, Quitongo went on to play in Portugal, Republic of Ireland, Sweden, England, the United Arab Emirates, Italy and Scotland. He obtained a European Union passport while playing in Portugal.

== Career ==
Born in Luanda in Portuguese Angola, Quitongo began his career in Portugal with Benfica, playing 20 games, during his time at Benfica he played alongside Portuguese legends Rui Costa and Nuno Gomes He suffered a broken leg while playing for the club. Following his stint there, he signed for English side Darlington. He made just one appearance for Darlington before moving to Hamilton Academical in November 1995.

In October 1997 Quitongo moved to Hearts, playing 30 league games (mostly as substitute) before returning to Hamilton in January 2000. He moved to St Mirren in July 2000, making 57 league appearances before signing for Kilmarnock in August 2002. He made just nine appearances before leaving the club. After spells playing for Dibba Al-Hisn in the United Arab Emirates, he signed to Hamilton for a third time in October 2003, where he remained until the summer of 2004. He signed for League of Ireland club Waterford United for the remainder of the 2004 season.

In January 2005, he signed for Alloa Athletic, moving to Partick Thistle in March 2006. However, he made just one appearance, as a substitute, for Thistle before being released at the end of the season.

In April 2006 Quitongo was called up to the senior Angola squad. However, he missed out on selection for the 2006 FIFA World Cup. In August 2006 he signed for Dumbarton after playing in two games as a trialist, but made only three substitute appearances before leaving in June 2007.

In September 2007, Quitongo joined Livingston, but made only two substitute appearances before signing for Stenhousemuir in November. After being released by the club at the end of the 2007–08 season, Quitongo joined Junior club Glenafton Athletic at the start of 2009–10, but left the club in May 2010.

After a spell out of the professional game where he ran his own football academy in Blantyre, Quitongo was appointed player-manager of Muirkirk Juniors in December 2013. He left the club in October 2014. He signed for amateur Sunday team Budhill United in September 2016.

== Style of play ==
Quitongo played as a winger. He was known for his dribbling ability.

== Personal life ==
His sons Jai and Rico are both footballers.
