= Peter Grant (footballer, born 1994) =

Scottish footballer

Personal information
- Date of birth: 11 March 1994 (age 32)
- Place of birth: Bellshill, Scotland
- Height: 1.86 m (6 ft 1 in)
- Position: Defender

Senior career*
Years	Team	Apps	(Gls)
2011–2014	Peterborough United	0	(0)
2011–2012	→ Thurrock (loan)	2	(0)
2013–2014	→ Histon (loan)	22	(1)
2014–2018	Falkirk	101	(6)
2018–2019	Plymouth Argyle	6	(0)
2019	Carlisle United	4	(0)
2019–2020	Greenock Morton	16	(1)
2020–2022	Queen's Park	33	(3)
2022–2024	Clyde	36	(1)
2023	→ Dumbarton (loan)	15	(0)
- * Club domestic league appearances and goals as of 4 May 2024

Peter Grant (born 11 March 1994) is a Scottish professional footballer who plays as a defender.

== Career ==
Grant began his career with Peterborough United, but was unable to break into the first team and spent time on loan to Thurrock and Histon before being released by the club in May 2014.

In July 2014, Grant signed for Scottish Championship club Falkirk. In his first season at Falkirk, the club reached the Scottish Cup Final, where they played Inverness Caledonian Thistle. Grant scored in the final, making it 1–1, although Falkirk went on to lose 2–1. His second season at the club ended early when he suffered a cruciate ligament injury in a match against Livingston in January 2016. It was the second time Grant had sustained this injury, having injured his left knee as a seventeen-year-old at Peterborough. He was released by Falkirk after the 2017–18 season.

Grant signed for Plymouth Argyle in June 2018. Plymouth cancelled his contract by mutual consent in January 2019.

Grant then signed for League Two side Carlisle United until the end of the 2018–19 season, when he was released.

On 8 July 2019, Grant signed for Greenock Morton. After spells with Queen's Park and Clyde, Grant joined Dumbarton on loan in February 2023. On 13 July 2024, his contract with Clyde was cancelled by mutual agreement.

== Personal life ==
Grant is the son of Peter Grant, who played for Celtic in the 1980s and 1990s. His brother Ray is also a footballer.

== Career statistics ==
As of 20:10, 13 May 2023 (UTC)

Appearances and goals by club, season and competition
Club	Season	League			National Cup		League Cup		Other		Total	
Club	Season	Division	Apps	Goals	Apps	Goals	Apps	Goals	Apps	Goals	Apps	Goals
Peterborough United	2011–12	EFL Championship	0	0	0	0	0	0	0	0	0	0
Peterborough United	2012–13	EFL Championship	0	0	0	0	0	0	0	0	0	0
Peterborough United	2013–14	League One	0	0	0	0	0	0	0	0	0	0
Peterborough United	Total		0	0	0	0	0	0	0	0	0	0
Thurrock (loan)	2011–12	Conference South	2	0	0	0	—		0	0	2	0
Histon (loan)	2013–14	Conference South	22	1	0	0	—		0	0	22	1
Falkirk	2014–15	Scottish Championship	30	3	5	1	1	0	0	0	36	4
Falkirk	2015–16	Scottish Championship	23	0	1	0	3	1	1 (Note: Appearances in the Scottish Challenge Cup)	1	28	2
Falkirk	2016–17	Scottish Championship	21	1	0	0	0	0	1 (Note: Appearance in the Premiership play-offs)	0	22	1
Falkirk	2017–18	Scottish Championship	27	2	2	0	4	0	1	0	34	2
Falkirk	Total		101	6	8	1	8	1	3	1	120	9
Plymouth Argyle	2018–19	League One	6	0	0	0	0	0	3 (Note: Appearances in the EFL Trophy)	0	9	0
Carlisle United	2018–19	League Two	4	0	0	0	0	0	0	0	4	0
Greenock Morton	2019–20	Scottish Championship	12	1	2	0	4	1	1	0	19	2
Queen's Park	2019–20	Scottish League Two	8	1	0	0	0	0	0	0	8	1
Queen's Park	2020-21	Scottish League Two	15	2	1	0	4	0	0	0	15	2
Queen's Park	2021–22	Scottish League One	10	0	0	0	0	0	4	0	14	0
Queen's Park	Total		33	3	1	0	4	0	4	0	37	3
Clyde	2022–23	Scottish League One	21	0	1	0	4	0	3	0	29	0
Dumbarton	2022–23	Scottish League Two	15	0	0	0	0	0	2	0	17	0
Career total			162	8	10	1	12	2	9	1	193	12
