= Cameron Bruce (Scottish footballer) =

Scottish association football player

Cammy Bruce
Personal information
- Full name: Cameron Bruce
- Date of birth: 15 December 2005 (age 20)
- Height: 1.78 m (5 ft 10 in)
- Position: Defender

Team information
- Current team: Crusaders
- Number: 22

Youth career
- –2014: Bargeddie Colts
- 2014–2022: Queens Park

Senior career*
Years	Team	Apps	(Gls)
2022–2024	Queens Park	23	(1)
2024–2025	Airdrieonians	10	(0)
2026–	Crusaders	14	(0)

International career^{‡}
2022	Scotland U17	5	(0)
2022–2023	Scotland U18	5	(0)
2024	Scotland U19	1	(0)
- * Club domestic league appearances and goals as of 26 April 2026 ‡ National team caps and goals as of 16 February 2024

Cameron Bruce (born 15 December 2005) is a Scottish professional footballer who plays as defender for NIFL Premiership club Crusaders. He is a Scotland youth international.

== Career ==
From Glasgow, he joined Queens Park at under-9 level, having previously played for Bargeddie Colts. He signed his first professional contract with the club in 2022, as a 16-year-old, agreeing a two-year deal.

He made his senior debut for Queens Park in the Scottish League One on 12 March 2022, against Alloa Athletic. The following week, he made his first league start against Airdrieonians. Under manager Owen Coyle, his side achieved promotion that season.

He scored his first senior goal on 13 January 2024, in the Scottish Championship, against Raith Rovers.

On 18 June 2024, Bruce signed with Airdrieonians.

== International career ==
He is a Scotland youth international. On 8 February 2022, he made his debut for Scotland U17, against England U17.

== Style of play ==
A left-back, Bruce has been described as a "graceful" player by Queen's Park director of football Marijn Beuker. Beuker also described him as "a modern wing back, who possesses a lot of technical skills and game intelligence".

== Career statistics ==
=== Club ===
As of match played 22 March 2025

Appearances and goals by club, season and competition
Club	Season	League			Scottish Cup		Scottish League Cup		Other		Total	
Club	Season	Division	Apps	Goals	Apps	Goals	Apps	Goals	Apps	Goals	Apps	Goals
Queen's Park	2021–22	Scottish League One	2	0	—		—		—		2	0
Queen's Park	2022–23	Scottish Championship	1	0	0	0	0	0	1 (Note: Appearance(s) in Scottish Challenge Cup)	0	2	0
Queen's Park	2023–24	Scottish Championship	20	1	1	0	3	0	1	0	25	1
Queen's Park	Total		23	1	1	0	3	0	2	0	29	1
Airdrieonians	2024–25	Scottish Championship	9	0	1	0	4	0	2	0	16	0
Airdrieonians	2025–26	Scottish Championship	0	0	0	0	0	0	0	0	0	0
Airdrieonians	Total		9	0	1	0	4	0	2	0	16	0
Career total			32	1	2	0	7	0	4	0	45	1
