= Euan Henderson (footballer) =

Scottish footballer (born 2000)

Personal information
- Full name: Euan Drennan Henderson
- Date of birth: 29 June 2000 (age 26)
- Place of birth: Edinburgh, Scotland
- Height: 1.78 m (5 ft 10 in)
- Position: Forward

Team information
- Current team: Partick Thistle
- Number: 10

Youth career
- Hutchison Vale
- 2014–2017: Heart of Midlothian

Senior career*
| Years | Team | Apps | (Gls) |
| 2017–2023 | Heart of Midlothian | 39 | (3) |
| 2018–2019 | → Montrose (loan) | 31 | (5) |
| 2021–2022 | → Alloa Athletic (loan) | 28 | (14) |
| 2023 | → Queen's Park (loan) | 10 | (0) |
| 2023–2025 | Hamilton Academical | 67 | (12) |
| 2025-2026 | Airdrieonians | 35 | (10) |
| 2026– | Partick Thistle | 13 | (4) |
- * Club domestic league appearances and goals as of 18:33, 21 November 2026 (UTC)

Euan Drennan Henderson (born 29 June 2000) is a Scottish footballer who plays as a forward for Scottish Championship club Partick Thistle.

== Career ==
Henderson joined Hearts at under-15 level from Hutchison Vale, and made his debut against Celtic in May 2017.

He was loaned to Montrose for most of the 2018–19 season.

Henderson scored his first goal for the Hearts first team in a Scottish Cup match against Airdrie on 18 January 2020.

He moved on loan to Alloa Athletic in September 2021. He was recalled in January 2022.

On 27 January 2023, Henderson joined Scottish Championship club Queen's Park on loan until the end of the season. Queen's Park used Henderson in a Scottish Cup match against Inverness CT on 31 January, even though he had been signed by the club after the original scheduled date for the tie. This was a breach of the competition rules, and Queen's Park were ejected from the cup after a disciplinary hearing.

Following his release from Hearts, Henderson signed for Scottish League One side Hamilton Academical in June 2023.

After his contract expired at Hamilton in June 2025, he joined Airdrieonians FC. In the first match of the season he scored twice against Ross County, to give Airdrie a draw after being 2-0 down.

=== Partick Thistle ===
In June 2026, Henderson joined fellow Scottish Championship club Partick Thistle signing a two year deal.

Henderson scored on his Thistle debut in a 6–0 home win over Brechin City in a Scottish League Cup group stage tie.

In October 2026, Henderson scored a hat-trick in a 3–0 home win over Stenhousemuir which sent Thistle top of the Scottish Championship.

== Career statistics ==
As of 11 November 2022

Appearances and goals by club, season and competition
| Club | Season | League | | | Scottish Cup | | League Cup | | Other | | Total | |
| Club | Season | Division | Apps | Goals | Apps | Goals | Apps | Goals | Apps | Goals | Apps | Goals |
|---|---|---|---|---|---|---|---|---|---|---|---|---|
| Heart of Midlothian | 2016–17 | Scottish Premiership | 1 | 0 | 0 | 0 | 0 | 0 | — | | 1 | 0 |
| Heart of Midlothian | 2017–18 | Scottish Premiership | 12 | 0 | 1 | 0 | 0 | 0 | — | | 13 | 0 |
| Heart of Midlothian | 2018–19 | Scottish Premiership | 0 | 0 | 0 | 0 | 0 | 0 | — | | 0 | 0 |
| Heart of Midlothian | 2019–20 | Scottish Premiership | 11 | 0 | 3 | 1 | 0 | 0 | — | | 14 | 1 |
| Heart of Midlothian | 2020–21 | Scottish Championship | 10 | 3 | 1 | 0 | 4 | 0 | — | | 15 | 3 |
| Heart of Midlothian | 2021–22 | Scottish Premiership | 2 | 0 | 0 | 0 | 3 | 0 | — | | 5 | 0 |
| Heart of Midlothian | 2022–23 | Scottish Premiership | 3 | 0 | 0 | 0 | 1 | 0 | 4 | 0 | 8 | 0 |
| Heart of Midlothian | Total | | 39 | 3 | 5 | 1 | 8 | 0 | 4 | 0 | 48 | 4 |
| Heart of Midlothian U20/U21 | 2017–18 | | — | | | | | | 1 (Note: Appearances for Hearts under 20s in the Scottish Challenge Cup in which age-restricted sides from the Scottish Premiership clubs compete against senior clubs) | 0 | 1 | 0 |
| Heart of Midlothian U20/U21 | 2018–19 | | — | | | | | | 1 | 0 | 1 | 0 |
| Heart of Midlothian U20/U21 | 2022–23 | | — | | | | | | 1 | 0 | 1 | 0 |
| Heart of Midlothian U20/U21 | Total | | 0 | 0 | 0 | 0 | 0 | 0 | 3 | 0 | 3 | 0 |
| Montrose (loan) | 2018–19 | Scottish League One | 31 | 5 | 0 | 0 | 0 | 0 | 1 (Note: Appearances in the Scottish Championship play-offs) | 0 | 32 | 5 |
| Alloa Athletic (loan) | 2021–22 | Scottish League One | 28 | 14 | 1 | 3 | 0 | 0 | 0 | 0 | 29 | 17 |
| Queen's Park (loan) | 2022–23 | Scottish Championship | 0 | 0 | 0 | 0 | — | | 0 | 0 | 0 | 0 |
| Career total | | | 98 | 22 | 6 | 4 | 8 | 0 | 8 | 0 | 112 | 26 |
