= Charlie Fox (footballer) =

English footballer

Personal information
- Full name: Charles John Fox
- Date of birth: 26 November 1998 (age 27)
- Place of birth: London, England
- Position: Left-back

Team information
- Current team: Queen's Park
- Number: 5

Youth career
- 2007–2018: Queens Park Rangers

Senior career*
Years	Team	Apps	(Gls)
2018–2019	Queens Park Rangers	0	(0)
2018–2019	→ Wycombe Wanderers (loan)	0	(0)
2019	→ Basingstoke Town (loan)	1	(0)
2019–2020	Hampton & Richmond	10	(0)
2020	Walton Casuals	5	(1)
2021	Bromley	12	(0)
2021–	Queen's Park	80	(6)
- * Club domestic league appearances and goals as of 26 October 2025

Charles John Fox (born 26 November 1998) is an English footballer who plays as a defender for Scottish Championship club Queen's Park.

== Club career ==
=== Queens Park Rangers ===
Joining Queens Park Rangers at the age of eight, Fox signed his first professional contract in May 2018.

On 30 August 2018, Fox made the move to League One side, Wycombe Wanderers on loan until January 2019. Five days later, he made his professional debut during a 1–0 away victory over Northampton Town in their EFL Trophy group-stage tie. Fox went onto appear just once more before returning to Queens Park Rangers in the new year.

On 22 February 2019, Fox was sent out on loan to non-league side, Basingstoke Town on a one-month deal.

On 1 May 2019, it was announced that Fox would leave Queens Park Rangers at the end of the 2018–19 season.

=== Non-League ===
On 1 August 2019, Fox joined National League South side Hampton & Richmond Borough. Fox then moved on just a month later to join Walton Casuals, scoring a last-minute winner on his debut.

On 5 April 2021, it was announced that Fox had joined National League side Bromley.

=== Queen's Park ===
Fox moved to Scottish club Queen's Park on 15 July 2021. He scored on his league debut for the club, a 1–1 draw against East Fife on 31 July. Fox played an instrumental part in Queen's Park's promotion to the Scottish Championship in May 2022, helping his side beat Airdrie 3-2 on aggregate. In June 2022, Fox extended his contract until the end of the 2022-23 season.

== Career statistics ==
As of 31 July 2021

Appearances and goals by club, season and competition
Club	Season	League			National Cup		League Cup		Other		Total	
Club	Season	Division	Apps	Goals	Apps	Goals	Apps	Goals	Apps	Goals	Apps	Goals
Queens Park Rangers	2018–19	Championship	0	0	0	0	0	0	—		0	0
Wycombe Wanderers (loan)	2018–19	League One	0	0	0	0	0	0	2 (Note: Appearances in EFL Trophy)	0	2	0
Basingstoke Town (loan)	2018–19	Southern League Premier Division South	1	0	0	0	—		0	0	1	0
Hampton & Richmond Borough	2019–20	National League South	10	0	0	0	—		0	0	10	0
Walton Casuals	2019–20	Southern League Premier South	5	1	0	0	—		0	0	5	1
Bromley	2020–21	National League	12	0	—		—		1 (Note: Appearance in National League play-offs)	0	13	0
Queen's Park	2021–22	Scottish League One	1	1	0	0	1	0	0	0	2	1
Career total			29	2	0	0	1	0	3	0	33	2
