= Stuart Morrison =

Scottish footballer

Personal information
- Full name: Stuart Morrison
- Date of birth: 18 April 1999 (age 27)
- Place of birth: Scotland
- Position: Centre back

Team information
- Current team: Arbroath
- Number: 2

Youth career
- 2007–: Dunfermline Athletic
- –2016: Fife Elite Football Academy
- 2016–2017: Dunfermline Athletic

Senior career*
Years	Team	Apps	(Gls)
2017–2020	Dunfermline Athletic	5	(0)
2017–2018	→ Edinburgh City (loan)	21	(0)
2019–2020	→ Queen's Park (loan)	7	(0)
2020–2022	Queen's Park	27	(0)
2022–2023	Queen of the South	5	(0)
2023–2026	Forfar Athletic	90	(15)
2026–	Arbroath	0	(0)

International career^{‡}
2014	Scotland U19	9	(0)
- * Club domestic league appearances and goals as of 17 October 2026 ‡ National team caps and goals as of 17:00, 6 May 2023 (UTC)

Stuart Morrison (born 18 April 1999) is a Scottish footballer who plays as a centre back for Scottish Championship club Arbroath. Morrison has previously played for Dunfermline Athletic, Edinburgh City, Queen's Park, Queen of the South and Forfar Athletic. Morrison has also represented Scotland at U19 level.

== Career ==
Morrison, who attended Inverkeithing High School, started his career with Dunfermline Athletic's youth academy from the age of eight years old. Morrison was then with Fife's Elite Football Academy before re-signing with the Pars in May 2016. Morrison was then sent out on loan to Scottish League Two club Edinburgh, where he spent the 2017-18 season, where he played 23 times for the Citizens.

For the majority of the 2018-19 season, Morrison was playing with the Pars reserve team, although he was also an unused substitute for a number of first-team matches. On 14 August 2018, Morrison debuted for the first-team in a Scottish Challenge Cup match versus Inverness Caledonian Thistle, his boyhood club that he supported, where he played the entire match in a 2–1 away win. Morrison had his league debut, also against the Caley Jags on the final day of the 2018–19 season. Morrison then signed a new one-year deal with the Pars in May 2019. In February 2020, Morrison signed on loan with Queen's Park until the end of the 2019-20 season. In June 2020, Morrison was released by the Pars at the end of his contract.

On 11 August 2020, Morrison signed a permanent deal with Queen's Park.

On 31 May 2022, Morrison signed a one-year contract with Scottish League One club Queen of the South.

On 9 June 2023, Morrison signed a one-year contract with Forfar Athletic.

On 13 June 2026, Morrison signed a two-year deal with Scottish Championship side Arbroath.

== Career statistics ==
As of 10 June 2023

Appearances and goals by club, season and competition
Club	Season	League			FA Cup		League Cup		Other		Total	
Club	Season	Division	Apps	Goals	Apps	Goals	Apps	Goals	Apps	Goals	Apps	Goals
Dunfermline Athletic	2017–18	Scottish Championship	0	0	0	0	0	0	0	0	0	0
Dunfermline Athletic	2018–19	Scottish Championship	1	0	0	0	0	0	1 (Note: Appearances in the Scottish Challenge Cup)	0	2	0
Dunfermline Athletic	2019–20	Scottish Championship	4	0	0	0	4	0	0	0	8	0
Dunfermline Athletic	Total		5	0	0	0	4	0	1	0	10	0
Edinburgh (loan)	2017–18	Scottish League Two	21	0	1	0	0	0	1	0	23	0
Queen's Park (loan)	2019–20	Scottish League Two	7	0	0	0	0	0	0	0	7	0
Queen's Park	2020–21	Scottish League Two	15	0	0	0	3	0	0	0	18	0
Queen's Park	2021-22	Scottish League One	12	0	1	0	4	0	1	0	18	0
Queen's Park	Total		27	0	1	0	7	0	1	0	36	0
Queen of the South	2022-23	Scottish League One	5	0	0	0	2	0	0	0	7	0
Forfar Athletic	2023-24	Scottish League Two	0	0	0	0	0	0	0	0	0	0
Career total			65	0	2	0	13	0	3	0	83	0
