= Darren Lyon =

Scottish footballer

Personal information
- Date of birth: 8 June 1995 (age 31)
- Position: Midfielder

Team information
- Current team: Clyde
- Number: 20

Youth career
- Rangers
- 2010–2014: Hamilton Academical

Senior career*
Years	Team	Apps	(Gls)
2014–2018	Hamilton Academical	61	(3)
2018–2019	Peterborough United	2	(0)
2019–2021	Queen of the South	21	(0)
2020–2021	→ Queen's Park (loan)	18	(4)
2021–2022	Queen's Park	10	(0)
2022–2023	Kelty Hearts	29	(2)
2023–24	Arbroath	17	(0)
2024–	Clyde	0	(0)
- * Club domestic league appearances and goals as of 01:46, 28 July 2024 (UTC)

Darren Lyon (born 8 June 1995) is a Scottish professional footballer who plays as a midfielder for Scottish League Two club Clyde.

He previously played for Arbroath, Hamilton Academical, Peterborough United, Queen of the South, Queen's Park and Kelty Hearts.

== Career ==
Lyon started his career in the Rangers youth academy and then signed for Hamilton Academical, hoping for first-team football. Lyon debuted for Accies on 15 February 2014.

In April 2015, Lyons signed a new contract with the Accies until the 2017 close season. In November 2015, it was revealed that Lyon would be out of action for six weeks following knee surgery. On 18 November 2017, Lyon scored the Accies second goal in their 2–0 win versus Rangers, marking the Lanarkshire club's first win at Ibrox since 1987.

Lyon departed the Accies in August 2018 after his contract was mutually terminated.

Later in August 2018, Lyon signed a one-year contract with EFL League One club Peterborough United. Lyon was released by the Posh at the end of the 2018–19 season.

On 16 August 2019, Lyon signed a one-year contract with Dumfries club Queen of the South.

On 25 September 2020 he signed for Queen's Park.

Lyon signed for Kelty Hearts in August 2022. He left the club at the end of the 2022–23 season.

Scottish Championship club Arbroath signed Lyon in September 2023.

Lyon signed a two-year contract with Clyde on 28 July 2024.

== Career statistics ==
As of 17 July 2024

Appearances and goals by club, season and competition
Club	Season	League			National Cup		League Cup		Other		Total	
Club	Season	Division	Apps	Goals	Apps	Goals	Apps	Goals	Apps	Goals	Apps	Goals
Hamilton Academical	2013–14	Scottish Championship	1	0	0	0	0	0	0	0	1	0
Hamilton Academical	2014–15	Scottish Premiership	14	0	0	0	2	0	0	0	16	0
Hamilton Academical	2015–16	Scottish Premiership	13	0	1	0	0	0	0	0	14	0
Hamilton Academical	2016–17	Scottish Premiership	5	1	0	0	1	0	1 (Note: Appearance in the Premiership play-offs)	0	7	1
Hamilton Academical	2017–18	Scottish Premiership	27	2	1	0	2	0	0	0	30	2
Hamilton Academical	2018–19	Scottish Premiership	1	0	0	0	3	0	0	0	4	0
Hamilton Academical	Total		61	3	2	0	8	0	1	0	72	3
Peterborough United	2018–19	EFL League One	2	0	0	0	0	0	2	0	4	0
Queen of the South	2019–20	Scottish Championship	22	0	1	0	0	0	1	0	24	0
Queen's Park	2020–21	Scottish League Two	18	4	0	0	4	0	0	0	22	4
Queen's Park	2021–22	Scottish League One	10	0	0	0	2	0	5 (Note: Two appearances in Scottish Challenge Cup and three appearances in the League One play-offs)	0	17	0
Queen's Park	Total		28	4	0	0	6	0	5	0	39	4
Kelty Hearts	2022–23	Scottish League One	29	2	1	0	0	0	3 (Note: Appearance(s) in Scottish Challenge Cup)	0	33	2
Arbroath	2023–24	Scottish Championship	17	0	0	0	0	0	1 (Note: Appearance(s) in Scottish Challenge Cup)	0	18	0
Clyde	2024–25	Scottish League Two	0	0	0	0	1	0	0	0	1	0
Career total			159	9	4	0	15	0	13	0	191	6
