= Grant Gillespie (footballer) =

Scottish footballer (born 1991)

Personal information
- Date of birth: 2 July 1991 (age 35)
- Place of birth: Bellshill, Scotland
- Position: Midfielder

Team information
- Current team: Greenock Morton
- Number: 21

Youth career
- 2006–2009: Hamilton Academical

Senior career*
Years	Team	Apps	(Gls)
2009–2018	Hamilton Academical	199	(4)
2018	Dundee United	6	(0)
2018–2019	Raith Rovers	27	(2)
2019	Derry City	8	(1)
2020	Ayr United	4	(0)
2020–2022	Queen's Park	40	(3)
2022–	Greenock Morton	114	(12)
- * Club domestic league appearances and goals as of 4 May 2026

Grant Gillespie (born 2 July 1991) is a Scottish professional footballer who plays as a midfielder for Scottish Championship club Greenock Morton. He has previously played for Hamilton Academical, Dundee United, Raith Rovers, Derry City, Ayr United and Queen's Park.

== Career ==
=== Hamilton Academical ===
Gillespie made his senior debut for Hamilton Academical on 15 August 2009, in a Scottish Premier League match against Kilmarnock. In May 2011, he signed a new two-year contract with Hamilton.

In May 2012, Gillespie urged manager Billy Reid to make him a first-team regular for the forthcoming 2012–13 season. In January 2012, after making an "impact" as a substitute in the previous game, Gillespie spoke publicly about his desire to start the team's next match. In February 2013, he commented that he wanted a win in the upcoming derby against Airdrieonians. In April 2013, Gillespie signed a new two-year contract with the club.

In August 2013 Gillespie stated that the team needed to "dig in and grind out results" in the season ahead. In October 2014 he signed a new contract with the club, to last until the summer of 2018. Gillespie left the club in January 2018.

=== Dundee United ===
Gillespie signed a short-term contract with Dundee United. He was released by the club at the end of his contract in May 2018.

=== Raith Rovers ===
Gillespie signed with League One club Raith Rovers in June 2018.

=== Derry City ===
In July 2019 he signed for Derry City. After making 10 appearances, scoring 1 goal, he left in January 2020.

=== Ayr United ===
In January 2020 he returned to Scotland, signing for Ayr United until the end of their season.

=== Queen's Park ===
In August 2020 he signed for Queen's Park, before leaving in 2022.

=== Greenock Morton ===
In June 2022 he signed for Greenock Morton. Gillespie was named club captain by manager Dougie Imrie, and made his first competitive appearance against Hibernian in the League Cup Group Stage. Gillespie would score 2 times in this group, against Hibernian and Bonnyrigg Rose respectively. Gillespie would continue his positive start to life at Morton by scoring in the first league game of the season against his former club Hamilton.

Gillespie signed a contract extension on New Year's Day, keeping him at the club until summer 2024.

With Gillespie's contract expiring summer 2024, Morton announced that he had signed a new one-year contract.

== Career statistics ==
As of match played 14 September 2024

Appearances and goals by club, season and competition
Club	Season	League			National cup (Note: Includes Scottish Cup, FAI Cup)		League cup (Note: Includes Scottish League Cup, League of Ireland Cup)		Other		Total	
Club	Season	Division	Apps	Goals	Apps	Goals	Apps	Goals	Apps	Goals	Apps	Goals
Hamilton Academical	2009–10	Scottish Premier League	1	0	0	0	0	0	—		1	0
Hamilton Academical	2010–11	Scottish Premier League	17	0	1	0	1	0	—		19	0
Hamilton Academical	2011–12	Scottish First Division	16	0	1	0	1	0	1 (Note: Appearance(s) in Scottish Challenge Cup)	0	19	0
Hamilton Academical	2012–13	Scottish First Division	32	1	2	1	2	0	0	0	36	2
Hamilton Academical	2013–14	Scottish Championship	33	1	1	0	2	0	5 (Note: One appearance in Scottish Challenge Cup, four in Scottish Premiership play-offs)	0	41	1
Hamilton Academical	2014–15	Scottish Premiership	36	0	1	0	4	0	—		41	0
Hamilton Academical	2015–16	Scottish Premiership	30	1	1	0	0	0	—		31	1
Hamilton Academical	2016–17	Scottish Premiership	31	1	4	0	5	0	1 (Note: Appearance in Scottish Premiership play-offs)	0	41	1
Hamilton Academical	2017–18	Scottish Premiership	3	0	0	0	4	0	—		7	0
Hamilton Academical	Total		199	4	11	1	19	0	7	0	236	5
Dundee United	2017–18	Scottish Championship	6	0	1	0	0	0	0	0	7	0
Raith Rovers	2018–19	Scottish League One	27	2	3	0	3	1	4 (Note: Two appearances in Scottish Challenge Cup, two appearances in Scottish Championship play-offs)	0	37	3
Derry City	2019	League of Ireland Premier Division	8	1	2	0	2	0	—		12	1
Ayr United (loan)	2019–20	Scottish Championship	5	0	1	0	—		—		6	0
Queens Park	2020–21	Scottish League Two	19	1	1	0	4	0	0	0	24	1
Queens Park	2021–22	Scottish League One	21	2	1	0	4	0	3	3	29	5
Queens Park	Total		40	3	2	0	8	0	3	3	45	3
Greenock Morton	2022–23	Scottish Championship	32	8	2	1	3	2	1	0	38	11
Greenock Morton	2023–24	Scottish Championship	29	2	3	1	5	1	2	0	39	4
Greenock Morton	2024–25	Scottish Championship	4	0	0	0	4	0	0	0	8	0
Greenock Morton	Total		65	10	5	2	12	3	3	0	85	15
Career total			350	20	25	3	44	4	17	3	428	27
