= Alex Bannon =

Scottish footballer (born 2002)

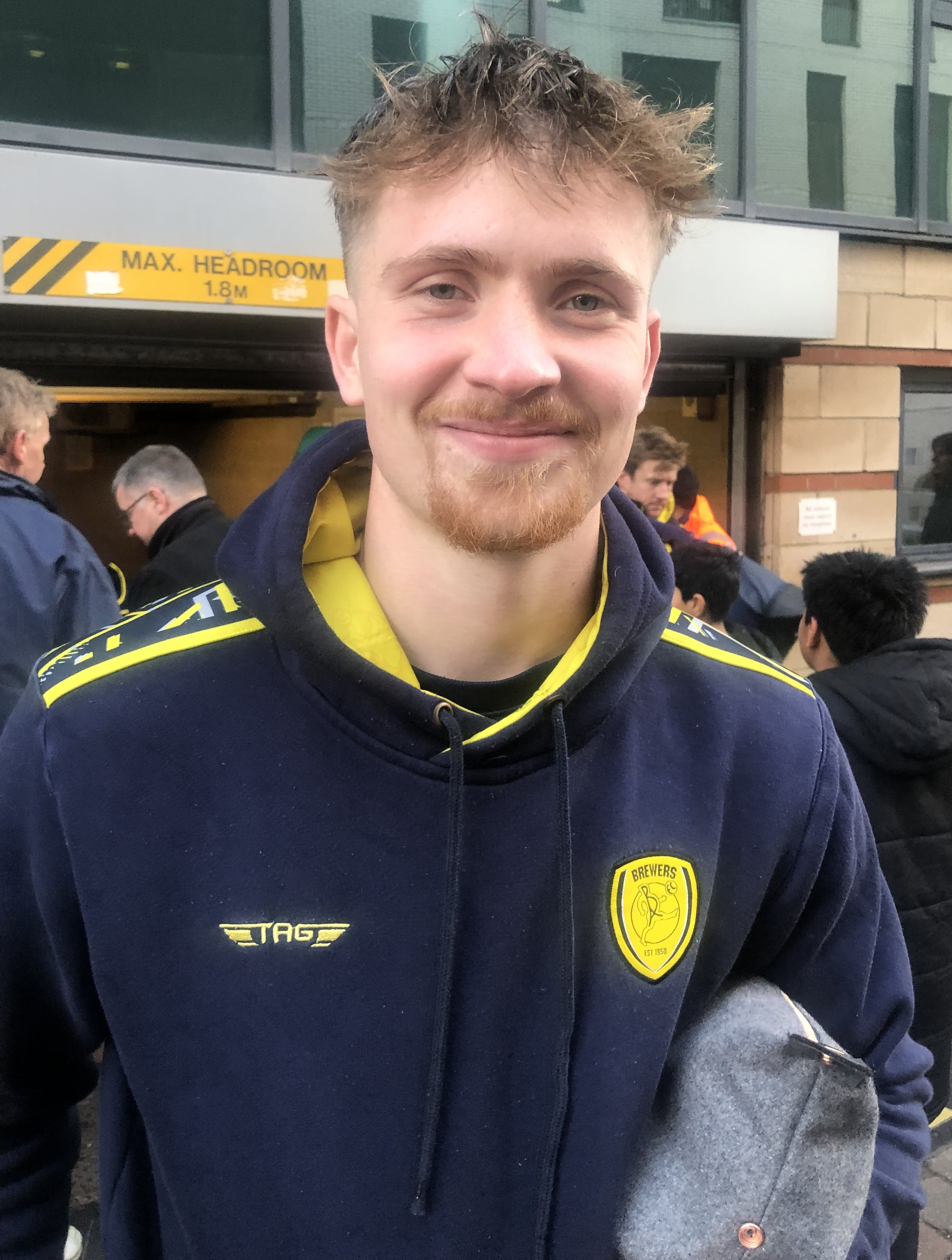
- Bannon in 2026

Personal information
- Date of birth: 16 September 2003 (age 23)
- Position: Defender

Team information
- Current team: Cliftonville

Youth career
- Parkmoor
- 2012–2021: Queen's Park

Senior career*
Years	Team	Apps	(Gls)
2021–2024	Queen's Park	45	(1)
2021–2022	→ Edinburgh University (loan)		
2024–2026	Burton Albion	9	(0)
2025	→ Airdrieonians (loan)	12	(0)
2025–2026	→ Derry City (loan)	13	(3)
2026–	Cliftonville	0	(0)
- * Club domestic league appearances and goals as of 22:53, 6 August 2026 (UTC)

Alex Bannon (born 16 September 2003) is a Scottish professional footballer who plays as a defender for NIFL Premiership club Cliftonville.

== Career ==
Bannon joined Queen's Park at the age of 9 from Parkmoor, spending time on loan at Edinburgh University before turning professional in 2022. He extended his contract in February 2024.

Bannon made his senior debut for Queen's Park in July 2022, coming off the bench against Dundee in the League Cup.

He signed for Burton Albion in July 2024 for an undisclosed fee, signing a contract until June 2028. He missed the first few weeks of the season due to injury. Bannon captained the side on his debut against Notts County in the EFL Trophy in September 2024, and made his Football League debut on 1 October 2024, in a 3–0 away defeat to Reading.

In February 2025 he returned to Scotland, signing on loan for Airdrieonians. He helped the team avoid relegation to League One in the play-offs.

On 2 July 2025, Bannon moved on a 12-month loan to Derry City. He expressed enthusiasm over the move, hoping to challenge at the top of the table and in European competition. He made his debut on 12 July, coming on as a substitute in a 2–0 defeat to Sligo Rovers. He scored on his full debut a week later against Treaty United in the FAI Cup. He departed the club at the end of his loan spell on 1 July 2026 and became a Free agent after his parent club Burton Albion opted not to renew his contract.

On 17 July 2026, Bannon signed for NIFL Premiership club Cliftonville.

== Style of play ==
Predominantly a centre-back, Bannon can also play as a right-back and as a defensive midfielder, and he is known for his composure on the ball, ability to initiate play from the back, and tactical versatility.
