= Lewis Moore (footballer) =

Scottish footballer

Personal information
- Date of birth: 4 June 1998 (age 28)
- Place of birth: Bathgate, Scotland
- Position: Winger

Team information
- Current team: Kelty Hearts
- Number: 7

Youth career
- Heart of Midlothian

Senior career*
Years	Team	Apps	(Gls)
2016–2021	Heart of Midlothian	22	(0)
2016–2017	→ Cowdenbeath (loan)	32	(3)
2018–2019	→ Forfar Athletic (loan)	29	(2)
2019	→ Falkirk (loan)	2	(0)
2021	→ Arbroath (loan)	7	(0)
2021–2023	Queen's Park	16	(0)
2023–	Kelty Hearts	87	(12)
- * Club domestic league appearances and goals as of 19 October 2026

Lewis Moore (born 4 June 1998) is a Scottish footballer who plays as a winger for Scottish League Two club Kelty Hearts. He has previously played for Heart of Midlothian, Cowdenbeath, Forfar Athletic, Falkirk, Queen's Park and Arbroath.

== Career ==
=== Heart of Midlothian ===
Moore won the Heart of Midlothian U17s Player of the Year award in April 2015 and made his debut for the senior team in the final game of the 2015–16 season in a draw against St. Johnstone. He spent the following season on loan at Cowdenbeath where he scored his first goal in the Scottish Professional Football League against Forfar.

After being loaned to Forfar for the 2018–19 season, Moore was loaned to Falkirk in August 2019. His loan move to Falkirk was ended early.

Moore was loaned to Arbroath in February 2021.

=== Queen's Park ===
On 21 June 2021, Moore signed for Queen's Park on a permanent basis.

=== Kelty Hearts ===
On 1 July 2023, Moore signed for Kelty Hearts on a permanent basis.

== Career statistics ==
As of matches played 4 May 2024

Appearances and goals by club, season and competition
Club	Season	League			Scottish Cup		League Cup		Other		Total	
Club	Season	Division	Apps	Goals	Apps	Goals	Apps	Goals	Apps	Goals	Apps	Goals
Heart of Midlothian	2015–16	Scottish Premiership	1	0	0	0	0	0	—		1	0
Heart of Midlothian	2016–17	Scottish Premiership	0	0	0	0	0	0	0	0	0	0
Heart of Midlothian	2017–18	Scottish Premiership	15	0	1	0	0	0	—		16	0
Heart of Midlothian	2018–19	Scottish Premiership	0	0	0	0	0	0	0	0	0	0
Heart of Midlothian	2019–20	Scottish Premiership	6	0	2	0	0	0	0	0	8	0
Heart of Midlothian	2020–21	Scottish Championship	0	0	0	0	1	0	0	0	1	0
Heart of Midlothian	Total		22	0	3	0	1	0	0	0	26	0
Cowdenbeath (loan)	2016–17	Scottish League Two	32	3	0	0	2	0	3 (Note: One appearance in the Scottish Challenge Cup and two in the League Two play-offs)	0	37	3
Forfar Athletic (loan)	2018–19	Scottish League One	29	2	1	1	0	0	3 (Note: One appearance in the Scottish Challenge Cup and two in the League Two play-offs)	0	33	3
Falkirk (loan)	2019–20	Scottish League One	2	0	0	0	0	0	2 (Note: Appearances in the Scottish Challenge Cup)	0	4	0
Arbroath (loan)	2020–21	Scottish Championship	7	0	1	0	0	0	—		8	0
Queen's Park	2021–22	Scottish League One	12	0	1	0	4	0	3	0	20	0
Queen's Park	2022–23	Scottish Championship	4	0	0	0	3	1	1	0	8	1
Kelty Hearts	2023-24	Scottish League One	24	5	1	1	4	0	1	0	30	6
Career total			132	10	7	2	14	1	12	0	166	13
