= Liam Brown (footballer) =

Scottish footballer

Personal information
- Date of birth: 6 April 1999 (age 27)
- Place of birth: Glasgow, Scotland
- Height: 1.75 m (5 ft 9 in)
- Position: Midfielder

Youth career
- Queen's Park

Senior career*
Years	Team	Apps	(Gls)
2016–2017	Queen's Park	25	(1)
2017–2019	Motherwell	1	(0)
2019–2021	Edinburgh City	43	(4)
2021–2023	Queen's Park	32	(4)
2022–2023	→ Stenhousemuir (loan)	1	(0)
2023–2024	East Kilbride	14	(3)
2024–2025	Kelty Hearts	6	(1)
- * Club domestic league appearances and goals as of 1 June 2025

Liam Brown (born 6 April 1999) is a Scottish professional footballer who plays as a midfielder. He has previously played for Motherwell, Edinburgh City, Queen's Park, Stenhousemuir, East Kilbride and Kelty Hearts.

== Club career ==
Brown started his career at Queen's Park, making his debut at 17 in a 3–0 defeat at home to East Stirlingshire on 13 February 2016.

Brown signed for Motherwell in June 2017, initially to play in the under-20 side. He made his first team debut on 12 May 2018, as a substitute in a 3–0 win against Hamilton Academical.

He was released by Motherwell in 2019 and then spent two years with Edinburgh City. Brown returned to Queen's Park in June 2021, signing a three-year contract. Queen's Park paid a transfer fee to acquire Brown, which was the first time the formerly amateur club had done this in its 154-year history. He was loaned to Stenhousemuir early in the 2022–23 season.

In June 2023, Brown joined Lowland League side East Kilbride.

== Career statistics ==
As of match played 14 August 2018

Appearances and goals by club, season and competition
Club	Season	League			Scottish Cup		League Cup		Other		Total	
Club	Season	Division	Apps	Goals	Apps	Goals	Apps	Goals	Apps	Goals	Apps	Goals
Queen's Park	2015–16	Scottish League Two	9	1	0	0	0	0	4 (Note: Appearances in Scottish League One play-offs)	0	13	1
Queen's Park	2016–17	Scottish League One	16	0	1	0	3	0	3 (Note: Appearances in the Scottish Challenge Cup)	0	23	0
Queen's Park	Total		25	1	1	0	3	0	7	0	36	1
Motherwell	2017–18	Scottish Premiership	1	0	0	0	0	0	2 (Note: Appearances for Motherwell under-20s in the Scottish Challenge Cup)	0	3	0
Motherwell	2018–19	Scottish Premiership	0	0	0	0	1	0	1 (Note: Appearances for Motherwell under-21s in the Scottish Challenge Cup)	0	1	0
Motherwell	Total		1	0	0	0	0	0	3	0	4	0
Career total			26	1	1	0	3	0	10	0	40	1
