= Thomas Robson (footballer, born 1995) =

English footballer

Personal information
- Date of birth: 11 September 1995 (age 31)
- Place of birth: Stanley, England
- Height: 1.78 m (5 ft 10 in)
- Positions: Defender; winger

Team information
- Current team: Dumbarton
- Number: 34

Youth career
- –2012: Darlington
- 2012–2014: Sunderland

Senior career*
Years	Team	Apps	(Gls)
2014–2018	Sunderland	1	(0)
2017	→ Limerick (loan)	22	(0)
2018–2019	Falkirk	47	(2)
2019–2020	Partick Thistle	16	(0)
2020–2024	Queens Park	115	(6)
2024–2026	Clyde	64	(1)
2026–	Dumbarton	11	(0)
- * Club domestic league appearances and goals as of 20:22, 14 November 2026 (UTC)

Thomas Robson (born 11 September 1995) is an English footballer who plays as a defender for Scottish League Two club Dumbarton.

== Career ==
=== Sunderland ===
Robson began his career with local side Sunderland and progressed through the youth teams at the Stadium of Light and made his Premier League debut on 15 May 2016 in a 2–2 draw away at Watford. Robson had a short spell on loan at League of Ireland Premier Division side Limerick.

=== Falkirk ===
In December 2017, Robson agreed to join Scottish Championship side Falkirk from 1 January 2018 on an initial six-month contract. On 19 May 2018, Robson agreed a one-year extension with Falkirk.

=== Partick Thistle ===
Following Falkirk's relegation, Robson left the club in the summer of 2019 and subsequently signed for Partick Thistle on a one-year deal. Robson scored his first goal for The Jags in his second appearance. by opening the scoring in a 2–1 win over Queens Park in the Scottish League Cup group stages.

=== Queens Park ===
On 27 August 2020, Robson signed for Queens Park.

=== Clyde ===
After a successful, four-year spell at Queen's Park, Robson signed for Clyde on 5 July 2024.

=== Dumbarton ===
Robson joined Dumbarton in June 2026 on a two-year deal.

== Career statistics ==
As of 20:22, 14 November 2026 (UTC)

Appearances and goals by club, season and competition
Club	Season	League			National cup		League cup		Other		Total	
Club	Season	Division	Apps	Goals	Apps	Goals	Apps	Goals	Apps	Goals	Apps	Goals
Sunderland	2014-15	Premier League	0	0	0	0	0	0	—		0	0
Sunderland	2015-16	Premier League	1	0	0	0	0	0	—		1	0
Sunderland	2016-17	Premier League	0	0	0	0	0	0	—		0	0
Sunderland	2017-18	Championship	0	0	0	0	0	0	—		0	0
Sunderland	Total		1	0	0	0	0	0	—		1	0
Sunderland U21	2016-17	—			—		—		4 (Note: Appearance(s) in EFL Trophy)	0	4	0
Sunderland U21	2017-18	—			—		—		0	0	0	0
Sunderland U21	Total		—		—		—		4	0	4	0
Limerick (loan)	2017	LOI Premier Division	17	0	0	0	0	0	—		17	0
Falkirk	2017-18	Scottish Championship	18	2	3	0	0	0	0	0	21	2
Falkirk	2018-19	Scottish Championship	21	0	1	0	2	0	2 (Note: Appearance(s) in Scottish Challenge Cup)	0	26	0
Falkirk	Total		39	2	4	0	2	0	2	0	47	2
Partick Thistle	2019-20	Scottish Championship	16	0	2	0	6	1	4	0	28	1
Queen's Park	2020-21	Scottish League Two	14	0	1	0	3	0	—		18	0
Queen's Park	2021-22	Scottish League One	35	1	1	0	4	0	7 (Note: Three appearances in Scottish Challenge Cup, Four appearances in Scottish Championship play-offs)	0	47	1
Queen's Park	2022-23	Scottish Championship	36	4	2	0	4	0	3 (Note: One appearance in Scottish Challenge Cup, Two appearances in Scottish Premiership play-offs)	0	45	4
Queen's Park	2023-24	Scottish Championship	30	1	1	0	4	0	2	0	37	1
Queen's Park	Total		115	6	5	0	15	0	12	0	147	6
Clyde	2024-25	Scottish League Two	30	0	1	0	4	0	1	0	36	0
Clyde	2025–26	Scottish League Two	34	1	1	0	4	0	8	0	47	1
Clyde			64	1	2	0	8	0	9	0	83	1
Dumbarton	2026–27	Scottish League Two	11	0	1	0	4	0	3	0	19	0
Career total			263	9	14	0	35	1	34	0	346	10
