= Jai Quitongo =

Scottish footballer (born 1997)

Personal information
- Date of birth: 14 September 1997 (age 29)
- Place of birth: Wishaw, Scotland
- Height: 1.80 m (5 ft 11 in)
- Positions: Striker; winger

Youth career
- –2014: Hamilton Academical
- 2014–2015: Aberdeen
- 2015: Greenock Morton

Senior career*
Years	Team	Apps	(Gls)
2015–2018	Greenock Morton	35	(5)
2018	Partick Thistle	13	(1)
2019	Machine Sazi	8	(1)
2020	Dumbarton	6	(1)
2020–2022	Queen's Park	29	(3)
2022–2024	Greenock Morton	48	(2)
2024–2025	Marsaxlokk	15	(4)
2025–2026	Tarxien Rainbows	6	(0)
2026	Kerala Blasters	5	(0)

International career^{‡}
2016	Scotland U21	1	(0)
- * Club domestic league appearances and goals as of 08:47, 30 March 2026 (UTC) ‡ National team caps and goals as of 4 March 2019

Jai Quitongo (born 14 September 1997) is a Scottish professional footballer who plays as a winger.

He has previously played for Morton, Partick Thistle, Machine Sazi, Dumbarton and Queen's Park. Throughout his youth career, Quitongo played for Hamilton Academical and Aberdeen.

Quitongo has been capped once for the Scotland national under-21 team.

== Early life ==
Quitongo's father is ex-Hamilton Academical, Heart of Midlothian and St Mirren winger José Quitongo. His brother, Rico, plays as a left back for Scottish League Two club Annan athletic. Growing up, he attended Braidhurst High School in Scotland.

== Club career ==
=== Greenock Morton ===
After playing for the youth sides at Hamilton Academical and Aberdeen, Quitongo signed for Greenock Morton on a short-term deal in August 2015. He played under Scottish manager Jim Duffy while playing for the club. He was offered an 18-month extension in December 2015 and made his debut for the first team as a late substitute against Raith Rovers.

In December 2015, Quitongo signed a contract extension, making him contracted to the club until May 2017. His first goal for the club came against Kilmarnock in the League Cup and followed up with a winning strike against Hamilton Academical.

On 31 August 2016, Morton rejected a bid from Doncaster Rovers for Quitongo's services. Quitongo underwent knee surgery in January 2017. While recovering from the injury, he signed a new contract with Morton that ran until June 2018. He was offered a new one-year deal but this was rescinded in August 2018 and he was released from the club.

=== Partick Thistle ===
After agreeing compensation, due to his age, Quitongo joined Partick Thistle on a short-term deal until January 2019. Jai scored his first goal for the Jags in a 2-1 home defeat against Dundee United.

=== Machine Sazi ===
After leaving Thistle, in March 2019, Quitongo moved to Iranian side Machine Sazi on a four-year deal.

=== Dumbarton ===
He left Machine after just eight appearances and joined Scottish League One club Dumbarton on a short-term deal in January 2020, teaming up with his younger brother Rico and former manager at Greenock Morton Jim Duffy. He scored his first goal for the club against Forfar Athletic in March 2020. He left the club in July 2020 after six appearances and one goal.

=== Queen's Park ===
Quitongo signed for League Two club Queen's Park in October 2020.

=== Greenock Morton ===
On 20 July 2022, Quitongo returned to his first club, Greenock Morton, signing a one-year contract until the end of the season. He scored his first goal of the season in a 1–0 home win against Cove Rangers, and scored later in the season in a 1–1 draw with Ayr United. After the end of the season, Quitongo signed an extension to his contract, expiring in summer 2024.

== International career ==
On 31 October 2016, Quitongo was selected by coach Scot Gemmill for the Scotland under-21 squad. He debuted as a substitute in a friendly defeat away to Slovakia.

== Career statistics ==
As of 23:53, 7 March 2020 (UTC)

Appearances and goals by club, season and competition
Club	Season	League			Scottish Cup		League Cup		Other		Total	
Club	Season	Division	Apps	Goals	Apps	Goals	Apps	Goals	Apps	Goals	Apps	Goals
Greenock Morton	2015–16	Championship	6	0	1	0	0	0	0	0	7	0
Greenock Morton	2016–17	Championship	14	2	1	0	7	4	1 (Note: Appearances in the Scottish Challenge Cup)	0	23	6
Greenock Morton	2017–18	Championship	15	3	0	0	4	1	1	0	20	4
Greenock Morton	Greenock Morton total		35	5	2	0	11	5	2	0	50	10
Partick Thistle	2018–19	Championship	13	1	0	0	0	0	0	0	13	1
Dumbarton	2019–20	League One	6	1	0	0	0	0	0	0	6	1
Career total			54	7	2	0	11	5	2	0	69	12

== Honours ==
Morton

- SPFL Development League West: Winners 2015–16
