= Leeann Dempster =

Scottish football executive

- Occupation: Football executive
- Known for: Chief executive of Motherwell (2009–2014); Chief executive of Hibernian (2014–2020); Chief executive of Queen's Park (2021–2024)

Leeann Dempster is a Scottish football executive. She was the Chief Executive (CEO) of Queen's Park, having previously held the same position at Motherwell and Hibernian.

== Early life and early career ==
Dempster grew up in the East End of Glasgow and left home and school at 17.

== Career ==
Dempster worked in advertising before becoming sales and marketing director for Zoom Airlines for two years.

After the airline's collapse, John Boyle, co-founder of the airline and owner of Motherwell FC, recruited Dempster, first as general manager, then chief executive. In her time at Motherwell, the team finished second in the Scottish Premiership twice, and third once, reaching the qualifying rounds for the 2012–13 UEFA Champions League.

She moved to Hibernian in June 2014. The club won the Scottish Cup in 2016, for the first time since 1902. They achieved promotion to the Scottish Premiership in 2017, and subsequently finished in the top six twice.

On 26 November 2020, it was announced that Dempster would step down as CEO of Hibernian, after six years. On 12 January 2021, Queen's Park announced Dempster was to join the club as Chief Executive.

It was announced in January 2024 that she would leave Queen's Park on good terms.

== Other appointments ==
In 2018, Dempster was appointed chair of the Regional Enterprise Council, a business and third-sector body linked to the Edinburgh & South East Scotland City Region Deal.

== Personal life ==
Dempster was brought up in the East End of Glasgow by a Catholic mother and a Protestant father. Her family supported Rangers. Before her professional involvement in football, Dempster had been a Rangers season ticket holder but had long since let her attendance lapse.

Dempster has spoken about realising she was gay in her 20s. She entered into a civil partnership in 2007.
