= 2024–25 Livingston F.C. season =

Livingston
2024–25 season
- Chairman: John Ward (until 16 May); Calvin Ford
- Manager: David Martindale
- Stadium: Almondvale Stadium
- Championship: Second place (promoted via play-offs)
- Premiership play-offs: Winners
- Scottish Cup: Quarter-finals
- League Cup: Group stage
- Challenge Cup: Winners
- Top goalscorer: League: Robbie Muirhead (13); All: Robbie Muirhead (19)
- Average home league attendance: 1,808
Home colours	Away colours

The 2024–25 season was Livingston's first season in the Scottish Championship, following their relegation from the Premiership at the end of the 2023–24 season. Livingston also competed in the League Cup, Challenge Cup and the Scottish Cup.

== Season summary ==
On 19 March 2024, Livingston announced that their nine-year stadium sponsorship agreement with restaurant chain Tony Macaroni would come to a "natural close" at the end of the 2023–24 season. On 10 April a local taxi firm, Home of the Set Fare, was announced as the club's new stadium sponsor as part of a six-figure deal.

Livingston enjoyed a bright start to the campaign, with League Cup wins over Forfar Athletic, Dunfermline Athletic and Cove Rangers, before a shock defeat at the hands of SPFL League Two side Spartans saw Livi eliminated from the competition on goal difference.

Despite this setback, the Lions made a strong start in the league, with two wins and two draws ensuring they went unbeaten in August.

In September they played in the Challenge Cup for the first time since the 2017–18 season and took the opportunity to take revenge on Spartans, winning 2–0.

On 16 May 2025, Livingston revealed that they had been the subject of a takeover led by the great-great-grandson of American industrialist Henry Ford. Calvin Ford was subsequently announced as the club's new chairman and majority shareholder after buying out 100% of previous owner John McIlvogue's stake in the club.

== Results & fixtures ==
Win Draw Loss Postponed

=== Friendlies ===
22 June 2024	Livingston	2–1	Alloa Athletic	Almondvale Stadium
15:00	Clarke 47'; Kelly 72'	Report	Rankin 74'

25 June 2024	Livingston	2–1	Broxburn Athletic	Almondvale Stadium
19:45	Trialist 27'; Kelly 47'	Report	Brass 44'	Referee: Alastair Grieve

29 June 2024	The Spartans	0–0	Livingston	Ainslie Park
15:00		Report		Referee: Iain Snedden

2 July 2024	Kelty Hearts	1–5	Livingston	New Central Park
19:45	Trialist 84'	Report	Trialist 39'; Trialist 51'; Trialist 64', 80'; Nottingham 67'

6 July 2024	Motherwell	2–1	Livingston	Fir Park
15:00	Blaney 29'; Ebiye 38'	Report	Yengi 59'

=== Scottish Championship ===
3 August 2024 1	Livingston	2–0	Dunfermline Athletic	Almondvale Stadium
15:00	Pittman 49'; Kelly 71'	Report		Attendance: 1,917; Referee: Craig Napier

10 August 2024 2	Queen's Park	1–1	Livingston	Lesser Hampden
15:00	Rudden 36'	Report	Clarke 60'	Attendance: 881; Referee: Graham Grainger

24 August 2024 3	Livingston	1–1	Greenock Morton	Almondvale Stadium
15:00	Pittman 54'	Report	Moffat 71' (pen.)	Attendance: 1,512; Referee: Euan Anderson

31 August 2024 4	Raith Rovers	0–1	Livingston	Stark's Park
15:00		Report	Brandon 90'	Attendance: 3,517; Referee: Colin Steven

14 September 2024 5	Livingston	3–0	Hamilton Academical	Almondvale Stadium
15:00	Pittman 56'; Muirhead 81', 87'	Report		Attendance: 1,241; Referee: Duncan Williams

28 September 2024 6	Livingston	2–1	Airdrieonians	Almondvale Stadium
15:00	Pittman 29'; Sole 90+1'	Report	Reid 31'	Attendance: 1,532; Referee: Kevin Clancy

5 October 2024 7	Partick Thistle	0–0	Livingston	Firhill Stadium
15:00		Report		Attendance: 3,668; Referee: Ryan Lee

8 October 2024 8	Falkirk	0–0	Livingston	Falkirk Stadium
19:45		Report		Attendance: 5,715; Referee: Euan Anderson

19 October 2024 9	Ayr United	1–2	Livingston	Somerset Park
15:00	McLennan 42'	Report	Muirhead 8'; Pittman 38'	Attendance: 2,470; Referee: Don Robertson

26 October 2024 10	Livingston	2–1	Raith Rovers	Almondvale Stadium
15:00	Wilson 75' (red card); Nottingham 90+5'	Report	Hamilton 21'; Dick (red card) 55'	Attendance: 1,750; Referee: Ross Hardie

29 October 2024 11	Dunfermline Athletic	3–0	Livingston	East End Park
19:45	Kane 7', 71'; Benedictus 56'	Report		Attendance: 4,810; Referee: Dan McFarlane

2 November 2024 12	Livingston	1–1	Queen's Park	Almondvale Stadium
15:00	May 50'	Report	Drozd 59'; MacGregor (red card) 63'	Attendance: 1,138; Referee: Duncan Nicolson

9 November 2024 13	Hamilton Academical	1–3	Livingston	New Douglas Park
19:45	O'Hara 42'	Report	May 40'; Smith 50'; Winter 90+2'	Attendance: 1,033; Referee: Grant Irvine

16 November 2024 14	Livingston	1–0	Falkirk	Almondvale Stadium
15:00	Yengi 41'	Report		Attendance: 3,745; Referee: Iain Snedden

7 December 2024 15	Greenock Morton	0–0	Livingston	Cappielow
15:00		Report		Attendance: 1,664; Referee: Grant Irvine

13 December 2024 16	Livingston	2–0	Partick Thistle	Almondvale Stadium
19:45	Yengi 7'; Muirhead 69'	Report		Attendance: 1,544; Referee: Graham Grainger

17 December 2024 17	Airdrieonians	0–3	Livingston	Excelsior Stadium
19:45		Report	May 35', 67'; Clarke 56'	Attendance: 1,433; Referee: Ryan Lee

21 December 2024 18	Livingston	0–1	Ayr United	Almondvale Stadium
15:00		Report	Oakley 41'	Attendance: 1,521; Referee: Duncan Williams

28 December 2024 19	Raith Rovers	2–1	Livingston	Stark's Park
15:00	Easton 7'; Connolly 28'	Report	May 65' (pen.)	Attendance: 3,955; Referee: Euan Anderson

4 January 2025 20	Queen's Park	2–0	Livingston	Hampden Park
15:00	Turner 38', 52'; Mauchin (red card) 72'	Report		Attendance: 1,266; Referee: Peter Stuart

14 January 2025 21	Livingston	2–1	Airdrieonians	Almondvale Stadium
19:45	Strapp 5' (o.g.); Fraser 59'	Report	Mochrie 13'	Attendance: 1,051; Referee: Dan McFarlane

25 January 2025 22	Livingston	3–0	Hamilton Academical	Almondvale Stadium
15:00	Muirhead 3'; Montaño 16'; Smith 90+2'	Report		Attendance: 1,078; Referee: Euan Anderson

31 January 2025 23	Falkirk	1–2	Livingston	Falkirk Stadium
19:45	Spencer 55' (pen.)	Report	Muirhead 13' (pen.); McAlear 45+4'	Attendance: 6,381; Referee: Graham Grainger

15 February 2025 24	Livingston	0–0	Dunfermline Athletic	Almondvale Stadium
15:00		Report		Attendance: 1,798; Referee: Duncan Nicolson

22 February 2025 25	Ayr United	1–2	Livingston	Somerset Park
15:00	Rus 73'	Report	Wilson 33'; Muirhead 90+6'	Attendance: 3,063; Referee: Don Robertson

25 February 2025 26	Livingston	3–2	Greenock Morton	Almondvale Stadium
19:45	Yengi 29'; Wilson 35'; Shinnie 37'	Report	Lyall 28'; McGinn 90+3'	Attendance: 1,050; Referee: Graham Grainger

28 February 2025 27	Partick Thistle	1–1	Livingston	Firhill Stadium
19:45	Graham 25'	Report	Muirhead 78'	Attendance: 2,946; Referee: Ryan Lee

5 March 2025 28	Livingston	0–0	Raith Rovers	Almondvale Stadium
19:45		Report		Attendance: 1,331; Referee: Calum Scott

15 March 2025 29	Airdrieonians	3–3	Livingston	Excelsior Stadium
15:00	McMaster 25'; Wilson 31'; McStravick 85'	Report	Muirhead 25'; Wilson 67'; Kelly 76'	Attendance: 1,580; Referee: Matthew MacDermid

25 March 2025 30	Livingston	1–0	Falkirk	Almondvale Stadium
19:45	Shinnie 88'	Report		Attendance: 3,827; Referee: Nick Walsh

2 April 2025 31	Dunfermline Athletic	1–0	Livingston	East End Park
19:45	Otoo 45'	Report		Attendance: 4,890; Referee: Grant Irvine

5 April 2025 32	Livingston	3–0	Queen's Park	Almondvale Stadium
19:45	Smith 14'; Muirhead 17'; Kelly 40'	Report		Attendance: 1,396; Referee: Dan McFarlane

12 April 2025 33	Greenock Morton	1–2	Livingston	Cappielow
15:00	Crawford 44'	Report	Montaño 17'; Pittman 23'	Attendance: 1,737; Referee: Ross Hardie

18 April 2025 34	Livingston	5–0	Ayr United	Almondvale Stadium
19:45	Kelly 6', 45'; Muirhead 33' (pen.); Montaño 79'; McAlear 90+1'	Report		Attendance: 1,606; Referee: Steven McLean

26 April 2025 35	Hamilton Academical	0–3	Livingston	New Douglas Park
15:00		Report	Muirhead 27' (pen.), 36'; Yengi 52'	Attendance: 1,155; Referee: Iain Snedden

2 May 2025 36	Livingston	0–1	Partick Thistle	Almondvale Stadium
19:45		Report	Tait 39' (o.g.)	Attendance: 4,500; Referee: Calum Scott

=== Premiership play-offs ===
13 May 2025 Semi-finals 1st leg	Partick Thistle	0–2	Livingston	Firhill Stadium
19:45		Report	Pittman 39'; Wilson 52'	Attendance: 5,470; Referee: Don Robertson

16 May 2025 Semi-finals 2nd leg	Livingston	2–0 (4–0 agg.)	Partick Thistle	Almondvale Stadium
19:45	Brandon 40'; May 67'	Report		Referee: Kevin Clancy

22 May 2025 Final 1st leg	Livingston	1–1	Ross County	Almondvale Stadium
20:00	Wilson 45+1'	Report	Hale 90+6' (pen.)	Attendance: 2,643; Referee: John Beaton

26 May 2025 Final 2nd leg	Ross County	2–4 (3–5 agg.)	Livingston	Victoria Park
20:00	Nisbet 7'; Hale 24'	Report	Smith 39'; Wilson 57'; Muirhead 61'; Yengi 90+7'	Attendance: 4,138; Referee: Nick Walsh

=== Scottish League Cup ===
==== Group stage ====
13 July 2024 Group Stage	Forfar Athletic	0–2	Livingston	Station Park
15:00		Report	Sole 49'; Muirhead 88'	Attendance: 538; Referee: Stewart Luke

20 July 2024 Group Stage	Livingston	1–0	Dunfermline Athletic	Almondvale Stadium
15:00	Muirhead 11'	Report		Attendance: 1,555; Referee: Colin Steven

23 July 2024 Group Stage	Cove Rangers	0–2	Livingston	Balmoral Stadium
19:45		Report	Murray 6' (o.g.); Sole 86'	Attendance: 243; Referee: Euan Anderson

27 July 2024 Group Stage	Livingston	0–1	The Spartans	Almondvale Stadium
15:00		Report	Russell 85'	Attendance: 848; Referee: Colin Steven

=== Scottish Challenge Cup ===
7 September 2024 Third round	The Spartans	0–2	Livingston	Ainslie Park
15:00		Report	May 65'; Smith 81'	Attendance: 681; Referee: Steven Kirkland

12 October 2024 Fourth round	Livingston	2–2 (5–4 p)	Inverness CT	Almondvale Stadium
14:00	May 17'; Pittman 28'	Report	Allan 10'; Gilmour 30'	Attendance: 943; Referee: Colin Steven

12 November 2024 Quarter-finals	Livingston	2–1	Greenock Morton	Almondvale Stadium
19:45	McAlear 6'; May 87'	Report	Samuels 90+3'	Attendance: 858; Referee: Chris Graham

5 February 2025 Semi-finals	Dunfermline Athletic	0–2	Livingston	East End Park
19:35		Report	Muirhead 41'; Yengi 89'	Attendance: 2,072; Referee: Duncan Williams

30 March 2025 Final	Queen's Park	0–5	Livingston	Falkirk Stadium
16:10		Report	Muirhead 26'; May 45'; Yengi 50'; Shinnie 82'; Brandon 90+1'	Attendance: 4,079; Referee: Calum Scott

=== Scottish Cup ===
30 November 2024 Third round	Livingston	2–0	Brora Rangers	Almondvale Stadium
15:00	McAlear 20'; Yengi 35'	Report		Attendance: 799; Referee: Colin Steven

18 January 2025 Fourth round	Ross County	2–3 (a.e.t.)	Livingston	Victoria Park
15:00	White 56'; Hale 73'	Report	Muirhead 45+1' (pen.); Montaño 62'; Shinnie 119'	Attendance: 1,802; Referee: Chris Graham

8 February 2025 Fifth round	Livingston	3–0	Cove Rangers	Almondvale Stadium
15:00	McGowan 25'; Yengi 81', 83'	Report		Attendance: 1,111; Referee: Matthew MacDermid

10 March 2025 Quarter-finals	Livingston	0–1	St Johnstone	Almondvale Stadium
19:45		Report	Carey 73'	Referee: Don Robertson

== Squad statistics ==
=== Appearances ===
As of 26 May 2025

No.	Pos	Nat	Player	Total		Championship + Play-offs		League Cup		Challenge Cup		Scottish Cup	
No.	Pos	Nat	Player	Apps	Goals	Apps	Goals	Apps	Goals	Apps	Goals	Apps	Goals
2	MF	(Republic of Ireland) IRL	Shaun Donnellan	0	0	0	0	0	0	0	0	0	0
3	DF	(Northern Ireland) NIR	Matthew Clarke	32	2	18+2	2	4	0	3+2	0	1+2	0
5	DF	(Australia) AUS	Ryan McGowan	53	1	40	0	4	0	5	0	4	1
6	MF	(Scotland) SCO	Reece McAlear	37	4	9+16	2	1+3	0	3+1	1	3+1	1
7	MF	(England) ENG	Liam Sole	20	3	3+9	1	2+2	2	2+1	0	0+1	0
8	MF	(Scotland) SCO	Scott Pittman	50	8	35+4	7	4	0	3	1	3+1	0
9	FW	(Australia) AUS	Tete Yengi	42	10	19+12	5	3+1	0	1+3	2	2+1	3
10	MF	(Scotland) SCO	Stephen Kelly	44	5	30+6	5	3	0	4	0	1	0
11	DF	(Scotland) SCO	Robbie Fraser	23	1	17+3	1	0	0	0	0	2+1	0
12	DF	(Scotland) SCO	Jamie Brandon	48	3	38	2	4	0	3	1	3	0
14	GK	(Scotland) SCO	Jack Hamilton	0	0	0	0	0	0	0	0	0	0
15	MF	(Scotland) SCO	Lewis Smith	42	5	17+14	4	2+2	0	2+3	1	1+1	0
17	FW	(Scotland) SCO	Stevie May	44	10	27+9	6	0	0	4+1	4	3	0
19	DF	(Northern Ireland) NIR	Daniel Finlayson	48	0	22+16	0	2	0	2+3	0	2+1	0
20	MF	(Nigeria) NGA	Meshack Ubochioma	6	0	0+4	0	0	0	0	0	0+2	0
21	DF	(Saint Kitts and Nevis) SKN	Michael Nottingham	36	1	22+5	1	0+4	0	4	0	1	0
22	MF	(Scotland) SCO	Andrew Shinnie	40	4	9+22	2	0+1	0	1+3	1	2+2	1
23	FW	(Scotland) SCO	Robbie Muirhead	48	19	31+6	14	4	2	3	2	3+1	1
25	MF	(Scotland) SCO	Macaulay Tait	22	0	18	0	0	0	2	0	2	0
26	MF	(Colombia) COL	Cristian Montaño	40	3	21+8	2	4	0	3+1	0	3	1
27	DF	(Scotland) SCO	Danny Wilson	29	7	22+2	7	0	0	2	0	3	0
28	GK	(France) FRA	Jérôme Prior	44	0	37	0	0	0	3	0	4	0
36	FW	(Scotland) SCO	Sam Culbert	1	0	0+1	0	0	0	0	0	0	0
40	MF	(Nigeria) NGA	Samson Lawal	6	0	0+2	0	0	0	2+1	0	1	0
Players who left the club during the season
1	GK	(England) ENG	Shamal George	7	0	3	0	4	0	0	0	0	0
4	DF	(England) ENG	Ben Jackson	1	0	0	0	0	0	0	0	0+1	0
11	FW	(England) ENG	Ricky Korboa	4	0	0+1	0	0+3	0	0	0	0	0
14	DF	(England) ENG	Miles Welch-Hayes	0	0	0	0	0	0	0	0	0	0
14	GK	(Brazil) BRA	Marcelo Pitaluga	2	0	0	0	0	0	2	0	0	0
14	GK	(Scotland) SCO	Jack Newman	0	0	0	0	0	0	0	0	0	0
16	FW	(Scotland) SCO	Andy Winter	23	1	0+15	1	1+2	0	1+2	0	0+2	0
17	MF	(South Africa) RSA	Aphelele Teto	0	0	0	0	0	0	0	0	0	0
18	MF	(England) ENG	Olly Green	8	0	0+1	0	2+2	0	1+1	0	0+1	0
34	FW	(Scotland) SCO	Lucas Stenhouse	0	0	0	0	0	0	0	0	0	0
37	MF	(Scotland) SCO	Tommy Sharp	0	0	0	0	0	0	0	0	0	0
39	MF	(England) ENG	David Carson	1	0	0+1	0	0	0	0	0	0	0

== Team statistics ==
=== League table ===
Pos	Team	Pld	W	D	L	GF	GA	GD	Pts	Promotion, qualification or relegation
1	Falkirk (C, P)	36	22	7	7	72	33	+39	73	Promotion to the Premiership
2	Livingston (O, P)	36	20	10	6	55	27	+28	70	Qualification for the Premiership play-off semi-final
3	Ayr United	36	18	9	9	57	39	+18	63	Qualification for the Premiership play-off quarter-final
4	Partick Thistle	36	15	10	11	43	38	+5	55	Qualification for the Premiership play-off quarter-final
5	Raith Rovers	36	15	8	13	47	43	+4	53	

Rules for classification: 1) Points; 2) Goal difference; 3) Goals scored; 4) Head-to-to head points; 5) Head-to-head goal difference; 6) Play-off (only for deciding promotion, play-off participation and relegation).
(C) Champions; (O) Play-off winners; (P) Promoted

=== League Cup table ===
Pos	Team	Pld	W	PW	PL	L	GF	GA	GD	Pts	Qualification	SPA	LIV	FOR	DNF	COV
1	The Spartans	4	3	0	0	1	7	3	+4	9	Qualification for the second round	—	—	1–0	0–3	—
2	Livingston	4	3	0	0	1	5	1	+4	9		0–1	—	—	1–0	—
3	Forfar Athletic	4	2	0	0	2	5	3	+2	6		—	0–2	—	—	3–0 (Note: Forfar Athletic were awarded a technical 3−0 win over Cove, who fielded an ineligible player. The match had originally finished 1–1, with Forfar securing the bonus point following a 3–1 win on penalties.)
4	Dunfermline Athletic	4	1	0	0	3	4	5	−1	3		—	—	0–2	—	1–2
5	Cove Rangers	4	1	0	0	3	2	11	−9	3		0–5	0–2	—	—	—

Rules for classification: 1) goal difference, 2) goals scored, 3) away goals scored, 4) matches won, 5) away matches won, 6) drawing of lots.

== Transfers ==
=== Players in ===
Player	From	Fee
(England) Liam Sole	(England) Maidstone United	Free
(Northern Ireland) Matthew Clarke	(Northern Ireland) Linfield	Free
(Scotland) Robbie Muirhead	(Scotland) Greenock Morton	Free
(England) Ricky Korboa	(England) Woking	Free
(Northern Ireland) Daniel Finlayson	(Northern Ireland) Linfield	Free
(France) Jérôme Prior	(France) Pau	Free
(Scotland) Lewis Smith	(Scotland) Hamilton Academical	Free
(Scotland) Reece McAlear	(England) Tranmere Rovers	Free
(England) Olly Green	(England) Hull City	Free
(Australia) Ryan McGowan	(Scotland) St Johnstone	Free
(Scotland) Andy Winter	(Scotland) Hamilton Academical	Free
(Scotland) Danny Wilson	(Scotland) Queen's Park	Free
(Scotland) Jack Hamilton	(Scotland) Ross County	Free

=== Players out ===
Player	To	Fee
(Scotland) Bruce Anderson	(Scotland) Kilmarnock	Free
(Wales) Morgan Boyes	(Scotland) Greenock Morton	Free
(Scotland) Mikey Devlin	(Scotland) Ayr United	Free
(England) Kurtis Guthrie	(India) Churchill Brothers	Free
(Scotland) Jason Holt	(Scotland) St Johnstone	Free
(Scotland) Jack Hamilton	(Scotland) Ross County	Free
(England) Joel Nouble	(China) Wuxi Wugo	Free
(England) Ayo Obileye	(China) Cangzhou Mighty Lions	Free
(Scotland) James Penrice	(Scotland) Heart of Midlothian	Free
(Scotland) Calan Ledingham	(Scotland) Gala Fairydean Rovers	Free
(Scotland) Steven Bradley	(Scotland) Hamilton Academical	Free
(Liberia) Mohammed Sangare	(Switzerland) AC Bellinzona	Free
(Scotland) Sean Kelly	(Cyprus) Karmiotissa	Free
(England) Shamal George	(England) Wycombe Wanderers	Undisclosed
(England) Ricky Korboa	(England) Maidenhead United	Free
(England) David Carson	(England) South Shields	Free
(England) Olly Green	(England) Boston United	Free

=== Loans in ===
Player	From	Fee
(England) Ben Jackson	(England) Brighton & Hove Albion	Loan
(Scotland) Stevie May	(Scotland) St Johnstone	Loan
(Brazil) Marcelo Pitaluga	(England) Liverpool	Loan
(Scotland) Robbie Fraser	(Scotland) Rangers	Loan
(Scotland) Jack Newman	(Scotland) Dundee United	Loan
(Nigeria) Meshack Ubochioma	(Scotland) Dundee United	Loan
(Scotland) Macaulay Tait	(Scotland) Heart of Midlothian	Loan

=== Loans out ===
Player	To	Fee
(Scotland) Che Reilly	(Scotland) East Stirlingshire	Loan
(South Africa) Aphelele Teto	(South Africa) Chippa United	Loan
(Scotland) Sam Culbert	(Scotland) Darvel	Loan
(Scotland) Lucas Stenhouse	(Scotland) Bo'ness United	Loan
(Scotland) Tommy Sharp	(Scotland) Gala Fairydean Rovers	Loan
(England) Miles Welch-Hayes	(England) Maidenhead United	Loan
(Scotland) Lucas Stenhouse	(Scotland) Bonnyrigg Rose	Loan
(Scotland) Andy Winter	(Scotland) Arbroath	Loan
(Scotland) Codi Stark	(Scotland) Bo'ness Athletic	Loan

== See also ==
List of Livingston F.C. seasons
