= Michael Nottingham =

Footballer (born 1989)

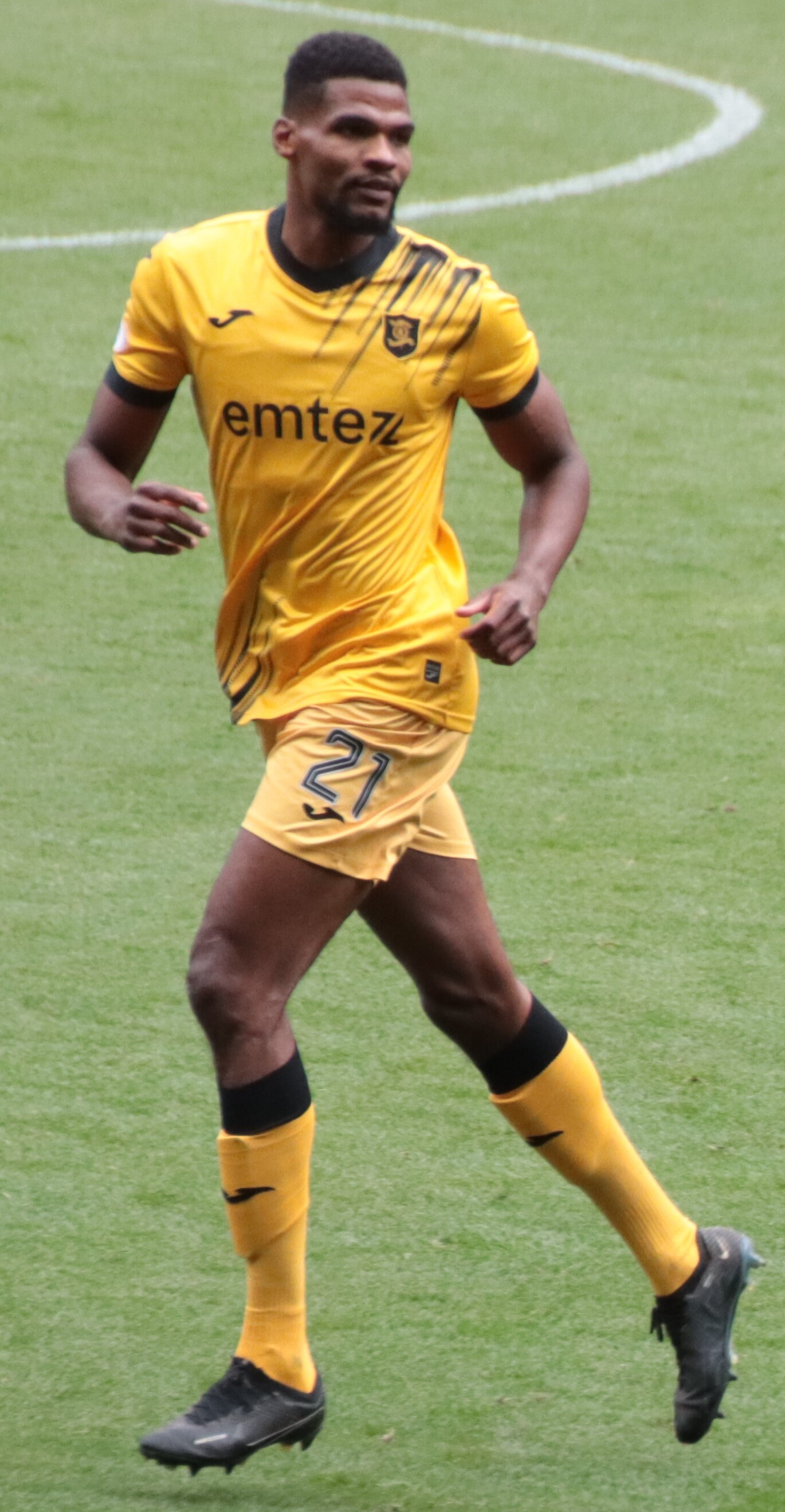
- Nottingham playing for Livingston in 2023

Personal information
- Full name: Michael Jermain Nottingham
- Date of birth: 14 April 1989 (age 37)
- Place of birth: Birmingham, England
- Height: 6 ft 4 in (1.93 m)
- Position: Defender

Team information
- Current team: Radcliffe

Senior career*
| Years | Team | Apps | (Gls) |
| 2010 | Romulus | | |
| 2010–2011 | Castle Vale JKS | | |
| 2011 | Redditch United | | |
| 2011–2013 | Gresley | 66 | (8) |
| 2013–2016 | Solihull Moors | 106 | (8) |
| 2016–2018 | Salford City | 83 | (13) |
| 2018–2020 | Blackpool | 35 | (2) |
| 2020 | → Crewe Alexandra (loan) | 12 | (1) |
| 2020–2023 | Accrington Stanley | 100 | (11) |
| 2023–2025 | Livingston | 52 | (1) |
| 2025–2026 | Brackley Town | 9 | (1) |
| 2026– | Radcliffe | | |

International career^{‡}
| 2017 | Saint Kitts and Nevis | 2 | (0) |
- * Club domestic league appearances and goals as of 29 November 2025 ‡ National team caps and goals as of 21:11, 22 February 2023 (UTC)

Michael Jermain Nottingham (born 14 April 1989) is a professional footballer who plays as a defender for National League North club Radcliffe. Born in England, he has represented the Saint Kitts and Nevis national team.

== Club career ==
Nottingham started his career in the Northern Premier League Division One South with Romulus and Castle Vale JKS of the Midland Football Combination. In 2011 he also had a short spell at Southern Football League Premier Division side Redditch United. In October 2011 he signed for Midland Football Alliance side Gresley and made his debut against Causeway United. The side finished as champions in the 2011–12 season and were promoted to the Northern Premier League Division One South. In his second season with the club he was named in the Northern Premier League Division One South Team of the Year. He made a total of eighty appearances in all competitions for Gresley, scoring nine goals.

In the summer of 2013 he stepped up a couple of divisions to sign for National League North side Solihull Moors. Nottingham made thirty-nine appearances and scored six goals and was an integral part of the side in the 2015–16 season as Solihull finished as champions. He swept up a number of awards at the end of the campaign, including Supporters' Player of the Season and Players' Player of the Season. He was also named in the National League North Team of the Year for the first time. It proved to be his last season with the club after making over a hundred appearances.

In May 2016, following Solihull's promotion to the National League, he decided to join newly promoted National League North side Salford City for personal reasons as he wanted to be further north to live with his partner. He made 44 league appearances and scored ten goals and was named Supporters' Player of the Year, as well as being named in the National League North Team of the Year once again. In his second season he won the National League North for the second time as Salford were promoted to the National League as champions. He scored four goals in 42 appearances in all competitions and was also named in the Team of the Year for the third season running.

On 21 May 2018, after Nottingham's contract with Salford City had ended, he joined League One club Blackpool on a two-year deal.

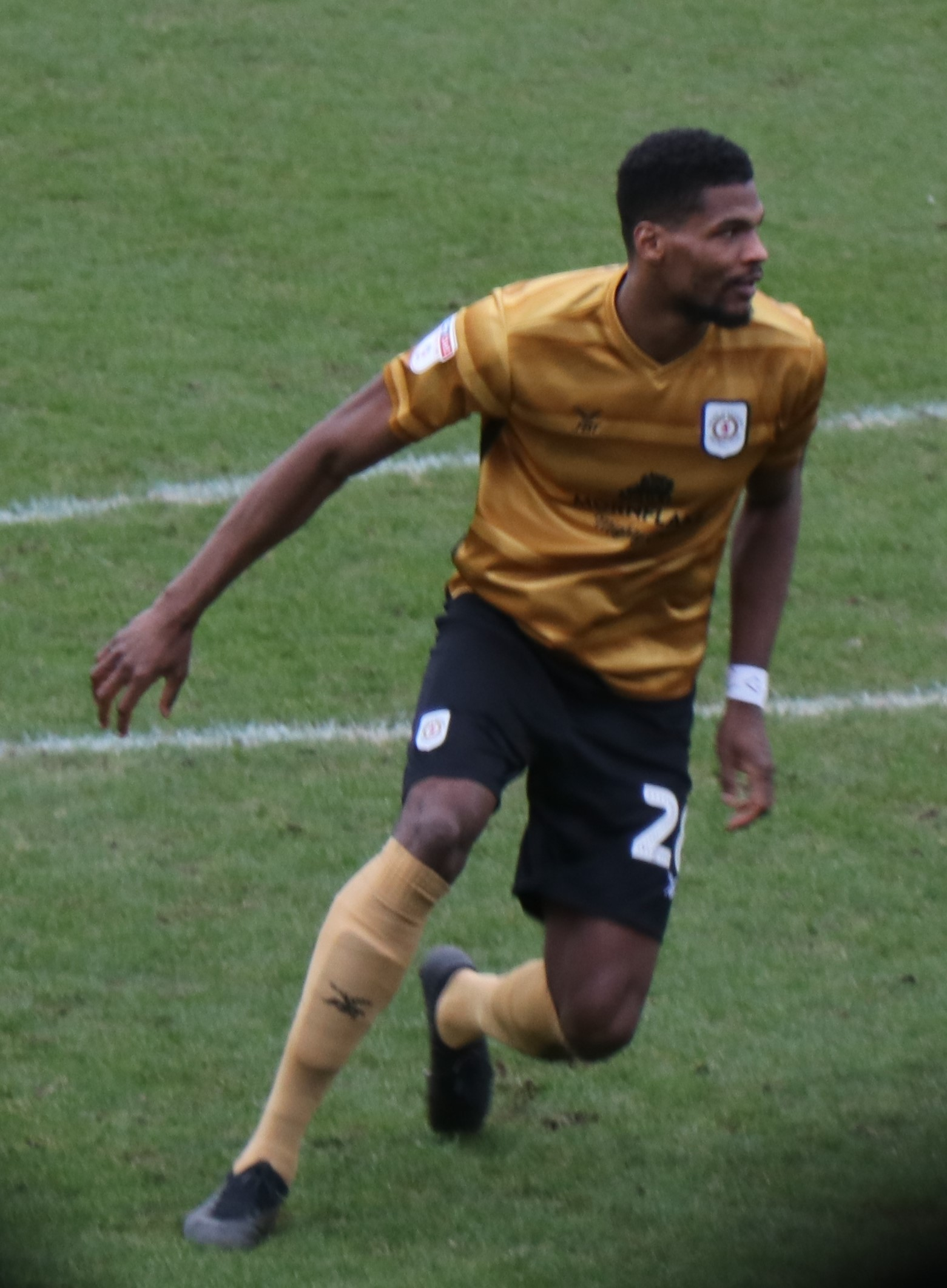
Nottingham playing for Crewe at Morecambe, February 2020.

Nottingham signed for Crewe Alexandra on a six-month loan deal on 16 January 2020, and made his Crewe debut two days later in a 1–0 win over Cheltenham Town at Gresty Road. He scored his first Crewe goal, the equaliser in a 1–1 draw at Exeter City, on 3 March 2020. Crewe manager David Artell had hoped to sign Nottingham, but Blackpool manager Neil Critchley triggered an option to automatically extend Nottingham's contract.

On 9 October 2020, Nottingham joined Accrington Stanley in a three-year deal. During the 2021–22 season, Nottingham started every league game for Stanley, scoring six goals, and was duly named Player of the Year by the club's supporters. However, the following season he missed the majority of the campaign with an ankle tendon injury sustained in pre-season. On 16 July 2023, it was announced Nottingham had left the club.

Nottingham signed for Livingston in July 2023 on a one-year deal. In June 2025, he announced he would leave the club at the end of his contact.

On 12 July 2025, Nottingham joined newly promoted National League side Brackley Town. Nottingham was a standout player for Brackley during the 2025-26 season, featuring both centrally and on the right-hand side of defence. He notably scored a winning header for the Saints on Boxing Day against Forest Green, which ending up being a crucial result that saw them embark on an eight game unbeaten stretch. He was awarded Supporter's Player of the Season.

On 17 June 2026, he joined National League North side Radcliffe on a one-year deal.

== International career ==
Born in Birmingham, West Midlands, Nottingham qualified for Saint Kitts and Nevis through his heritage. He received his first call-up to the national side in June 2017 for two friendlies in Europe against Armenia and Georgia. He made his debut on 4 June in Yerevan playing the first 68 minutes before he was substituted off in their 5–0 defeat to Armenia. Three days later he came on as a late substitute in the 3–0 defeat to Georgia in Tbilisi.

== Personal life ==
Nottingham grew up in the Birmingham suburb of Aston, near to Aston Villa. He attended Manor Park Primary School. Whilst playing as a semi-professional for Solihull Moors, he also worked as a vehicle marshall for Balfour Beatty.

== Career statistics ==
=== Club ===
As of 8 December 2025

Appearances and goals by club, season and competition
| Club | Season | League | | | National cup (Note: Includes FA Cup, Scottish Cup) | | League cup (Note: Includes EFL Cup, Scottish League Cup) | | Other | | Total | |
| Club | Season | Division | Apps | Goals | Apps | Goals | Apps | Goals | Apps | Goals | Apps | Goals |
|---|---|---|---|---|---|---|---|---|---|---|---|---|
| Gresley | 2011–12 | Midland Football Alliance | 30 | 6 | — | | — | | 7 (Note: Five appearances in FA Vase, two appearances in Derbyshire Senior Cup) | 0 | 37 | 6 |
| Gresley | 2012–13 | Northern Premier League Division One South | 36 | 2 | 4 | 1 | — | | 3 (Note: Two appearances in FA Trophy, one appearance in Derbyshire Senior Cup) | 0 | 43 | 3 |
| Gresley | Total | | 66 | 8 | 4 | 1 | — | | 10 | 0 | 80 | 9 |
| Solihull Moors | 2013–14 | Conference North | 26 | 0 | 3 | 0 | — | | 0 | 0 | 29 | 0 |
| Solihull Moors | 2014–15 | Conference North | 41 | 2 | 1 | 0 | — | | 2 (Note: Appearances in FA Trophy) | 0 | 44 | 2 |
| Solihull Moors | 2015–16 | National League North | 39 | 6 | 2 | 0 | — | | 1 | 0 | 42 | 6 |
| Solihull Moors | Total | | 106 | 8 | 6 | 0 | — | | 3 | 0 | 115 | 8 |
| Salford City | 2016–17 | National League North | 42 | 9 | 2 | 0 | — | | 5 (Note: Two appearances one goal in FA Trophy, one appearance in Manchester Premier Cup, two appearances one goal in National League North play-offs) | 2 | 49 | 11 |
| Salford City | 2017–18 | National League North | 41 | 4 | 1 | 0 | — | | 2 (Note: Appearances in Manchester Premier Cup) | 0 | 44 | 4 |
| Salford City | Total | | 83 | 13 | 3 | 0 | — | | 7 | 2 | 93 | 15 |
| Blackpool | 2018–19 | League One | 29 | 2 | 3 | 0 | 4 | 2 | 3 (Note: Appearances in EFL Trophy) | 0 | 39 | 4 |
| Blackpool | 2019–20 | League One | 3 | 0 | 0 | 0 | 1 | 0 | 2 | 1 | 6 | 1 |
| Blackpool | 2020–21 | League One | 3 | 0 | 0 | 0 | 1 | 0 | 1 | 0 | 5 | 0 |
| Blackpool | Total | | 35 | 2 | 3 | 0 | 6 | 2 | 6 | 1 | 50 | 5 |
| Crewe Alexandra (loan) | 2019–20 | League Two | 12 | 1 | 0 | 0 | 0 | 0 | 0 | 0 | 12 | 1 |
| Accrington Stanley | 2020–21 | League One | 42 | 4 | 1 | 0 | 0 | 0 | 0 | 0 | 43 | 4 |
| Accrington Stanley | 2021–22 | League One | 46 | 6 | 1 | 0 | 1 | 0 | 4 | 2 | 52 | 8 |
| Accrington Stanley | 2022–23 | League One | 12 | 1 | 1 | 0 | 0 | 0 | 0 | 0 | 13 | 1 |
| Accrington Stanley | Total | | 100 | 11 | 3 | 0 | 1 | 0 | 4 | 2 | 108 | 13 |
| Livingston | 2023–24 | Scottish Premiership | 26 | 0 | 3 | 0 | 1 | 0 | — | | 30 | 0 |
| Livingston | 2024–25 | Scottish Championship | 26 | 1 | 1 | 0 | 4 | 0 | 5 (Note: Four appearances in Scottish League Challenge Cup, one appearance in Scottish Championship play-offs) | 0 | 36 | 1 |
| Livingston | Total | | 52 | 1 | 4 | 0 | 5 | 0 | 5 | 0 | 66 | 1 |
| Brackley Town | 2025–26 | National League | 9 | 1 | 2 | 1 | 0 | 0 | — | | 11 | 2 |
| Career total | | | 463 | 45 | 25 | 2 | 12 | 2 | 35 | 5 | 535 | 54 |

=== International ===
As of match played 7 June 2017

Appearances and goals by national team and year
| National team | Year | Apps | Goals |
|---|---|---|---|
| Saint Kitts and Nevis | 2017 | 2 | 0 |
| Total | | 2 | 0 |

== Honours ==
Gresley

- Midland Football Alliance: 2011–12

Solihull Moors

- National League North: 2015–16

Salford City

- National League North: 2017–18

Crewe Alexandra

- EFL League Two second-place promotion: 2019–20

Livingston

- Scottish Challenge Cup: 2024–25
- Scottish Premiership play-offs: 2025

Individual

- Northern Premier League Division One South Team of the Year: 2012–13
- National League North Team of the Year: 2015–16, 2016–17, 2017–18
- Solihull Moors Player of the Year: 2015–16
- Salford City Player of the Year: 2016–17
- Accrington Stanley Player of the Year: 2021–22
