= Daniel Finlayson =

Northern Irish footballer

Personal information
- Date of birth: 19 January 2001 (age 25)
- Position: Defender

Team information
- Current team: St Johnstone

Youth career
- Rangers

Senior career*
Years	Team	Apps	(Gls)
2020–2021	Rangers	0	(0)
2020	→ Orange County (loan)	12	(0)
2020–2021	→ St Mirren (loan)	3	(0)
2021–2023	St Mirren	0	(0)
2021–2022	→ Kelty Hearts (loan)	23	(1)
2022–2023	→ Linfield (loan)	34	(1)
2023–2024	Linfield	33	(4)
2024–2026	Livingston	69	(0)
2026-	St Johnstone	0	(0)

International career^{‡}
2018–2019	Northern Ireland U19	9	(0)
2019–	Northern Ireland U21	1	(0)
- * Club domestic league appearances and goals as of 20 May 2026 ‡ National team caps and goals as of 16 July 2020

Daniel Finlayson (born 19 January 2001) is a professional footballer who last played for Scottish Premiership side St Johnstone.

== Career ==
=== Rangers ===
Finlayson came through the youth system at Rangers. In February 2020 he moved on loan to USL Championship club Orange County alongside Cammy Palmer and Matthew Shiels, as part of a partnership between Rangers and Orange County. He made his league debut for the club on 16 July 2020 against Phoenix Rising.

=== St Mirren ===
On 5 October 2020, Finlayson returned to Scotland to join St Mirren on a season-long loan deal with an option to buy for an undisclosed fee. St Mirren announced on 21 May 2021 that they had exercised this option and had signed Finlayson to a two-year contract. He was loaned to Kelty Hearts in October 2021.

=== Linfield ===
In June 2022, Finlayson moved on loan to Linfield until the end of the 2022–23 season. It was agreed in April 2023 that the move would be made on a permanent basis.

=== Livingston ===
Finlayson departed Linfield at the end of his contract, and on 13 May 2024, it was announced that Finlayson had signed for Scottish Championship side Livingston, linking up with former Linfield team-mate Matthew Clarke. During his first season with the Lions, the club successfully won promotion to the Scottish Premiership through the play-offs. Finlayson played in 38 of 40 possible games in the league, with 22 starts and 16 substitute appearances, featuring in all four play-off fixtures. Livingston also won the Challenge Cup, with Finlayson appearing from the bench during a 5-0 win in the final against Queen's Park. During the 2025-26 season Finlayson became a more regular starter and played 90 minutes in 33 of Livingston's matches.

After Livingston were relegated from the Premiership in the 2025-26 season, Finlayson left the club following the expiration of his contract and joined St Johnstone.

=== St Johnstone ===
Finlayson signed a two-year contract with St Johnstone on 20 May 2026.

== Career statistics ==
=== Club ===
As of match played 31 May 2026

Appearances and goals by club, season and competition
Club	Season	League			National cup (Note: Includes Scottish Cup, Irish Cup)		League cup (Note: Includes Scottish League Cup, NIFL Cup)		Continental		Other		Total	
Club	Season	Division	Apps	Goals	Apps	Goals	Apps	Goals	Apps	Goals	Apps	Goals	Apps	Goals
Rangers B	2018-19	—			—		—		—		0	0	0	0
Rangers B	2019-20	—			—		—		—		5 (Note: Appearance(s) in Scottish Challenge Cup)	0	5	0
Rangers B	Total		—		—		—		—		5	0	5	0
Rangers	2020-21	Scottish Premiership	0	0	0	0	0	0	—		0	0	0	0
Orange County (loan)	2020	USL Championship	12	0	—		—		—		—		12	0
St Mirren (loan)	2020-21	Scottish Premiership	3	0	0	0	0	0	—		—		3	0
St Mirren	2021-22	Scottish Premiership	0	0	0	0	1	0	—		—		1	0
St Mirren	2022-23	Scottish Premiership	0	0	0	0	0	0	—		—		0	0
St Mirren	Total		0	0	0	0	1	0	—		—		1	0
St Mirren B	2021-22	—			—		—		—		1	0	1	0
Kelty Hearts (loan)	2021-22	Scottish League Two	23	1	4	0	0	0	—		0	0	27	1
Linfield (loan)	2022-23	NIFL Premiership	34	1	1	0	4	0	8 (Note: Four appearances in UEFA Champions League, Two appearances in UEFA Europa League, Two appearances in UEFA Europa Conference League)	0	2	0	49	1
Linfield	2023-24	NIFL Premiership	33	3	5	0	3	0	3 (Note: Appearance(s) in UEFA Europa Conference League)	1	—		48	4
Livingston	2024-25	Scottish Championship	34	0	3	0	2	0	—		9 (Note: Five appearances in the Scottish Challenge Cup, four appearances in the Scottish Premiership play-offs)	0	48	0
Livingston	2025-26	Scottish Premiership	35	0	1	0	5	0	—		—		41	0
Livingston	Total		69	0	4	0	7	0	—		9	0	89	0
St Johnstone	2026-27	Scottish Premiership	0	0	0	0	0	0	—		0	0	0	0
Career total			139	5	13	0	10	0	11	1	17	0	190	6

== Honours ==
Livingston

- Scottish Challenge Cup: 2024–25
- Scottish Premiership play-offs: 2025
