= Reece McAlear =

Scottish footballer

Personal information
- Full name: Reece McAlear
- Date of birth: 12 February 2002 (age 24)
- Place of birth: Glasgow, Scotland
- Position: Midfielder

Team information
- Current team: St Johnstone
- Number: 42

Youth career
- –2019: Motherwell
- 2019–2020: Norwich City

Senior career*
Years	Team	Apps	(Gls)
2020–2022	Norwich City	1	(0)
2021–2022	→ Inverness Caledonian Thistle (loan)	28	(4)
2022–2024	Tranmere Rovers	37	(0)
2023	→ Ayr United (loan)	14	(0)
2024–2025	Livingston	24	(2)
2025–	St Johnstone	35	(5)

International career
2017	Scotland U16	6	(0)
2018–2019	Scotland U17	5	(1)
2019	Scotland U18	1	(0)
- * Club domestic league appearances and goals as of 4 May 2026

Reece McAlear (born 12 February 2002) is a Scottish professional footballer who plays as a midfielder for Scottish Premiership club St Johnstone.

== Career ==
He joined Norwich City from Motherwell for an undisclosed fee in summer 2019.

He made his debut on 28 November 2020 as a substitute in a league match against Coventry City.

On 17 June 2021, McAlear joined Scottish Championship side Inverness Caledonian Thistle on a season-long loan deal.

On 21 May 2022, it was announced that McAlear would be released by Norwich City at the end of the season when his contract expired.

On 9 June 2022, it was announced that McAlear had signed for Tranmere Rovers on a two-year contract. On 31 January 2023, McAlear joined Scottish Championship club Ayr United on loan until the end of the season. He was released by Tranmere at the end of the 2023–24 season.

In May 2024, McAlear signed a pre-contract with Scottish Championship club Livingston on an initial one-year deal, with an automatic one-year extension triggered by promotion.

In July 2025, McAlear signed for St Johnstone for an undisclosed amount.

== International career ==
McAlear has represented Scotland at youth international level.

== Career statistics ==
As of match played 30 January 2026

Appearances and goals by club, season and competition
Club	Season	League			National cup (Note: Includes Scottish Cup, FA Cup)		League cup (Note: Includes Scottish League Cup, EFL Cup)		Other		Total	
Club	Season	Division	Apps	Goals	Apps	Goals	Apps	Goals	Apps	Goals	Apps	Goals
Norwich City U21	2019–20	—			—		—		2 (Note: Appearance(s) in EFL Trophy)	0	2	0
Norwich City U21	2020–21	—			—		—		4	0	4	0
Norwich City U21	Total		—		—		—		6	0	6	0
Norwich City	2020–21	Championship	1	0	0	0	0	0	—		1	0
Norwich City	2021–22	Premier League	0	0	0	0	0	0	—		0	0
Norwich City	Total		1	0	0	0	0	0	—		1	0
Inverness Caledonian Thistle (loan)	2021–22	Scottish Championship	28	4	2	0	4	0	9 (Note: Three appearances in Scottish Challenge Cup, six appearances and two goals in Scottish Premiership play-offs)	2	43	6
Tranmere Rovers	2022–23	League Two	13	0	1	0	2	0	3	0	19	0
Tranmere Rovers	2023–24	League Two	24	0	0	0	2	0	3	0	29	0
Tranmere Rovers	Total		37	0	1	0	4	0	6	0	48	0
Ayr United (loan)	2022−23	Scottish Championship	14	0	2	0	—		1 (Note: Appearance(s) in Scottish Premiership play-offs)	0	17	0
Livingston	2024−25	Scottish Championship	24	2	4	1	4	0	5 (Note: Four appearances and one goal in Scottish Challenge Cup, one appearance in Scottish Premiership play-offs)	1	37	4
St Johnstone	2025–26	Scottish Championship	23	1	1	0	4	0	1 (Note: Appearance(s) in Scottish Challenge Cup)	0	29	1
Career total			127	7	10	1	16	0	28	3	181	11

== Honours ==
Livingston

- Scottish Challenge Cup: 2024–25
- Scottish Premiership play-offs: 2025

St Johnstone

- Scottish Championship: 2025–26
