= Matthew Clarke (footballer, born 1994) =

Northern Irish footballer

Personal information
- Date of birth: 3 March 1994 (age 32)
- Place of birth: Northern Ireland
- Position: Defender

Team information
- Current team: Ballymena United
- Number: 16

Youth career
- –2010: Linfield
- 2010–2013: Rangers

Senior career*
Years	Team	Apps	(Gls)
2013–2024	Linfield	422	(11)
2024–2025	Livingston	28	(2)
2025–	Ballymena United	37	(3)
- * Club domestic league appearances and goals as of 29 April 2026

Matthew Clarke (born 3 March 1994) is a Northern Irish professional footballer who plays as a defender for Ballymena United.

== Club career ==
Clarke began his career in the youth academy of Linfield. He signed as a youth player for Rangers in 2010. The defender rejoined Linfield in 2013, signing a professional contract.

He had a testimonial game in 2023 against Rangers Legends, which included Charlie Miller and Alex Rae.

In May 2024, he signed a pre-contract agreement with Scottish side Livingston.

Clarke left Livi at the end of the 2024-25 season and returned to Northern Ireland to sign for Ballymena United.

== Honours ==
Livingston

- Scottish Challenge Cup: 2024–25
