= 2021–22 Greenock Morton F.C. season =

Greenock Morton
2021–22 season
- Owner: Golden Casket Group
- Chairman: Crawford Rae
- Manager: Gus MacPherson (until 4 December); Dougie Imrie (from 21 December)
- Stadium: Cappielow
- Scottish Championship: 7th
- Scottish Cup: Fourth Round
- Scottish League Cup: Group Stage
- Scottish Challenge Cup: Quarter-final
- Top goalscorer: League: Gozie Ugwu (8); All: Robbie Muirhead (9)
- Highest home attendance: 2,878 vs. Kilmarnock, Championship, 13 November 2021
- Lowest home attendance: 339 vs. Clyde, League Cup, 24 July 2021
- Average home league attendance: 1,603
Home colours	Away colours	Third colours

The 2021–22 season is Greenock Morton's seventh consecutive season in the Scottish Championship, following their promotion from Scottish League One in the 2014–15 season. They will also compete in the Scottish League Cup, Scottish Challenge Cup and the Scottish Cup.

== Season summary ==
In May 2021, the SPFL confirmed the return of the Scottish Challenge Cup after being scrapped for the 2020–21 season however, teams from Wales, Northern Ireland and the Republic of Ireland would not be included to reduce unnecessary travel during the COVID-19 pandemic.

=== Management ===
Morton began the season under the management of Gus MacPherson who had been appointed midway through the previous season and had overseen their survival in the Scottish Championship. On 4 December, MacPherson was sacked from his position with the club sitting eighth in the table, ahead of the relegation play-off spot on goal difference. On 21 December, former Morton winger Dougie Imrie returned to the club and was appointed as their new manager.

== Competitions ==
=== Scottish Championship ===
Win	Draw	Loss

Date	Opponent	Venue	Result (Note: Greenock Morton's score written first)	Scorers	Attendance	Ref.
31 July 2021	Dunfermline Athletic	Home	2–2	Oliver 23' pen., McGrattan 81'	821	
7 August 2021	Hamilton Academical	Away	1–0	Ugwu 40'	935	
21 August 2021	Queen of the South	Home	2–3	Jacobs 31', Brynn 83' o.g.	1,429	
28 August 2021	Partick Thistle	Away	0–3		3,034	
11 September 2021	Kilmarnock	Away	0–1		4,189	
18 September 2021	Raith Rovers	Home	0–1		1,420	
25 September 2021	Ayr United	Away	0–0		1,638	
2 October 2021	Arbroath	Home	2–2	Oliver 47', Blues 55'	1,126	
16 October 2021	Inverness Caledonian Thistle	Away	0–2		1,900	
23 October 2021	Queen of the South	Away	0–0		1,093	
26 October 2021	Partick Thistle	Home	0–0		1,867	
30 October 2021	Hamilton Academical	Home	1–1	Ugwu 90+7'	1,529	
6 November 2021	Dunfermline Athletic	Away	3–1	Oliver 13', 87', Ugwu 60'	3,531	
13 November 2021	Kilmarnock	Home	0–2		2,878	
20 November 2021	Raith Rovers	Away	1–2	Ledger 5'	1,640	
4 December 2021	Ayr United	Home	2–2	Ugwu 26', 84'	1,335	
11 December 2021	Inverness Caledonian Thistle	Home	1–6	Ugwu 45+1' pen.	1,192	
18 December 2021	Arbroath	Away	1–2	Oliver 74'	1,220	
29 December 2021	Kilmarnock	Away	1–1	Lithgow 68'	500	
8 January 2022	Dunfermline Athletic	Home	5–0	Oliver 35', Blues 40', Reilly 45+1', Donaldson 72' o.g., Muirhead 79'	429	
15 January 2022	Ayr United	Away	2–0	Reilly 27', 61'	500	
28 January 2022	Raith Rovers	Home	2–2	Ugwu 25', Muirhead 75'	1,404	
5 February 2022	Inverness Caledonian Thistle	Away	1–0	Strapp 24'	1,808	
12 February 2022	Queen of the South	Home	2–1	Reilly 80', Blues 81'	1,445	
19 February 2022	Hamilton Academical	Away	1–0		1,360	
22 February 2022	Partick Thistle	Away	1–0	McEntee 80'	2,345	
26 February 2022	Arbroath	Home	0–0		1,696	
5 March 2022	Queen of the South	Away	0–3		1,217	
12 March 2022	Partick Thistle	Home	2–1	Reilly 76', Muirhead 86'	2,294	
18 March 2022	Dunfermline Athletic	Away	1–1	Wilson 42'	4,593	
26 March 2022	Ayr United	Home	1–1	Blues 38'	1,815	
1 April 2022	Kilmarnock	Home	1–1	Ugwu 59'	2,650	
9 April 2022	Raith Rovers	Away	1–0	Muirhead 65'	1,660	
16 April 2022	Hamilton Academical	Home	0–1		1,808	
23 April 2022	Inverness Caledonian Thistle	Home	0–1		1,717	
29 April 2022	Arbroath	Away	0–3		3,121	

=== Scottish League Cup ===
==== Group stage ====
Win	Draw	Loss

Date	Opponent	Venue	Result	Scorers	Attendance	Ref.
10 July 2021	Stranraer	Away	0–3			
13 July 2021	East Kilbride	Home	0–0 (5–4 Pen.)		0	
20 July 2021	Kilmarnock	Away	1–1 (3–4 Pen.)	McGregor 16'	2,000	
24 July 2021	Clyde	Home	2–1	Muirhead 63', 68'	339	

Notes

1. A: Stranraer were awarded a 3–0 win over Morton due to a coronavirus outbreak amongst the Morton squad.

=== Scottish Challenge Cup ===
Round	Date	Opponent	Venue	Result	Scorers	Attendance	Ref.
Second Round	4 September 2021	Celtic B	Away	3–1	Garrity 16', Muirhead 26', Blues 66'	482	
Third Round	9 October 2021	Montrose	Away	0–0 (4–2 pen.)		476	
Quarter-final	1 December 2021	Queen of the South	Away	1–2	Lithgow 86'	525	

=== Scottish Cup ===
Round	Date	Opponent	Venue	Result	Scorers	Attendance	Ref.
Third Round	7 December 2021	Inverness Caledonian Thistle	Away	1–1 (5–4 pen.)	Muirhead 42'	700	
Fourth Round	22 January 2022	Motherwell	Away	1–2 (aet.)	Muirhead 105'	4,735	

=== Team statistics ===
==== League table ====
Pos	Team	Pld	W	D	L	GF	GA	GD	Pts	Promotion, qualification or relegation
5	Raith Rovers	36	12	14	10	44	44	0	50	
6	Hamilton Academical	36	10	12	14	38	53	−15	42	
7	Greenock Morton	36	9	13	14	36	47	−11	40	
8	Ayr United	36	9	12	15	39	52	−13	39	
9	Dunfermline Athletic (R)	36	7	14	15	36	53	−17	35	Qualification for the Championship play-offs

Rules for classification: 1) Points; 2) Goal difference; 3) Goals scored; 4) Head-to-to head points; 5) Head-to-head goal difference; 6) Play-off (only for deciding promotion, play-off participation and relegation).
(R) Relegated

==== League Cup table ====
Pos	Team	Pld	W	PW	PL	L	GF	GA	GD	Pts	Qualification	KIL	STR	GMO	EKI	CLY
1	Kilmarnock	4	2	1	0	1	5	6	−1	8	Qualification for the second round	—	2–1	p1–1	—	—
2	Stranraer	4	2	0	0	2	5	3	+2	6		—	—	3–0 (Note: Stranraer were awarded a technical 3−0 win over Greenock Morton, who were unable to raise a team after a COVID-19 outbreak among players and staff.)	1–0	—
3	Greenock Morton	4	1	1	1	1	3	5	−2	6		—	—	—	p0–0	2–1
4	East Kilbride	4	1	0	2	1	5	3	+2	5		3–0 (Note: East Kilbride were awarded a technical 3−0 win over Kilmarnock, who fielded an ineligible player. The match had originally finished 2–0 to Kilmarnock.)	—	—	—	2–2p
5	Clyde	4	1	1	0	2	5	6	−1	5		1–2	1–0	—	—	—

Rules for classification: 1) goal difference, 2) goals scored, 3) away goals scored, 4) matches won, 5) away matches won, 6) drawing of lots.
