= Lewis Smith (footballer) =

Scottish footballer (born 2000)

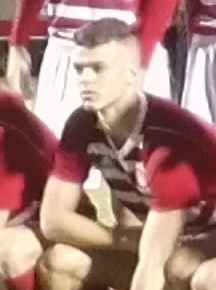
- Smith with Hamilton U19s, 2018

Personal information
- Date of birth: 16 March 2000 (age 26)
- Position: Winger

Team information
- Current team: Aberdeen
- Number: 11

Youth career
- 2009–2018: Hamilton Academical

Senior career*
| Years | Team | Apps | (Gls) |
| 2018–2024 | Hamilton Academical | 120 | (12) |
| 2024–2026 | Livingston | 61 | (10) |
| 2026– | Aberdeen | 11 | (0) |

International career^{‡}
| 2017 | Scotland U17 | 3 | (0) |
| 2019– | Scotland U21 | 1 | (0) |
- * Club domestic league appearances and goals as of 08:48, 22 November 2026 (UTC) ‡ National team caps and goals as of 08:32, 6 September 2019 (UTC)

Lewis Smith (born 16 March 2000) is a Scottish professional footballer who plays as a winger for Aberdeen.

== Club career ==
=== Hamilton Academical ===
Smith attended St Ninian's High School, Giffnock and was involved with the youth system at Hamilton Academical, the club his family supported, from the age of 9.

After signing a professional contract in summer 2016, he appeared for the club's age-restricted teams in three editions of the Scottish Challenge Cup and in the 2018–19 UEFA Youth League, before making his debut for the Accies senior team on 31 October 2018, appearing from the bench for the last ten minutes of a 3–0 away defeat to Aberdeen in the 2018–19 Scottish Premiership.

Smith made his first league start for the club on 10 August 2019 against Kilmarnock at New Douglas Park; he scored the opening goal and created the second in a 2–0 victory, receiving praise for his performance. In November 2019 he signed a new contract with Hamilton, running until summer 2022.

A hamstring injury disrupted his season in 2020–21 as Hamilton were relegated from the Premiership. He signed a further contract extension, until summer 2024, in November 2021. The club were relegated from the Scottish Championship in 2023, but Smith had an important role as they returned via the promotion play-offs a year later, scoring in wins over Alloa Athletic and Inverness Caledonian Thistle.

=== Livingston ===
In May 2024, Smith signed a pre-contract with Livingston, effective from 1 June, on a two-year deal.

=== Aberdeen ===
In July 2026 he transferred to Aberdeen.

== International career ==
Smith has represented Scotland at under-17 youth level; he sat four of his Higher school exams while on international duty at the 2017 UEFA European Under-17 Championship in Croatia. In August 2019 he was called-up by the under-21 squad, making his debut in September 2019.

== Career statistics ==
As of match played 21 November 2026

Appearances and goals by club, season and competition
| Club | Season | League | | | Scottish Cup | | Scottish League Cup | | Other | | Total | |
| Club | Season | Division | Apps | Goals | Apps | Goals | Apps | Goals | Apps | Goals | Apps | Goals |
|---|---|---|---|---|---|---|---|---|---|---|---|---|
| Hamilton Academical U20 | 2016–17 | — | | | — | | — | | 2 (Note: Appearances in Scottish Challenge Cup) | 0 | 2 | 0 |
| Hamilton Academical U20 | 2017–18 | — | | | — | | — | | 2 | 0 | 2 | 0 |
| Hamilton Academical U20 | 2018–19 | — | | | — | | — | | 2 | 1 | 2 | 1 |
| Hamilton Academical U20 | Total | | — | | — | | — | | 6 | 1 | 6 | 1 |
| Hamilton Academical | 2018–19 | Scottish Premiership | 4 | 0 | 0 | 0 | 0 | 0 | — | | 4 | 0 |
| Hamilton Academical | 2019–20 | Scottish Premiership | 23 | 3 | 1 | 1 | 4 | 1 | — | | 28 | 5 |
| Hamilton Academical | 2020–21 | Scottish Premiership | 9 | 0 | 0 | 0 | 1 | 0 | — | | 10 | 0 |
| Hamilton Academical | 2021–22 | Scottish Championship | 28 | 4 | 1 | 0 | 4 | 0 | 3 | 0 | 36 | 4 |
| Hamilton Academical | 2022–23 | Scottish Championship | 30 | 0 | 3 | 0 | 4 | 1 | 7 (Note: Four appearances in Scottish Challenge Cup; three appearances in Scottish Championship play-offs) | 0 | 44 | 1 |
| Hamilton Academical | 2023–24 | Scottish League One | 26 | 5 | 1 | 0 | 3 | 0 | 5 (Note: One appearance, one goal in Scottish Challenge Cup; four appearances, two goals in Scottish Championship play-offs) | 3 | 35 | 8 |
| Hamilton Academical | Total | | 120 | 12 | 6 | 1 | 16 | 2 | 15 | 3 | 157 | 18 |
| Livingston | 2024–25 | Scottish Championship | 26 | 3 | 2 | 0 | 4 | 0 | 9 (Note: Five appearances, one goal in Scottish Challenge Cup; four appearances, one goal in Scottish Premiership play-offs) | 2 | 41 | 5 |
| Livingston | 2025–26 | Scottish Premiership | 35 | 7 | 1 | 0 | 4 | 0 | — | | 40 | 7 |
| Livingston | Total | | 61 | 10 | 3 | 0 | 8 | 0 | 9 | 2 | 81 | 12 |
| Aberdeen | 2026–27 | Scottish Premiership | 11 | 0 | 0 | 0 | 6 | 1 | — | | 17 | 1 |
| Career total | | | 192 | 22 | 9 | 1 | 30 | 3 | 30 | 6 | 261 | 32 |

== Honours ==
Hamilton Academical

- Scottish Challenge Cup: 2022–23

Livingston

- Scottish Challenge Cup: 2024–25
- Scottish Premiership play-offs: 2025
