= Tete Yengi =

Australian soccer player (born 2000)

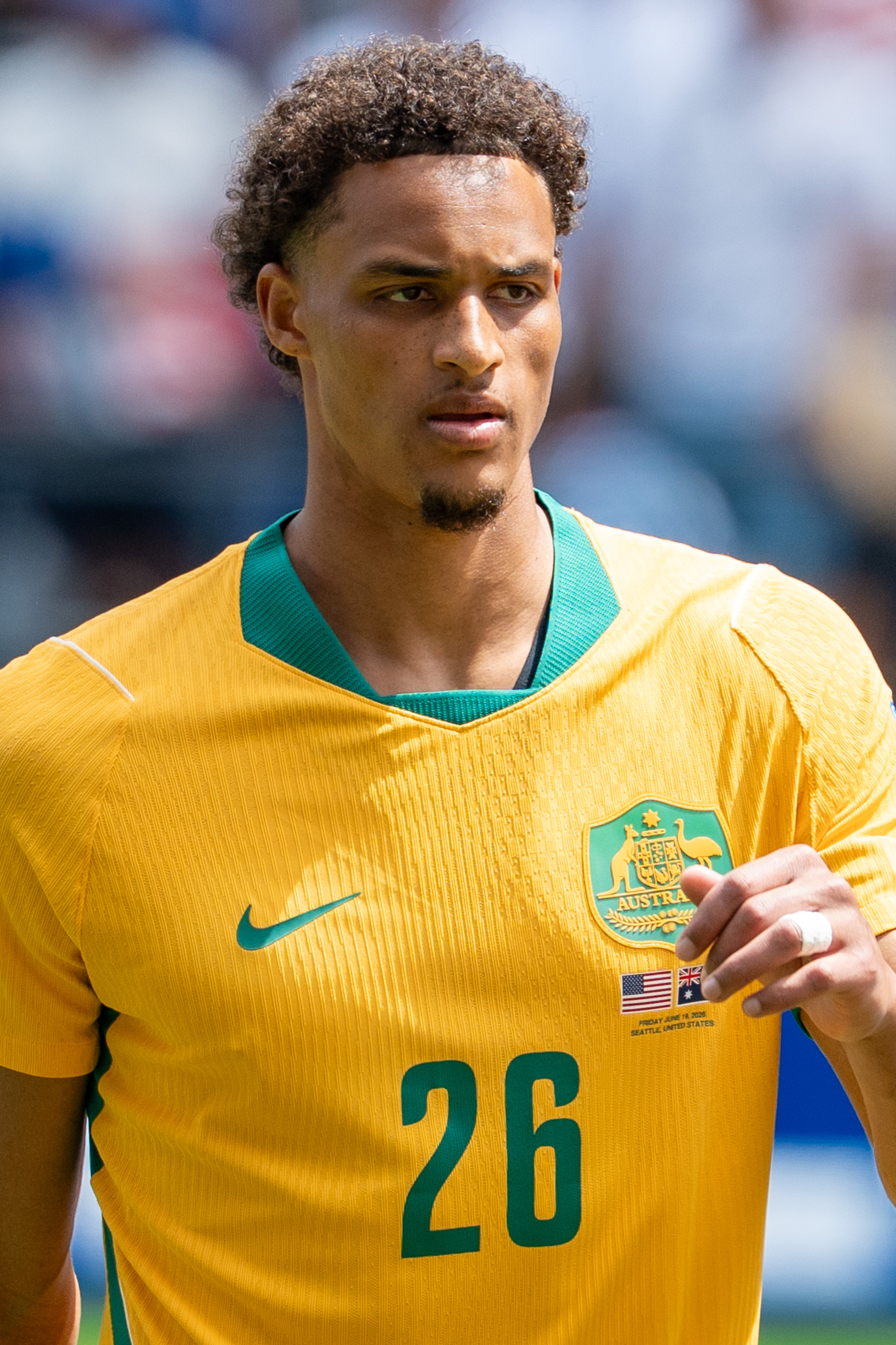
- Yengi with Australia in 2026

Personal information
- Full name: Tete Owen Yengi
- Date of birth: 28 November 2000 (age 25)
- Place of birth: Adelaide, South Australia, Australia
- Height: 1.97 m (6 ft 6 in)
- Position: Striker

Team information
- Current team: Machida Zelvia
- Number: 99

Youth career
- SA NTC
- 2015–2016: Croydon Kings
- 2017–2019: Adelaide Comets

Senior career*
Years	Team	Apps	(Gls)
2019–2020	Adelaide Comets	38	(9)
2020–2021	Newcastle Jets	9	(0)
2021	→ Newcastle Jets NPL	1	(7)
2021–2024	Ipswich Town	0	(0)
2022	→ VPS (loan)	27	(7)
2023	→ Northampton Town (loan)	16	(0)
2023	→ KuPS (loan)	11	(1)
2024–2026	Livingston	66	(11)
2026	→ Machida Zelvia (loan)	15	(3)
2026–	Machida Zelvia	11	(3)

International career^{‡}
2026–	Australia	6	(2)
- * Club domestic league appearances and goals as of 8 November 2026 ‡ National team caps and goals as of 13 November 2026

Tete Owen Yengi (born 28 November 2000) is an Australian professional soccer player who plays as a striker for J1 League club Machida Zelvia and the Australia national team. Yengi has previously played for Newcastle Jets, Ipswich Town, VPS, Northampton Town, KuPS and Livingston.

== Early life and education ==
Tete Owen Yengi was born on born 28 November 2000 in Adelaide, South Australia, of South Sudanese and English descent. His father, refugee advocate Ben Yengi, was from South Sudan, and Tete lived for some years in South Sudan as a child, as Ben was determined to help that country, and the lives of friends and family, after having received a good education and employment in Australia.

Tete and his older brother Kusini were always keen on football, and worked hard to their goal of becoming international players. As of 2026 Kusini plays as a forward in the J1 League, at Cerezo Osaka on loan from Scottish Premiership side Aberdeen.

Following the 2026 FIFA World Cup, Yengi converted to Islam.

== Club career ==
=== Newcastle Jets ===
After playing two seasons at a semi-pro level with Adelaide Comets in NPL SA, Yengi signed a scholarship deal with Australian top division side Newcastle Jets on 30 December 2020. He made a total of nine appearances in A-League during the 2020–21 season.

=== Ipswich Town and loans ===
In September 2021, Yengi moved to England and signed for League One club Ipswich Town on a one-year deal with the option for a further year, initially joining the team's Under 23 side.

==== VPS (loan) ====
In April 2022, Yengi joined Vaasan Palloseura (VPS) on loan for the 2022 season. During his time in Finland, Yengi scored seven goals and assisted a further eleven in Veikkausliiga, winning his club's Player of the Year award.

==== Northampton Town (loan) ====
On 31 January 2023, Yengi signed a new eighteen-month contract and subsequently joined League Two club Northampton Town on loan until the end of the season.

==== KuPS (loan) ====
On 16 July 2023, Yengi returned to Finland and signed a loan deal with Kuopion Palloseura (KuPS) for the remainder of the 2023 season.

=== Livingston ===
On 1 January 2024, a Scottish Premiership club Livingston announced the signing of Yengi on a two-and-a-half-year deal. Yengi made his debut the following day in a 1-2 home defeat against Hearts and scored his first Livi goal in the next league match, a penalty in a 1-4 home defeat by Dundee. He added a further three league goals, opening the scoring on each occasion, in a 1-0 home win against St Mirren, a 1-3 home defeat by Motherwell and a 5-1 loss away to Aberdeen. Despite Yengi's four goals in 16 games, at the end of the 2024-25 season, Livingston were relegated to the Scottish Championship after finishing bottom of the Premiership. In the Scottish Cup, Yengi added two memorable goals to his tally. Firstly in the fifth round, he headed home a 120th minute winner in a tie away to Partick Thistle, before equalizing to make the score 2-2 in an eventual 4-2 sixth round away defeat against Premiership champions Celtic at Celtic Park.

In the 2024-25 season Yengi competed with Stevie May and Robbie Muirhead for a place in the team, starting the fewest matches of the three, but played 42 times across all competitions and scored 10 goals. Notably he scored in the Scottish Challenge Cup final, a 5-0 win over Queen's Park, and in the second-leg of the Premiership Play-off final, a 2-4 victory against Ross County to seal promotion back to the top flight.

==== Machida Zelvia (loan) ====
On 28 January 2026, Yengi moved to J1 League side Machida Zelvia on loan until 30 June 2026, with an option to buy. On 17 April 2026, Yengi scored the only goal of the game in a 1-0 win vs Al Ittihad in the AFC Champions League Quarter-Final. In July 2026, Livingston confirmed that Yengi had transferred to Machida Zelvia on a permanent basis.

==== Machida Zelvia ====
On 8 August 2026, Yengi started for Machida Zelvia's opening match and scored in a 1-5 away victory over FC Tokyo

== International career ==
Yengi was named in the Australia's 26-man squad for the 2026 FIFA World Cup, despite never having been capped at international level. He is one of five players from Adelaide in the team.

Yengi scored the equalising goal on his international debut in a friendly against Switzerland on 6 June 2026.

== Career statistics ==
As of 18 September 2026

Appearances and goals by club, season and competition
Club	Season	League			National cup (Note: Includes Suomen Cup and Scottish Cup)		League cup (Note: Includes Finnish League Cup, Scottish League Cup)		Continental		Other		Total	
Club	Season	Division	Apps	Goals	Apps	Goals	Apps	Goals	Apps	Goals	Apps	Goals	Apps	Goals
Newcastle Jets	2020–21	A-League Men	9	0	0	0	0	0	—		—		9	0
Ipswich Town	2021–22	League One	0	0	0	0	0	0	—		0	0	0	0
VPS (loan)	2022	Veikkausliiga	27	7	3	1	0	0	—		—		30	8
Northampton Town (loan)	2022–23	League Two	16	0	0	0	0	0	—		0	0	16	0
KuPS (loan)	2023	Veikkausliiga	11	1	0	0	0	0	2 (Note: Appearance(s) in UEFA Europa Conference League)	0	—		13	1
Livingston	2023–24	Scottish Premiership	16	4	2	2	0	0	—		—		18	6
Livingston	2024–25	Scottish Championship	31	5	3	3	4	0	–		4 (Note: Appearances in Scottish Challenge Cup)	2	42	10
Livingston	2025–26	Scottish Premiership	19	2	1	0	3	0	–		—		23	2
Livingston	Total		66	11	6	5	7	0	0	0	4	2	83	18
Machida Zelvia	2026	J1 100 Year Vision League	15	3	1	1	0	0	7	3	—		23	7
Machida Zelvia	2026-27	J League	7	2	0	0	0	0	1	1	—		8	3
Machida Zelvia	Total		22	5	1	1	0	0	8	4	0	0	31	10
Career total			151	24	10	7	7	0	10	4	4	2	182	37

=== International ===
As of match played 13 November 2026

Appearances and goals by national team and year
National team	Year	Apps	Goals
Australia	2026	6	2
Total		6	2

Scores and results list Australia's goal tally first, score column indicates score after each Yengi goal.

List of international goals scored by Tete Yengi
No.	Date	Venue	Cap	Opponent	Score	Result	Competition
1	6 June 2026	Snapdragon Stadium, San Diego, United States	1	Switzerland	1–1	1–1	Friendly
2	13 November 2026	Abdullah bin Khalifa Stadium, Doha, Qatar	6	Qatar	2–0	3–0	Friendly

== Honours ==
Livingston

- Scottish Challenge Cup: 2024–25
- Scottish Premiership play-offs: 2025
