= Aphelele Teto =

South African footballer (born 2003)

Personal information
- Full name: Aphelele Teto
- Date of birth: 13 June 2003 (age 23)
- Place of birth: Scenery Park, East London, South Africa
- Height: 1.65 m (5 ft 5 in)
- Position: Midfielder

Team information
- Current team: Mamelodi Sundowns

Youth career
- TS Galaxy

Senior career*
Years	Team	Apps	(Gls)
2022–2023	TS Galaxy	18	(0)
2023–2025	Livingston	0	(0)
2024–2025	→ Chippa United (loan)	12	(0)
2025–	Mamelodi Sundowns	0	(0)
2025-	→ University of Pretoria (loan)		

International career
2025–	South Africa	1	(0)
- * Club domestic league appearances and goals as of 16 July 2026

Aphelele Teto (born 13 June 2003) is a South African professional soccer player who plays as a midfielder for University of Pretoria, on loan from Mamelodi Sundowns.

== Playing career ==
Teto started his career as a youth player at TS Galaxy. He signed a professional contract with the club in 2022 and made 12 appearances for the first team, nine of them starts, as they finished 10th in the Premier Soccer League.

He signed for Livingston in August 2023 on a four-year deal, despite him having failed to receive a work permit. Manager David Martindale clarified in September that part of the transfer agreement was that TS Galaxy would continue to pay Teto's wages until he gained a work permit to play for Livingston, and the club would attempt to loan Teto to a club in Egypt, Tunisia or South Africa. Talks took place with Supersport United but ultimately broke down and the player remained in Scotland, playing for Livingston's reserve team. Martindale stated that he expected Teto to be awarded a governing body endorsement, which would allow him to gain a UK work permit, once he was called up to the South Africa U-23 squad - this despite them having not played since March 2023 and having no scheduled fixtures after failing to qualify for the 2023 Africa U-23 Cup of Nations or 2024 Olympics.

On 31 December 2023 Livingston announced the signing of Tete Yengi and allocated him the number 17 shirt which had previously been given to Teto for the season, although this was later retracted and Yengi given the 33 shirt.

Martindale provided an update on 22 January 2024, confirming that Teto remained unable to feature for Livingston and had left the UK following the expiration of a tourist visa. It was also stated that the club was still trying to secure a loan move within Europe for the player. In July 2024, Teto signed for Chippa United on loan.

In July 2025, Teto left Livi by mutual agreement. He returned home to South Africa to sign for Mamelodi Sundowns before being loaned to University of Pretoria in August 2025. He rejoined the Tuks on loan for the 2026-27 season.

== International career ==
The midfielder was called up to the South African U-23 squad in September 2022 but did not appear for the team. He was not selected for the next squad in March 2023.

Teto made his South Africa first team debut in March 2025 against Egypt.
