= Michael Wimmer =

German football manager (born 1980)

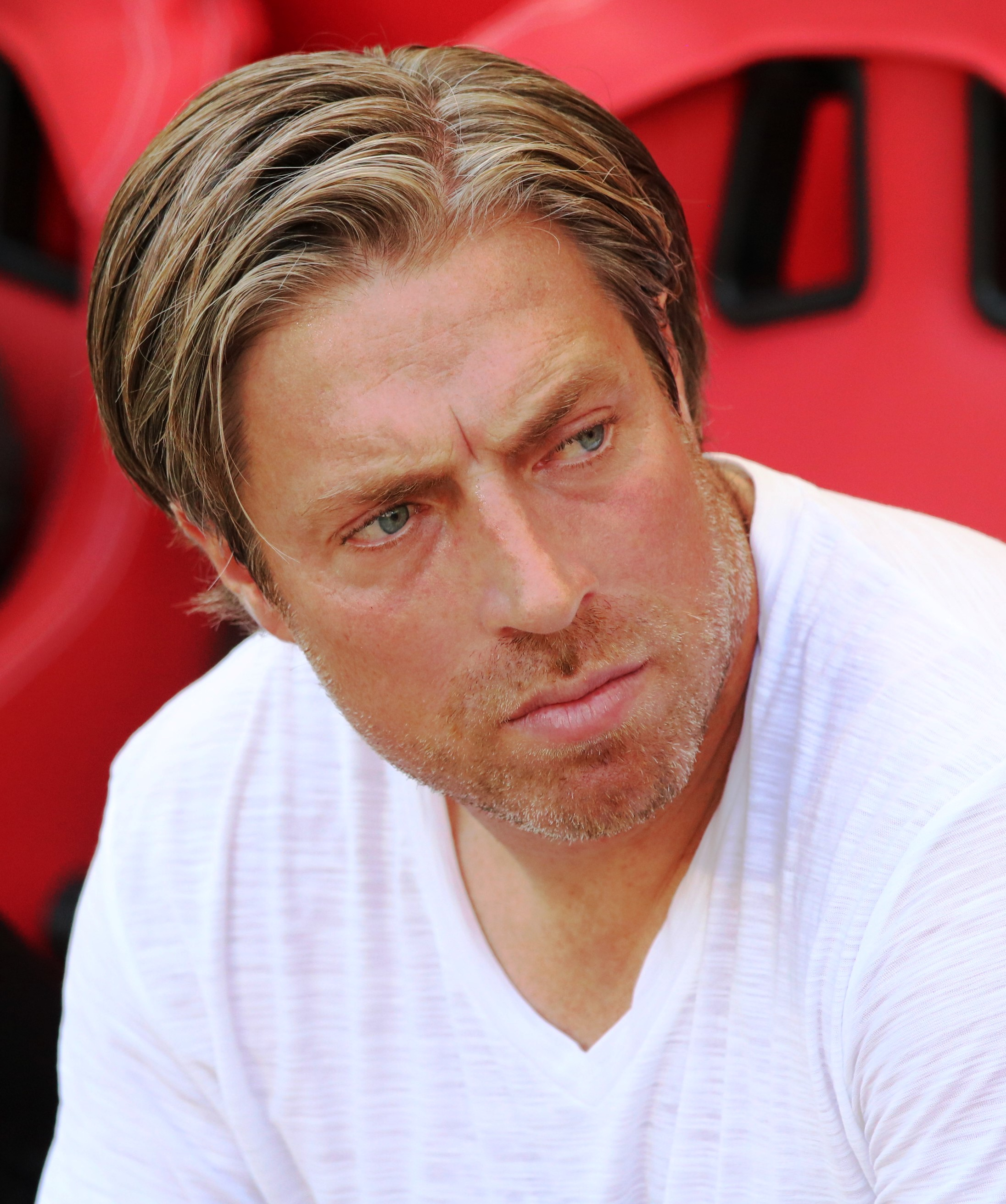
- Wimmer in 2023

Personal information
- Date of birth: 18 June 1980 (age 46)
- Place of birth: Dingolfing, West Germany
- Height: 1.84 m (6 ft 0 in)
- Position: Midfielder

Youth career
- FC Dingolfing
- SpVgg Landshut
- –1999: 1860 Munich

Senior career*
Years	Team	Apps	(Gls)
1999–2000	SV Lohhof	30	(1)
2000–2002	Greuther Fürth II		
2002–2005	FC Dingolfing		
2006	FC Ismaning	9	(0)
2006–2010	FC Dingolfing		

Managerial career
- 2022: VfB Stuttgart (interim)
- 2023–2024: Austria Wien
- 2025: Motherwell
- 2025–2026: Jahn Regensburg
- * Club domestic league appearances and goals

Michael Wimmer (born 18 June 1980) is a German football coach who last managed Jahn Regensburg.

== Career ==
=== Early career ===
In the summer of 2019 he became assistant coach of VfB Stuttgart. On 11 October 2022, Wimmer took over as head coach of VfB Stuttgart on interim basis until December 2022. Wimmer finished his interim role with a record of four wins, one draw, and three losses.

=== Austria Wien ===
He became the new head coach of Austria Wien on 3 January 2023. His first match was a 3–1 win against Austria Klagenfurt. On 21 July 2023, Austria Wien started the 2023–24 season with a 7–0 away victory over SV Spittal/Drau in the Austrian Cup. On 13 May 2024, he was dismissed following a 4–0 home defeat against Wolfsberger AC with only one matchday remaining in the season during the relegation round, in which the club was in eighth place in the overall table.

In December 2024, Wimmer was identified as the leading candidate for the vacant manager's position at English League One club Bristol Rovers, however the club were unable to secure a work permit to allow the appointment to go through.

=== Motherwell ===
On 17 February 2025, Wimmer was appointed manager of Scottish Premiership club Motherwell, replacing Stuart Kettlewell who had resigned citing abuse from the fans.. Wimmer led the club to an eighth place finish in the 2024–25 Scottish Premiership.

=== SSV Jahn Regensburg ===
Wimmer returned to Germany after Motherwell's last match of the 2024-25 season, and contacted the Motherwell chairman and CEO to inform them that he wished to remain in Germany due to "major family reasons that had recently arisen."

On 23 May 2025, Wimmer was appointed head coach of newly relegated 3. Liga club SSV Jahn Regensburg on a two-year deal. He left Regensburg in March 2026 to take up an assistant manager role at 2. Bundesliga side Holstein Kiel

== Career record ==
As of match played 7 March 2026

Team	From	To	Record					Ref.
Team	From	To	G	W	D	L	Win %	Ref.
VfB Stuttgart	10 October 2022	4 December 2022	8	4	1	3	50.00	
Austria Wien	3 January 2023	13 May 2024	61	27	16	18	44.26	
Motherwell	17 February 2025	23 May 2025	12	5	3	4	41.67	
SSV Jahn Regensburg	23 May 2025	9 March 2026	29	10	5	14	34.48	
Total			110	46	25	39	41.82	—
