= Olly Green =

English footballer (born 2003)

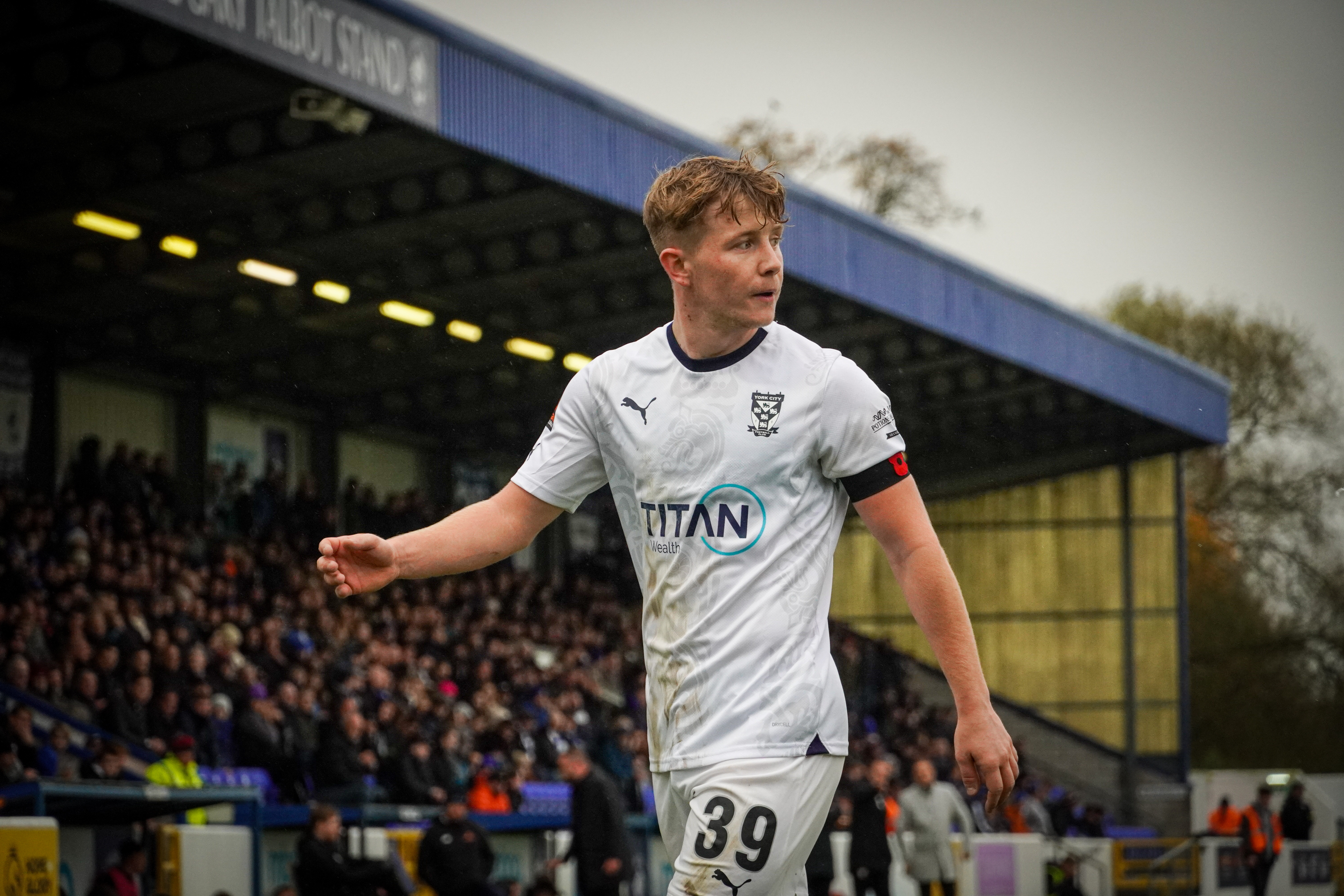
- Green in 2023

Personal information
- Full name: Oliver Jon Christopher Green
- Date of birth: 24 March 2003 (age 23)
- Place of birth: Cottingham, East Riding of Yorkshire England
- Position: Midfielder

Team information
- Current team: Spennymoor Town (on loan from Boston United)

Youth career
- –2022: Hull City

Senior career*
Years	Team	Apps	(Gls)
2022–2024	Hull City	0	(0)
2022	→ Bridlington Town (loan)	7	(0)
2022–2023	→ Marske United (loan)	4	(0)
2023	→ York City (loan)	6	(0)
2024–2025	Livingston	1	(0)
2025–	Boston United	6	(0)
2025–	→ Spennymoor Town (loan)	0	(0)
- * Club domestic league appearances and goals as of 17:48, 31 July 2025 (UTC)

Oliver Jon Christopher Green (born 24 March 2003) is an English professional footballer who plays as a midfielder for Spennymoor Town on loan from National League club Boston United.

== Club career ==
Green began his career in the youth academy of Hull City, signing his first professional contract in 2022. He had several loan spells with lower league clubs before leaving the Tigers in 2024 without having made a single first team appearance.

In June 2024, Green signed for Scottish side Livingston for an undisclosed fee.

On 4 February 2025, Green signed for National League side Boston United.

On 31 July 2025, Green joined National League North side Spennymoor Town on a season-long loan.
