= Robbie Muirhead =

Scottish footballer (born 1996)

Personal information
- Date of birth: 8 March 1996 (age 30)
- Place of birth: Irvine, Scotland
- Position: Forward

Team information
- Current team: Livingston
- Number: 9

Youth career
- –2013: Kilmarnock

Senior career*
Years	Team	Apps	(Gls)
2013–2015	Kilmarnock	42	(4)
2015–2016	Dundee United	16	(2)
2015–2016	→ Partick Thistle (loan)	8	(2)
2016–2017	Heart of Midlothian	18	(2)
2017–2018	Milton Keynes Dons	49	(5)
2018–2019	Dunfermline Athletic	12	(0)
2019–2024	Greenock Morton	125	(27)
2024–	Livingston	66	(18)

International career^{‡}
2011	Scotland U15	2	(0)
2011–2012	Scotland U16	3	(0)
2012	Scotland U17	7	(6)
2013	Scotland U18	1	(0)
2014	Scotland U19	5	(3)
- * Club domestic league appearances and goals as of 20 May 2026 ‡ National team caps and goals as of 15:15, 15 March 2018 (UTC)

Robbie Muirhead (born 8 March 1996) is a Scottish professional footballer, who plays as a forward for Scottish Championship club Livingston.

Muirhead began his career with Kilmarnock before joining Dundee United in February 2015. After a loan spell with Partick Thistle between September 2015 to January 2016, Muirhead was released by Dundee United in April 2016, before signing for Heart of Midlothian. In 2017, he moved to Milton Keynes Dons, then spent a season at Dunfermline Athletic.

He has represented Scotland at all levels up to U19 level.

== Early life ==
Born in Irvine, Scotland, Muirhead was known for playing football and golf locally, and was mentioned on several occasions in his local newspaper. Muirhead is also the first and still the only boy to win both the West of Scotland Cup and Scottish Cup when representing Annanhill Primary School during year 6 and year 7 when he was Captain of the schools team.

== Club career ==
=== Kilmarnock ===
Muirhead joined Kilmarnock academy before joining the first team. He made his professional league debut in the last game of the season, coming on as a substitute in the second half for Cillian Sheridan, in a 3–1 loss against St Mirren, which was Kenny Shiels's last game as Kilmarnock Manager.

Muirhead's playing time in the 2013–14 season soon increased with 21 appearances and scoring twice against Partick Thistle. and St Johnstone. His first team chance attracted interests from English clubs.

In the first half of the 2014–15 season, Muirhead added two more goals to his career tally, against Motherwell and St Mirren. His two goals to his tally career led Daily Record naming Muirhead as the next successor to Kris Boyd.

=== Dundee United ===
Muirhead left Kilmarnock to sign for Dundee United on the transfer deadline day for a fee of £150,000 plus add-ons, as well as signing a three-year deal. The sale of Muirhead caused the Kilmarnock manager Allan Johnston to resign in protest. Celtic was also keen to sign Muirhead, having signed Dundee United's Stuart Armstrong and Gary Mackay-Steven. Muirhead made his Dundee United debut, coming on as a substitute for Henri Anier, in a 3–2 loss against Kilmarnock. He scored his first goal for the club in a 1–0 win against Aberdeen on 2 May. He followed this up three days later with another goal, in a 2–1 defeat against Inverness Caledonian Thistle.

On 1 September 2015, Muirhead was loaned to fellow Scottish Premiership club Partick Thistle on an initial three-month deal. Muirhead scored his first and second goal, including a 30-yard strike, for Thistle in a 5–2 win on 28 November against his former club Kilmarnock. He returned to Dundee United on 4 January 2016 following the expiry of his loan period. Muirhead did not play for United after his return, and was released from his contract in April 2016.

=== Heart of Midlothian ===
Muirhead signed a one-year deal with Scottish Premiership side Heart of Midlothian in June 2016. On 30 November 2016, Muirhead scored twice in a 2–0 win over Rangers.

=== Milton Keynes Dons ===
On 19 January 2017, Muirhead signed a two-and-a-half-year deal to join English League One side Milton Keynes Dons for an undisclosed fee.

He made his debut coming on as a substitute in a 5–3 home league win over Northampton Town on 21 January 2017. On 1 April 2017, Muirhead scored his first goal for the club in a 3–2 home league win over Gillingham. On 13 March 2018, Muirhead scored twice in a 3–2 home win against Rotherham United.

=== Dunfermline Athletic ===
On 31 August 2018, Muirhead joined Scottish Championship club Dunfermline Athletic for an undisclosed fee, signing a one-year deal. He left in May 2019.

=== Greenock Morton ===
On 12 June 2019, Muirhead signed for Greenock Morton on a one-year contract. He scored his first goal for the club in a 0–5 victory against Annan Athletic in the Scottish League Cup group stages on 23 July 2019.

Muirhead would have a slow start to life at Morton, scoring very rarely for the club. He would be offered another contract by manager David Hopkin at the early end of the season brought on by the COVID-19 pandemic.

His second season in white and blue was also fairly quiet, scoring 4 goals for the season, 3 of these coming in both legs of the Championship play-off final against Airdrieonians, including a stunning 18-yard volley at Cappielow. Muirhead was promptly offered another year-long contract following this.

Muirhead started slowly again in season 2021/2022; however, his form took a slight turn for the better under manager Dougie Imrie, scoring 4 times in the second half of the season, including against Motherwell and his former club Partick Thistle. Muirhead would sign a two-year contract in the summer of 2022.

Muirhead would finally regain his form in the 2022/2023 season, scoring his first goal of the season against Ayr United in a 2–1 home defeat, however would go on to hit the 10 goal mark in a season for the first time in his career. Muirhead was also awarded Championship Player of the Month for September/October. He would go on to finish the season with a total of 13 goals, scoring on the last day of the season in a 2–1 away win over Cove Rangers, a goal which would relegate the Aberdeenshire side to league 1.

The 23/24 season would further build upon Muirhead's form at Morton. The striker would score his first of the season in a pre-season "friendly" against Morton's rivals St Mirren at Cappielow in a 2–0 victory. Muirhead's first competitive goal of the season would come in the opening game of the Championship, scoring a Penalty to take the lead against Ayr United in what would become a 3–1 victory. In spite of what proved to be an up-and-down season for Morton, Muirhead was a consistent source of goals for the club, especially in the middle of the season, as he not only bagged his first career hattrick in a 4–1 cup win over Kelty Hearts on 14 October 2023, he also bagged his second "perfect" hattrick in a 3–0 home victory against Ayr United just 3 months later on 2 January 2024.

Similar to the 22/23 season, not only did Morton finish 5th, but Muirhead was the club's top goalscorer again, scoring 17 goals in 45 games, bettering his tally from the previous season by 4 goals. This, however, would prove to be Muirhead's final season at Cappielow, as on 10 May 2024, Morton announced that Muirhead would be departing the club upon the expiry of his contract in summer 2024. In his time at Greenock Morton (2019-2024), Muirhead racked up a total of 167 appearances, scoring 44 goals.

=== Livingston ===
On 10 May 2024, Livingston Football Club announced that Robbie Muirhead had signed a pre-contract agreement, and would join the club upon the expiry of his contract at Greenock Morton in summer 2024.

== International career ==
Muirhead has previously represented Scotland at U16, U17, U18 and U19 international levels. While playing for Scotland U19, Muirhead scored a goal that was nominated for a "goal of the season" award by UEFA. On 13 March 2018, Muirhead was called up to the Scotland U21 national team for the first time.

== Career statistics ==
As of match played 25 October 2025

Appearances and goals by club, season and competition
Club	Season	League			National cup		League cup		Other		Total	
Club	Season	Division	Apps	Goals	Apps	Goals	Apps	Goals	Apps	Goals	Apps	Goals
Kilmarnock	2012–13	Scottish Premier League	1	0	0	0	0	0	—		1	0
Kilmarnock	2013–14	Scottish Premiership	21	2	0	0	0	0	—		21	2
Kilmarnock	2014–15	Scottish Premiership	20	2	1	0	1	0	—		22	2
Kilmarnock	Total		42	4	1	0	1	0	—		44	4
Dundee United	2014–15	Scottish Premiership	13	2	0	0	0	0	—		13	2
Dundee United	2015–16	Scottish Premiership	3	0	0	0	0	0	—		3	0
Dundee United	Total		16	2	0	0	0	0	—		16	2
Partick Thistle (loan)	2015–16	Scottish Premiership	8	2	0	0	0	0	—		8	2
Heart of Midlothian	2016–17	Scottish Premiership	18	2	0	0	1	0	0	0	19	2
Milton Keynes Dons	2016–17	League One	19	2	—		—		—		19	2
Milton Keynes Dons	2017–18	League One	30	3	1	0	2	0	4 (Note: Appearance(s) in EFL Trophy)	0	37	3
Milton Keynes Dons	2018–19	League Two	0	0	0	0	1	0	0	0	1	0
Milton Keynes Dons	Total		49	5	1	0	3	0	4	0	57	5
Dunfermline Athletic (loan)	2018–19	Scottish Championship	12	0	1	0	0	0	1 (Note: Appearance(s) in Scottish Challenge Cup)	0	14	0
Greenock Morton	2019–20	Scottish Championship	13	0	2	0	3	1	1	0	19	1
Greenock Morton	2020–21	Scottish Championship	13	1	3	1	4	0	4 (Note: Appearance(s) in Scottish Championship play-offs)	3	24	5
Greenock Morton	2021–22	Scottish Championship	31	4	2	2	3	2	2	1	38	9
Greenock Morton	2022–23	Scottish Championship	35	10	2	2	3	0	1	0	41	12
Greenock Morton	2023–24	Scottish Championship	33	12	4	1	5	0	3	4	45	17
Greenock Morton	Total		125	27	13	6	18	3	11	8	167	44
Livingston	2024–25	Scottish Championship	33	13	4	1	4	2	7 (Note: Three appearances, two goals in Scottish Challenge Cup; Four appearances, one goal in Scottish Premiership play-offs)	3	48	19
Livingston	2025–26	Scottish Premiership	7	1	0	0	5	3	—		12	4
Livingston	Total		40	14	4	1	9	5	7	3	60	23
Career total			310	56	20	7	32	8	23	11	385	82

== Honours ==
Livingston

- Scottish Challenge Cup: 2024–25
- Scottish Premiership play-offs: 2025
