= Jamie Brandon =

Scottish footballer (born 1998)

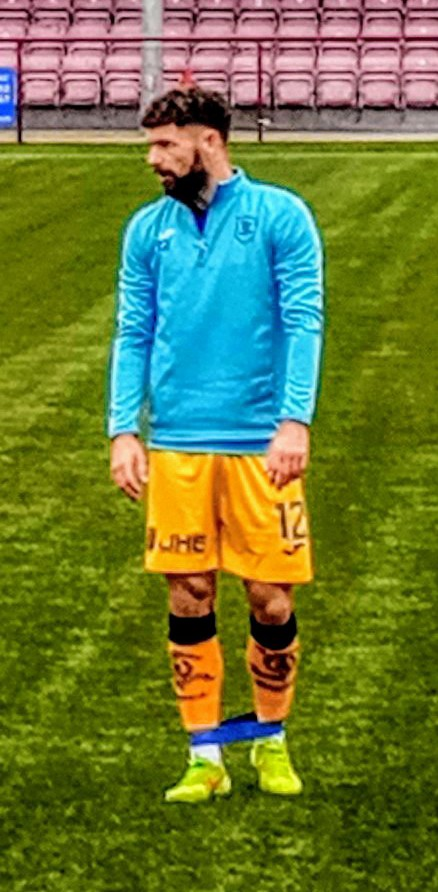
- Brandon in 2024, with Livingston FC

Personal information
- Full name: Jamie Brandon
- Date of birth: 5 February 1998 (age 28)
- Place of birth: Whitburn, West Lothian, Scotland
- Position: Defender

Team information
- Current team: Kilmarnock
- Number: 2

Youth career
- 2004–2016: Rangers
- 2016–2017: Heart of Midlothian

Senior career*
| Years | Team | Apps | (Gls) |
| 2017–2022 | Heart of Midlothian | 30 | (0) |
| 2022 | → Greenock Morton (loan) | 13 | (0) |
| 2022–2025 | Livingston | 74 | (1) |
| 2025– | Kilmarnock | 12 | (0) |

International career^{‡}
| 2019 | Scotland U21 | 2 | (0) |
- * Club domestic league appearances and goals as of 20 May 2026 ‡ National team caps and goals as of 2 June 2019 (UTC)

Jamie Brandon (born 5 February 1998) is a Scottish footballer who plays as a right-back, midfielder or right winger for Premiership club Kilmarnock. Brandon has previously played for Heart of Midlothian, Greenock Morton, and Livingston.

== Career ==
=== Heart of Midlothian ===
Brandon began his football career with Rangers at the age of 6, before signing his first professional contract in May 2015. He was released by Rangers in May 2016, before joining Heart of Midlothian alongside fellow youth Rory Currie.

Brandon made his professional debut for Hearts on 21 May 2017, playing from the start in a 2–0 defeat against Celtic at Celtic Park. Having played in every pre-season friendly at the start of the 2017–18 season, his next appearance was in the League Cup against Dunfermline Athletic on 29 July 2017. He had been due to appear as a substitute in the previous game versus Peterhead, however was not allowed to enter the field of play due to an error on the teamsheet.

On 10 January 2022, Brandon was loaned to Scottish Championship club Greenock Morton until the end of the season.

=== Livingston ===
On 10 May 2022, Brandon signed a pre-contract agreement to join Livingston on a free transfer upon the expiration of his Hearts contract.

=== International ===
Brandon made his debut for the Scotland under-21 team in March 2019.

== Career statistics ==
As of match played 1 July 2021

Appearances and goals by club, season and competition
| Club | Season | League | | | Scottish Cup | | League Cup | | Other | | Total | |
| Club | Season | Division | Apps | Goals | Apps | Goals | Apps | Goals | Apps | Goals | Apps | Goals |
|---|---|---|---|---|---|---|---|---|---|---|---|---|
| Heart of Midlothian | 2016–17 | Premiership | 1 | 0 | 0 | 0 | 0 | 0 | 0 | 0 | 1 | 0 |
| Heart of Midlothian | 2017–18 | Premiership | 12 | 0 | 0 | 0 | 1 | 0 | — | | 13 | 0 |
| Heart of Midlothian | 2018–19 | Premiership | 7 | 0 | 0 | 0 | 0 | 0 | — | | 7 | 0 |
| Heart of Midlothian | 2019–20 | Premiership | 9 | 0 | 0 | 0 | 0 | 0 | — | | 9 | 0 |
| Heart of Midlothian | 2020–21 | Championship | 1 | 0 | 0 | 0 | 4 | 0 | 0 | 0 | 5 | 0 |
| Heart of Midlothian | 2021–22 | Premiership | 0 | 0 | 0 | 0 | 0 | 0 | 0 | 0 | 0 | 0 |
| Heart of Midlothian | Total | | 30 | 0 | 0 | 0 | 5 | 0 | 0 | 0 | 35 | 0 |
| Greenock Morton (loan) | 2021–22 | Championship | 13 | 0 | 1 | 0 | 0 | 0 | 0 | 0 | 14 | 0 |
| Career total | | | 43 | 0 | 1 | 0 | 5 | 0 | 0 | 0 | 49 | 0 |

== Honours ==
Livingston

- Scottish Challenge Cup: 2024–25
- Scottish Premiership play-offs: 2025
