= Celtic F.C. Foundation =

Organization

Celtic FC Foundation
- Founded: 2013
- Founder: Celtic Football Club
- Type: Not-for-profit
- Location: Glasgow, UK
- Region served: Scotland; Various

Celtic FC Foundation is a registered charity (Scottish Charity number SC024648).

Celtic Football Club was initially founded to raise money for the poor in the East End of Glasgow and the club still retain strong charitable traditions today.

In 1995 the Celtic Charity Fund was formed by the football club as a charitable trust with the aim of "revitalising Celtic's charitable traditions", and by 2013 had raised over £5 million. In 2006 The Celtic Foundation was established within the football club itself to co-ordinate the club's social, educational and community work under one umbrella. Celtic FC Foundation was established in late 2013 by merging The Charity Fund with the Celtic Foundation, establishing a stronger charity with a wider role and greater reach.

Led by the Chief Executive and staff, the priority of Celtic FC Foundation is to provide assistance to those who face daily challenges within the following key priority areas:

- Improve Health
- Promote Equality
- Encourage Learning
- Tackle Poverty

In addition, Celtic FC Foundation offers support in the form of delivery and/or partnership to external charities and other organisations who offer value in the community and whose principles fit within these key priority areas.
