= 2024–25 Scottish Challenge Cup =

Tournament details
- Country: Scotland; England
- Dates: 30 July 2024 – 30 March 2025
- Teams: 52

Final positions
- Champions: Livingston
- Runners-up: Queen's Park

Tournament statistics
- Matches played: 51
- Goals scored: 171 (3.35 per match)
- Top goal scorer(s): Stevie May (4 goals)
- All statistics correct as of 30 March 2025.

The 2024–25 Scottish Challenge Cup, known as the SPFL Trust Trophy due to sponsorship reasons, was the 33rd season of the competition. The total number of participating clubs was 52. The competition began on 30 July 2024 with the first round and the final took place on 30 March 2025.

Thirty teams from the Championship, League One and League Two competed, along with five teams from the Highland Football League and six from the Lowland Football League. In addition to this, Under-21 teams from 11 of the 12 clubs who competed in the Scottish Premiership were represented.

The defending champions were Airdrieonians, who lost 6–5 on penalties to East Kilbride in the Fourth round.

== Format ==
Round	Date	Fixtures	Clubs	New entries
First Round	30–31 July 2024	11	52 → 41	6 teams from 2023–24 Lowland Football League (East Kilbride, Bo'ness United, Albion Rovers, Cowdenbeath, Berwick Rangers & East Stirlingshire); 5 teams from 2023–24 Highland Football League (1st–5th); 11 U21 teams from 2024–25 Scottish Premiership
Second Round	13–14 August 2024	9	41 → 32	7 teams from 2023–24 Scottish League Two (4th–10th)
Third Round	7–8 September 2024	16	32 → 16	1 team from 2023–24 Scottish Premiership (12th); 9 teams from 2023–24 Scottish Championship (2nd–10th); 10 teams from 2023–24 Scottish League One; 3 teams from 2023–24 Scottish League Two (1st–3rd)
Fourth Round	12–13 October 2024	8	16 → 8	
Quarter-finals	12–13 November 2024	4	8 → 4	
Semi-finals	28–29 January 2025	2	4 → 2	
Final	30 March 2025	1	2 → 1	

== First round ==
The first round featured 5 clubs from the 2023–24 Scottish Highland Football League, 6 clubs from the 2023–24 Scottish Lowland Football League and 11 of the 12 under-21 teams of the 2024–25 Scottish Premiership, with Ross County not entering an under-21 team.

The draw was made on 8 July 2024 at 13:00 and broadcast live on the SPFL YouTube Channel. The draw was regionalised and all non-Under 21 teams were seeded. The matches were played on 30 & 31 July 2024.

=== North Section ===
==== Draw ====
Teams that entered the competition in the first round.

Seeded Teams	Unseeded Teams
Buckie Thistle; Brechin City; Fraserburgh; Banks O'Dee; Formartine United	Aberdeen B; Dundee B; Dundee United B; Heart of Midlothian B; St Johnstone B

==== Matches ====
30 July 2024	Fraserburgh	1–1 (5–4 p)	Heart of Midlothian B	Fraserburgh
19:30	Butcher 73'		Ross 29'	Stadium: Bellslea Park; Attendance: 211; Referee: Jamie McCunnie
	Penalties
	Simpson (penalty scored); Butcher (penalty scored); West (penalty scored); Wood (penalty missed); Buchan (penalty scored); Hay (penalty scored)		(penalty scored) Sandilands; (penalty scored) Forrester; (penalty scored) Ross; (penalty missed) Stevenson; (penalty scored) Plank; (penalty missed) Lister

30 July 2024	Banks O'Dee	1–0	Aberdeen B	Aberdeen
19:45	Philipson 33'			Stadium: Spain Park; Attendance: 460; Referee: Steven MacDonald

30 July 2024	Dundee B	2–0	Formartine United	Brechin
19:45	Mohammed 14'; Sweenie-Rowe 19'			Stadium: Glebe Park; Attendance: 145; Referee: Ryan Kennedy

30 July 2024	Buckie Thistle	1–3	Dundee United B	Buckie
20:00	Peters 54'		Stirton 18'; Cameron 81'; O'Donnell 88'	Stadium: Victoria Park; Attendance: 640; Referee: Michael McCart

31 July 2024	St Johnstone B	2–1	Brechin City	Perth
19:45	Essel 50'; Smith 90'		Robertson 28'	Stadium: McDiarmid Park; Attendance: 259; Referee: Connor Ashwood

=== South Section ===
==== Draw ====
Teams that entered the competition in the first round.

Seeded Teams	Unseeded Teams
East Kilbride; Bo'ness United; Albion Rovers; Cowdenbeath; Berwick Rangers; East Stirlingshire	Celtic B; Hibernian B; Kilmarnock B; Motherwell B; Rangers B; St Mirren B

==== Matches ====
30 July 2024	Berwick Rangers	3–0 (awarded)	St Mirren B	Berwick-upon-Tweed, England
19:45	McNamara 34'; Devers 50'		Sutherland 4'; Mooney 7'; McCormick 12'	Stadium: Shielfield Park; Attendance: 288; Referee: Keiran Trayner

30 July 2024	Cowdenbeath	4–2	Kilmarnock B	Cowdenbeath
19:45	McLean 11', 74'; McDonald 72'; Kerr 90'		McLean 37' (o.g.); Cooper 41'	Stadium: Central Park; Attendance: 171; Referee: Andrew Craven

30 July 2024	East Kilbride	3–0	Celtic B	East Kilbride
19:45	Elliott 5'; Robertson 22'; Leitch 61'			Stadium: K-Park Training Academy; Attendance: 330; Referee: Ross Menzies

30 July 2024	Hibernian B	3–3 (2–4 p)	Albion Rovers	Edinburgh
19:45	McAllister 21'; McMurdo 72', 79'		McMahon 18'; Home 53'; Paton 90'	Stadium: Ainslie Park; Attendance: 140; Referee: Harry Bruce
	Penalties
	McAllister (penalty missed); Megwa (penalty missed); Davidson (penalty scored); Landers (penalty scored)		(penalty scored) Duncan; (penalty scored) McCaw; (penalty missed) Prince; (penalty scored) Home; (penalty scored) Paton

30 July 2024	Motherwell B	0–0 (7–8 p)	East Stirlingshire	Motherwell
19:45				Stadium: Fir Park; Attendance: 338; Referee: Ross Birrell
	Penalties
	Booth (penalty scored); Ferrie (penalty scored); Ross (penalty scored); Nelson (penalty scored); Lawson (penalty missed); Tomany (penalty scored); Flatman (penalty scored); McDermott (penalty missed); Marshall (penalty scored); Williamson (penalty missed)		(penalty missed) Spence; (penalty scored) Flynn; (penalty scored) Gomis; (penalty scored) Reilly; (penalty scored) O'Neill; (penalty scored) Curtis; (penalty scored) Pyper; (penalty missed) Campbell; (penalty scored) Liddell; (penalty scored) Brown

30 July 2024	Rangers B	3–1	Bo'ness United	Greenock
20:00	Nsio 24'; Stevens 32'; Curtis 43'		Malcolm 1'	Stadium: Cappielow; Attendance: 266; Referee: Jamie Wilkie

Note

1. A: Berwick Rangers were awarded a technical 3−0 win over St Mirren B, who fielded an ineligible player. The match had originally finished 3–2 to St Mirren.

== Second round ==
The second round featured the 11 winners from the previous round, along with 7 clubs from 2023–24 Scottish League Two.

The draw for the second round was made on 8 July 2024 along with the first round draw. The draw was regionalised, but not seeded. The matches were played on 13 and 14 August 2024.

=== North Section ===
==== Draw ====
Teams that entered the competition in the second round.

- East Fife
- Forfar Athletic
- Elgin City

==== Matches ====
13 August 2024	Dundee United B	0–0 (3–1 p)	Dundee B	Dundee
18:30				Stadium: Tannadice Park; Attendance: 681; Referee: Peter Stuart
	Penalties
	O'Donnell (penalty scored); Mwangi (penalty scored); Dewar (penalty scored)		(penalty scored) Lorimer; (penalty missed) Richardson; (penalty missed) Clark; (penalty missed) Graham

13 August 2024	East Fife	2–1	St Johnstone B	Methil
19:45	Austin 49'; Shepherd 51'		Kirk 9'	Stadium: Bayview Stadium; Attendance: 295; Referee: Joel Kennedy

13 August 2024	Elgin City	2–1	Banks O'Dee	Elgin
19:45	Dingwall 56' (pen.); Gavin 65'		Antoniazzi 22'	Stadium: Borough Briggs; Attendance: 370; Referee: Ryan Lee

13 August 2024	Fraserburgh	2–1	Forfar Athletic	Fraserburgh
20:00	Barbour 76'; Wood 86'		Reekie 19'	Stadium: Bellslea Park; Attendance: 254; Referee: Daniel Graves

=== South Section ===
==== Draw ====
Teams that entered the competition in the second round.

- Dumbarton
- Bonnyrigg Rose
- Clyde
- Stranraer

==== Matches ====
13 August 2024	Albion Rovers	3–4	Cowdenbeath	Coatbridge
19:45	Reid 22'; Kennedy 65', 68'		Fernie 58' (o.g.); Sutherland 64'; Docherty 83' (pen.); McLean 88'	Stadium: Cliftonhill; Attendance: 158; Referee: Andy Gamble

13 August 2024	Dumbarton	4–0	Berwick Rangers	Dumbarton
19:45	McGuffie 7', 31'; Ruth 23'; Wilson 37'			Stadium: Dumbarton Football Stadium; Attendance: 240; Referee: Gary Hanvidge

13 August 2024	Stranraer	2–1	Bonnyrigg Rose	Stranraer
19:45	Russell 32'; Ross 57'		Ross 84' (o.g.)	Stadium: Stair Park; Attendance: 341; Referee: Alex Shepherd

14 August 2024	Clyde	2–3	Rangers B	Hamilton
19:45	Dunachie 43' (pen.); Leitch 85'		Lowry 59', 90'; Burnside 69'	Stadium: New Douglas Park; Attendance: 607; Referee: Gary Hanvidge

14 August 2024	East Stirlingshire	2–2 (1–3 p)	East Kilbride	Stenhousemuir
19:45	Spence 18'; Penker 55'		Elliott 43'; Spence 47'	Stadium: Ochilview Park; Attendance: 170; Referee: Alastair Grieve
	Penalties
	Murray (penalty missed); Spence (penalty scored); Penker (penalty missed); Curtis (penalty missed)		(penalty missed) McDonald; (penalty scored) Spence; (penalty missed) Boyd; (penalty scored) Robertson; (penalty scored) Lockie

== Third round ==
The third round featured the nine winners from the previous round, along with all ten clubs from both the Championship and League One, and three clubs from League Two.

The draw was made on 19 August 2024 at 15:00 and broadcast live on the SPFL YouTube Channel.

=== Draw ===
Teams that entered the competition in the third round.

- Airdrieonians
- Alloa Athletic
- Annan Athletic
- Arbroath
- Ayr United
- Cove Rangers
- Dunfermline Athletic
- Edinburgh City
- Falkirk
- Greenock Morton
- Hamilton Academical
- Inverness Caledonian Thistle
- Kelty Hearts
- Livingston
- Montrose
- Partick Thistle
- Peterhead
- Queen of the South
- Queen's Park
- Raith Rovers
- Stenhousemuir
- Stirling Albion
- The Spartans

==== Matches ====
3 September 2024	Hamilton Academical	4–0	Dundee United B	Hamilton
19:45	O'Hara 4', 49'; MacDonald 7'; Shaw 89'			Stadium: New Douglas Park; Attendance: 308; Referee: Stewart Luke

7 September 2024	Stranraer	1–5	Annan Athletic	Stranraer
15:00	Dunlop 29'		Smith 7', 90'; Gibson 38' (pen.); Wood 42'; Dixon 61'	Stadium: Stair Park; Attendance: 469; Referee: Alastair Grieve

7 September 2024	East Fife	0–2	Dunfermline Athletic	Methil
15:00			Comrie 53'; McCann 58'	Stadium: Bayview Stadium; Attendance: 1,264; Referee: Iain Snedden

7 September 2024	Inverness Caledonian Thistle	3–0	Stirling Albion	Inverness
15:00	Brooks 29', 38'; MacKinnon 60'			Stadium: Caledonian Stadium; Attendance: 774; Referee: Ryan Lee

7 September 2024	East Kilbride	3–2	Cove Rangers	East Kilbride
15:00	Livingstone 3'; Leitch 87'; Boyd 90'		Megginson 14'; Gaffney 84'	Stadium: K-Park Training Academy; Attendance: 253; Referee: Joel Kennedy

7 September 2024	Peterhead	1–0	Dumbarton	Peterhead
15:00	Barry 66'			Stadium: Balmoor Stadium; Attendance: 586; Referee: Greg Soutar

7 September 2024	Kelty Hearts	3–1	Elgin City	Kelty
15:00	Johnston 32', 40'; Williamson 58'		Cameron 84'	Stadium: New Central Park; Attendance: 268; Referee: Sean Murdoch

7 September 2024	Partick Thistle	1–3	Alloa Athletic	Glasgow
15:00	Graham 14'		Cawley 65', 76'; Taggart 90' (pen.)	Stadium: Firhill Stadium; Attendance: 1,969; Referee: Duncan Williams

7 September 2024	The Spartans	0–2	Livingston	Edinburgh
15:00			May 65'; Smith 81'	Stadium: Ainslie Park; Attendance: 681; Referee: Steven Kirkland

7 September 2024	Arbroath	3–0	Montrose	Arbroath
15:00	O'Brien 23' (pen.); Stewart 29'; Callaghan 82'			Stadium: Gayfield Park; Attendance: 1,051; Referee: George Calder

7 September 2024	Cowdenbeath	0–1	Greenock Morton	Cowdenbeath
15:00			Garrity 62'	Stadium: Central Park; Attendance: 379; Referee: Duncan Nicolson

7 September 2024	Stenhousemuir	1–1 (5–4 p)	Falkirk	Stenhousemuir
15:00	Alston 84' (pen.)		Miller 89'	Stadium: Ochilview Park; Attendance: 2,426; Referee: Gavin Duncan
	Penalties
	Alston (penalty scored); Aitken (penalty scored); O'Reilly (penalty scored); Taylor (penalty scored); Meechan (penalty scored)		(penalty missed) Donaldson; (penalty scored) MacIver; (penalty scored) Tait; (penalty scored) Miller; (penalty scored) Oliver

7 September 2024	Queen of the South	0–3	Airdrieonians	Dumfries
15:00			Frizzell 8'; Mochrie 64'; McGregor 71'	Stadium: Palmerston Park; Attendance: 957; Referee: Lloyd Wilson

8 September 2024	Ayr United	3–2	Raith Rovers	Ayr
13:00	Dowds 49' (pen.), 69'; Oakley 70'		Smith 11'; Easton 15'	Stadium: Somerset Park; Attendance: 1,750; Referee: Graham Grainger

8 September 2024	Queen's Park	1–0	Edinburgh City	Glasgow
15:00	Turner 59'			Stadium: Lesser Hampden; Attendance: 597; Referee: Peter Stuart

17 September 2024	Rangers B	5–0	Fraserburgh	Stirling
19:45	Allan 16'; West 23' (o.g.); Eadie 49'; Adamson 61'; Gentles 80'			Stadium: Forthbank Stadium; Attendance: 381; Referee: Jordan Curran

== Fourth round ==
The draw was made on 10 September 2024 at 13:00 and broadcast live on the SPFL YouTube Channel.

Teams in italics were unknown at the time of the draw.

Teams in bold progressed to the quarter-finals.

Championship	League One	League Two	Lowland League	Premiership U21 teams
Airdrieonians; **Ayr United**; **Dunfermline Athletic**; **Greenock Morton**; Hamilton Academical; **Livingston**; **Queen's Park**	**Alloa Athletic**; Annan Athletic; Arbroath; Inverness Caledonian Thistle; Kelty Hearts; Stenhousemuir	Peterhead	**East Kilbride**	**Rangers B**

=== Matches ===
11 October 2024	Hamilton Academical	**0–1**	**Greenock Morton**	Hamilton
19:40			Stuparević 17' (pen.)	Stadium: New Douglas Park; Attendance: 711; Referee: Ross Hardie

11 October 2024	Annan Athletic	**1–4**	**Queen's Park**	Annan
19:45	Maxwell 85'		McLeish 16'; Duncan 28'; Rudden 63'; Ujdur 76'	Stadium: Galabank; Attendance: 423; Referee: Gavin Duncan

11 October 2024	**Alloa Athletic**	**1–0**	Arbroath	Alloa
19:45	Donnelly 16'			Stadium: Recreation Park; Attendance: 480; Referee: Euan Anderson

12 October 2024	**Dunfermline Athletic**	**2–1**	Kelty Hearts	Dunfermline
13:00	Kane 23'; Todd 32'		Johnston 15'	Stadium: East End Park; Attendance: 1,821; Referee: Graham Grainger

12 October 2024	Airdrieonians	**1–1** (**5–6** p)	**East Kilbride**	Airdrie
13:30	Gallagher 86'		McGregor 39'	Stadium: Excelsior Stadium; Attendance: 703; Referee: Greg Soutar
	**Penalties**
	Wilson (penalty scored); Gallagher (penalty scored); Taylor-Sinclair (penalty scored); Watson (penalty scored); Cooper (penalty scored); Mochrie (penalty missed)		(penalty scored) Elliott; (penalty scored) Leitch; (penalty scored) Spence; (penalty scored) Robertson; (penalty scored) Mimnaugh; (penalty scored) Ferguson

12 October 2024	**Ayr United**	**2–1**	Peterhead	Ayr
14:00	Murphy 34'; Walker 53'		Smith 62'	Stadium: Somerset Park; Attendance: 1,698; Referee: George Calder

12 October 2024	**Livingston**	**2–2** (**5–4** p)	Inverness Caledonian Thistle	Livingston
14:00	May 17'; Pittman 28'		Allan 10'; Gilmour 30'	Stadium: Almondvale Stadium; Attendance: 943; Referee: Colin Steven
	**Penalties**
	Shinnie (penalty scored); McGowan (penalty scored); Winter (penalty scored); Yengi (penalty scored); Kelly (penalty scored)		(penalty scored) Davidson; (penalty scored) Gilmour; (penalty scored) Savage; (penalty scored) McKay; (penalty missed) Thompson

22 October 2024	**Rangers B**	**4–1**	Stenhousemuir	Stirling
19:45	Curtis 19', 60'; Danilo 41'; Hagi 90'		Alston 66'	Stadium: Forthbank Stadium; Attendance: 525; Referee: Alastair Grieve

== Quarter-finals ==
The draw was made on 16 October 2024 at 13:00 and broadcast live on the SPFL YouTube Channel along with the semi-finals draw.

Teams in italics were unknown at the time of the draw.

Teams in bold progressed to the semi-finals.

Championship	League One	Lowland League	Premiership U21 teams
Ayr United; **Dunfermline Athletic**; Greenock Morton; **Livingston**; **Queen's Park**	Alloa Athletic	**East Kilbride**	Rangers B

=== Matches ===
12 November 2024	**East Kilbride**	**3–2**	Ayr United	East Kilbride
19:40	Robertson 1'; Baldé 12'; Elliott 67'		Henderson 58'; Rus 64'	Stadium: K-Park Training Academy; Attendance: 605; Referee: Ryan Lee

12 November 2024	**Livingston**	**2–1**	Greenock Morton	Livingston
19:45	McAlear 41'; May 87'		Samuels 90'	Stadium: Almondvale Stadium; Attendance: 858; Referee: Chris Graham

12 November 2024	**Dunfermline Athletic**	**1–0**	Alloa Athletic	Dunfermline
19:45	McCann 37'			Stadium: East End Park; Attendance: 1,400; Referee: Duncan Williams

3 December 2024	**Queen's Park**	**3–1**	Rangers B	Glasgow
19:45	Thomas 47'; Turner 55'; Hutton 68' (o.g.)		McKinnon 26'	Stadium: Lesser Hampden; Attendance: 692; Referee: Peter Stuart

== Semi-finals ==
The draw was made on 16 October 2024 at 13:00 along with the quarter-finals draw.

=== Matches ===
28 January 2025	Queen's Park	6–2 (a.e.t.)	East Kilbride	Glasgow
19:45	Rudden 1', 97'; Duncan 22'; Evans 92', 109'; Connelly 97' (o.g.)		Leitch 31'; D.Ferguson 44'	Stadium: Lesser Hampden; Attendance: 758; Referee: Lloyd Wilson

5 February 2025	Dunfermline Athletic	0–2	Livingston	Dunfermline
19:35			Muirhead 41'; Yengi 89'	Stadium: East End Park; Attendance: 2,072; Referee: Duncan Williams

== Final ==
30 March 2025
16:10

Queen's Park	0–5	Livingston
		Muirhead 26'; May 45'; Yengi 50'; Shinnie 82'; Brandon 90'

Falkirk Stadium, Falkirk
Attendance: 4,079
Referee: Calum Scott
