= 2024–25 Scottish Premiership =

128th season of top-tier football league in Scotland

Scottish Premiership
- Season: 2024–25
- Dates: 3 August 2024 – 18 May 2025
- Champions: Celtic; 11th Premiership title 55th Scottish title
- Relegated: Ross County; St Johnstone
- Champions League: Celtic; Rangers
- Europa League: Aberdeen; Hibernian
- Conference League: Dundee United
- Matches: 228
- Goals: 675 (2.96 per match)
- Top goalscorer: Cyriel Dessers (18 goals)
- Biggest home win: Rangers 6–0 Ross County (24 August 2024); Rangers 6–0 Kilmarnock (4 December 2024); Celtic 6–0 Dundee (5 February 2025)
- Biggest away win: St Johnstone 0–6 Celtic (28 September 2024); Dundee 0–6 Heart of Midlothian (1 February 2025)
- Highest scoring: Motherwell 4–3 Dundee United (14 December 2024); Dundee 3–4 Rangers (29 March 2025)
- Longest winning run: Aberdeen; Celtic (7 games)
- Longest unbeaten run: Celtic (18 games)
- Longest winless run: Aberdeen (14 games)
- Longest losing run: Ross County (7 games)
- Highest attendance: 59,612; Celtic 3–0 Rangers (1 September 2024)
- Lowest attendance: 1,872; St Johnstone 1–0 Kilmarnock (23 November 2024)
- Total attendance: 3,944,758
- Average attendance: 17,302

The 2024–25 Scottish Premiership (known as the William Hill Premiership for sponsorship reasons) was the twelfth season of the Scottish Premiership, the highest division of Scottish football, and the 128th edition overall of the top national league competition, not including one cancelled due to World War II. The season began on 3 August 2024.

Twelve teams contested the league: Aberdeen, Celtic, Dundee, Dundee United, Heart of Midlothian, Hibernian, Kilmarnock, Motherwell, Rangers, Ross County, St Johnstone and St Mirren.

On 26 April 2025, Celtic secured a fourth Premiership title in a row and a record-tying 55th Scottish league title overall, following a 5–0 victory away to Dundee United.

== Teams ==
The following teams changed division after the 2023–24 season.

Promoted from the Championship

- Dundee United

Relegated to the Championship

- Livingston

=== Stadia and locations ===
Aberdeen	Celtic	Dundee	Dundee United
Pittodrie Stadium	Celtic Park	Dens Park	Tannadice Park
Capacity: 20,866	Capacity: 60,411	Capacity: 11,775	Capacity: 14,223
Heart of Midlothian	Location of teams in the 2024–25 Scottish Premiership		Hibernian
Tynecastle Park	Location of teams in the 2024–25 Scottish Premiership		Easter Road
Capacity: 19,852	Location of teams in the 2024–25 Scottish Premiership		Capacity: 20,421
Kilmarnock	Location of teams in the 2024–25 Scottish Premiership		Motherwell
Rugby Park	Location of teams in the 2024–25 Scottish Premiership		Fir Park
Capacity: 15,003	Location of teams in the 2024–25 Scottish Premiership		Capacity: 13,677
Rangers	Ross County	St Johnstone	St Mirren
Ibrox Stadium	Victoria Park	McDiarmid Park	St Mirren Park
Capacity: 51,700	Capacity: 6,541	Capacity: 10,696	Capacity: 7,937

Premiership football clubs in Dundee
Premiership football clubs in Edinburgh
Premiership football clubs in Glasgow

=== Personnel and kits ===
Team	Manager	Captain	Kit manufacturer	Shirt sponsor (front)	Shirt sponsor (back)	Shirt sponsor (sleeve)	Shorts sponsor
Aberdeen	(Sweden) Jimmy Thelin	(Scotland) Graeme Shinnie	Adidas	Texo Group	MaxAmaze, EIS Waste Services	RAM Tubulars	Texo Group
Celtic	(Northern Ireland) Brendan Rodgers	(Scotland) Callum McGregor	Adidas	Dafabet	Magners	Celtic FC Foundation	None
Dundee	(Scotland) Tony Docherty	(Republic of Ireland) Joe Shaughnessy	Macron	Crown Engineering Services	MKM Building Supplies, John Clark BMW	GA Vans	DrainBlitz
Dundee United	(Republic of Ireland) Jim Goodwin	(Scotland) Ross Docherty	Erreà	Quinn Casino	JF Kegs, Norman Jamieson Ltd	Trade-Mart	Paint-Tec Accident Repair Centre
Heart of Midlothian	(Scotland) Liam Fox (interim)	(Scotland) Lawrence Shankland	Umbro	Stellar Omada	FanHub, loveholidays	ASC Edinburgh Ltd	None
Hibernian	(Scotland) David Gray	(England) Joe Newell	Joma	Bevvy.com	Whisky Row, Dunedin IT	SBK	Capital Credit Union
Kilmarnock	(Scotland) Derek McInnes	(Northern Ireland) Kyle Vassell	Hummel	James Frew Ltd	James Frew Ltd, Blackwood Plant Hire	Redrock Automation	A&L Mechanical
Motherwell	(Germany) Michael Wimmer	(Scotland) Paul McGinn	Macron	G4 Claims	Fire Suppression Scotland, Phoenix Specialist Solutions	DX Home Improvements	TCL
Rangers	(Scotland) Barry Ferguson (interim)	(England) James Tavernier	Castore	Unibet	SEKO Logistics	BOXT Life	AIM Building and Maintenance
Ross County	(Scotland) Don Cowie	(England) Connor Randall	Macron	Ross-shire Engineering	Ross-shire Engineering	Mikeysline (Away)	None
St Johnstone	(Finland) Simo Valakari	(Scotland) Nicky Clark	Macron	GS Brown Construction	Sidey Solutions, A & B Taxis Perth	Saints in the Community	CHAS Children's Hospice
St Mirren	(Northern Ireland) Stephen Robinson	(Scotland) Mark O'Hara	Macron	Consilium Plumbing and Heating	Ultimate Home Solutions, Macklin Motors	Gennaro Glass & Glazing	KPP Chartered Accountants

=== Managerial changes ===
Team	Outgoing manager	Manner of departure	Date of vacancy	Position in table	Incoming manager	Date of appointment
Aberdeen	(Scotland) Peter Leven	End of interim spell	19 May 2024	Pre-season	(Sweden) Jimmy Thelin	3 June 2024
St Johnstone	(Scotland) Craig Levein	Sacked	17 September 2024	10th	(Northern Ireland) Andy Kirk (interim)	17 September 2024
Heart of Midlothian	(Scotland) Steven Naismith	Sacked	22 September 2024	12th	(Scotland) Liam Fox (interim)	22 September 2024
St Johnstone	(Northern Ireland) Andy Kirk	End of interim spell	1 October 2024	11th	(Finland) Simo Valakari	1 October 2024
Heart of Midlothian	(Scotland) Liam Fox	End of interim spell	15 October 2024	12th	(England) Neil Critchley	15 October 2024
Motherwell	(Scotland) Stuart Kettlewell	Resigned	27 January 2025	5th	(Scotland) Stephen Frail (interim)	27 January 2025
Motherwell	(Scotland) Stephen Frail	End of interim spell	17 February 2025	8th	(Germany) Michael Wimmer	17 February 2025
Rangers	(Belgium) Philippe Clement	Sacked	23 February 2025	2nd	(Scotland) Barry Ferguson (interim)	24 February 2025
Heart of Midlothian	(England) Neil Critchley	Sacked	26 April 2025	8th	(Scotland) Liam Fox (interim)	26 April 2025

== Format ==
In the initial phase of the season, the 12 teams played a round-robin tournament, whereby each team played each one of the other teams three times. After 33 matches, the league split into two sections of six teams, with each team playing each other in that section. The league attempted to balance the fixture list so that teams in the same section played each other twice at home and twice away, but sometimes this was impossible. A total of 228 matches were played, with 38 matches played by each team.

== League table ==
Pos	Team	Pld	W	D	L	GF	GA	GD	Pts	Qualification or relegation (Note: Teams play each other three times (33 matches), before the league is split into two groups (the top six and the bottom six).)
1	Celtic (C)	38	29	5	4	112	26	+86	92	Qualification for the Champions League play-off round
2	Rangers	38	22	9	7	80	41	+39	75	Qualification for the Champions League second qualifying round
3	Hibernian	38	15	13	10	62	50	+12	58	Qualification for the Europa League second qualifying round
4	Dundee United	38	15	8	15	45	54	−9	53	Qualification for the Conference League second qualifying round
5	Aberdeen	38	15	8	15	48	61	−13	53	Qualification for the Europa League play-off round (Note: Aberdeen qualified for the Europa League play-off round as the 2024–25 Scottish Cup winners.)
6	St Mirren	38	14	8	16	53	59	−6	50	
7	Heart of Midlothian	38	15	7	16	52	47	+5	52	
8	Motherwell	38	14	7	17	46	63	−17	49	
9	Kilmarnock	38	12	8	18	45	64	−19	44	
10	Dundee	38	11	8	19	57	77	−20	41	
11	Ross County (R)	38	9	10	19	37	65	−28	37	Qualification for the Premiership play-off final
12	St Johnstone (R)	38	9	5	24	38	68	−30	32	Relegation to Championship

Rules for classification: 1) Points; 2) Goal difference; 3) Goals scored; 4) Head-to-head points; 5) Head-to-head goal difference; 6) Play-off (only if deciding champion, UEFA competitions qualification, second stage group allocation or relegation).
(C) Champions; (R) Relegated

== Results ==
=== Matches 1–33 ===
In matches 1–22, all teams played each other twice, once at home and once away. In matches 23–33, all teams played each other once, either home or away.

Home \ Away	ABE	CEL	DND	DUN	HOM	HIB	KIL	MOT	RAN	ROS	STJ	STM	ABE	CEL	DND	DUN	HOM	HIB	KIL	MOT	RAN	ROS	STJ	STM
Aberdeen	—	0–1	4–1	1–0	3–2	1–3	2–0	2–1	2–1	1–2	1–1	3–1	—	—	—	2–2	0–0	—	1–0	4–1	2–2	—	—	0–3
Celtic	2–2	—	2–0	2–0	2–0	3–0	4–0	4–0	3–0	5–0	4–0	3–0	5–1	—	6–0	3–0	3–0	—	5–1	—	2–3	—	—	—
Dundee	1–2	3–3	—	1–2	3–1	4–1	2–3	4–1	1–1	0–3	1–2	2–2	1–2	—	—	—	0–6	—	3–2	—	3–4	—	1–1	2–0
Dundee United	1–0	0–0	2–2	—	0–1	3–2	1–1	1–2	0–1	3–0	2–0	2–0	—	—	2–4	—	—	1–3	—	1–0	1–3	—	1–0	—
Heart of Midlothian	1–1	1–4	2–0	0–1	—	1–2	1–2	1–0	0–0	1–1	2–1	4–0	—	—	—	0–1	—	—	3–2	—	1–3	2–0	—	3–1
Hibernian	3–3	0–2	2–2	1–1	1–1	—	1–0	1–2	3–3	3–1	2–0	1–2	2–0	2–1	4–0	—	2–1	—	—	3–1	—	—	3–0	—
Kilmarnock	4–0	0–2	1–1	3–3	1–0	1–1	—	0–0	1–0	0–1	0–3	2–0	—	—	—	1–0	—	1–1	—	2–0	2–4	—	3–1	—
Motherwell	2–0	0–3	0–1	4–3	3–1	0–3	1–1	—	2–2	0–0	2–1	2–1	—	1–3	2–1	—	0–0	—	—	—	—	0–3	—	2–2
Rangers	3–0	3–0	1–0	1–1	1–0	1–0	6–0	2–1	—	6–0	2–0	2–1	—	—	—	—	—	0–2	—	1–2	—	4–0	3–1	0–2
Ross County	0–1	1–2	2–0	1–1	2–2	0–0	2–1	2–1	0–3	—	3–3	1–2	0–1	1–4	3–1	0–1	—	1–1	1–0	—	—	—	—	—
St Johnstone	1–2	0–6	1–3	1–2	1–2	1–1	1–0	1–2	0–1	3–0	—	2–3	0–0	1–0	—	—	1–2	—	—	2–1	—	1–0	—	—
St Mirren	2–1	0–3	1–2	0–1	2–1	3–0	2–2	0–1	2–1	0–0	2–1	—	—	2–5	—	0–1	—	0–0	5–1	—	—	3–2	0–1	—

Legend: Blue = home team win; Yellow = draw; Red = away team win.
For upcoming matches, an "a" indicates there is an article about the rivalry between the two participants.

=== Matches 34–38 ===
After 33 matches, the league was split into two sections of six teams, i.e. the top six and the bottom six, with the teams playing every other team in their section once (either at home or away). The exact matches were determined by the position of the teams in the league table at the time of the split.

==== Top 6 ====
Home \ Away	ABE	CEL	DUN	HIB	RAN	STM
Aberdeen	—	1–5	—	1–0	—	—
Celtic	—	—	—	3–1	—	1–1
Dundee United	2–1	0–5	—	—	—	0–2
Hibernian	—	—	3–1	—	2–2	—
Rangers	4–0	1–1	3–1	—	—	—
St Mirren	1–0	—	—	2–2	2–2	—

Legend: Blue = home team win; Yellow = draw; Red = away team win.

==== Bottom 6 ====
Home \ Away	DND	HOM	KIL	MOT	ROS	STJ
Dundee	—	—	—	1–2	1–1	—
Heart of Midlothian	0–1	—	—	3–0	—	2–1
Kilmarnock	3–2	0–1	—	—	2–0	—
Motherwell	—	—	3–0	—	—	3–2
Ross County	—	1–3	—	1–1	—	—
St Johnstone	0–2	—	0–2	—	2–1	—

Legend: Blue = home team win; Yellow = draw; Red = away team win.

== Season statistics ==
=== Top scorers ===
Rank	Player	Club	Goals
1	(Nigeria) Cyriel Dessers	Rangers	18
2	(Japan) Daizen Maeda	Celtic	16
2	(Scotland) Simon Murray	Dundee	16
4	(Australia) Martin Boyle	Hibernian	15
4	(England) Sam Dalby	Dundee United	15
6	(Republic of Ireland) Adam Idah	Celtic	13
6	(Germany) Nicolas Kühn	Celtic	13
8	(Czech Republic) Václav Černý	Rangers	12
8	(Northern Ireland) Ronan Hale	Ross County	12
8	(Morocco) Hamza Igamane	Rangers	12

==== Hat-tricks ====
Player	For	Against	Score	Date	Ref.
(Morocco) Hamza Igamane	Rangers	Hibernian	3–3 (A)	5 January 2025	

=== Clean sheets ===
Rank	Player	Club	Clean sheets
1	(Denmark) Kasper Schmeichel	Celtic	19
2	(England) Jack Walton	Dundee United	12
3	(England) Jack Butland	Rangers	10
4	(Scotland) Craig Gordon	Heart of Midlothian	8
5	(England) Jordan Smith	Hibernian	7

== Awards ==
Month	Manager of the Month		Player of the Month	
Month	Manager	Club	Player	Club
August	(Sweden) Jimmy Thelin	Aberdeen	(Scotland) Callum McGregor	Celtic
September	(Northern Ireland) Brendan Rodgers	Celtic	(Scotland) Lennon Miller	Motherwell
October	(Sweden) Jimmy Thelin	Aberdeen	(Scotland) Nicky Devlin	Aberdeen
November	(Northern Ireland) Brendan Rodgers	Celtic	(England) Sam Dalby	Dundee United
December	(Scotland) David Gray	Hibernian	(Scotland) Nicky Cadden	Hibernian
January	(England) Neil Critchley	Heart of Midlothian	(Morocco) Hamza Igamane	Rangers
February	(Scotland) David Gray	Hibernian	(Japan) Daizen Maeda	Celtic
March	(Scotland) David Gray	Hibernian	(Japan) Daizen Maeda	Celtic
April	(Sweden) Jimmy Thelin	Aberdeen	(Scotland) Simon Murray	Dundee

=== Annual awards ===
Award	Winner	Club
Scottish Premiership Player of the Year	(Japan) Daizen Maeda	Celtic
PFA Scotland Premiership Player of the Year	(Japan) Daizen Maeda	Celtic
PFA Scotland SPFL Young Player of the Year	(Scotland) Lennon Miller	Motherwell
PFA Scotland SPFL Manager of the Year	(Scotland) John McGlynn	Falkirk
PFA Scotland Goal of the Season	(Scotland) Jack Iredale	Hibernian
SFWA Player of the Year	(Japan) Daizen Maeda	Celtic

PFA Scotland Team of the Year
Goalkeeper	(Denmark) Kasper Schmeichel (Celtic)			
Defenders	(Canada) Alistair Johnston (Celtic)	(United States) Cameron Carter-Vickers (Celtic)	(Scotland) John Souttar (Rangers)	(Scotland) James Penrice (Heart of Midlothian)
Midfielders	(Belgium) Nicolas Raskin (Rangers)		(Scotland) Callum McGregor (Celtic)	(Japan) Reo Hatate (Celtic)
Forwards	(Germany) Nicolas Kühn (Celtic)		(Japan) Daizen Maeda (Celtic)	(England) Sam Dalby (Dundee United)

== Premiership play-offs ==
The quarter-final was contested by the teams placed third and fourth in the 2024–25 Scottish Championship, Ayr United and Partick Thistle. Partick Thistle advanced to the semi-final to face the team placed second in the Championship, Livingston. The final was contested by Livingston and the team placed eleventh in the Premiership, Ross County, with winners Livingston securing a place in the 2025–26 Scottish Premiership.

=== Qualified teams ===
Team	Rank
Ross County	1
Livingston	2
Ayr United	3
Partick Thistle	4

Quarter-final
3	Ayr United	1	0	1
4	Partick Thistle	0	2	2

Semi-final
2	Livingston	2	2	4
4	Partick Thistle	0	0	0

Final
1	Ross County	1	2	3
2	Livingston	1	4	5

=== Quarter-final ===
==== First leg ====
6 May 2025	Partick Thistle	0–1	Ayr United	Glasgow
19:45			Murphy 55'	Stadium: Firhill Stadium; Attendance: 5,250; Referee: David Dickinson

==== Second leg ====
9 May 2025	Ayr United	0–2 (1–2 agg.)	Partick Thistle	Ayr
19:45			Graham 6', 88'	Stadium: Somerset Park; Attendance: 5,308; Referee: Nick Walsh

=== Semi-final ===
==== First leg ====
13 May 2025	Partick Thistle	0–2	Livingston	Glasgow
19:45			Pittman 39'; Wilson 52'	Stadium: Firhill Stadium; Attendance: 5,470; Referee: Don Robertson

==== Second leg ====
16 May 2025	Livingston	2–0 (4–0 agg.)	Partick Thistle	Livingston
19:45	Brandon 40'; May 67'			Stadium: Almondvale Stadium; Attendance: 3,432; Referee: Kevin Clancy

=== Final ===
==== First leg ====
22 May 2025	Livingston	1–1	Ross County	Livingston
20:00	Wilson 45'		Hale 90' (pen.)	Stadium: Almondvale Stadium; Attendance: 2,643; Referee: John Beaton

==== Second leg ====
26 May 2025	Ross County	2–4 (3–5 agg.)	Livingston	Dingwall
20:00	Nisbet 7'; Hale 24'		Smith 39'; Wilson 57'; Muirhead 61'; Yengi 90+6'	Stadium: Victoria Park; Attendance: 4,138; Referee: Nick Walsh
