= 2025–26 Hamilton Academical F.C. season =

Hamilton Academical
2025–26 season
- Chairman: Jock Brown (until 4 November); Allan Currie (interim) (from 4 January)
- Manager: John Rankin (until 29 November); Darian MacKinnon (from 29 November)
- Stadium: Broadwood Stadium
- Scottish League One: Ninth place
- League one play-offs: Winners
- Scottish Cup: Third round
- League Cup: Group stage
- Challenge Cup: Second round
- Top goalscorer: League: Oli Shaw (18); All: Oli Shaw (26)
- Highest home attendance: 1,827 vs. Heart of Midlothian, League Cup, 15 July 2025
- Lowest home attendance: 208 vs. Edinburgh City, Challenge Cup, 27 August 2025
- Average home league attendance: 459
| Home colours | Away colours |

The 2025–26 season was Hamilton Academical's first season back in the third tier of Scottish football, following their relegation from the Scottish Championship at the end of the 2024–25 season. Hamilton also competed in the League Cup, Challenge Cup and the Scottish Cup.

== Summary ==
=== Off the field issues ===
On 17 April 2025, Hamilton were deducted 15 points and fined £9,000 for multiple breaches of SPFL rules. On 1 May, one day before the final round of Championship fixtures were scheduled to be played, the SPFL upheld their decision after the club had submitted an appeal, confirming Hamilton's relegation to League One.

On 25 July, Hamilton were issued with a season-long transfer embargo by the SPFL after failing to settle the club's tax obligations on three separate occasions. As a result the club were fined £7,500 with £5,000 suspended. It also left the club unable to sign new players as well as re-register players whose contracts had expired. Subsequently the club signed several players on amateur contracts in order to circumvent the embargo.

However on 22 October, Accies were deducted points and fined £22,000 after having been found in breach of several SPFL rules in relation to payments being made to players registered as amateurs or trialists. The club were deducted 5 points in League One and 1 point in the Challenge Cup league phase. Of the £22,000, £3,000 was suspended until the end of the 2026/27 season.

On 4 November, Jock Brown announced he would be stepping down from his role as Chairman for health reasons, leaving director of football, Gerry Strain, as the sole director left on the club's board.

On 11 November, the SFA released a statement which determined that Accies CEO and majority shareholder Serif Zengin, and Gerry Strain, were judged not to be "fit and proper" people to be involved in association football. This resulted in the pair being banned from running the day-to-day operations at the club.

Later that same day, it was revealed that Police Scotland were investigating alleged fraud at the club, dating back to May of that year.

On 16 December, the club were deducted a further 9 points for failing to maintain a bronze-level club license.

On 4 January 2026, the club announced that a takeover had been completed by Morley Sports Management Group who had acquired 97.5% controlling stake in the club from Seref Zengin. Rob Edwards, Neil Blankstone and Allan Currie were appointed to the clubs's board with Currie taking on the role of interim chairman.

On 12 February, Hamilton were deducted a further 6 points in relation to the late payment of staff and players in December 2025.

=== Relocation to Broadwood Stadium ===
Between 2022 and 2025, Hamilton shared their home stadium, New Douglas Park, with Clyde following Clyde's eviction from their home ground Broadwood Stadium. In May 2025 it was announced that due to a dispute with the owner of New Douglas Park, Hamilton would play their home fixtures at Broadwood until further notice. In April 2026, the club announced that they had reached an agreement to return to New Douglas Park for the 2026/27 season.

== Results and fixtures ==
Win Draw Loss Postponed

=== Pre-season and friendlies ===
| 5 July 2025 Friendly | Partick Thistle | 4–1 | Hamilton Academical | Glasgow |
| 14:00 | Trialist 22'; Chalmers 73'; Crawford 79'; Fitzpatrick | Report | 45' | Stadium: Petershill Park |

=== Scottish League One ===
| 2 August 2025 1 | Hamilton Academical | 2–0 | Montrose | Cumbernauld |
| 15:00 | Shaw 45+1'; Trialist 62' | Report | | Stadium: Broadwood Stadium; Attendance: 365; Referee: Sean Murdoch |

| 9 August 2025 2 | Queen of the South | 1–4 | Hamilton Academical | Dumfries |
| 15:00 | Lyon 46' | Report | Smith 28', 53'; Trialist 39'; Bradley 61' | Stadium: Palmerston Park; Attendance: 1,246; Referee: Greg Soutar |

| 16 August 2025 3 | Hamilton Academical | 1–2 | East Fife | Cumbernauld |
| 15:00 | Robinson 15' | Report | Jones 52', 53' | Stadium: Broadwood Stadium; Attendance: 482; Referee: Calum Scott |

| 23 August 2025 4 | Alloa Athletic | 1–0 | Hamilton Academical | Alloa |
| 15:00 | Devine 54' | Report | | Stadium: Recreation Park, Alloa; Attendance: 713; Referee: George Calder |

| 30 August 2025 5 | Hamilton Academical | 0–0 | Cove Rangers | Cumbernauld |
| 15:00 | | Report | | Stadium: Broadwood Stadium; Attendance: 250; Referee: Calum Scott |

| 13 September 2025 6 | Peterhead | 2–2 | Hamilton Academical | Peterhead |
| 15:00 | McGuffie 30'; Smith 62' | Report | Shaw 43'; McKinstry 89' | Stadium: Balmoor Stadium; Attendance: 639; Referee: Euan Anderson |

| 20 September 2025 7 | Kelty Hearts | 0–4 | Hamilton Academical | Kelty |
| 15:00 | Arnott (red card) 35' | Report | MacDonald 5'; Smith 12', 54'; Shaw 20' (pen.) | Stadium: New Central Park; Attendance: 457; Referee: Greg Soutar |

| 27 September 2025 8 | Hamilton Academical | 2–0 | Stenhousemuir | Cumbernauld |
| 15:00 | Shaw 25'; O'Hara 82' | Report | | Stadium: Broadwood Stadium; Attendance: 431; Referee: Connor Ashwood |

| 4 October 2025 9 | Hamilton Academical | 3–1 | Inverness CT | Cumbernauld |
| 15:00 | O'Hara 22'; MacDonald 64'; Shaw 90+2' | Report | Bavidge 63' | Stadium: Broadwood Stadium; Attendance: 384; Referee: Sean Murdoch |

| 18 October 2025 10 | Montrose | 0–4 | Hamilton Academical | Montrose |
| 15:00 | | Report | MacDonald 21'; Shaw 61'; Bradley 70'; Kilday 81' | Stadium: Links Park; Attendance: 578; Referee: Daniel Graves |

| 25 October 2025 11 | Hamilton Academical | 1–2 | Queen of the South | Cumbernauld |
| 15:00 | Smith 71' | Report | Stott 18'; Loughrey 67' (o.g.) | Stadium: Broadwood Stadium; Attendance: 446; Referee: Colin Steven |

| 1 November 2025 12 | East Fife | 1–1 | Hamilton Academical | Methil |
| 15:00 | Munro 74' | Report | Shaw 75' | Stadium: Bayview Stadium; Attendance: 847; Referee: Iain Snedden |

| 8 November 2025 13 | Hamilton Academical | 3–0 | Peterhead | Cumbernauld |
| 15:00 | MacDonald 21'; Shaw 41', 50' | Report | | Stadium: Broadwood Stadium; Attendance: 372; Referee: Alastair Grieve |

| 15 November 2025 14 | Cove Rangers | 2–1 | Hamilton Academical | Cove Bay |
| 15:00 | Eguaibor 38'; Megginson 43' | Report | Shaw 40' | Stadium: Balmoral Stadium; Attendance: 463; Referee: Graham Grainger |

| 22 November 2025 15 | Hamilton Academical | 3–1 | Kelty Hearts | Cumbernauld |
| 15:00 | Shaw 6', 53'; O'Hara 72' | Report | Johnston 25' | Stadium: Broadwood Stadium; Attendance: 410; Referee: Peter Stuart |

| 6 December 2025 16 | Stenhousemuir | 0–0 | Hamilton Academical | Stenhousemuir |
| 15:00 | | Report | | Stadium: Ochilview Park; Attendance: 549; Referee: Cameron Stirling |

| 13 December 2025 17 | Inverness CT | 4–0 | Hamilton Academical | Inverness |
| 15:00 | Robertson 3'; Zimba 41'; Bavidge 54'; Mckay 74' | Report | | Stadium: Caledonian Stadium; Attendance: 2,150; Referee: Grant Irvine |

| 20 December 2025 18 | Hamilton Academical | 1–0 | Alloa Athletic | Cumbernauld |
| 15:00 | Robinson 25' | Report | | Stadium: Broadwood Stadium; Attendance: 501; Referee: Sean Murdoch |

| 27 December 2025 19 | Queen of the South | 4–1 | Hamilton Academical | Dumfries |
| 15:00 | Douglas 12', 45', 52'; Scott 89' | Report | Smith 47' | Stadium: Palmerston Park; Attendance: 1,343; Referee: Connor Ashwood |

| 17 January 2026 20 | Peterhead | 2–3 | Hamilton Academical | Peterhead |
| 15:00 | Shanks 11'; McGinn 80' | Report | O'Hara 9'; Bradley 57'; Hendrie 90+3' | Stadium: Balmoor Stadium; Attendance: 560; Referee: Graham Grainger |

| 24 January 2026 21 | Hamilton Academical | 2–0 | Cove Rangers | Cumbernauld |
| 15:00 | Shaw 68'; MacDonald 83' | Report | | Stadium: Broadwood Stadium; Attendance: 696; Referee: Euan Anderson |

| 31 January 2026 22 | Kelty Hearts | 0–0 | Hamilton Academical | Kelty |
| 15:00 | | Report | | Stadium: New Central Park; Attendance: 449; Referee: Josh Hay |

| 14 February 2026 23 | Hamilton Academical | 0–1 | Inverness CT | Cumbernauld |
| 17:30 | | Report | Bavidge 68' | Stadium: Broadwood Stadium; Attendance: 480; Referee: Cameron Stirling |

| 17 February 2026 24 | Hamilton Academical | 1–0 | East Fife | Cumbernauld |
| 19:45 | Shaw 14' | Report | | Stadium: Broadwood Stadium; Attendance: 599; Referee: Josh Hay |

| 21 February 2026 25 | Alloa Athletic | 3–0 | Hamilton Academical | Alloa |
| 15:00 | Burnside 58'; Donnelly 63'; Gallagher 88' | Report | | Stadium: Recreation Park; Attendance: 654; Referee: Peter Stuart |

| 28 February 2026 26 | Hamilton Academical | 1–1 | Montrose | Cumbernauld |
| 15:00 | Kilday 63' | Report | Freeman 42' | Stadium: Broadwood Stadium; Attendance: 384; Referee: Euan Anderson |

| 3 March 2026 27 | Hamilton Academical | 0–1 | Stenhousemuir | Cumbernauld |
| 19:45 | Crookston (red card) 90+4' | Report | Whyte 60' | Stadium: Broadwood Stadium; Attendance: 606; Referee: Alastair Grieve |

| 7 March 2026 28 | East Fife | 0–3 | Hamilton Academical | Methil |
| 15:00 | | Report | O'Hara 32'; McKinstry 60'; Shaw 83' | Stadium: Bayview Stadium; Attendance: 698; Referee: Iain Snedden |

| 14 March 2026 29 | Hamilton Academical | 1–3 | Queen of the South | Cumbernauld |
| 15:00 | Shaw 22' | Report | Clark 29', 77'; Lyon 52' | Stadium: Broadwood Stadium; Attendance: 636; Referee: George Calder |

| 21 March 2026 30 | Cove Rangers | 2–2 | Hamilton Academical | Cove Bay |
| 15:00 | Teasdale 66'; Maguire 90+1' | Report | Darge 17' (o.g.); Kilday 39' | Stadium: Balmoral Stadium; Attendance: 410; Referee: Graham Grainger |

| 28 March 2026 31 | Hamilton Academical | 1–2 | Kelty Hearts | Cumbernauld |
| 15:00 | Shaw 45+1' | Report | Pettifer 34'; Cunningham 48' | Stadium: Broadwood Stadium; Attendance: 388; Referee: Grant Irvine |

| 4 April 2026 32 | Stenhousemuir | 3–0 | Hamilton Academical | Stenhousemuir |
| 15:00 | Ritchie-Hosler 26'; Taylor 30'; Buchanan 54' | Report | | Stadium: Ochilview Park; Attendance: 648; Referee: Peter Stuart |

| 11 April 2026 33 | Hamilton Academical | 1–0 | Alloa Athletic | Cumbernauld |
| 15:00 | Shaw 56' | Report | | Stadium: Broadwood Stadium; Attendance: 575; Referee: George Calder |

| 18 April 2026 34 | Montrose | 0–2 | Hamilton Academical | Montrose |
| 15:00 | | Report | MacDonald 6'; Hutton 81' | Stadium: Links Park; Attendance: 577; Referee: Iain Snedden |

| 25 April 2026 35 | Hamilton Academical | 3–1 | Peterhead | Cumbernauld |
| 15:00 | Shaw 6'; O'Hara 56'; Simpson 86' | Report | Brown 90+2' | Stadium: Broadwood Stadium; Attendance: 583; Referee: Lewis Hogarth |

| 2 May 2026 36 | Inverness CT | 2–1 | Hamilton Academical | Inverness |
| 15:00 | Devine 3'; McKay 26' | Report | O'Hara 85' | Stadium: Caledonian Stadium; Attendance: 5,029; Referee: Chris Graham |

=== League one play-offs ===
| 5 May 2026 Semi–finals 1st leg | Forfar Athletic | 1–3 | Hamilton Academical | Forfar |
| 19:45 | Shepherd 90+3' | Report | MacDonald 44'; Shaw 71', 76' | Stadium: Station Park; Attendance: 972; Referee: Colin Steven |

| 9 May 2026 Semi–finals 2nd leg | Hamilton Academical | 2–1 (5–2 agg.) | Forfar Athletic | Cumbernauld |
| 15:00 | Shaw 63', 74' | Report | Sutherland 80' (pen.) | Stadium: Broadwood Stadium; Attendance: 718; Referee: Sean Murdoch |

| 12 May 2026 Final 1st leg | Clyde | 1–1 | Hamilton Academical | Hamilton |
| 19:45 | McGinlay 38' | Report | McKinstry 10' | Stadium: New Douglas Park; Attendance: 1,502; Referee: Ross Hardie |

| 15 May 2026 Final 2nd leg | Hamilton Academical | 4–3 (5–4 agg.) | Clyde | Cumbernauld |
| 19:45 | Gallacher 18', 65'; MacDonald 21', 52' | Report | Smutek 16' (o.g.); Connell 45+2'; Dunachie 59' | Stadium: Broadwood Stadium; Attendance: 1,768; Referee: Lloyd Wilson |

=== Scottish League Cup ===
==== Group stage ====
| 12 July 2025 Group Stage | Stirling Albion | 0–2 | Hamilton Academical | Stirling |
| 15:00 | | Report | Smith 52'; MacDonald 59' | Stadium: Forthbank Stadium; Attendance: 648; Referee: Peter Stuart |

| 15 July 2025 Group Stage | Hamilton Academical | 0–4 | Heart of Midlothian | Cumbernauld |
| 19:45 | | Report | Findlay 6'; Kabangu 45+1'; Wilson 69'; Braga 83' | Stadium: Broadwood Stadium; Attendance: 1,827; Referee: Ross Hardie |

| 22 July 2025 Group Stage | Dunfermline Athletic | 2–1 | Hamilton Academical | Dunfermline |
| 19:45 | A.Tod 39'; Kilday 70' (o.g.) | Report | Shaw 69' | Stadium: East End Park; Attendance: 2,582; Referee: Daniel Graves |

| 26 July 2025 Group Stage | Hamilton Academical | 0–1 | Dumbarton | Cumbernauld |
| 15:00 | | Report | Roy 45' | Stadium: Broadwood Stadium; Attendance: 290; Referee: Joel Kennedy |

=== Scottish Challenge Cup ===
==== League phase ====
| 13 August 2025 1 | Hamilton Academical | 0–0 | Motherwell B | Cumbernauld |
| 19:45 | | Report | | Stadium: Broadwood Stadium; Attendance: 215; Referee: Connor Ashwood |

| 27 August 2025 2 | Hamilton Academical | 2–3 | Edinburgh City | Cumbernauld |
| 19:45 | McKinstry 19'; O'Hara 52'; Shiels (red card) 81' | Report | Jarvis 29'; Lawson 73'; Duncan 75' | Stadium: Broadwood Stadium; Attendance: 208; Referee: Cameron Stirling |

| 6 September 2025 3 | East Kilbride | 2–4 | Hamilton Academical | East Kilbride |
| 15:00 | Breen (red card) 30'; Robertson 53' (pen.), 82' | Report | Shaw 40'; O'Hara 45+1', 66'; McKinstry 87' | Stadium: K-Park Training Academy; Attendance: 602; Referee: Dan McFarlane |

| 24 September 2025 4 | Hamilton Academical | 3–1 | St Mirren B | Cumbernauld |
| 19:45 | O'Hara 17'; Shaw 34', 35' | Report | Lavery 63' | Stadium: Broadwood Stadium; Attendance: 325; Referee: Josh Hay |

| 11 October 2025 5 | Hamilton Academical | 1–2 | Annan Athletic | Cumbernauld |
| 15:00 | Morgan 47' | Report | Dixon 81'; Hooper 90+3' | Stadium: Broadwood Stadium; Attendance: 250; Referee: Iain Snedden |

| 11 November 2025 6 | Hamilton Academical | 3–0 | Rangers B | Cumbernauld |
| 19:45 | O'Hara 59'; Bradley 77'; Hynd 79' (o.g.) | Report | | Stadium: Broadwood Stadium; Attendance: 268; Referee: Gavin Duncan |

==== Knockout phase ====
| 9 December 2025 Second round | Raith Rovers | 5–2 | Hamilton Academical | Kirkcaldy |
| 19:45 | O'Connor 5'; Brown 51'; Rowe 58', 81', 87' | Report | Cameron 40', 79' | Stadium: Stark's Park; Attendance: 596; Referee: Graham Grainger |

=== Scottish Cup ===
| 29 November 2025 Third round | Airdrieonians | 4–0 | Hamilton Academical | Airdrie |
| 15:00 | McGrattan 47', 72'; Mochrie 55'; Henderson 58' (pen.) | Report | | Stadium: Excelsior Stadium; Attendance: 345; Referee: Duncan Nicolson |

== Squad statistics ==
=== Appearances ===
As of 15 May 2026

| No. | Pos | Nat | Player | Total | | League One + playoffs | | League Cup | | Challenge Cup | | Scottish Cup | |
| No. | Pos | Nat | Player | Apps | Goals | Apps | Goals | Apps | Goals | Apps | Goals | Apps | Goals |
|---|---|---|---|---|---|---|---|---|---|---|---|---|---|
| 2 | DF | (Scotland) SCO | Zander Hutton | 36 | 1 | 32+1 | 1 | 0 | 0 | 2 | 0 | 1 | 0 |
| 4 | DF | (Scotland) SCO | Lee Kilday | 43 | 2 | 38 | 2 | 2 | 0 | 2 | 0 | 1 | 0 |
| 5 | DF | (Wales) WAL | Kai Smutek | 20 | 0 | 20 | 0 | 0 | 0 | 0 | 0 | 0 | 0 |
| 7 | FW | (Scotland) SCO | Kevin O'Hara | 49 | 11 | 40 | 7 | 3+1 | 0 | 3+1 | 4 | 1 | 0 |
| 9 | FW | (Scotland) SCO | Oli Shaw | 46 | 26 | 34+3 | 22 | 4 | 1 | 3+1 | 3 | 1 | 0 |
| 10 | MF | (Scotland) SCO | Steven Bradley | 29 | 4 | 18+5 | 3 | 3+1 | 0 | 0+1 | 1 | 1 | 0 |
| 12 | MF | (Scotland) SCO | Kai Black | 1 | 0 | 0 | 0 | 0 | 0 | 0+1 | 0 | 0 | 0 |
| 14 | MF | (Scotland) SCO | Barry Maguire | 7 | 0 | 1+2 | 0 | 2 | 0 | 2 | 0 | 0 | 0 |
| 15 | DF | (Scotland) SCO | Cian Newbury | 25 | 0 | 14+6 | 0 | 0 | 0 | 3+2 | 0 | 0 | 0 |
| 16 | DF | (Scotland) SCO | Kyle MacDonald | 47 | 10 | 39 | 9 | 3 | 1 | 3+1 | 0 | 1 | 0 |
| 18 | FW | (Scotland) SCO | Liam Morgan | 21 | 1 | 0+13 | 0 | 1+2 | 0 | 4 | 1 | 0+1 | 0 |
| 19 | MF | (Scotland) SCO | Ewan Simpson | 25 | 1 | 17+6 | 1 | 0 | 0 | 2 | 0 | 0 | 0 |
| 20 | MF | (Scotland) SCO | Campbell Forrest | 9 | 0 | 3+6 | 0 | 0 | 0 | 0 | 0 | 0 | 0 |
| 21 | DF | (Scotland) SCO | Gregor Crookston | 13 | 0 | 4+9 | 0 | 0 | 0 | 0 | 0 | 0 | 0 |
| 27 | MF | (Scotland) SCO | Stuart McKinstry | 49 | 5 | 25+14 | 3 | 1+2 | 0 | 5+1 | 2 | 0+1 | 0 |
| 28 | FW | (Scotland) SCO | Ben Black | 8 | 0 | 2+6 | 0 | 0 | 0 | 0 | 0 | 0 | 0 |
| 30 | DF | (Scotland) SCO | Tony Gallacher | 39 | 2 | 25+6 | 2 | 2+1 | 0 | 5 | 0 | 0 | 0 |
| 32 | DF | (Scotland) SCO | Aaron Eadie | 15 | 0 | 0+4 | 0 | 1+2 | 0 | 5+2 | 0 | 0+1 | 0 |
| 33 | DF | (Scotland) SCO | Stephen Hendrie | 40 | 1 | 25+8 | 1 | 3+1 | 0 | 1+1 | 0 | 1 | 0 |
| 34 | MF | (Scotland) SCO | Marcus Syme | 5 | 0 | 0+4 | 0 | 0 | 0 | 1 | 0 | 0 | 0 |
| 40 | MF | (Scotland) SCO | Darian MacKinnon | 4 | 0 | 0+2 | 0 | 0 | 0 | 2 | 0 | 0 | 0 |
| 41 | GK | (Scotland) SCO | Josh Lane | 20 | 0 | 20 | 0 | 0 | 0 | 0 | 0 | 0 | 0 |
| 42 | MF | (Scotland) SCO | Lennon Lyons | 3 | 0 | 0 | 0 | 0 | 0 | 2+1 | 0 | 0 | 0 |
| 43 | MF | (Scotland) SCO | Ben Reilly | 2 | 0 | 0 | 0 | 0 | 0 | 2 | 0 | 0 | 0 |
| 44 | MF | (Scotland) SCO | Kayden Aitken | 6 | 0 | 0+1 | 0 | 0+1 | 0 | 3+1 | 0 | 0 | 0 |
| 45 | MF | (Scotland) SCO | Finlay Cameron | 8 | 2 | 0+5 | 0 | 0 | 0 | 1+2 | 2 | 0 | 0 |
| 47 | MF | (Scotland) SCO | Josh Carson | 8 | 0 | 0 | 0 | 1+2 | 0 | 4+1 | 0 | 0 | 0 |
| 48 | MF | (Scotland) SCO | Jamie Herd | 4 | 0 | 0 | 0 | 0 | 0 | 2+2 | 0 | 0 | 0 |
| 49 | MF | (Scotland) SCO | Dominic Shiels | 13 | 0 | 0+8 | 0 | 0 | 0 | 3+2 | 0 | 0 | 0 |
| 51 | GK | (Scotland) SCO | Neil Stafford | 0 | 0 | 0 | 0 | 0 | 0 | 0 | 0 | 0 | 0 |
| 58 | MF | (Scotland) SCO | Cole Stirling | 2 | 0 | 0+1 | 0 | 0 | 0 | 0+1 | 0 | 0 | 0 |
| | MF | (Scotland) SCO | Kyle Bannatyne | 1 | 0 | 0 | 0 | 0 | 0 | 0+1 | 0 | 0 | 0 |
Players who left the club during the 2025–26 season
| 1 | GK | (England) ENG | Dean Lyness | 1 | 0 | 0 | 0 | 1 | 0 | 0 | 0 | 0 | 0 |
| 3 | DF | (England) ENG | Fergus Owens | 0 | 0 | 0 | 0 | 0 | 0 | 0 | 0 | 0 | 0 |
| 6 | DF | (Australia) AUS | Dylan McGowan | 1 | 0 | 0 | 0 | 1 | 0 | 0 | 0 | 0 | 0 |
| 8 | MF | (Scotland) SCO | Connor Smith | 28 | 7 | 19 | 6 | 4 | 1 | 2+2 | 0 | 1 | 0 |
| 11 | MF | (Scotland) SCO | Bobby McLuckie | 15 | 0 | 3+11 | 0 | 0 | 0 | 0 | 0 | 0+1 | 0 |
| 12 | DF | (Scotland) SCO | Luke Rathie | 6 | 0 | 2+1 | 0 | 0 | 0 | 3 | 0 | 0 | 0 |
| 13 | FW | (Nigeria) NGA | Idris Munir | 1 | 0 | 0+1 | 0 | 0 | 0 | 0 | 0 | 0 | 0 |
| 17 | MF | (Scotland) SCO | Scott Robinson | 25 | 2 | 17 | 2 | 3+1 | 0 | 1+2 | 0 | 1 | 0 |
| 20 | MF | (Scotland) SCO | Ben Williamson | 0 | 0 | 0 | 0 | 0 | 0 | 0 | 0 | 0 | 0 |
| 22 | DF | (Canada) CAN | Cale Loughrey | 24 | 0 | 19 | 0 | 0 | 0 | 3+1 | 0 | 1 | 0 |
| 23 | MF | (England) ENG | Mikey Stone | 5 | 0 | 0+3 | 0 | 0 | 0 | 2 | 0 | 0 | 0 |
| 31 | GK | (Scotland) SCO | Jamie Smith | 24 | 0 | 19 | 0 | 3 | 0 | 1 | 0 | 1 | 0 |
| 52 | GK | (Scotland) SCO | Michael Marks | 4 | 0 | 0 | 0 | 0 | 0 | 4 | 0 | 0 | 0 |

== Team statistics ==
=== League table ===
| Pos | Team | Pld | W | D | L | GF | GA | GD | Pts | Promotion, qualification or relegation |
|---|---|---|---|---|---|---|---|---|---|---|
| 6 | Montrose | 36 | 11 | 9 | 16 | 48 | 67 | −19 | 42 | |
| 7 | Cove Rangers | 36 | 9 | 11 | 16 | 41 | 44 | −3 | 38 | |
| 8 | East Fife | 36 | 9 | 9 | 18 | 34 | 61 | −27 | 36 | |
| 9 | Hamilton Academical (O) | 36 | 16 | 7 | 13 | 54 | 42 | +12 | 34 (Note: Hamilton Academical were deducted six points for breaching SPFL rules regarding amateur players, a further nine points for failing to hold at least a bronze level licence and then six more points for failing to pay players' wages on time.) | Qualification for the League One play-offs |
| 10 | Kelty Hearts (R) | 36 | 6 | 11 | 19 | 33 | 62 | −29 | 29 | Relegation to League Two |

Rules for classification: 1) Points; 2) Goal difference; 3) Goals scored; 4) Head-to-head points; 5) Head-to-head goal difference; 6) Play-off (only for deciding promotion, play-off participation and relegation).
(O) Play-off winners; (R) Relegated

=== League Cup table ===
| Pos | Team | Pld | W | PW | PL | L | GF | GA | GD | Pts | Qualification | HOM | DNF | DUM | HAM | STI |
|---|---|---|---|---|---|---|---|---|---|---|---|---|---|---|---|---|
| 1 | Heart of Midlothian | 4 | 4 | 0 | 0 | 0 | 16 | 1 | +15 | 12 | Qualification for the second round | — | 4–1 | 4–0 | — | — |
| 2 | Dunfermline Athletic | 4 | 3 | 0 | 0 | 1 | 9 | 5 | +4 | 9 | | — | — | — | 2–1 | 2–0 |
| 3 | Dumbarton | 4 | 2 | 0 | 0 | 2 | 2 | 8 | −6 | 6 | | — | 0–4 | — | — | 1–0 |
| 4 | Hamilton Academical | 4 | 1 | 0 | 0 | 3 | 3 | 7 | −4 | 3 | | 0–4 | — | 0–1 | — | — |
| 5 | Stirling Albion | 4 | 0 | 0 | 0 | 4 | 0 | 9 | −9 | 0 | | 0–4 | — | — | 0–2 | — |

Rules for classification: 1) goal difference, 2) goals scored, 3) away goals scored, 4) matches won, 5) away matches won, 6) drawing of lots.

=== Challenge Cup table ===
| Pos | Team | Pld | W | D | L | GF | GA | GD | Pts | Qualification |
|---|---|---|---|---|---|---|---|---|---|---|
| 15 | Clyde | 6 | 3 | 1 | 2 | 14 | 12 | +2 | 10 | Advance to Second round |
| 16 | Queen of the South | 6 | 3 | 1 | 2 | 12 | 10 | +2 | 10 | Advance to Second round |
| 17 | Hamilton Academical | 6 | 3 | 1 | 2 | 13 | 8 | +5 | 9 (Note: Hamilton Academical were deducted 1 point for breaching SPFL rules regarding amateur players.) | Advance to Second round |
| 18 | Stirling Albion | 6 | 3 | 0 | 3 | 9 | 9 | 0 | 9 | Advance to Second round |
| 19 | Cove Rangers | 6 | 2 | 2 | 2 | 9 | 6 | +3 | 8 | Advance to Second round |

Source: SPFL
Rules for classification: 1) Points; 2) Goal difference; 3) Goals scored; 4) Head-to-to head points; 5) Head-to-head goal difference; 6) Play-off (only for deciding qualification).

== Transfers ==
=== Players in ===
| Player | From | Fee |
|---|---|---|
| (Nigeria) Idris Munir | (Scotland) Drumchapel United | Free |
| (England) Mikey Stone | (England) Huddersfield Town | Free |
| (Canada) Cale Loughrey | (Romania) Corvinul Hunedoara | Free |

=== Players out ===
| Player | To | Fee |
|---|---|---|
| (Republic of Ireland) Sean McGinty | (Scotland) Airdrieonians | Free |
| (Bulgaria) Nikolay Todorov | (Scotland) Arbroath | Free |
| (Scotland) Reghan Tumilty | (Scotland) St Johnstone | Free |
| (England) Charlie Albinson | (Scotland) Annan Athletic | Free |
| (Scotland) Euan Henderson | (Scotland) Airdrieonians | Free |
| (Scotland) Connor Murray | (Northern Ireland) Coleraine | Free |
| (Scotland) Jamie Barjonas | (Scotland) Airdrieonians | Free |
| (Scotland) Gravine Kalala | (Scotland) Annan Athletic | Free |
| (Scotland) Lewis Latona | (Scotland) Livingston | Free |
| (Scotland) Jackson Longridge | (Scotland) Greenock Morton | Free |
| (Scotland) Chris Neeson | (Scotland) Albion Rovers | Free |
| (Republic of Ireland) Daire O'Connor | (Northern Ireland) Ballymena United | Undisclosed |
| (Scotland) Arran Preston | (Scotland) Clydebank | Free |
| (Scotland) Kerr Reynolds | (England) Hull City | Undisclosed |
| (England) Mikey Stone | (England) Altrincham | Free |
| (Scotland) Ben Williamson | (Scotland) East Kilbride | Free |
| (Scotland) Scott Robinson | (Scotland) Arbroath | Free |
| (Canada) Cale Loughrey | (Scotland) Partick Thistle | Free |
| (Scotland) Connor Smith | (England) Scunthorpe United | Undisclosed |
| (Scotland) Jamie Smith | (Scotland) Livingston | Free |
| (Scotland) Fergus Owens | (Scotland) Greenock Morton | Free |

=== Loans in ===
| Player | From | Fee |
|---|---|---|
| (Scotland) Ewan Simpson | (England) Aston Villa | Loan |
| (Scotland) Bobby McLuckie | (Scotland) Heart of Midlothian | Loan |
| (Scotland) Zander Hutton | (Scotland) Rangers | Loan |
| (Wales) Kai Smutek | (Scotland) Heart of Midlothian | Loan |
| (Scotland) Gregor Crookston | (Scotland) Heart of Midlothian | Loan |
| (Scotland) Campbell Forrest | (Scotland) Motherwell | Loan |

=== Loans out ===
| Player | To | Fee |
|---|---|---|
| (Scotland) Josh Lane | (Scotland) Stranraer | Loan |
| (Scotland) Neil Stafford | (Scotland) Forfar Athletic | Loan |
| (Scotland) Michael Marks | (Scotland) Thorniewood United | Loan |
