= 2026–27 Hamilton Academical F.C. season =

Hamilton Academical
2026–27 season
- Chairman: Allan Currie
- Manager: Darian MacKinnon
- Stadium: New Douglas Park
- Scottish Cup: Third round
- League Cup: Group Stage
- Challenge Cup: Third round
- Top goalscorer: League: Andy Ryan (8); All: Andy Ryan (10)
| Home colours | Away colours |

The 2026–27 season is Hamilton Academical's second season back in the third tier of Scottish football, following their relegation from the Scottish Championship at the end of the 2024–25 season. Hamilton will also compete in the League Cup, Challenge Cup and the Scottish Cup.

== Summary ==
In April 2026, the club announced that they had reached an agreement to return to New Douglas Park for the 2026/27 season.

== Results and fixtures ==
Win Draw Loss Postponed

=== Pre-season and friendlies ===
| 30 June 2026 | Linlithgow Rose | 2–2 | Hamilton Academical | Linlithgow |
| 15:00 | Maguire 78'; Rae 90+3' | Report | Trialist 26'; Blues 31' | Stadium: Prestonfield |

| 4 July 2026 | Haverfordwest County | 0–4 | Hamilton Academical | Haverfordwest |
| 15:00 | | Report | Thomas 39', 78'; Blues 42'; Macdonald 78' | Stadium: Bridge Meadow Stadium |

=== Scottish League One ===
| 1 August 2026 1 | Montrose | 0–5 | Hamilton Academical | Montrose |
| 15:00 | | Report | McGinty 14' (o.g.); McKinstry 23', 79'; Bannigan 68'; Hendrie 70' | Stadium: Links Park; Attendance: 606; Referee: Abbie Hendry |

| 8 August 2026 2 | Hamilton Academical | 1–0 | Alloa Athletic | Hamilton |
| 15:00 | Blues 27' | Report | | Stadium: New Douglas Park; Attendance: 803; Referee: Peter Stuart |

| 15 August 2026 3 | Hamilton Academical | 4–0 | Airdrieonians | Hamilton |
| 15:00 | MacDonald 13', 49', 90' (pen.); Smutek 81' | Report | | Stadium: New Douglas Park; Attendance: 1,048; Referee: Sean Murdoch |

| 22 August 2026 4 | East Fife | 0–0 | Hamilton Academical | Methil |
| 15:00 | | Report | | Stadium: Bayview Stadium; Attendance: 811; Referee: Joel Kennedy |

| 29 August 2026 5 | Hamilton Academical | 1–0 | Cove Rangers | Hamilton |
| 15:00 | Ryan 16' | Report | | Stadium: New Douglas Park; Attendance: 812; Referee: Josh Hay |

| 5 September 2026 6 | East Kilbride | 0–1 | Hamilton Academical | East Kilbride |
| 15:00 | | Report | Ryan 30' | Stadium: K-Park Training Academy; Attendance: 728; Referee: Colin Steven |

| 19 September 2026 7 | Hamilton Academical | 4–1 | Queen of the South | Hamilton |
| 15:00 | Ryan 23', 34', 41'; Gallacher 69' | Report | Smith 12' | Stadium: New Douglas Park; Attendance: 850; Referee: Abbie Hendry |

| 3 October 2026 8 | Hamilton Academical | 2–1 | Peterhead | Hamilton |
| 15:00 | Gallacher 52'; Ryan 72' | Report | Yule 63' | Stadium: New Douglas Park; Attendance: 537; Referee: Gary Hanvidge |

| 10 October 2026 9 | Alloa Athletic | 0–3 | Hamilton Academical | Alloa |
| 15:00 | | Report | Ryan 20'; McKinstry 28'; Bradley 41' | Stadium: Recreation Park; Attendance: 627; Referee: Jordan Curran |

| 17 October 2026 10 | Airdrieonians | 1–2 | Hamilton Academical | Airdrie |
| 15:00 | Gentles 47' | Report | Thomas 45'; Crookston 81' | Stadium: Excelsior Stadium; Attendance: 1,860; Referee: Cameron Stirling |

| 24 October 2026 11 | Hamilton Academical | 2–1 | East Fife | Hamilton |
| 15:00 | Blues 37'; Orsi 63' | Report | McLeod 77' | Stadium: New Douglas Park; Attendance: 570; Referee: Greg Soutar |

| 27 October 2026 12 | Ross County | 1–1 | Hamilton Academical | Dingwall |
| 19:45 | Smith 31' | Report | McKinstry 38' | Stadium: Victoria Park; Attendance: 2,767; Referee: Jamie Wilkie |

| 31 October 2026 13 | Hamilton Academical | 1–1 | Montrose | Hamilton |
| 15:00 | Blues 45+2' | Report | Freeman 82' | Stadium: New Douglas Park; Attendance: 597; Referee: Iain Snedden |

| 7 November 2026 14 | Cove Rangers | 4–0 | Hamilton Academical | Cove Bay |
| 15:00 | Oppong 31', 60', 78'; Teasdale 84' | Report | | Stadium: Balmoral Stadium; Attendance: 280; Referee: Daniel Graves |

| 14 November 2026 15 | Hamilton Academical | 1–2 | Ross County | Hamilton |
| 17:30 | Ryan 30' | Report | Graham 25' (pen.); Phillips 77' | Stadium: New Douglas Park; Attendance: 1,216; Referee: Alastair Grieve |

| 21 November 2026 16 | Queen of the South | 1–3 | Hamilton Academical | Dumfries |
| 15:00 | Young 80' | Report | Morgan 21'; MacDonald 32'; Crawford 53' | Stadium: Palmerston Park; Attendance: 739; Referee: Daniel Graves |

=== Scottish League Cup ===
==== Group Stage ====
| 11 July 2026 1 | Peterhead | 0–1 | Hamilton Academical | Peterhead |
| 15:00 | | Report | Newbury 33' | Stadium: Balmoor Stadium; Attendance: 454; Referee: Jordan Curran |

| 18 July 2026 2 | Hamilton Academical | 1–1 (5–4 p) | Raith Rovers | Hamilton |
| 15:00 | Blues 32' | Report | Vaughan 26' (pen.) | Stadium: New Douglas Park; Attendance: 1,100; Referee: Chris Graham |
| | Penalties |
| | Hendrie (penalty scored); Thomas (penalty scored); Trialist (penalty scored); MacDonald (penalty scored); Bannigan (penalty scored) | | (penalty scored) Vaughan; (penalty scored) McMullan; (penalty scored) Robertson; (penalty scored) Millen; (penalty missed) Gibson |

| 21 July 2026 3 | Kilmarnock | 1–0 | Hamilton Academical | Auchinleck |
| 19:45 | Kiltie 60' | Report | | Stadium: Beechwood Park; Attendance: 1,343; Referee: Jamie Wilkie |

| 25 July 2026 4 | Hamilton Academical | 5–0 | Elgin City | Hamilton |
| 15:00 | Bannigan 23', 25' (pen.); Crookston 67'; Blues 81'; Ryan 84' | Report | | Stadium: New Douglas Park; Attendance: 421; Referee: Josh Hay |

=== Scottish Challenge Cup ===
==== League Phase ====
| 12 August 2026 1 | Hamilton Academical | 1–3 | Celtic B | Hamilton |
| 20:00 | McKay 72' | Report | Clearie 43'; Dargie 75'; Hatton 78' | Stadium: New Douglas Park; Attendance: 306; Referee: Mark Daly |

| 25 August 2026 2 | Hamilton Academical | 0–1 | Edinburgh City | Hamilton |
| 19:45 | | Report | Leitch 21' | Stadium: New Douglas Park; Referee: Daniel Graves |

| 8 September 2026 3 | The Spartans | 0–4 | Hamilton Academical | Edinburgh |
| 19:45 | | Report | Welsh 3' (o.g.); Thomas 47'; MacDonald 63'; Ryan 65' | Stadium: Ainslie Park; Attendance: 223; Referee: Alastair Grieve |

| 23 September 2026 4 | Hamilton Academical | 1–0 | Cowdenbeath | Hamilton |
| 19:45 | Blues 71' | Report | | Stadium: New Douglas Park; Attendance: 153; Referee: Jamie Wilkie |

| 26 September 2026 5 | Hamilton Academical | 3–0 | Kilmarnock B | Hamilton |
| 15:00 | MacDonald 20'; Thomas 31'; Bradley 78' | Report | | Stadium: New Douglas Park; Attendance: 234; Referee: Grant Irvine |

| 13 October 2026 6 | Gala Fairydean Rovers | 0–2 | Hamilton Academical | Galashiels |
| 19:45 | | Report | Shiels 19'; Thomas 68' | Stadium: Netherdale; Attendance: 259; Referee: Ross Donaldson |

==== Knockout phase ====
| 3 November 2026 Second round | Hamilton Academical | 1–1 (5–3 p) | Raith Rovers | Hamilton |
| 19:45 | Shiels 12' | Report | Tiffoney 45' | Stadium: New Douglas Park; Attendance: 360; Referee: Sean Murdoch |

| November 2026 Third round | Hamilton Academical | v | Cove Rangers | Hamilton |
| 19:45 | | | | Stadium: New Douglas Park |

=== Scottish Cup ===
| 28 November 2026 Third round | Montrose | v | Hamilton Academical | Montrose |
| 15:00 | | | | Stadium: Links Park |

== Squad statistics ==
=== Appearances ===
As of 21 November 2026

| No. | Pos | Nat | Player | Total | | League One | | League Cup | | Challenge Cup | | Scottish Cup | |
| No. | Pos | Nat | Player | Apps | Goals | Apps | Goals | Apps | Goals | Apps | Goals | Apps | Goals |
|---|---|---|---|---|---|---|---|---|---|---|---|---|---|
| 1 | GK | (England) ENG | Dean Lyness | 22 | 0 | 16 | 0 | 4 | 0 | 2 | 0 | 0 | 0 |
| 2 | DF | (Scotland) SCO | Aaron Comrie | 23 | 0 | 16 | 0 | 3 | 0 | 2+2 | 0 | 0 | 0 |
| 3 | DF | (Scotland) SCO | Tony Gallacher | 23 | 1 | 16 | 1 | 4 | 0 | 2+1 | 0 | 0 | 0 |
| 4 | DF | (Scotland) SCO | Lee Kilday | 0 | 0 | 0 | 0 | 0 | 0 | 0 | 0 | 0 | 0 |
| 5 | DF | (Scotland) SCO | Fergus Owens | 13 | 0 | 6+2 | 0 | 0 | 0 | 4+1 | 0 | 0 | 0 |
| 6 | MF | (Scotland) SCO | Cameron Blues | 23 | 6 | 15 | 3 | 3+1 | 2 | 3+1 | 1 | 0 | 0 |
| 7 | FW | (Scotland) SCO | Dom Thomas | 27 | 4 | 14+2 | 1 | 4 | 0 | 5+2 | 3 | 0 | 0 |
| 8 | DF | (Scotland) SCO | Kyle MacDonald | 26 | 6 | 16 | 4 | 3+1 | 0 | 5+1 | 2 | 0 | 0 |
| 9 | FW | (Scotland) SCO | Taylor Sutherland | 2 | 0 | 0+1 | 0 | 0 | 0 | 1 | 0 | 0 | 0 |
| 10 | MF | (Scotland) SCO | Steven Bradley | 12 | 2 | 2+6 | 1 | 0+1 | 0 | 2+1 | 1 | 0 | 0 |
| 11 | FW | (Scotland) SCO | Kalvin Orsi | 15 | 2 | 2+9 | 2 | 3 | 0 | 1 | 0 | 0 | 0 |
| 12 | GK | (Scotland) SCO | Josh Lane | 4 | 0 | 0 | 0 | 0 | 0 | 4 | 0 | 0 | 0 |
| 14 | FW | (Scotland) SCO | Aiden McGinley | 5 | 0 | 0+2 | 0 | 0 | 0 | 2+1 | 0 | 0 | 0 |
| 15 | DF | (Scotland) SCO | Cian Newbury | 7 | 1 | 3 | 0 | 3 | 1 | 0+1 | 0 | 0 | 0 |
| 16 | DF | (Wales) WAL | Kai Smutek | 22 | 1 | 10+2 | 1 | 3 | 0 | 7 | 0 | 0 | 0 |
| 17 | MF | (Scotland) SCO | Stuart Bannigan | 24 | 3 | 15+1 | 1 | 2+2 | 2 | 2+2 | 0 | 0 | 0 |
| 18 | FW | (Scotland) SCO | Liam Morgan | 8 | 1 | 1+2 | 1 | 0 | 0 | 3+2 | 0 | 0 | 0 |
| 20 | DF | (Australia) AUS | Dylan McGowan | 2 | 0 | 0 | 0 | 0 | 0 | 2 | 0 | 0 | 0 |
| 21 | DF | (Scotland) SCO | Gregor Crookston | 25 | 2 | 2+12 | 1 | 1+3 | 1 | 7 | 0 | 0 | 0 |
| 22 | MF | (Scotland) SCO | Dominic Shiels | 10 | 2 | 0+2 | 0 | 1+1 | 0 | 5+1 | 2 | 0 | 0 |
| 24 | DF | (Scotland) SCO | Aaron Eadie | 11 | 0 | 0+3 | 0 | 0+1 | 0 | 7 | 0 | 0 | 0 |
| 25 | FW | (Scotland) SCO | Barrie McKay | 2 | 0 | 0+2 | 0 | 0 | 0 | 0 | 0 | 0 | 0 |
| 26 | MF | (Scotland) SCO | Ali Crawford | 5 | 1 | 0+3 | 1 | 0 | 0 | 0+2 | 0 | 0 | 0 |
| 27 | MF | (Scotland) SCO | Stuart McKinstry | 24 | 4 | 14 | 4 | 4 | 0 | 2+4 | 0 | 0 | 0 |
| 28 | FW | (Scotland) SCO | Ben Black | 2 | 0 | 0+1 | 0 | 0 | 0 | 0+1 | 0 | 0 | 0 |
| 29 | FW | (Scotland) SCO | Andy Ryan | 18 | 10 | 12+1 | 8 | 0+1 | 1 | 2+2 | 1 | 0 | 0 |
| 33 | DF | (Scotland) SCO | Stephen Hendrie | 22 | 1 | 16 | 1 | 4 | 0 | 1+1 | 0 | 0 | 0 |
| 48 | MF | (Scotland) SCO | Jamie Herd | 0 | 0 | 0 | 0 | 0 | 0 | 0 | 0 | 0 | 0 |
| | DF | (Scotland) SCO | Lennon Lyons | 1 | 0 | 0 | 0 | 0 | 0 | 0+1 | 0 | 0 | 0 |
Players who left the club during the 2025–26 season
| 23 | MF | (Scotland) SCO | Marcus Syme | 1 | 0 | 0 | 0 | 0 | 0 | 1 | 0 | 0 | 0 |
| 47 | MF | (Scotland) SCO | Josh Carson | 2 | 0 | 0 | 0 | 0 | 0 | 2 | 0 | 0 | 0 |
| 51 | GK | (Scotland) SCO | Neil Stafford | 0 | 0 | 0 | 0 | 0 | 0 | 0 | 0 | 0 | 0 |
| 52 | GK | (Scotland) SCO | Michael Marks | 1 | 0 | 0 | 0 | 0 | 0 | 1 | 0 | 0 | 0 |

== Team statistics ==
=== League table ===
| Pos | Team | Pld | W | D | L | GF | GA | GD | Pts | Promotion, qualification or relegation |
|---|---|---|---|---|---|---|---|---|---|---|
| 1 | Ross County | 16 | 14 | 2 | 0 | 56 | 11 | +45 | 44 | Promotion to the Championship |
| 2 | Hamilton Academical | 16 | 11 | 3 | 2 | 31 | 13 | +18 | 36 | Qualification for the Championship play-offs |
| 3 | East Kilbride | 15 | 7 | 3 | 5 | 27 | 20 | +7 | 24 | Qualification for the Championship play-offs |
| 4 | Airdrieonians | 16 | 6 | 4 | 6 | 17 | 22 | −5 | 22 | Qualification for the Championship play-offs |
| 5 | Montrose | 16 | 6 | 3 | 7 | 20 | 27 | −7 | 21 | |

Updated to match(es) played on 21 November 2026. Source:
Rules for classification: 1) Points; 2) Goal difference; 3) Goals scored; 4) Head-to head points; 5) Head-to-head goal difference; 6) Play-off (only for deciding promotion, play-off participation and relegation).

=== League Cup table ===
| Pos | Team | Pld | W | PW | PL | L | GF | GA | GD | Pts | Qualification | KIL | HAM | RAI | PET | ELG |
|---|---|---|---|---|---|---|---|---|---|---|---|---|---|---|---|---|
| 1 | Kilmarnock | 4 | 2 | 1 | 1 | 0 | 2 | 0 | +2 | 9 | Qualification for the second round | — | 1–0 | p0–0 | — | — |
| 2 | Hamilton Academical | 4 | 2 | 1 | 0 | 1 | 7 | 2 | +5 | 8 | | — | — | p1–1 | — | 5–0 |
| 3 | Raith Rovers | 4 | 2 | 0 | 2 | 0 | 5 | 2 | +3 | 8 | | — | — | — | 1–0 | 3–1 |
| 4 | Peterhead | 4 | 1 | 1 | 0 | 2 | 3 | 3 | 0 | 5 | | p0–0 | 0–1 | — | — | — |
| 5 | Elgin City | 4 | 0 | 0 | 0 | 4 | 2 | 12 | −10 | 0 | | 0–1 | — | — | 1–3 | — |

Rules for classification: 1) goal difference, 2) goals scored, 3) away goals scored, 4) matches won, 5) away matches won, 6) drawing of lots.

=== Challenge Cup table ===
| Pos | Team | Pld | W | D | L | GF | GA | GD | Pts | Qualification |
|---|---|---|---|---|---|---|---|---|---|---|
| 7 | Elgin City | 6 | 4 | 0 | 2 | 14 | 3 | +11 | 12 | Advance to Second round (unseeded) |
| 8 | Alloa Athletic | 6 | 3 | 3 | 0 | 12 | 5 | +7 | 12 | Advance to Second round (unseeded) |
| 9 | Hamilton Academical | 6 | 4 | 0 | 2 | 11 | 4 | +7 | 12 | Advance to Second round (unseeded) |
| 10 | Montrose | 6 | 4 | 0 | 2 | 13 | 8 | +5 | 12 | Advance to Second round (unseeded) |
| 11 | Celtic B | 6 | 3 | 3 | 0 | 18 | 14 | +4 | 12 | Advance to Second round (unseeded) |

Source: SPFL
Rules for classification: 1) Points; 2) Goal difference; 3) Goals scored; 4) Highest number of wins; 5) Lower disciplinary points; 6) Drawing of lots.

== Transfers ==
=== Players in ===
| Player | From | Fee |
|---|---|---|
| (Scotland) Andy Ryan | (Northern Ireland) Larne | Free |
| (Scotland) Aaron Comrie | (Scotland) Greenock Morton | Free |
| (Scotland) Aaron Comrie | (Scotland) Airdrieonians | Free |
| (Scotland) Fergus Owens | (Scotland) Greenock Morton | Free |
| (Scotland) Kalvin Orsi | (Scotland) Alloa Athletic | Free |
| (Scotland) Cameron Blues | (Scotland) Greenock Morton | Free |
| (Scotland) Taylor Sutherland | (Scotland) Dunfermline Athletic | Free |
| (Scotland) Gregor Crookston | (Scotland) Heart of Midlothian | Free |
| (Wales) Kai Smutek | (Scotland) Heart of Midlothian | Free |
| (Scotland) Stuart Bannigan | (Scotland) Ayr United | Free |
| (Scotland) Aiden McGinley | (Scotland) Queen's Park | Free |
| (Scotland) Ali Crawford | Unattached | Free |
| (Scotland) Barrie McKay | Unattached | Free |

=== Players out ===
| Player | To | Fee |
|---|---|---|
| (Scotland) Kayden Aitken | (Scotland) Lanark United | Free |
| (Scotland) Kai Black | (Scotland) Kilmarnock | Free |
| (Scotland) Finlay Cameron | (England) Preston North End | Free |
| (Scotland) Barry Maguire | (Scotland) East Kilbride | Free |
| (Scotland) Ben Reilly | | Free |
| (Scotland) Cole Stirling | (Scotland) Whitletts Victoria | Free |
| (Scotland) Oli Shaw | (Scotland) Dunfermline Athletic | Undisclosed |
| (Scotland) Kevin O'Hara | (Northern Ireland) Larne | Free |
| (Scotland) Josh Carson | (Scotland) Ayr United | Free |

=== Loans in ===
| Player | From | Fee |

=== Loans out ===
| Player | To | Fee |
|---|---|---|
| (Scotland) Neil Stafford | (Scotland) Forfar Athletic | Loan |
| (Scotland) Marcus Syme | (Scotland) Forfar Athletic | Loan |
| (Scotland) Michael Marks | (Scotland) Whitburn | Loan |
