= Barry Maguire =

Barry Maguire may refer to:

- Barry Maguire (footballer, born 1989), Dutch footballer
- Barry Maguire (footballer, born 1998), Scottish footballer

== See also ==
- Barry McGuire, American singer-songwriter
