= 2024–25 Hamilton Academical F.C. season =

Hamilton Academical
2024–25 season
- Chairman: John Brown (until 29 October); Jock Brown (from 29 October)
- Manager: John Rankin
- Stadium: New Douglas Park
- Scottish Championship: Tenth place (Relegated)
- Scottish Cup: Fifth round
- League Cup: Group stage
- Challenge Cup: Fourth round
- Top goalscorer: League: Oli Shaw (11); All: Oli Shaw (16)
- Highest home attendance: 2,561 vs. Ayr United, Championship, 1 February 2025
- Lowest home attendance: 308 vs. Dundee United B, Challenge Cup, 3 September 2024
- Average home league attendance: 1,417
Home colours	Away colours	Third colours

The 2024–25 season was Hamilton Academical's first season back in the second tier of Scottish football, following their promotion from League One at the end of the 2023–24 season. Hamilton also competed in the League Cup, Challenge Cup and the Scottish Cup.

== Summary ==
The 2024–25 saw Hamilton celebrate their 150th anniversary.

On 17 April 2025, Hamilton were deducted 15 points and fined £9,000 for multiple breaches of SPFL rules. On 1 May, one day before the final round of Championship fixtures were scheduled to be played, the SPFL upheld their decision after the club had submitted an appeal, confirming Hamilton's relegation to League One.

== Results and fixtures ==
Win Draw Loss Postponed

=== Pre-season and friendlies ===
29 June 2024 Friendly	Hamilton Academical XI	4–0	Cumbernauld Colts	Hamilton
12:30 BST	Kilday 6', 32'; Martin 42'; Cameron 83'			Stadium: New Douglas Park

29 June 2024 Friendly	Hamilton Academical XI	2–0	Gala Fairydean Rovers	Hamilton
15:30 BST	Kalala 65'; 80'			Stadium: New Douglas Park

6 July 2024 Friendly	Kelty Hearts	2–1	Hamilton Academical	Kelty
15:00 BST	Johnston 74'		Shaw	Stadium: New Central Park

=== Scottish Championship ===
3 August 2024 1	Hamilton Academical	0–2	Ayr United	Hamilton
15:00	Martin (red card) 68'	Report	Stanger 18'; Dowds 72'	Stadium: New Douglas Park; Attendance: 1,468; Referee: Lloyd Wilson

10 August 2024 2	Greenock Morton	0–0	Hamilton Academical	Greenock
15:00		Report		Stadium: Cappielow; Attendance: 1,866; Referee: Dan McFarlane

17 August 2024 3	Ayr United	3–2	Hamilton Academical	Ayr
15:00	Murphy 8'; Rus 51'; Oakley 66'	Report	Shaw 27'; Barjonas 38'	Stadium: Somerset Park; Attendance: 2,846; Referee: Gavin Duncan

24 August 2024 4	Hamilton Academical	1–0	Dunfermline Athletic	Hamilton
15:00	Tumilty 26'	Report		Stadium: New Douglas Park; Attendance: 2,022; Referee: Calum Scott

31 August 2024 5	Hamilton Academical	2–2	Airdrieonians	Hamilton
15:00	Shaw 47', 77'	Report	Reid 80'; Aiken 87'	Stadium: New Douglas Park; Attendance: 1,525; Referee: Grant Irvine

14 September 2024 6	Livingston	3–0	Hamilton Academical	Livingston
15:00	Pittman 56'; Muirhead 81', 87'	Report		Stadium: Almondvale Stadium; Attendance: 1,241; Referee: Duncan Williams

21 September 2024 7	Raith Rovers	3–3	Hamilton Academical	Kirkcaldy
15:00	Stevenson 15'; Pollock 36'; Easton 54'	Report	O'Hara 2' (pen.); Smith 79'; Shaw 90+4'	Stadium: Stark's Park; Attendance: 3,322; Referee: Lloyd Wilson

28 September 2024 8	Hamilton Academical	1–0	Partick Thistle	Hamilton
15:00	Kilday 56'	Report		Stadium: New Douglas Park; Attendance: 1,677; Referee: David Dickinson

5 October 2024 9	Queen's Park	1–0	Hamilton Academical	Glasgow
15:00	Turner 62'	Report		Stadium: Hampden Park; Attendance: 1,259; Referee: Dan McFarlane

18 October 2024 10	Hamilton Academical	1–3	Falkirk	Hamilton
19:45	Henderson 47'	Report	Maguire 5' (o.g.); Miller 29'; Spencer 34'	Stadium: New Douglas Park; Attendance: 1,753; Referee: Matthew MacDermid

26 October 2024 11	Hamilton Academical	3–0	Greenock Morton	Hamilton
15:00	Shaw 77', 81', 84'	Report		Stadium: New Douglas Park; Attendance: 1,071; Referee: Lloyd Wilson

2 November 2024 12	Airdrieonians	0–4	Hamilton Academical	Airdrie
15:00		Report	Smith 3'; Graham 9' (o.g.); O'Hara 54'; McGowan 82'	Stadium: Excelsior Stadium; Attendance: 1,501; Referee: Euan Anderson

9 November 2024 13	Hamilton Academical	1–3	Livingston	Hamilton
15:00	O'Hara 42'	Report	May 40'; Smith 50'; Winter 90+2'	Stadium: New Douglas Park; Attendance: 1,033; Referee: Grant Irvine

16 November 2024 14	Partick Thistle	5–1	Hamilton Academical	Airdrie
15:00	Robinson 5', 20'; Graham 49', 66'; Chalmers 64'	Report	O'Hara 45'	Stadium: Firhill Stadium; Attendance: 3,845; Referee: Ross Hardie

7 December 2024 15	Dunfermline Athletic	3–2	Hamilton Academical	Dunfermline
15:00	M.Todd 56'; Cooper 83', 88'	Report	McGinty 74'; Shaw 90+3' (pen.)	Stadium: East End Park; Attendance: 4,286; Referee: Iain Snedden

14 December 2024 16	Hamilton Academical	2–1	Queen's Park	Hamilton
15:00	Bradley 3', 37'	Report	Rudden 16' (pen.)	Stadium: New Douglas Park; Attendance: 1,076; Referee: Chris Graham

21 December 2024 17	Falkirk	1–0	Hamilton Academical	Falkirk
15:00	Morrison 80'	Report		Stadium: Falkirk Stadium; Attendance: 5,532; Referee: Calum Scott

28 December 2024 18	Hamilton Academical	3–2	Airdrieonians	Hamilton
15:00	Shaw 14', 90'; McKinstry 38'	Report	Mochrie 19'; Gallagher 45'	Stadium: New Douglas Park; Attendance: 1,476; Referee: Don Robertson

10 January 2025 19	Hamilton Academical	1–2	Partick Thistle	Hamilton
19:45	Tumilty 61'	Report	Graham 75'; Stanway 82'	Stadium: New Douglas Park; Attendance: 1,122; Referee: Iain Snedden

25 January 2025 20	Livingston	3–0	Hamilton Academical	Livingston
15:00	Muirhead 3'; Montaño 16'; Smith 90+2'	Report		Stadium: Almondvale Stadium; Attendance: 1,078; Referee: Euan Anderson

28 January 2025 21	Hamilton Academical	0–3	Raith Rovers	Hamilton
19:45		Report	Pollock 3'; Gullan 7'; Marsh 31'	Stadium: New Douglas Park; Attendance: 1,005; Referee: Duncan Nicolson

1 February 2025 22	Hamilton Academical	0–2	Ayr United	Hamilton
15:00		Report	McKenzie 80'; Stanger 84'	Stadium: New Douglas Park; Attendance: 2,561; Referee: Matthew MacDermid

15 February 2025 23	Queen's Park	1–2	Hamilton Academical	Glasgow
15:00	Welsh 60'	Report	Robinson 5'; Lamie 13'	Stadium: Hampden Park; Attendance: 1,147; Referee: Colin Steven

18 February 2025 24	Greenock Morton	2–0	Hamilton Academical	Greenock
19:45	Adeloye 28'; Lyall 79'	Report		Stadium: Cappielow; Attendance: 1,541; Referee: Euan Anderson

22 February 2025 25	Raith Rovers	2–0	Hamilton Academical	Kirkcaldy
15:00	Easton 30' (pen.); Pollock 64'	Report		Stadium: Stark's Park; Attendance: 3,344; Referee: Ross Hardie

25 February 2025 26	Hamilton Academical	1–0	Dunfermline Athletic	Hamilton
19:45	McKinstry 63'	Report		Stadium: New Douglas Park; Attendance: 1,098; Referee: Chris Graham

1 March 2025 27	Hamilton Academical	2–2	Falkirk	Hamilton
15:00	Reghan Tumilty 36'; McKinstry 44'	Report	Henderson 21'; Ageyman 90+1'	Stadium: New Douglas Park; Attendance: 2,291; Referee: Grant Irvine

8 March 2025 28	Airdrieonians	2–1	Hamilton Academical	Airdrie
15:00	Frizzell 64'; Gallagher 85'	Report	McGinty 83'	Stadium: Excelsior Stadium; Attendance: 1,584; Referee: Steven McLean

15 March 2025 29	Hamilton Academical	0–2	Greenock Morton	Hamilton
15:00		Report	Keay 86'; Crawford 90+6'	Stadium: New Douglas Park; Attendance: 1,055; Referee: Iain Snedden

22 March 2025 30	Ayr United	1–1	Hamilton Academical	Ayr
15:00	Walker 90+5'	Report	Shaw 65'	Stadium: Somerset Park; Attendance: 2,587; Referee: Chris Graham

29 March 2025 31	Hamilton Academical	0–3	Raith Rovers	Hamilton
15:00		Report	Easton 43'; Fordyce 65'; Mullin 75'	Stadium: New Douglas Park; Attendance: 1,007; Referee: Dan McFarlane

5 April 2025 32	Dunfermline Athletic	0–1	Hamilton Academical	Dunfermline
15:00		Report	Tumilty 41'	Stadium: East End Park; Attendance: 7,636; Referee: Euan Anderson

12 April 2025 33	Partick Thistle	1–2	Hamilton Academical	Glasgow
15:00	Graham 90+5'	Report	Todorov 15'; Robinson 17'	Stadium: Firhill Stadium; Attendance: 3,421; Referee: Duncan Nicolson

19 April 2025 34	Hamilton Academical	0–0	Queen's Park	Hamilton
15:00		Report		Stadium: New Douglas Park; Attendance: 1,102; Referee: Don Robertson

26 April 2025 35	Hamilton Academical	0–3	Livingston	Hamilton
15:00		Report	Muirhead 27' (pen.), 36'; Yengi 52'	Stadium: New Douglas Park; Attendance: 1,155; Referee: Iain Snedden

2 May 2025 36	Falkirk	3–1	Hamilton Academical	Falkirk
19:45	Ross 33', 59'; Miller 71'	Report	Robinson 5'	Stadium: Falkirk Stadium; Attendance: 7,633; Referee: Steven McLean

=== Scottish League Cup ===
==== Group stage ====
13 July 2024 1	Hamilton Academical	0–0 (2–4 p)	Stirling Albion	Hamilton
15:00		Report		Stadium: New Douglas Park; Attendance: 668; Referee: Lloyd Wilson

20 July 2024 2	Stranraer	0–3	Hamilton Academical	Stranraer
15:00		Report	Bradley 34'; MacDonald 54'; Henderson 86'	Stadium: Stair Park; Attendance: 438; Referee: Peter Stuart

23 July 2024 3	Hamilton Academical	1–2	Ross County	Hamilton
19:45	Shaw 6'	Report	Hale 25'; White 28'	Stadium: New Douglas Park; Attendance: 561; Referee: Matthew McDermid

27 July 2024 4	Raith Rovers	1–1 (5–3 p)	Hamilton Academical	Kirkcaldy
15:00	Kilday 61' (o.g.)	Report	McGinty 56'	Stadium: Stark's Park; Attendance: 1,910; Referee: Chris Graham

=== Scottish Challenge Cup ===
3 September 2024 Third round	Hamilton Academical	4–0	Dundee United B	Hamilton
19:45	O'Hara 4', 49'; MacDonald 7'; Shaw 89'	Report		Stadium: New Douglas Park; Attendance: 308; Referee: Stewart Luke

11 October 2024 Fourth round	Hamilton Academical	0–1	Greenock Morton	Hamilton
19:40		Report	Stuparević 17' (pen.)	Stadium: New Douglas Park; Attendance: 711; Referee: Ross Hardie

=== Scottish Cup ===
30 November 2024 Third round	Banks O'Dee	1–2	Hamilton Academical	Aberdeen
15:00	Philipson 62'	Report	Shaw 28', 45+1'	Stadium: Spain Park; Attendance: 350; Referee: Graham Grainger

18 January 2025 Fourth round	Hamilton Academical	3–1	Musselburgh Athletic	Hamilton
15:00	Hendrie 24'; McGinty 89'; Shaw 90+5'	Report	Todd 49'	Stadium: New Douglas Park; Attendance: 1,301; Referee: Graham Grainger

8 February 2025 Fifth round	St Johnstone	1–0	Hamilton Academical	Perth
15:00	Sidibeh 86'	Report		Stadium: McDiarmid Park; Attendance: 3,095; Referee: Nick Walsh

== Squad statistics ==
=== Appearances ===
As of 2 May 2025

No.	Pos	Nat	Player	Total		Championship		League Cup		Challenge Cup		Scottish Cup	
No.	Pos	Nat	Player	Apps	Goals	Apps	Goals	Apps	Goals	Apps	Goals	Apps	Goals
1	GK	(England) ENG	Charlie Albinson	21	0	17	0	2	0	0	0	2	0
2	DF	(Scotland) SCO	Fergus Owens	0	0	0	0	0	0	0	0	0	0
3	DF	(Scotland) SCO	Jackson Longridge	26	0	13+9	0	0	0	2	0	0+2	0
4	DF	(Scotland) SCO	Lee Kilday	13	1	6+4	1	3	0	0	0	0	0
5	DF	(Republic of Ireland) IRL	Sean McGinty	43	4	33+1	2	4	1	2	0	3	1
6	DF	(Australia) AUS	Dylan McGowan	18	1	12+2	1	1	0	0+1	0	2	0
7	FW	(Scotland) SCO	Euan Henderson	40	2	10+21	1	1+3	1	2	0	0+3	0
9	FW	(Scotland) SCO	Kevin O'Hara	41	6	17+15	4	4	0	2	2	3	0
10	MF	(Scotland) SCO	Jamie Barjonas	38	1	17+13	1	3+1	0	1+1	0	1+1	0
11	MF	(Scotland) SCO	Steven Bradley	40	3	21+10	2	3+1	1	1+1	0	2+1	0
13	MF	(Scotland) SCO	Connor Smith	28	2	22+3	2	0	0	0	0	3	0
14	MF	(Scotland) SCO	Barry Maguire	39	0	28+2	0	3+1	0	1+1	0	2+1	0
15	DF	(Scotland) SCO	Ricki Lamie	11	1	7+3	1	0	0	0	0	1	0
16	DF	(Scotland) SCO	Kyle MacDonald	33	2	22+3	0	2+2	1	1	1	1+2	0
17	MF	(Scotland) SCO	Scott Robinson	14	2	14	2	0	0	0	0	0	0
18	FW	(Bulgaria) BUL	Nikolay Todorov	37	1	9+22	1	0+3	0	2	0	1	0
19	FW	(Scotland) SCO	Oli Shaw	42	16	31+2	11	4	1	0+2	1	2+1	3
20	MF	(Scotland) SCO	Ben Williamson	14	0	4+8	0	2	0	0	0	0	0
21	GK	(England) ENG	Dean Lyness	23	0	18	0	2	0	2	0	1	0
22	DF	(Scotland) SCO	Reghan Tumilty	37	4	25+4	4	3	0	1+1	0	2+1	0
24	MF	(Scotland) SCO	Stuart McKinstry	22	3	7+12	3	0	0	0	0	2+1	0
25	MF	(Scotland) SCO	Charlie Telfer	8	0	5+3	0	0	0	0	0	0	0
30	DF	(Scotland) SCO	Tony Gallacher	6	0	4+2	0	0	0	0	0	0	0
33	DF	(Scotland) SCO	Stephen Hendrie	32	1	20+5	0	4	0	0	0	3	1
35	DF	(Scotland) SCO	Chris Neeson	0	0	0	0	0	0	0	0	0	0
45	MF	(Scotland) SCO	Aaron Eadie	1	0	0	0	0	0	1	0	0	0
Players who left the club during the 2024–25 season
8	MF	(Scotland) SCO	Scott Martin	26	0	20	0	3	0	1	0	2	0
15	DF	(England) ENG	Oludare Olufunwa	4	0	1+2	0	0	0	0+1	0	0	0
23	MF	(Republic of Ireland) IRL	Daire O'Connor	7	0	0+4	0	0+2	0	0+1	0	0	0
17	MF	(Scotland) SCO	Connor Murray	5	0	0+1	0	0+4	0	0	0	0	0
27	FW	(Scotland) SCO	Liam Morgan	3	0	0	0	0+2	0	1	0	0	0
31	GK	(Scotland) SCO	Jamie Smith	0	0	0	0	0	0	0	0	0	0
34	DF	(Scotland) SCO	Arran Preston	0	0	0	0	0	0	0	0	0	0
37	FW	(Scotland) SCO	Gravine Kalala	0	0	0	0	0	0	0	0	0	0
41	GK	(Scotland) SCO	Josh Lane	0	0	0	0	0	0	0	0	0	0
44	FW	(Scotland) SCO	Lewis Latona	0	0	0	0	0	0	0	0	0	0

== Team statistics ==
=== League table ===
Pos	Team	Pld	W	D	L	GF	GA	GD	Pts	Promotion, qualification or relegation
6	Greenock Morton	36	12	12	12	42	48	−6	48	
7	Dunfermline Athletic	36	9	8	19	28	43	−15	35	
8	Queen's Park	36	9	8	19	36	55	−19	35	
9	Airdrieonians (O)	36	7	8	21	34	62	−28	29	Qualification for the Championship play-offs
10	Hamilton Academical (R)	36	10	6	20	38	64	−26	21 (Note: Hamilton Academical were deducted 15 points for breaching multiple SPFL Rules.)	Relegation to League One

Rules for classification: 1) Points; 2) Goal difference; 3) Goals scored; 4) Head-to-to head points; 5) Head-to-head goal difference; 6) Play-off (only for deciding promotion, play-off participation and relegation).
(O) Play-off winners; (R) Relegated

=== League Cup table ===
Pos	Team	Pld	W	PW	PL	L	GF	GA	GD	Pts	Qualification	ROS	RAI	HAM	STI	STR
1	Ross County	4	4	0	0	0	10	3	+7	12	Qualification for the second round	—	2–1	—	3–0	—
2	Raith Rovers	4	2	1	0	1	7	4	+3	8		—	—	p1–1	—	2–1
3	Hamilton Academical	4	1	0	2	1	5	3	+2	5		1–2	—	—	0–0p	—
4	Stirling Albion	4	0	2	0	2	2	8	−6	4		—	0–3	—	—	p2–2
5	Stranraer	4	0	0	1	3	4	10	−6	1		1–3	—	0–3	—	—

Rules for classification: 1) goal difference, 2) goals scored, 3) away goals scored, 4) matches won, 5) away matches won, 6) drawing of lots.

== Transfers ==
=== Players in ===
Player	From	Fee
(England) Charlie Albinson	(Scotland) Ayr United	Free
(Scotland) Barry Maguire	(Scotland) Motherwell	Free
(Scotland) Steven Bradley	(Scotland) Livingston	Free
(Republic of Ireland) Sean McGinty	(Scotland) Ayr United	Free
(Scotland) Oli Shaw	(England) Barnsley	Free
(Bulgaria) Nikolay Todorov	(Scotland) Airdrieonians	Free
(Republic of Ireland) Daire O'Connor	(Northern Ireland) Glentoran	Undisclosed
(Scotland) Stuart McKinstry	(Scotland) Queen's Park	Free
(Scotland) Tony Gallacher	(Scotland) St Johnstone	Free
(Scotland) Connor Smith	(Scotland) St Johnstone	Undisclosed
(Scotland) Scott Robinson	(Scotland) Partick Thistle	Free

=== Players out ===
Player	To	Fee
(Scotland) Lewis Smith	(Scotland) Livingston	Free
(Scotland) Ryan Fulton	(Scotland) Heart of Midlothian	Free
(Sweden) Joel Mumbongo	(Scotland) Dumbarton	Free
(Scotland) Marley Redfern	(Scotland) Clyde	Free
(Scotland) Jamie Hamilton	(Scotland) Ayr United	Free
(Scotland) Chris McGinn	(Scotland) Civil Service Strollers	Free
(Scotland) Joe McGlynn	(Australia) Green Gully SC	Free
(Scotland) Andy Winter	(Scotland) Livingston	Free
(Scotland) Michael Hewitt	(Scotland) Queen of the South	Free
(Scotland) Scott Martin	(Scotland) Partick Thistle	Free

=== Loans in ===
Player	From	Fee
(England) Oludare Olufunwa	(Scotland) St Johnstone	Loan
(Scotland) Connor Smith	(Scotland) St Johnstone	Loan
(Scotland) Ricki Lamie	(Scotland) Ross County	Loan
(Scotland) Charlie Telfer	(Scotland) Ross County	Loan

=== Loans out ===
Player	To	Fee
(Scotland) Jamie Smith	(Scotland) Annan Athletic	Loan
(Scotland) Chris Neeson	(Scotland) Darvel	Loan
(Scotland) Arran Preston	(Scotland) Darvel	Loan
(Scotland) Connor Murray	(Northern Ireland) Coleraine	Loan
(Scotland) Gravine Kalala	(Scotland) Thorniewood United	Loan
(Scotland) Josh Lane	(Scotland) Thorniewood United	Loan
(Scotland) Lewis Latona	(Scotland) East Stirlingshire	Loan
(Scotland) Liam Morgan	(Scotland) The Spartans	Loan
(Scotland) Arran Preston	(Scotland) The Spartans	Loan
(Scotland) Josh Lane	(Scotland) Stranraer	Loan
(Scotland) Ben Black	(Scotland) Stenhousemuir	Loan
(Republic of Ireland) Daire O'Connor	(Scotland) East Kilbride	Loan
