= Jamie Smith (footballer, born 2002) =

Scottish footballer

Personal information
- Date of birth: 8 May 2002 (age 24)
- Position: Goalkeeper

Team information
- Current team: Kelty Hearts
- Number: 1

Youth career
- Hamilton Academical

Senior career*
Years	Team	Apps	(Gls)
2020–2026	Hamilton Academical	38	(0)
2020–2021	→ Rossvale (loan)		
2021	→ Broomhill (loan)		
2022	→ Blackburn United (loan)		
2024–2025	→ Annan Athletic (loan)	35	(0)
2026	Livingston	0	(0)
2026–	Kelty Hearts	11	(0)

International career^{‡}
2019	Scotland U17	3	(0)
- * Club domestic league appearances and goals as of 23:51, 18 October 2026 (UTC) ‡ National team caps and goals as of 15:30, 16 May 2021 (UTC)

Jamie Smith (born 8 May 2002) is a Scottish professional footballer who plays as a goalkeeper for Scottish League Two side Kelty Hearts.

Smith began his career with Hamilton Academical and had loan spells at Rossvale, Broomhill, Blackburn United and Annan Athletic.

== Club career ==
Smith began his career with Hamilton Academical, moving on loan to Rossvale in October 2020. He made his senior debut for Hamilton on 16 May 2021. He moved on loan to Broomhill in August 2021. On 16 February 2022, Smith joined East of Scotland League Premier Division side Blackburn United on loan for the remainder of the 2021–22 season. He was recalled by Accies on 25 February.

In June 2024 he moved on loan to Annan Athletic for the 2024–25 season.

He was released by Hamilton at the end of the 2024–25 season. However, he remained at Hamilton at the start of the 2025–26 season, before eventually departing in January 2026 to sign for Livingston. He left Livingston in May 2026 following the expiration of his contract.

On 29 May 2026, Smith signed for Scottish League Two side Kelty Hearts.

== International career ==
He has played for Scotland at under-17 level.

== Career statistics ==
As of match played on 17 January 2026

Appearances and goals by club, season and competition
Club	Season	League			Scottish Cup		Scottish League Cup		Other		Total	
Club	Season	Division	Apps	Goals	Apps	Goals	Apps	Goals	Apps	Goals	Apps	Goals
Hamilton Academical	2020–21	Scottish Premiership	1	0	0	0	0	0	0	0	1	0
Hamilton Academical	2021–22	Scottish Championship	0	0	0	0	0	0	0	0	0	0
Hamilton Academical	2022–23	Scottish Championship	3	0	0	0	0	0	7 (Note: Four appearances in the Scottish League Challenge Cup; three appearances in the play-offs)	0	10	0
Hamilton Academical	2023–24	Scottish League One	14	0	0	0	4	0	1 (Note: Appearance(s) in the Scottish League Challenge Cup)	0	19	0
Hamilton Academical	2024–25	Scottish Championship	0	0	0	0	0	0	0	0	0	0
Hamilton Academical	2025–26	Scottish League One	20	0	1	0	3	0	1	0	25	0
Hamilton Academical	Total		38	0	1	0	7	0	9	0	55	0
Annan Athletic (loan)	2024–25	League One	35	0	1	0	3	0	6 (Note: Two appearances in the Scottish League Challenge Cup; four appearances in the play-offs)	0	45	0
Livingston	2025–26	Scottish Premiership	0	0	0	0	0	0	0	0	0	0
Career total			73	0	2	0	10	0	15	0	100	0

== Honours ==
Hamilton Academical

- Scottish Challenge Cup: 2022–23
