= Blackburn United F.C. =

Association football club in Scotland

Blackburn United
- Full name: Blackburn United Football Club
- Nickname: The Burnie
- Founded: 1978
- Ground: Purdie Worldwide Community Stadium (New Murrayfield Park); Ash Grove; Blackburn
- Capacity: 1,500
- Coordinates: 55°52′24″N 3°37′9″W
- President: Ian McGinty
- Manager: Andrew Meechan
- League: East of Scotland League Premier Division
- 2025–26: East of Scotland League First Division, 5th of 16 (promoted)
- Website: https://blackburnunitedcommunitysc.com/first-team-%26-u20s
Home colours	Away colours

Blackburn United Football Club are a Scottish football club from the town of Blackburn, West Lothian. The team plays at Tier 6 of the Scottish Football Pyramid in the East of Scotland League Premier Division having moved from the junior leagues in 2018. Blackburn United became full members of the Scottish Football Association in June 2019.

== History ==
Formed in 1978, the club joined the junior grade of football two years later before taking the step up into Senior football in 2018. United play their home matches at the purpose-built Purdie Worldwide Community Stadium (New Murrayfield Park), which has room for 1,100 spectators, in the centre of the town. The whole facility that is the Purdie Worldwide Community Stadium complex boasts a six-dressing room pavilion and associated amenities, an enclosed and floodlit 3G main Stadium pitch and three further 11-a-side pitches.

The club was one of many to move from junior football to the East of Scotland Football League in 2018.

== Community Club ==
The Club forms the pinnacle of the Blackburn United Community Sports Club, a fully accredited SFA Community Club and Scottish Charitable Incorporated Organisation which, in addition to adult semi-professional football, caters for under age football at all ages from under-9 to under-20 as well as ladies, girls and additional needs football and a variety of other sporting and social activities. For younger age groups there are girls and boys soccer schools with their own dedicated coaches.

== Current squad ==
As of 10 July 2026

Note: Flags indicate national team as defined under FIFA eligibility rules; some limited exceptions apply. Players may hold more than one non-FIFA nationality.

No.	Pos.	Nation	Player
—	GK	SCO	Craig Saunders
—	GK	SCO	Gavin King
—	GK	POL	Miko Komocki
—	DF	SCO	Kieran Swanson
—	DF	SCO	Martin Lawrie
—	DF	SCO	James Mildren
—	DF	SCO	Finlay Anderson
—	DF	SCO	Kyle McClung
—	DF	SCO	John Drummond
—	DF	SCO	Lewis Alexander
—	MF	SCO	Stuart MacLeod
—	MF	SCO	David Howe
—	MF	SCO	Michael Browne (captain)

No.	Pos.	Nation	Player
—	MF	SCO	Lewis Turner
—	MF	SCO	James Russell
—	MF	SCO	Dominic Kane
—	MF	SCO	Richie Hutton
—	MF	SCO	Calum McDowall
—	MF	SCO	Michael Beagley
—	FW	NGR	Chris Aikamhenze
—	FW	SCO	Kieran Sweeney
—	FW	SCO	Kyle Connolly

== Club staff ==
=== Board of directors ===
Role	Nationality	Name
President	(Scotland)	Ian McGinty
Vice-president	(Scotland)	James Johnstone
Secretary	(Scotland)	David Jones
Treasurer	(Scotland)	Angela Campbell
Coach Development Officer	(Scotland)	Brian Smillie

=== Coaching staff ===
Role	Nationality	Name
Manager	(Scotland)	Andrew Meechan
Player/Assistant Manager	(Scotland)	Lewis Turner
coach	(Scotland)	stuart Wilson
Physio	(Scotland)	Lee Reid
GK coach	(Scotland)	stevie Baillie
GK coach	(Scotland)	scott Willis

== Managerial history ==
Name	Nationality	Years
Alex 'Kitty' Dunnigan	(Scotland)	1984-1986
Dick Hodgson	(Scotland)	1986
Jim Henderson	(Scotland)	1986-1989
Mark Campbell	(Scotland)	2005-2022
Jamie McCormick	(Scotland)	2022-2024
Andrew Meechan	(Scotland)	2024-

^{c} Caretaker manager

== Club records ==
=== Appearances ===
The club's record appearance holder until March 2014 was Craig Spence who, after signing from Airdrieonians at the beginning of the 1998–99 season, made 375 appearances and scored 20 goals before retiring in August 2012. On 15 March 2014, fellow Airdrie man Alan Brown, signed as a teenager at the beginning of the 1997–98 season and who had three spells at the club, surpassed Spence's record when making his 376th appearance for the club, scoring his 68th goal in the process. Alan went onto make a total of 409 appearances, scoring 69 goals, before leaving the club at the end of the 2014/15 season.

=== Goals ===
The club's record goalscorer is Andy McQuillan who, at the beginning of season 2019–20, had netted 173 goals in 235 starts and 24 substitute appearances.

== Notable former players ==
The following players have either played for Blackburn United before going on to forge careers at a higher level or have played for one of the club's predecessors before similarly going onto play at a higher level;

- Alan Irvine former Liverpool and Dundee United player.
- Chris Innes former Dundee United, Kilmarnock, St Mirren and Inverness Caledonian Thistle player who also captained Gretna to the 2006 Scottish Cup Final.
- Tommy Farr former Bradford Park Avenue player. Tommy was the goalkeeper for United's predecessors Blackburn Athletic when they won the 1934 Midlothian League Championship.
- Jimmy Stein former Everton player. Jimmy played for another of United's predecessors Blackburn Rovers in 1924 and was a winger who scored Everton's first-ever goal at Wembley when netting in the 1933 FA Cup Final.
