= Stephen Hendrie =

Scottish footballer

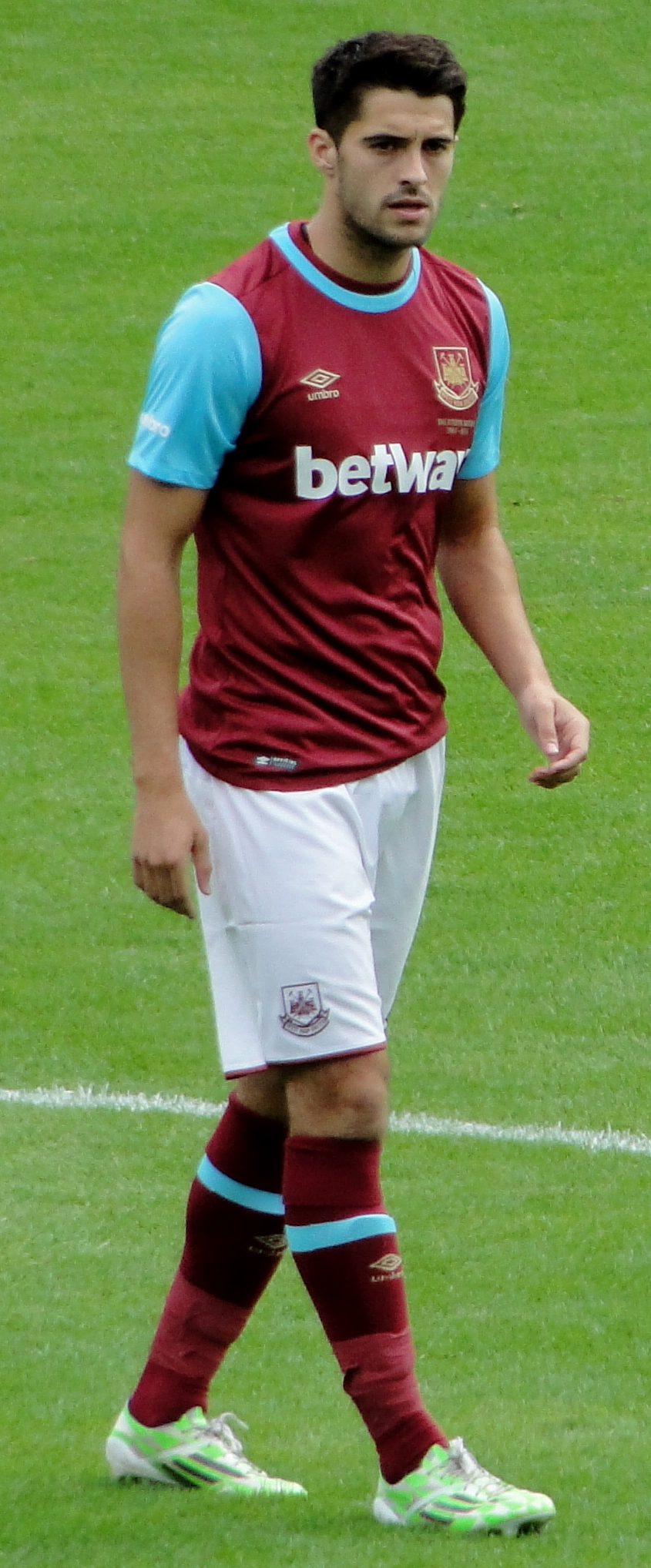
- Hendrie with West Ham United in July 2015

Personal information
- Full name: Stephen Hendrie
- Date of birth: 8 January 1995 (age 31)
- Place of birth: Glasgow, Scotland
- Height: 5 ft 10 in (1.78 m)
- Position: Left back

Team information
- Current team: Hamilton Academical
- Number: 33

Youth career
- –2011: Hamilton Academical

Senior career*
Years	Team	Apps	(Gls)
2011–2015	Hamilton Academical	100	(0)
2015–2017	West Ham United	0	(0)
2016	→ Southend United (loan)	5	(1)
2016–2017	→ Blackburn Rovers (loan)	4	(0)
2017–2019	Southend United	31	(0)
2018	→ Motherwell (loan)	6	(0)
2019–2020	Kilmarnock	2	(0)
2020–2021	Morecambe	36	(1)
2021–2022	Partick Thistle	13	(0)
2022–2023	Queen of the South	30	(1)
2023–	Hamilton Academical	88	(2)

International career^{‡}
2011–2012	Scotland U17	6	(1)
2013–2014	Scotland U19	5	(0)
2012	Scotland U20	3	(0)
2014	Scotland U21	3	(0)
- * Club domestic league appearances and goals as of 09:27, 22 November 2026 (UTC) ‡ National team caps and goals as of 17:00, 6 May 2023 (UTC)

Stephen Hendrie (born 8 January 1995) is a Scottish professional footballer who plays as a left back for Scottish League One club Hamilton Academical, whom he also captains.

He began his career with Hamilton Academical, making over 100 appearances for the club before moving to West Ham United in July 2015. He moved on loan to Southend United in January 2016. After a loan spell with Blackburn Rovers during the 2016–17 season, Hendrie returned to the Shrimpers on a permanent basis in June 2017. Hendrie spent time on loan with Motherwell in 2018, and after his release from the Roots Hall club, he signed for Kilmarnock in September 2019. After a season with Morecambe, Hendrie returned to Scotland to play for Partick Thistle and Queen of the South, before re-signing for Hamilton Academical

Hendrie is a former Scotland youth international and has played at under-21 level.

== Club career ==
=== Hamilton Academical ===
Born in Glasgow where he attended St Andrew's Secondary School, Hendrie began his career at Hamilton Academical. He made his club debut on 23 July 2011 in the Scottish Challenge Cup first round, replacing Derek Lyle after 60 minutes of an eventual 2–0 victory over Queen's Park at Hampden Park, and his Scottish Football League debut two weeks later, starting a 2–1 win at Ayr United on the first day of the new First Division season. At the end of the 2011–12 season, his first with the club's senior team, Hendrie described his year as a "dream." Hendrie described the next season, the 2012–13 season, as "[not] my best season" due to injuries and subsequent lack of playing time.

On 8 February 2014, he was sent off in the 50th minute of a 1–0 defeat at Dundee for a foul on Martin Boyle, with teammate Ziggy Gordon being dismissed later on. He was also given a red card on 12 April, in a 1–1 draw away to Livingston. Hamilton ended the season promoted from the Championship to the Scottish Premiership via the play-offs, and Hendrie made his top-flight debut on 9 August 2014, starting in a 0–2 home defeat to Inverness Caledonian Thistle on the opening day of the season. He played 30 league matches throughout the season, and was sent off on 24 September in the League Cup third round, a goalless draw with Motherwell at New Douglas Park, although his team won the penalty shootout.

=== West Ham United ===
In January 2015 he was linked with a transfer away from the club. Later that month a transfer to English club West Ham United was discussed, although it collapsed a day later. A few days later the deal was announced as back on. On 30 January 2015, Hendrie signed a pre-contract agreement to join West Ham on 1 July 2015.

On 15 January 2016 Hendrie joined League One side Southend United on an initial 31-day loan to cover for injured, regular left-back Ben Coker. He made his Southend debut on 16 January in a 0–0 draw away against Peterborough United. Hendrie scored his first goal in professional football when he netted the winner in a 2–1 victory against Shrewsbury Town on 2 February 2016

Hendrie joined Championship side Blackburn Rovers on loan for the 2016–17 season.

=== Southend United ===
On 29 June 2017 Hendrie returned to Southend United, signing a two-year contract.

On 31 January 2018, Hendrie moved on loan to Motherwell until the end of the 2017–18 season.

He was released by Southend at the end of the 2018–19 season.

=== Kilmarnock ===
In September 2019 he signed a one-year contract with Kilmarnock. He was released by the club at the end of the 2019–20 season.

=== Morecambe ===
On 1 August 2020, he signed a one-year deal with League Two club Morecambe, with manager Derek Adams calling him a "good fit" for the club. He was released by Morecambe at the end of the season, and was linked with a transfer to Bradford City, to join up with former Morecambe manager Derek Adams's new club.

=== Partick Thistle ===
Hendrie signed for Partick Thistle in September 2021.

=== Queen of the South ===
On 12 August 2022, after a short period without a club, Hendrie signed a one-year contract with Queen of the South.

=== Return to Hamilton ===
In June 2023 he returned to first club Hamilton Academical. In January 2026 he was appointed club captain. In July 2026 he was re-confirmed as club captain, and signed a new contract with the club, until 2028.

== International career ==
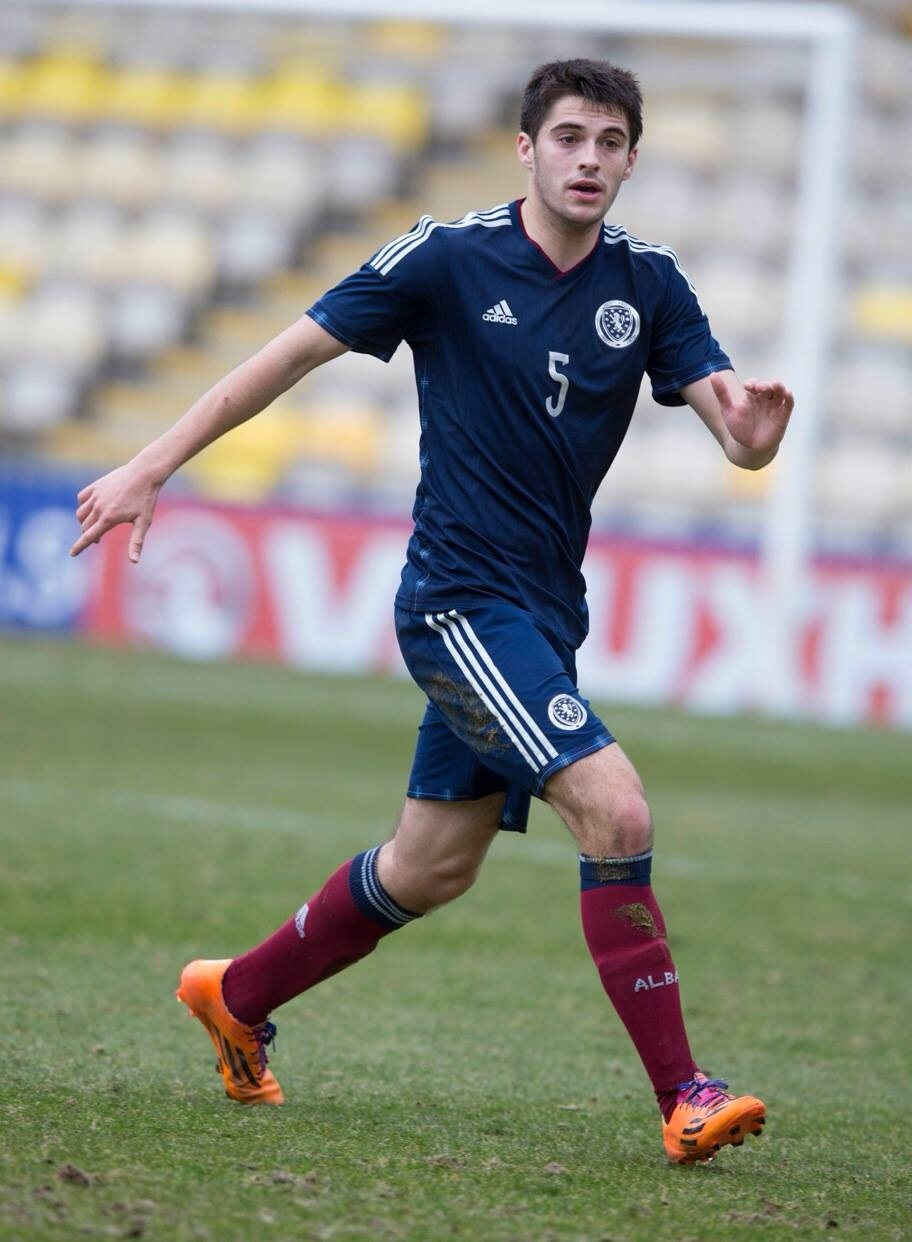
Hendrie on his Scotland under 19s debut in May 2014

Hendrie received his first international call up, to the Scotland under-17 squad on 12 October 2011.

In May 2012, Hendrie was called up to the Scotland under-20 squad for a youth tournament in the Netherlands, where he appeared in three of the tournament's five matches.

He made his international debut for the under-21s in September 2014.

== Personal life ==
Hendrie is a Celtic supporter.

== Career statistics ==
As of 21 November 2026

Appearances and goals by club, season and competition
Club	Season	League			National cup (Note: Includes Scottish Cup, FA Cup)		League cup (Note: Includes Scottish League Cup, EFL Cup)		Other		Total	
Club	Season	Division	Apps	Goals	Apps	Goals	Apps	Goals	Apps	Goals	Apps	Goals
Hamilton Academical	2011–12	Scottish First Division	25	0	2	0	0	0	3 (Note: Appearance(s) in the Scottish Challenge Cup)	0	30	0
Hamilton Academical	2012–13	Scottish First Division	23	0	2	0	3	0	0	0	28	0
Hamilton Academical	2013–14	Scottish Championship	22	0	1	0	2	0	1	0	26	0
Hamilton Academical	2014–15	Scottish Premiership	30	0	1	0	2	0	0	0	33	0
Hamilton Academical	Total		100	0	6	0	7	0	4	0	117	0
West Ham United	2015–16	Premier League	0	0	0	0	0	0	0	0	0	0
West Ham United	2016–17	Premier League	0	0	0	0	0	0	0	0	0	0
West Ham United	Total		0	0	0	0	0	0	0	0	0	0
Southend United (loan)	2015–16	EFL League One	5	1	0	0	0	0	0	0	5	1
Blackburn Rovers (loan)	2016–17	EFL Championship	4	0	0	0	3	0	1 (Note: Appearance(s) in the EFL Trophy)	0	8	0
Southend United	2017–18	EFL League One	13	0	0	0	1	0	2	0	16	0
Southend United	2018–19	EFL League One	18	0	3	0	0	0	4	0	25	0
Southend United	Total		31	0	3	0	1	0	6	0	41	0
Motherwell (loan)	2017–18	Scottish Premiership	6	0	0	0	0	0	0	0	6	0
Kilmarnock	2019–20	Scottish Premiership	2	0	0	0	0	0	0	0	2	0
Morecambe	2020–21	EFL League Two	36	1	3	0	3	0	3	0	45	1
Partick Thistle	2021–22	Scottish Championship	13	0	3	0	0	0	3	0	19	0
Queen of the South	2022–23	Scottish League One	30	1	0	0	1	0	4	0	35	1
Hamilton Academical	2023–24	Scottish League One	16	0	0	0	4	0	3	0	23	0
Hamilton Academical	2024–25	Scottish Championship	26	0	4	1	4	0	0	0	34	1
Hamilton Academical	2025–26	Scottish League One	30	1	1	0	4	0	5	0	40	1
Hamilton Academical	2026–27	Scottish League One	16	1	0	0	4	0	2	0	22	1
Hamilton Academical	Total		88	2	5	1	16	0	10	0	119	3
Career total			315	5	20	1	31	0	31	0	397	6
