= Fergus Owens =

Scottish footballer (born 2003)

Personal information
- Date of birth: 12 May 2003 (age 23)
- Height: 6 ft 2 in (1.88 m)
- Position: Defender

Team information
- Current team: Hamilton Academical
- Number: 5

Youth career
- Hamilton Academical

Senior career*
Years	Team	Apps	(Gls)
2021–2026	Hamilton Academical	28	(0)
2021	→ Clydebank (loan)	2	(0)
2021–2022	→ Bo'ness Athletic (loan)		
2022	→ Blackburn United (loan)		
2023–2024	→ Kelty Hearts (loan)	10	(1)
2026	Greenock Morton	9	(0)
2026–	Hamilton Academical	8	(0)
- * Club domestic league appearances and goals as of 09:26, 22 November 2026 (UTC)

Fergus Owens (born 12 May 2003) is a Scottish professional footballer who plays for Hamilton Academical, as a defender.

== Club career ==
Owens began his career with Hamilton Academical, moving on loan to Clydebank in July 2021, where he made two league appearances. Later that season he also spent time on loan at Bo'ness Athletic and Blackburn United.

He spent the first half of the 2023–24 season on loan with Kelty Hearts. He was recalled in January 2024 following impressive performances, and signed a new two-year contract with Hamilton in April 2024.

In January 2026, days after being close to a transfer to East Kilbride, he signed for Greenock Morton, saying that he was hoping to revive his career. The transfer was welcomed by Greenock player Jackson Longridge, who had played with Owens at Hamilton. Owens made a notable mistake in a game in March, but later that month praised the club's fighting spirit as they challenged relegation.

In May 2026 he left Greenock, and in June 2026, Owens returned to Hamilton.

== International career ==
Owens is eligible to play for Ireland through his mother, and in May 2024 was reported to be close to being called up by their under-21 team.

== Personal life ==
His father is musician Campbell Owens.
