= Connor Smith (footballer, born 2002) =

Scottish footballer

Personal information
- Full name: Connor Smith
- Date of birth: 1 February 2002 (age 24)
- Place of birth: Cowdenbeath, Scotland
- Height: 1.76 m (5 ft 9 in)
- Position: Midfielder

Team information
- Current team: Airdrieonians
- Number: 16

Youth career
- –2018: Heart of Midlothian

Senior career*
Years	Team	Apps	(Gls)
2018–2024	Heart of Midlothian	11	(0)
2019–2020	→ Cowdenbeath (loan)	15	(2)
2020–2021	→ Arbroath (loan)	3	(0)
2021	→ Cove Rangers (loan)	10	(0)
2021–2022	→ Queen's Park (loan)	29	(4)
2023	→ Hamilton Academical (loan)	15	(5)
2023–2024	→ Scunthorpe United (loan)	16	(6)
2024–2025	St Johnstone	11	(1)
2024–2025	→ Hamilton Academical (loan)	14	(2)
2025–2026	Hamilton Academical	30	(6)
2026	Scunthorpe United	14	(0)
2026–	Airdrieonians	4	(0)

International career^{‡}
2017–2018	Scotland U16	8	(2)
2018–2019	Scotland U17	10	(0)
2019	Scotland U18	2	(0)
2022–2023	Scotland U21	9	(0)
- * Club domestic league appearances and goals as of 20:12, 14 October 2026 (UTC) ‡ National team caps and goals as of 19:04, 8 November 2023 (UTC)

Connor Smith (born 1 February 2002) is a Scottish professional footballer who plays as a midfielder for Scottish League One side Airdrieonians.

== Club career ==
Born in Cowdenbeath, Smith made his senior debut for Heart of Midlothian on 13 May 2018, in a 1–0 league defeat away at Kilmarnock. He was one of four Hearts youth players to make their debuts in that match, alongside Chris Hamilton, Cammy Logan, and Leeroy Makovora. Smith was subsequently loaned to Cowdenbeath, Arbroath, Cove Rangers and Queen's Park.

He moved on loan to Hamilton Academical in January 2023. On 1 September 2023, Smith joined National League North side Scunthorpe United on loan for the 23/24 campaign.

On 26 January 2024, Smith signed for Scottish Premiership club St Johnstone on a contract until May 2025.

In September 2024, Smith returned on loan to Hamilton Academical. The loan was made permanent in January 2025.

In January 2026 he signed for English club Scunthorpe United on a two-and-a-half year contract. On 4 September 2026, Smith departed the club by mutual consent.

On 10 September 2026, Smith joined Scottish League One side Airdrieonians.

== International career ==
Smith has represented Scotland at under-16, under-17, under-18 and under-21 youth levels.

== Personal life ==
Smith attended the SFA performance school at Broughton High School, Edinburgh.

His older brother Callum is also a footballer – they came up against one another in the Scottish Championship Promotion play-off final in both the 2021–22 (Queen's Park, with Connor on loan and among the scorers, defeated Callum's Airdrie) and 2022–23 seasons (Airdrie overcame Hamilton aided by a goal from Callum in the first leg against his former club; Connor levelled the tie for the opposition in the return, and the outcome was settled on penalties).

== Career statistics ==
As of 27 December 2025

Appearances and goals by club, season and competition
Club	Season	League			National Cup		League Cup		Other		Total	
Club	Season	Division	Apps	Goals	Apps	Goals	Apps	Goals	Apps	Goals	Apps	Goals
Heart of Midlothian	2017–18	Scottish Premiership	1	0	0	0	0	0	0	0	1	0
Heart of Midlothian	2018–19	Scottish Premiership	3	0	0	0	0	0	0	0	3	0
Heart of Midlothian	2019–20	Scottish Premiership	0	0	0	0	0	0	0	0	0	0
Heart of Midlothian	2020–21	Scottish Championship	0	0	0	0	0	0	0	0	0	0
Heart of Midlothian	2021–22	Scottish Premiership	0	0	0	0	2	0	0	0	2	0
Heart of Midlothian	2022–23	Scottish Premiership	7	0	0	0	1	0	5 (Note: Appearances in the UEFA Europa League)	0	13	0
Heart of Midlothian	2023–24	Scottish Premiership	0	0	0	0	0	0	0	0	0	0
Heart of Midlothian	Total		11	0	0	0	3	0	5	0	19	0
Cowdenbeath (loan)	2019–20	Scottish League Two	15	2	0	0	0	0	0	0	15	2
Arbroath (loan)	2020–21	Scottish Championship	3	0	0	0	4	0	0	0	7	0
Cove Rangers (loan)	2020–21	Scottish League One	10	0	1	0	0	0	1 (Note: Appearance(s) in the play-offs)	0	12	0
Queen's Park (loan)	2021–22	Scottish League One	29	4	1	0	0	0	4	1	34	5
Hamilton Academical (loan)	2022–23	Scottish Championship	15	5	0	0	0	0	4	1	19	6
Scunthorpe United (loan)	2023–24	National League North	16	6	0	0	0	0	2 (Note: Appearances in the FA Trophy)	1	18	7
St Johnstone	2023–24	Scottish Premiership	11	1	0	0	0	0	—		11	1
St Johnstone	2024–25	Scottish Premiership	0	0	0	0	2	0	—		2	0
St Johnstone	Total		11	1	0	0	2	0	0	0	13	1
Hamilton Academical (loan)	2024–25	Scottish Championship	14	2	1	0	—		—		15	2
Hamilton Academical	2024–25	Scottish Championship	11	0	2	0	—		—		13	0
Hamilton Academical	2025–26	Scottish League One	19	6	1	0	4	1	3	1	28	7
Hamilton Academical	Total		30	6	3	0	4	1	3	1	41	7
Scunthorpe United	2025–26	National League	0	0	0	0	0	0	0	0	0	0
Career total			154	26	6	0	13	1	19	3	193	30
