= Ben Williamson (Scottish footballer) =

Scottish footballer (born 2001)

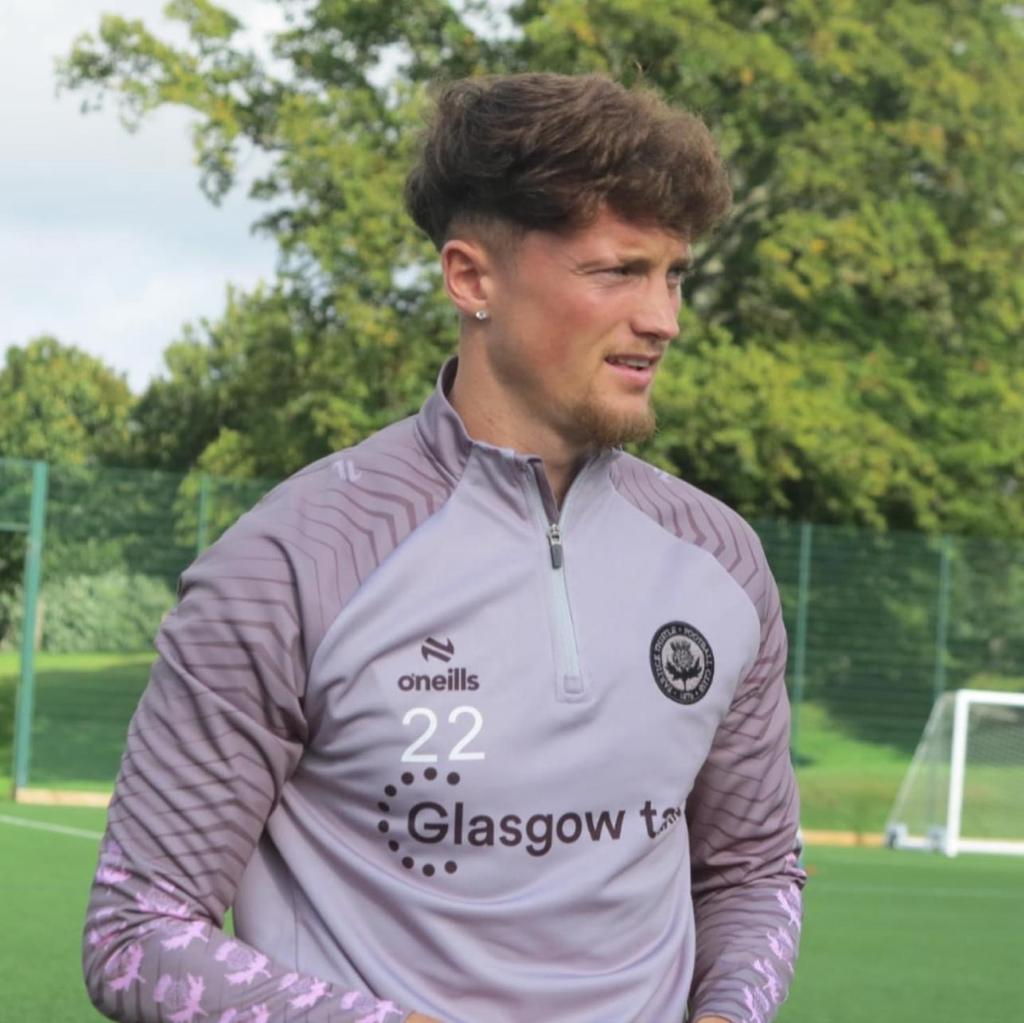
- Williamson on loan with Partick Thistle in 2023

Personal information
- Date of birth: 7 August 2001 (age 25)
- Place of birth: Blairhall, Fife, Scotland
- Position: Midfielder

Team information
- Current team: Oakley United

Youth career
- Rangers

Senior career*
Years	Team	Apps	(Gls)
2020–2024	Rangers	0	(0)
2021	→ Arbroath (loan)	17	(1)
2021–2022	→ Livingston (loan)	5	(0)
2022	→ Raith Rovers (loan)	14	(2)
2022–2023	→ Dundee (loan)	24	(1)
2023	→ Partick Thistle (loan)	7	(0)
2024–2025	Hamilton Academical	25	(1)
2026	East Kilbride	2	(0)
2026–	Oakley United		
- * Club domestic league appearances and goals as of 18:11, 1 June 2026 (UTC)

Ben Williamson (born 7 August 2001) is a Scottish footballer, who plays as a midfielder for East of Scotland League First Division club Oakley United.

== Career ==
=== Rangers ===
In January 2020, Williamson, a product of the Rangers youth system, signed a new contract with the club extending his stay until the summer of 2021.

==== Arbroath (loan) ====
On 13 January 2021, Williamson joined Arbroath in the Scottish Championship, after agreeing a one-year contract extension until 2022. Williamson made his professional debut three days later in a draw with Queen of the South.

==== Loans to Livingston and Raith ====
On 12 July 2021, Williamson signed a new two-year contract with Rangers and then moved to Livingston on a season-long loan. This loan was cut short in January 2022, and Williamson was immediately sent on loan to Scottish Championship side Raith Rovers for the remainder of the season.

==== Dundee (loan) ====
On 15 July 2022, Williamson signed an extension with Rangers which kept him at the club until 2024, and then joined Scottish Championship side Dundee on a season-long loan. He made his debut for the Dark Blues in an away win over Stranraer in the Scottish League Cup. Williamson scored his first goal for Dundee in a 3–0 win over league leaders Queen's Park on 28 January 2023. Williamson came on as a substitute and help seal a win on the final day of the league season over Queen's Park which clinched the Scottish Championship title for Dundee.

==== Partick Thistle (loan) ====
On 18 July 2023, Williamson joined Scottish Championship club Partick Thistle on a loan until January 2024. He made his first start later that same day in a Scottish League Cup group stage win away to Dundee United. Williamson left the club at the end of his loan on 1 January 2024.

=== Hamilton Academical ===
On 4 January 2024, Williamson joined Scottish League One club Hamilton Academical on an 18-month deal. He made his debut on 13 January in a home league win over Cove Rangers, in which he was sent off. Williamson was a large part of Hamilton's play-off final victory over Inverness Caledonian Thistle which saw Accies promoted to the Scottish Championship.

In December 2024, Williamson was involved in a car crash in which he sustained serious injuries, including a broken leg, which would end his football season.

=== East Kilbride ===
In the summer of 2025, with Hamilton Accies being given a transfer-embargo and Williamson's contract having expired, he was unable to re-register with the club but continued to train with them. In January 2026, he joined Scottish League Two side East Kilbride. After making just 2 appearances for East Kilbride, Williamson announced his departure from the club, citing a need to take time away from professional football for personal reasons.

=== Oakley United ===
Shortly after his departure from East Kilbride, it was announced that Williamson had signed for Oakley United in the East of Scotland Football League Second Division in February 2026. Williamson would play a role in helping get promotion from the 2025–26 EoSFL Second Division into the First Division.

== Career statistics ==
As of 24 January 2026

Appearances and goals by club, season and competition
Club	Season	League			Scottish Cup		League Cup		Other		Total	
Club	Season	Division	Apps	Goals	Apps	Goals	Apps	Goals	Apps	Goals	Apps	Goals
Rangers	2020–21	Scottish Premiership	0	0	0	0	0	0	0	0	0	0
Rangers	2021–22	Scottish Premiership	0	0	0	0	0	0	0	0	0	0
Rangers	Total		0	0	0	0	0	0	0	0	0	0
Arbroath (loan)	2020–21	Scottish Championship	17	1	0	0	0	0	0	0	17	1
Livingston (loan)	2021–22	Scottish Premiership	5	0	0	0	2	0	0	0	7	0
Raith Rovers (loan)	2021–22	Scottish Championship	14	2	2	0	0	0	1 (Note: Appearances in the Scottish Challenge Cup)	0	17	2
Dundee (loan)	2022–23	Scottish Championship	24	1	1	0	4	0	2	0	31	1
Partick Thistle (loan)	2023–24	Scottish Championship	7	0	1	0	4	0	0	0	12	0
Hamilton Academical	2023–24	Scottish League One	13	1	0	0	0	0	4 (Note: Appearance(s) in the Scottish Championship play-offs)	0	17	1
Hamilton Academical	2024–25	Scottish Championship	12	0	0	0	2	0	1	0	15	0
Hamilton Academical	Total		25	1	0	0	2	0	5	0	32	1
East Kilbride	2025–26	Scottish League Two	2	0	–		–		0	0	2	0
Career total			94	5	4	0	12	0	7	0	118	5

== Honours ==
Dundee

- Scottish Championship: 2022–23

Hamilton Academical

- Scottish Championship play-off winners: 2023–24
