= Blackburn Athletic F.C. =

Former association football club in Scotland

Blackburn Athletic Football Club were formed in 1932 and played at Murrayfield Park, Blackburn, West Lothian.

They joined the Midlothian Junior League and in their second season as members (1933–34) won the League Championship, as well as the Marshall Cup and sharing the Rosebery Charity Cup. They were the first West Lothian club to win the Midlothian Junior League.

Due to their poor financial state, the club folded during the 1936–37 season.

Their most famous player was goalkeeper Tommy "Chick" Farr who signed for the club in August 1933 and a year later moved to English Second Division side Bradford Park Avenue, and in his 16-year career with them made over 500 appearances.
