= Stuart McKinstry =

Scottish footballer

Personal information
- Full name: Stuart Adamson McKinstry
- Date of birth: 18 September 2002 (age 24)
- Place of birth: Wishaw, Scotland
- Height: 5 ft 10 in (1.79 m)
- Position: Winger

Team information
- Current team: Hamilton Academical
- Number: 27

Youth career
- –2019: Motherwell
- 2019–2021: Leeds United

Senior career*
Years	Team	Apps	(Gls)
2021–2023	Leeds United	1	(0)
2022–2023	→ Motherwell (loan)	21	(4)
2023–2024	Queen's Park	20	(1)
2024–	Hamilton Academical	54	(5)

International career
2019	Scotland U17	4	(1)
- * Club domestic league appearances and goals as of 4 May 2026

Stuart Adamson McKinstry (born 18 September 2002) is a Scottish professional footballer who plays as a winger for Scottish League One club Hamilton Academical.

Born in Wishaw, McKinstry is a product of Motherwell's academy. He moved to Leeds United in the summer of 2019, making his senior debut in 2021. In 2022 he returned to his boyhood club Motherwell on a one-year loan.

== Club career ==
=== Motherwell ===
Born in Wishaw, McKinstry supported Motherwell as a child, with both of his parents being Motherwell fans. He joined Motherwell's academy aged 10, and progressed to the first-team, appearing in the matchday squad as an unused substitute for a 1–0 defeat to Kilmarnock on 26 December 2018.

=== Leeds United ===
McKinstry joined Leeds United's academy in summer 2019, and signed a professional contract with the club in September 2019, with the contract valid until 2022. In August 2020, he signed a new contract with the club, valid until summer of 2023. He made his first-team debut as a substitute in a 0–0 EFL Cup draw with Fulham on 21 September 2021, with McKinstry scoring the winning penalty as Leeds won the penalty shoot-out 6–5. McKinstry made his Premier League debut for Leeds on 21 November 2021 as a second-half substitute in the 2–1 defeat to Tottenham Hotspur. On 13 June 2023, Leeds United announced that McKinstry's contract would not be extended at the end of the 2022–23 season.

==== Motherwell loan ====
On 17 August 2022, Motherwell announced the return of McKinstry to the club, on a season-long loan deal from Leeds United. McKinstry scored goals in consecutive games against Rangers and Aberdeen respectively. McKinstry scored his third goal for the club coming off the bench against Hibs and also scored a fourth Motherwell goal against Ross County.

=== Queen's Park ===
On 3 October 2023, McKinstry joined Scottish Championship club Queen's Park on a contract until the end of the season.

=== Hamilton Academical ===
On 28 October 2024, McKinstry joined Scottish Championship side Hamilton Academical.

== International career ==
McKinstry has represented Scotland internationally at the under-17 level.

== Style of play ==
McKinstry plays as a winger.

== Career statistics ==
As of match played 22 November 2025

Appearances and goals by club, season and competition
Club	Season	League			National cup		League cup		Other		Total	
Club	Season	Division	Apps	Goals	Apps	Goals	Apps	Goals	Apps	Goals	Apps	Goals
Leeds United U21	2020–21	—			—		—		2 (Note: Appearance(s) in Scottish Challenge Cup)	0	2	0
Leeds United U21	2021–22	—			—		—		2	0	2	0
Leeds United U21	Total		—		—		—		4	0	4	0
Leeds United	2021–22	Premier League	1	0	0	0	1	0	—		2	0
Leeds United	2022–23	Premier League	0	0	0	0	0	0	—		0	0
Leeds United	Total		1	0	0	0	1	0	—		2	0
Motherwell (loan)	2022–23	Scottish Premiership	21	4	2	0	2	0	—		25	4
Queen's Park	2023–24	Scottish Championship	20	1	1	0	—		0	0	21	1
Hamilton Academical	2024–25	Scottish Championship	19	3	3	0	—		—		22	3
Hamilton Academical	2025–26	Scottish League One	15	1	0	0	4	0	5	2	24	3
Hamilton Academical	Total		34	4	3	0	4	0	5	2	46	6
Career total			76	9	6	0	7	0	9	2	98	11
