= Oli Shaw =

Scottish footballer

Personal information
- Full name: Oliver Glen Shaw
- Date of birth: 12 March 1998 (age 28)
- Place of birth: Edinburgh, Scotland
- Height: 6 ft 2 in (1.88 m)
- Position: Striker

Team information
- Current team: Dunfermline Athletic
- Number: 10

Youth career
- Heart of Midlothian
- 2013–2016: Hibernian

Senior career*
Years	Team	Apps	(Gls)
2016–2020	Hibernian	46	(10)
2016–2017	→ Stenhousemuir (loan)	24	(7)
2020–2021	Ross County	33	(6)
2021–2023	Kilmarnock	41	(14)
2023–2024	Barnsley	7	(0)
2023–2024	→ Motherwell (loan)	19	(0)
2024–2026	Hamilton Academical	68	(30)
2026–	Dunfermline Athletic	8	(0)

International career
2016–2017	Scotland U19	7	(2)
2018–2019	Scotland U21	3	(0)
- * Club domestic league appearances and goals as of 19:53, 24 October 2026 (UTC)

Oliver Glen Shaw (born 12 March 1998) is a Scottish professional footballer who plays as a striker for Scottish Championship club Dunfermline Athletic.

He has previously played for Hibernian, Stenhousemuir, Ross County, Kilmarnock, Barnsley, Motherwell and Hamilton Academical. Shaw represented Scotland at under-19 and under-21 levels.

== Early life ==
Shaw is from the Barnton area of Edinburgh, and although a Hibernian fan, he initially joined local rivals Heart of Midlothian as a youth player before signing for Hibernian. His father is retired footballer Greg Shaw, who played for Ayr United, Falkirk, Dunfermline Athletic, Airdrieonians, Clydebank and Berwick Rangers.

== Club career ==
=== Hibernian ===
After establishing himself in the Hibernian youth team squad, he made his first team debut for the club in a Scottish League Cup match against Montrose on 1 August 2015, which Hibernian won 3–0. Having passed his driving test the same day, he was included as a substitute by then-manager Alan Stubbs, and replaced Alex Harris in the 75th minute.

Shaw was sent to Scottish League One side Stenhousemuir on a development loan for the 2016–17 season. He also continued to play for the Hibs development team and was the top goalscorer in the 2016–17 SPFL Development League.

Shaw scored his first goal for the Hibs first team on 22 October 2017, in a 4–2 defeat against Celtic in the 2017–18 Scottish League Cup semi-final. He scored his first league game for Hibs on 10 December, also against Celtic. In January 2018, Shaw signed a contract with Hibs that was due to run until the end of the 2020–21 season. He continued to play for the Hibs under-20 team, and was again the top goalscorer in the Development League in 2017–18.

Shaw struggled to get playing time during 2019, with his last start for Hibs coming in February 2019. He was sold to Ross County in January 2020 for an undisclosed fee.

=== Kilmarnock ===
On 31 August 2021, Shaw joined Kilmarnock on a two-year deal, signing for an undisclosed fee.

After a good start in front of goal for Kilmarnock, he won the Scottish Championship player of the Month award for October 2021 having scored five goals in five games in the league that month.

=== Barnsley ===
On 31 January 2023, Shaw joined Barnsley on a two-and-a-half-year deal for an undisclosed fee.. On 31 August 2023, Shaw joined Motherwell on loan until the end of the 23/24 season.

=== Hamilton Academical ===
On 1 July 2024, Shaw joined Scottish Championship side Hamilton Academical on a three-year deal.

== International career ==
Shaw scored for the Scotland under-19s against Sweden on 4 October 2016 in a warm-up game ahead of qualification for the 2017 UEFA European Under-19 Championship. Scotland were drawn against Israel, Andorra and Liechtenstein in Group C of the qualification tournament, and progressed to the Elite qualifying stage after finishing second in the group. With all three matches being played in Andorra over 6 days from 25 October 2016, Shaw scored the only goal of the game against Liechtenstein and also featured in the matches against Andorra and Israel. Shaw was added to the Scotland under-21 squad in August 2018.

== Career statistics ==
As of match played 9 November 2024

Club	Season	League			National cup (Note: Includes Scottish Cup)		League cup (Note: Includes Scottish League Cup, EFL Cup)		Other		Total	
Club	Season	Division	Apps	Goals	Apps	Goals	Apps	Goals	Apps	Goals	Apps	Goals
Hibernian	2015–16	Scottish Championship	0	0	0	0	1	0	0	0	1	0
Hibernian	2016–17	Scottish Championship	0	0	0	0	0	0	0	0	0	0
Hibernian	2017–18	Scottish Premiership	16	4	1	0	4	1	—		21	5
Hibernian	2018–19 (Note: Soccerbase did not record appearances made by Shaw against NSI Runavik on 19 July and Molde on 9 August and 16 August 2018.)	Scottish Premiership	26	6	3	0	2	0	4 (Note: Appearances in UEFA Europa League)	1	35	7
Hibernian	2019–20	Scottish Premiership	4	0	0	0	4	0	—		8	0
Hibernian	Total		46	10	4	0	11	1	4	1	65	12
Stenhousemuir (loan)	2016–17	Scottish League One	24	7	1	0	0	0	0	0	25	7
Hibernian Under-20s	2017–18	—	—		—		—		1 (Note: Appearance(s) in Scottish Challenge Cup)	0	1	0
Hibernian Under-20s	2018–19	—	—		—		—		1	1	1	1
Hibernian Under-20s	Total		0	0	0	0	0	0	2	1	2	1
Ross County	2019–20	Scottish Premiership	7	0	0	0	0	0	—		7	0
Ross County	2020–21	Scottish Premiership	25	6	1	0	5	2	—		31	8
Ross County	2021–22	Scottish Premiership	1	0	0	0	2	0	—		3	0
Ross County	Total		33	6	1	0	7	2	0	0	48	8
Kilmarnock	2021–22	Scottish Championship	29	14	2	0	0	0	4	2	35	16
Kilmarnock	2022–23	Scottish Premiership	12	0	0	0	4	4	–		16	4
Kilmarnock	Total		41	14	2	0	4	4	4	2	51	20
Barnsley	2022–23	League One	4	0	0	0	0	0	0	0	4	0
Barnsley	2023–24	League One	3	0	0	0	1	0	0	0	4	0
Barnsley	Total		7	0	0	0	1	0	0	0	8	0
Motherwell	2023–24	Scottish Premiership	19	0	0	0	0	0	–		19	0
Hamilton Academical	2024–25	Scottish Championship	12	7	0	0	4	1	2	1	18	9
Career total			182	44	8	0	27	8	12	5	229	57
