= Chick Farr =

Scottish footballer

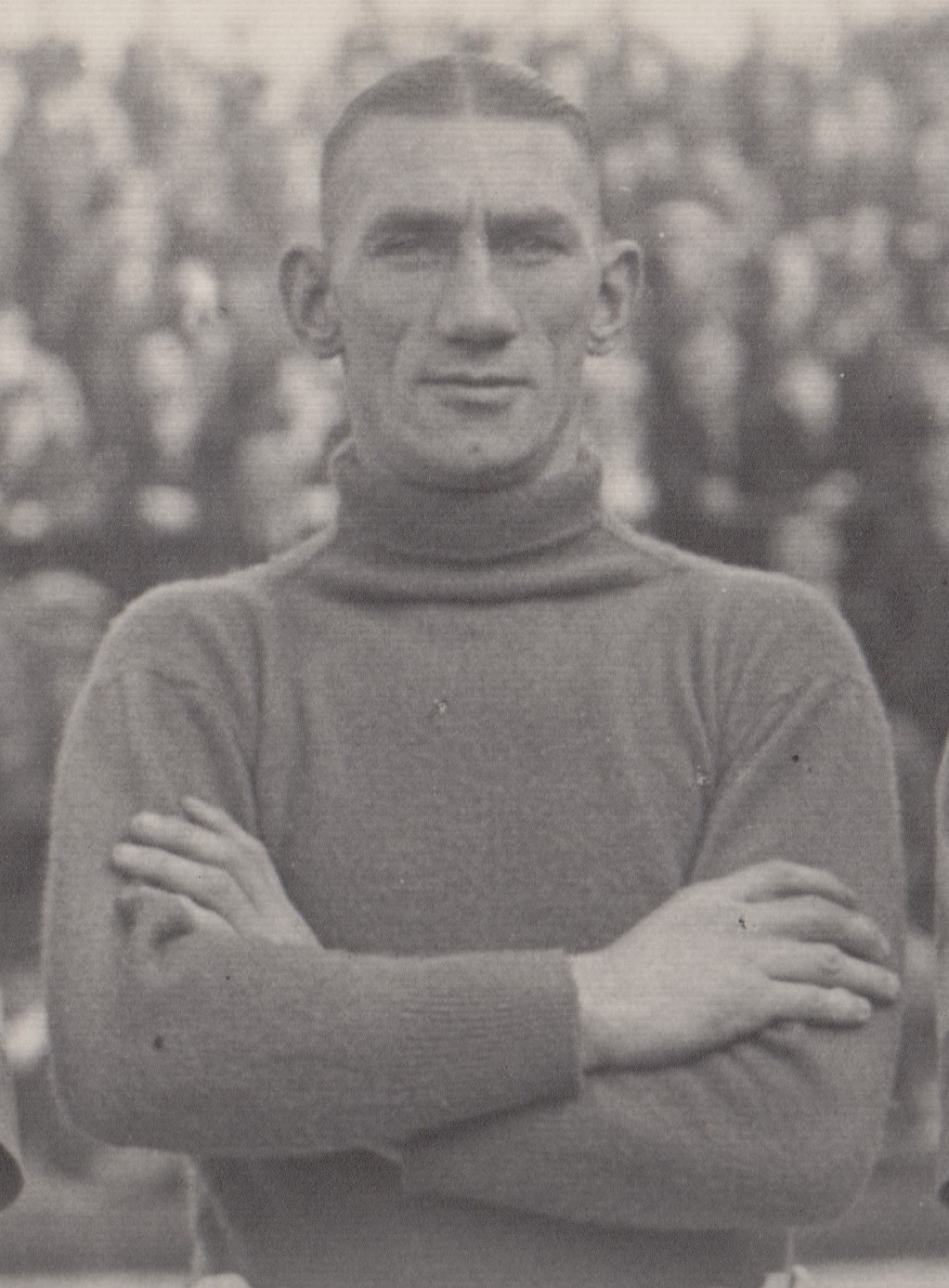
- Portrait of Chick Farr

Personal information
- Full name: Thomas Francis Farr
- Date of birth: 19 February 1914
- Date of death: 15 June 1980 (aged 66)
- Height: 5 ft 10 1/2 in (1.79 m)
- Position: Goalkeeper

Senior career*
Years	Team	Apps	(Gls)
- Blackburn Athletic
- Bradford Park Avenue
- * Club domestic league appearances and goals

Thomas Francis "Chick" Farr (19 February 1914 – 15 June 1980) was a British professional footballer who played as a goalkeeper for Blackburn Athletic and Bradford Park Avenue.
