= Barry Maguire (footballer, born 1998) =

Scottish footballer

Personal information
- Full name: Barry Paul Maguire
- Date of birth: 27 April 1998 (age 28)
- Place of birth: Bellshill, Scotland
- Positions: Midfielder; defender

Team information
- Current team: East Kilbride
- Number: 15

Youth career
- 2014–2017: Motherwell

Senior career*
Years	Team	Apps	(Gls)
2017–2024	Motherwell	59	(1)
2018–2019	→ Queen of the South (loan)	15	(1)
2023	→ Dundee (loan)	11	(0)
2023–2024	→ Kidderminster Harriers (loan)	14	(0)
2024–2026	Hamilton Academical	34	(0)
2026–	East Kilbride	2	(0)

International career^{‡}
2019–2020	Scotland U21	8	(2)
- * Club domestic league appearances and goals as of 18 October 2026 ‡ National team caps and goals as of 16:29, 24 October 2020 (UTC)

Barry Paul Maguire (born 27 April 1998) is a Scottish professional footballer who plays as a midfielder for Scottish League One side East Kilbride. Maguire is a product of the Motherwell Academy and spent the second half of the 2018–19 season on loan at Queen of the South. He broke into the Motherwell first team over the next few seasons, before going on loan in the second half of the 2022–23 season on loan at Dundee, with whom he would win the Scottish Championship. Maguire also spent time on loan with English side Kidderminster Harriers. After leaving Motherwell, Maguire joined their local rivals Hamilton Academical for two seasons amid their financial issues.

== Club career ==
=== Motherwell ===
On 7 April 2018, Maguire debuted for Motherwell, playing 73 minutes in a 0–0 draw away to St Johnstone.

On 26 June 2018, Maguire signed a new one-year contract with the Steelmen until the end of the 2018–19 season.

On 5 January 2022, Maguire signed a new contract with Motherwell, keeping him at the club until the summer of 2024.

==== Queen of the South (loan) ====
On 1 January 2019, Maguire signed a loan deal with Dumfries club Queen of the South until 31 May 2019. On 16 February 2019, Maguire was sent-off after conceding a penalty in the 40th minute of a league match versus Dundee United at Palmerston. The Doonhamers lost the match 1–0 as Nicky Clark subsequently converted the spot-kick.

==== Dundee (loan) ====
On 26 January 2023, Maguire joined Scottish Championship club Dundee on loan until the end of the season. He would make his debut and first start two days later in a 3–0 victory over league leaders Queen's Park. Maguire would start the majority of games for Dundee after coming in and would help the Dark Blues clinch the Scottish Championship title at the end of the season.

==== Kidderminster Harriers (loan) ====
On 18 August 2023, Maguire joined Kidderminster Harriers on loan until January 2024. Maguire returned to his parent club at the end of the loan deal.

In May 2024, Motherwell confirmed that Maguire would depart the club upon the expiry of his contract.

=== Hamilton Academical ===
On 12 June 2024, Maguire joined Motherwell's local rivals and Scottish Championship club Hamilton Academical on a permanent deal. Maguire made his competitive debut for Accies on 16 July in a Scottish League Cup group stage game against Stirling Albion. After two seasons with Accies, the club announced on 24 July 2026 that Maguire had departed the club after the expiry of his contract.

=== East Kilbride ===
On 18 September 2026, Maguire signed a short-term deal with Scottish League One side East Kilbride.

== International career ==
In March 2019, Maguire debuted for the Scotland under-21 team against Mexico under-22s. He scored his first goal at under-21 level on 25 March 2019, against Sweden.

== Career statistics ==
As of match played 27 August 2025

Appearances and goals by club, season and competition
Club	Season	League			National cup		League cup		Continental		Other		Total	
Club	Season	Division	Apps	Goals	Apps	Goals	Apps	Goals	Apps	Goals	Apps	Goals	Apps	Goals
Motherwell	2016–17	Scottish Premiership	0	0	0	0	0	0	–		–		0	0
Motherwell	2017–18	Scottish Premiership	3	0	0	0	0	0	–		–		3	0
Motherwell	2018–19	Scottish Premiership	2	0	0	0	0	0	–		–		2	0
Motherwell	2019–20	Scottish Premiership	7	0	0	0	2	0	–		–		9	0
Motherwell	2020–21	Scottish Premiership	24	1	2	0	0	0	2 (Note: Appearances in the UEFA Europa League)	0	–		28	1
Motherwell	2021–22	Scottish Premiership	13	0	1	0	5	1	–		–		19	1
Motherwell	2022–23	Scottish Premiership	10	0	0	0	2	0	2 (Note: Appearances in the UEFA Europa Conference League)	0	–		14	0
Motherwell	2023–24	Scottish Premiership	0	0	0	0	3	0	–		–		3	0
Motherwell	Total		59	1	2	0	10	1	2	0	0	0	78	2
Motherwell U20	2016–17	SPFL Reserve League	–		–		–		–		2 (Note: Appearances in the Scottish Challenge Cup)	0	2	0
Motherwell U20	2018–19	SPFL Reserve League	–		–		–		–		4	0	4	0
Motherwell U20	Total		0	0	0	0	0	0	0	0	6	0	6	0
Queen of the South (loan)	2018–19	Scottish Championship	15	1	3	0	0	0	–		2	0	20	1
Dundee (loan)	2022–23	Scottish Championship	11	0	–		–		–		1	0	12	0
Kidderminster Harriers (loan)	2023–24	National League	14	0	2	0	–		–		1 (Note: Appearances in FA Trophy)	0	17	0
Hamilton Academical	2024–25	Scottish Championship	29	0	3	0	4	0	–		2	0	38	0
Hamilton Academical	2025–26	Scottish League One	4	0	0	0	2	0	–		2	0	8	0
Hamilton Academical	Total		33	0	3	0	6	0	0	0	4	0	46	0
Career total			132	2	10	0	16	1	2	0	14	0	179	3

== Honours ==
Dundee

- Scottish Championship: 2022–23
