= Tony Gallacher =

Scottish footballer (born 1999)

Personal information
- Full name: Antony Paul Gallacher
- Date of birth: 23 July 1999 (age 27)
- Place of birth: Glasgow, Scotland
- Height: 5 ft 10 in (1.79 m)
- Position: Left back

Team information
- Current team: Hamilton Academical
- Number: 3

Youth career
- 2009–2015: Falkirk
- 2014–2015: → Forth Valley Academy

Senior career*
Years	Team	Apps	(Gls)
2015–2018	Falkirk	17	(0)
2018–2022	Liverpool	0	(0)
2020	→ Toronto FC (loan)	10	(0)
2022–2024	St Johnstone	31	(1)
2025–	Hamilton Academical	33	(0)

International career
2014	Scotland U16	3	(0)
2015–2016	Scotland U17	6	(0)
2017	Scotland U19	5	(0)
- * Club domestic league appearances and goals as of 4 May 2026

Antony Paul Gallacher (born 23 July 1999) is a Scottish professional footballer who plays as a left back for Scottish League One club Hamilton Academical.

== Club career ==
=== Falkirk ===
Gallacher joined Falkirk as a graduate from the Forth Valley Football Academy in the summer of 2015, having played for the club's youth teams since the age of 10. He made his debut as a sixteen-year-old in a Scottish Cup tie at home to Fraserburgh on 28 November 2015. He made his first league start in a Scottish Championship match against Dumbarton on 17 December 2016.

In January 2017, he was named as one of the Daily Record's and The Herald's Scottish footballing prospects for 2017. The latter reported that Gallacher had been scouted by Premier League sides Manchester United and Stoke City, as well as Scottish club Rangers.

=== Liverpool ===
On 25 January 2018, Liverpool signed Gallacher after a successful trial for a fee of £200,000. Gallacher made his competitive debut for Liverpool on 17 December 2019, starting in a 5–0 League Cup defeat at Aston Villa. Liverpool had decided to play a shadow team in that match due to a scheduling clash with the 2019 FIFA Club World Cup. He featured primarily with the Liverpool U23s in the Premier League 2 U23 league.

=== Toronto FC ===
On 14 September 2020, Gallacher joined Canadian club Toronto FC in Major League Soccer, on a loan until 31 December 2020. Due to the COVID-19 pandemic, he first had to complete a 14-day quarantine, and then the club had to play out the rest of the season in the United States, due to Canadian travel restrictions, meaning Gallacher did not get to spend any time in Toronto, instead spending the entire time on the road.

=== St Johnstone ===
Gallacher signed for St Johnstone in January 2022, on a contract that was due to run until the summer of 2024.

=== Hamilton Academical ===
In January 2025 he signed for Hamilton Academical.

== International career ==
Gallacher has been involved with Scotland at various youth age group levels.

== Personal life ==
Gallacher is the nephew of Jim Gallacher and cousin of Paul Gallacher, both former goalkeepers.

== Career statistics ==
As of match played 1 March 2025

Appearances and goals by club, season and competition
Club	Season	League			National cup (Note: Includes Scottish Cup)		League cup (Note: Includes Scottish League Cup, EFL Cup)		Other		Total	
Club	Season	Division	Apps	Goals	Apps	Goals	Apps	Goals	Apps	Goals	Apps	Goals
Falkirk	2015–16	Scottish Championship	0	0	1	0	0	0	0	0	1	0
Falkirk	2016–17	Scottish Championship	6	0	1	0	0	0	1 (Note: Appearance(s) in the Scottish Challenge Cup.)	0	8	0
Falkirk	2017–18	Scottish Championship	11	0	0	0	5	0	1	0	17	0
Falkirk	Total		17	0	2	0	5	0	2	0	26	0
Liverpool U21	2019–20	—			—		—		2 (Note: Appearance(s) in the EFL Trophy.)	0	2	0
Liverpool	2019–20	Premier League	0	0	0	0	1	0	—		1	0
Toronto FC (loan)	2020	Major League Soccer	10	0	0	0	—		1 (Note: Appearance(s) in the MLS Cup Playoffs.)	0	10	0
St Johnstone	2021–22	Scottish Premiership	9	0	1	0	0	0	0	0	10	0
St Johnstone	2022–23	Scottish Premiership	5	0	0	0	0	0	0	0	5	0
St Johnstone	2023-24	Scottish Premiership	17	1	0	0	4	0	0	0	21	0
St Johnstone	Total		31	1	1	0	4	0	0	0	36	0
Hamilton Academical	2024-25	Scottish Championship	4	0	0	0	0	0	—		4	0
Career total			62	1	3	0	10	0	5	0	79	0
