= Lewis Latona =

Scottish footballer

Personal information
- Full name: Lewis Latona
- Date of birth: 4 September 2006 (age 20)
- Place of birth: Scotland
- Position: Midfielder

Team information
- Current team: Auchinleck Talbot

Youth career
- -2024: Hamilton Academical

Senior career*
Years	Team	Apps	(Gls)
2024-2025	Hamilton Academical	1	(0)
2024-2025	→ East Stirling (loan)		
2025-2026	Livingston	0	(0)
2025-2026	→ East Fife (loan)	2	(1)
2026-	Auchinleck Talbot	0	(0)
- * Club domestic league appearances and goals as of 22:04, 8 December 2021 (UTC) ‡ National team caps and goals as of 19:51, 2 September 2017 (UTC)

Lewis Latona (born 4 September 2006) is a Scottish professional footballer who plays for Auchinleck Talbot.

== Club career ==
Latona came through the youth academy at Hamilton Academical. He made his first team debut, coming on as a 44th minute substitute for Marley Redfern on 6 April 2024 in a 3-1 away win against Annan.

The midfielder attracted interest from several clubs in England in 2024, going on trial with Hull, but was not offered a permanent deal.

He had a spell on loan with East Stirling in 2024-2025.

Latona was offered a new deal to stay at New Douglas Park in June 2025, but opted to sign for Livingston. He was re-united with his former Accies coaches George Cairns and Brian Rice.

Shortly after signing for Livi, he joined East Fife on loan for the 2025-2026 season. Lewis scored his first East Fife goal away at Peterhead in the 4-1 defeat on first league 1 game of the season.

He left Livi in May 2026 following the expiration of his contract.

Following his release from Livi, Latona signed for Auchinleck Talbot.
