= 2022–23 Queen of the South F.C. season =

Queen of the South
2022–23 season
- Chairman: Billy Hewitson
- Manager: Willie Gibson; Grant Murray; Marvin Bartley
- Stadium: Palmerston Park
- Scottish League One: 5th
- Scottish Cup: Third round
- League Cup: Second round
- Challenge Cup: Sixth round
- Top goalscorer: League: Ruari Paton (22); All: Ruari Paton (25)
- Highest home attendance: 1,421 vs. Clyde, 30 July 2022
- Lowest home attendance: 880 vs. Kelty Hearts, 17 December 2022
- Average home league attendance: 1,090
Home colours	Away colours	Third colours

The 2022–23 season is Queen of the South's first season back in the third tier of Scottish football since they were promoted as champions from the Scottish Second Division at the end of the 2012-13 season, having spent the previous nine seasons in the Scottish Championship. Queens are also competing in the Challenge Cup, League Cup and the Scottish Cup.

== Summary ==
Queens finished fifth in Scottish League One in their first season back in Scottish Football's third tier since the 2012-13 season.

Queens reached the sixth round of the Challenge Cup, losing 2-1 after extra time to Hamilton Academical at New Douglas Park.

Queens reached the second round of the League Cup, losing 3-1 to Rangers at Ibrox Stadium.

Queens reached the third round of the Scottish Cup, losing 4-1 to Greenock Morton at Cappielow Park.

== Results and fixtures ==
Win Draw Loss Abandoned or Postponed

=== Preseason ===
21 June 2022 Friendly	Kilmarnock	1–0	Queen of the South	Kilmarnock
14:00	Murray	QOSFC Report		Stadium: Rugby Park; Attendance: Closed doors

29 June 2022 Friendly	Raith Rovers	1–2	Queen of the South	Kirkcaldy
19:45	Gullan (pen.)	QOSFC Report	Paton (pen.); Connelly	Stadium: Stark's Park

2 July 2022 Friendly	Hamilton Academical	1–3	Queen of the South	Hamilton
15:00	Winter	QOSFC Report	Murray; Paton; Connelly	Stadium: New Douglas Park

=== Scottish League One ===
30 July 2022 Match 1	Queen of the South	1–4	Clyde	Dumfries
15:00	Connelly 1' (red card) 85'; Paton (penalty missed) 81'	SPFL Report	Cunningham 16'; McDonald 43'; Allan 82'; Cameron 89'	Stadium: Palmerston Park; Attendance: 1,421; Referee: Lambie; Man of the Match: Connelly

6 August 2022 Match 2	Montrose	0–0	Queen of the South	Montrose
15:00	Webster (penalty missed) 34'	SPFL Report		Stadium: Links Park; Attendance: 573; Referee: Williams; Man of the Match: East

13 August 2022 Match 3	Queen of the South	1–1	Airdrieonians	Dumfries
15:00	Reilly 61'	SPFL Report	Gallagher 19'	Stadium: Palmerston Park; Attendance: 1,205; Referee: MacDermid; Man of the Match: Todd

20 August 2022 Match 4	Peterhead	1–4	Queen of the South	Peterhead
15:00	Gillies 2'	SPFL Report	Todd 34'; Murray 43', 90+6'; Paton 64'	Stadium: Balmoor Stadium; Attendance: 595; Referee: Stuart; Man of the Match: Todd

27 August 2022 Match 5	Falkirk	3–1	Queen of the South	Falkirk
15:00	Morrison 12'; Alegria 29'; Lawal 83'	SPFL Report	Paton 61' (pen.); P. McKay (red card) 84'	Stadium: Falkirk Stadium; Attendance: 3,884; Referee: Cook; Man of the Match: Paton

3 September 2022 Match 6	Queen of the South	0–2	Dunfermline Athletic	Dumfries
15:00	Paton (penalty missed) 53'	SPFL Report	Todorov 19'; Breen 45+2'	Stadium: Palmerston Park; Attendance: 1,175; Referee: Luke; Man of the Match: Todd

17 September 2022 Match 7	Queen of the South	4–1	Edinburgh	Dumfries
15:00	Paton 44', 85'; East 77'; Bange 80'	SPFL Report	Shanley 90+3' (pen.)	Stadium: Palmerston Park; Attendance: 975; Referee: Williams; Man of the Match: Paton

1 October 2022 Match 8	Queen of the South	1–1	Alloa Athletic	Dumfries
15:00	Reilly 42'	SPFL Report	MacIver 87'	Stadium: Palmerston Park; Attendance: 1,031; Referee: Scott; Man of the Match: Hendrie

8 October 2022 Match 9	Airdrieonians	3–3	Queen of the South	Airdrie
15:00	Gallagher 5'; Fordyce 14'; Smith 61'; Ballantyne (yellow card) 49' (yellow-red card) 78'	SPFL Report	Todd 3'; Cochrane 42'; Reilly 63'	Stadium: Excelsior Stadium; Attendance: 1,007; Referee: Stuart; Man of the Match: Todd

11 October 2022 Match 10	Kelty Hearts	1–0	Queen of the South	Kelty
19:45	Tidser 34'	SPFL Report		Stadium: New Central Park; Attendance: 548; Referee: Snedden; Man of the Match: Todd

15 October 2022 Match 11	Queen of the South	2–0	Peterhead	Dumfries
15:00	East 21'; Todd 65'	SPFL Report		Stadium: Palmerston Park; Attendance: 926; Referee: Duncan; Man of the Match: Currie

22 October 2022 Match 12	Clyde	1–2	Queen of the South	Hamilton
15:00	Cunningham 60'	SPFL Report	Paton 19'; Murray 84' (pen.)	Stadium: New Douglas Park; Attendance: 657; Referee: Newlands; Man of the Match: Paton

29 October 2022 Match 13	Queen of the South	1–3	Falkirk	Dumfries
15:00	Murray 64'	SPFL Report	Burrell 6', 21'; Kennedy 48'	Stadium: Palmerston Park; Attendance: 1,366; Referee: Luke; Man of the Match: Murray

5 November 2022 Match 14	Edinburgh	0–3	Queen of the South	Edinburgh
15:00		SPFL Report	Murray (penalty missed) 11'; L. Gibson 45+1'; Paton 53'; Connelly 82'	Stadium: Meadowbank Stadium; Attendance: 598; Referee: Cook; Man of the Match: L. Gibson

12 November 2022 Match 15	Alloa Athletic	5–1	Queen of the South	Alloa
15:00	MacIver 44'; Church 62'; Stanger 65'; Offord 67'; King 84'	SPFL Report	Reilly 2'; Hendrie (red card) 86'	Stadium: Indodrill Stadium; Attendance: 708; Referee: Aitken; Man of the Match: Reilly

19 November 2022 Match 16	Queen of the South	4–0	Montrose	Dumfries
15:00	Paton 5', 33'; Reilly 54'; Todd 62'; Quitongo (yellow card) 36' (yellow-red card) 68'	SPFL Report		Stadium: Palmerston Park; Attendance: 912; Referee: Hardie; Man of the Match: L. Gibson

3 December 2022 Match 17	Dunfermline Athletic	1–1	Queen of the South	Dunfermline
15:00	Todorov 67'	SPFL Report	Paton 45'	Stadium: East End Park; Attendance: 3,927; Referee: Steven; Man of the Match: Wilson

17 December 2022 Match 18	Queen of the South	1–2	Kelty Hearts	Dumfries
15:00	Paton 7'	SPFL Report	Austin 80'; Higginbotham 84' (pen.)	Stadium: Palmerston Park; Attendance: 880; Referee: Cook; Man of the Match: Paton

23 December 2022 Match 19	Falkirk	5–2	Queen of the South	Falkirk
19:45	Alegria 16'; Morrison 45', 86'; Burrell 79'; Henderson 83'	SPFL Report	Paton 21'; Wilson 23'	Stadium: Falkirk Stadium; Attendance: 3.907; Referee: McFarlane; Man of the Match: Wilson

31 December 2022 Match 20	Queen of the South	1–0	Clyde	Dumfries
15:00	L. Gibson 86'	SPFL Report		Stadium: Palmerston Park; Attendance: 991; Referee: Hardie; Man of the Match: L. Gibson

7 January 2023 Match 21	Queen of the South	1–2	Alloa Athletic	Dumfries
15:00	Paton 28'	SPFL Report	Sammon 62'; MacIver 86'	Stadium: Palmerston Park; Attendance: 1,016; Referee: Fordyce; Man of the Match: Cowie

14 January 2023 Match 22	Montrose	1–0	Queen of the South	Montrose
15:00	Lyons 62'	SPFL Report	Todd (penalty missed) 85'	Stadium: Links Park; Attendance: 667; Referee: Kirkland; Man of the Match: Brydon

28 January 2023 Match 23	Peterhead	1–3	Queen of the South	Peterhead
15:00	Shanks 45+3' (pen.)	SPFL Report	Paton 55'; Kabia 79'; Murray 84'	Stadium: Balmoor Stadium; Attendance: 687; Referee: Williams; Man of the Match: East

4 February 2023 Match 24	Queen of the South	1–0	Edinburgh	Dumfries
15:00	Paton 53'	SPFL Report	Fontaine (yellow card) 52' (yellow-red card) 80'	Stadium: Palmerston Park; Attendance: 1,048; Referee: Lambie; Man of the Match: Paton

18 February 2023 Match 25	Kelty Hearts	3–0	Queen of the South	Kelty
15:00	Higginbotham 70' (pen.), 84'; Agyeman 76'	SPFL Report		Stadium: New Central Park; Attendance: 708; Referee: Cook; Man of the Match: Cochrane

25 February 2023 Match 26	Queen of the South	0–2	Dunfermline Athletic	Dumfries
15:00		SPFL Report	Wighton 22'; Benedictus 47'	Stadium: Palmerston Park; Attendance: 1,298; Referee: Fordyce; Man of the Match: Cochrane

4 March 2023 Match 27	Queen of the South	3–2	Airdrieonians	Dumfries
15:00	East 35'; Gibson 43'; McKechnie 56'	SPFL Report	Hendrie 51' (o.g.); Gallagher 72'	Stadium: Palmerston Park; Attendance: 935; Referee: Williams; Man of the Match: Cochrane

11 March 2023 Match 28	Clyde	1–1	Queen of the South	Hamilton
15:00	Šuľa 18'	SPFL Report	Paton 54'	Stadium: New Douglas Park; Attendance: 751; Referee: Graham; Man of the Match: Brydon

18 March 2023 Match 29	Queen of the South	1–0	Falkirk	Dumfries
15:00	Donaldson 39' (o.g.)	SPFL Report		Stadium: Palmerston Park; Attendance: 1,292; Referee: Cook; Man of the Match: Brydon

24 March 2023 Match 30	Edinburgh	1–3	Queen of the South	Edinburgh
19:45	Craigen 89'	SPFL Report	Paton 64'; Murray 80'; P. McKay 84'	Stadium: Meadowbank Stadium; Attendance: 444; Referee: Wilson; Man of the Match: Paton

1 April 2023 Match 31	Queen of the South	2–1	Peterhead	Dumfries
15:00	Paton 48' (pen.); Connelly 84'	SPFL Report	Jsn. Brown 69'	Stadium: Palmerston Park; Attendance: 1,003; Referee: Luke; Man of the Match: Brydon

8 April 2023 Match 32	Alloa Athletic	1–2	Queen of the South	Alloa
15:00	Taggart 65'	SPFL Report	Paton 14', 35'	Stadium: Indodrill Stadium; Attendance: 662; Referee: Williams; Man of the Match: Dabrowski

15 April 2023 Match 33	Dunfermline Athletic	5–0	Queen of the South	Dunfermline
15:00	Ritchie-Hosler 22'; Todd 39'; Wighton 52', 64'; O'Hara 78'	SPFL Report		Stadium: East End Park; Attendance: 5,892; Referee: Hardie; Man of the Match: Wilson

22 April 2023 Match 34	Queen of the South	2–3	Montrose	Dumfries
15:00	Brydon 8' (red card) 16'; Hendrie 20' (yellow card) 62' (yellow-red card) 64'	SPFL Report	McAllister 16' (pen.), 45+1'; C. Brown 38'	Stadium: Palmerston Park; Attendance: 989; Referee: Steven; Man of the Match: East

29 April 2023 Match 35	Airdrieonians	1–3	Queen of the South	Airdrie
15:00	Kouider-Aissa 70'	SPFL Report	Cochrane 20'; East 22'; Paton 83'	Stadium: Excelsior Stadium; Attendance: 1,290; Referee: Irvine; Man of the Match: Cochrane

6 May 2023 Match 36	Queen of the South	4–1	Kelty Hearts	Dumfries
15:00	Cochrane 8'; Paton 27', 69' (pen.); Murray 65'	SPFL Report	Agyeman 34'	Stadium: Palmerston Park; Attendance: 1,158; Referee: Cook; Man of the Match: Paton

=== Scottish League Cup ===
9 July 2022 Round 1;Group F-1	Queen of the South	2–3	Annan Athletic	Dumfries
15:00	Murray 8'; Paton 50'	SPFL Report	Currie 27' (o.g.); Johnston 33'; Hunter 87'	Stadium: Palmerston Park; Attendance: 1,222; Referee: Fordyce; Man of the Match: Paton

12 July 2022 Round 1;Group F-2	Ayr United	0–3	Queen of the South	Ayr
19:45		SPFL Report	Connelly 8'; Murray 60'; Todd 82'	Stadium: Somerset Park; Attendance: 1,352; Referee: Williams; Man of the Match: Currie

16 July 2022 Round 1;Group F-3	Queen of the South	2–2 (4–2 p)	St Johnstone	Dumfries
15:00	Connelly 12'; Paton 64'	SPFL Report	Murphy 49', 84'	Stadium: Palmerston Park; Attendance: 1,027; Referee: Grainger; Man of the Match: Paton
	Penalties
	Wilson (penalty scored); P. McKay (penalty scored); Todd (penalty scored); McGrory (penalty scored)		Murphy (penalty scored); Hallberg (penalty scored); Davidson (penalty missed); Kucheriavyi (penalty missed)

23 July 2022 Round 1;Group F-4	Elgin City	0–2	Queen of the South	Elgin
15:00		SPFL Report	McKechnie 50'; Paton 54'	Stadium: Borough Briggs; Attendance: 566; Referee: Kirkland; Man of the Match: Paton

30 August 2022 Round 2	Rangers	3–1	Queen of the South	Glasgow
19:45	Ure 10'; Arfield 24', 86'	SPFL Report	Connelly 17'	Stadium: Ibrox Stadium; Attendance: 30,569; Referee: Dickinson; Man of the Match: Connelly

=== Scottish Challenge Cup ===
22 September 2022 Round 3	Queen of the South	4–0	Edinburgh	Dumfries
19:45	Murray 23' (pen.); D McKay 54'; Ruth 71'; Connelly 84'	SPFL Report		Stadium: Palmerston Park; Attendance: 688; Referee: Graham; Man of the Match: Wilson

9 December 2022 Round 4	Alloa Athletic	2–4	Queen of the South	Alloa
19:45	King 15'; Cawley 39'	SPFL Report	Connelly 3', 78' (pen.); McKenna 49'; Todd 82'	Stadium: Indodrill Stadium; Attendance: 274; Referee: Grainger; Man of the Match: Connelly

10 January 2023 Round 5	Queen of the South	0–0 (4–2 p)	Kelty Hearts	Dumfries
19:45		SPFL Report		Stadium: Palmerston Park; Attendance: 602; Referee: MacDermid; Man of the Match: McGrory
	Penalties
	Reilly (penalty scored); Paton (penalty scored); Connelly (penalty missed); Todd (penalty scored); McGrory (penalty scored)		Tidser (penalty scored); Barjonas (penalty scored); Doherty (penalty missed); McNab (penalty missed)

7 February 2023 Round 6	Hamilton Academical	2–1 (a.e.t.)	Queen of the South	Hamilton
19:45	Zanatta 21'; One 96'	SPFL Report	Irving 72'	Stadium: New Douglas Park; Attendance: 1,049; Referee: Napier; Man of the Match: Dabrowski

=== Scottish Cup ===
26 November 2022 Round 3	Greenock Morton	4–1	Queen of the South	Greenock
15:00	Muirhead 23', 72'; Gillespie 89' (pen.); King 90+3'	BBC Sport Report	L. Gibson 31'	Stadium: Cappielow Park; Attendance: 1,614; Referee: Lambie; Man of the Match: L. Gibson

== Player statistics ==
=== Captains ===
No.	P	Name	Country	No. games	Notes
8	MF	Josh Todd	(England)	39	Club Captain
15	MF	Calvin McGrory	(Scotland)	1	Vice Captain
7	FW	Ruari Paton	(Republic of Ireland)	2	Vice Captain
5	DF	Paul McKay	(Scotland)	1	Vice Captain
4	MF	Iain Wilson	(Scotland)	2	Vice Captain
33	DF	Willie Gibson	(Scotland)	1	Player-Manager

Last updated: 6 May 2023
Source: Competitive match reports.
Competitive matches only
Matches started as captain only
Country: FIFA nationality; No.: Squad number; P: Position; Name: Player name; No. Games: Number of games started as captain.

=== Squad ===
As of 6 May 2023

No.	Pos	Nat	Player	Total		Scottish League One		Challenge Cup		League Cup		Scottish Cup	
No.	Pos	Nat	Player	Apps	Goals	Apps	Goals	Apps	Goals	Apps	Goals	Apps	Goals
1	GK	(Scotland) SCO	Max Currie	24	0	15+0	0	3+0	0	5+0	0	1+0	0
2	DF	(Scotland) SCO	David McKay	32	1	17+6	0	3+1	1	4+1	0	0+0	0
3	DF	(Scotland) SCO	Rico Quitongo	18	0	6+5	0	1+0	0	4+1	0	1+0	0
4	MF	(Scotland) SCO	Iain Wilson	29	1	22+3	1	2+0	0	0+1	0	1+0	0
5	DF	(Scotland) SCO	Paul McKay	32	1	26+0	1	2+0	0	3+0	0	1+0	0
6	MF	(Scotland) SCO	Harry Cochrane	36	3	18+9	3	2+1	0	4+1	0	0+1	0
7	FW	(Republic of Ireland) IRL	Ruari Paton	46	25	34+2	22	3+1	0	5+0	3	1+0	0
8	MF	(England) ENG	Josh Todd	41	6	29+2	4	4+0	1	5+0	1	1+0	0
9	FW	(Scotland) SCO	Gavin Reilly	24	5	18+2	5	0+2	0	1+0	0	1+0	0
10	FW	(Scotland) SCO	Lee Connelly	33	9	10+14	3	1+2	3	5+0	3	0+1	0
11	MF	(Scotland) SCO	Connor Murray	41	10	18+15	7	2+0	1	4+1	2	0+1	0
12	DF	(Scotland) SCO	Ciaran McKenna	32	1	22+0	0	3+1	1	5+0	0	1+0	0
*13	GK	(Scotland) SCO	Tom Ritchie	0	0	0+0	0	0+0	0	0+0	0	0+0	0
13	GK	(Scotland) SCO	Scott Fox	4	0	4+0	0	0+0	0	0+0	0	0+0	0
14	DF	(Scotland) SCO	Stuart Morrison	7	0	4+1	0	0+0	0	2+0	0	0+0	0
15	MF	(Scotland) SCO	Calvin McGrory	32	0	15+9	0	1+1	0	4+1	0	1+0	0
16	DF	(Scotland) SCO	Euan East	33	4	27+1	4	2+0	0	1+1	0	1+0	0
17	DF	(Scotland) SCO	Stephen Hendrie	35	1	28+2	1	4+0	0	1+0	0	0+0	0
18	MF	(Scotland) SCO	Kieran McKechnie	28	2	15+5	1	2+1	0	1+4	1	0+0	0
19	FW	(Scotland) SCO	Michael Ruth	23	1	3+14	0	3+1	1	0+1	0	0+1	0
20	FW	(Scotland) SCO	Ross Irving	15	1	3+9	0	1+1	1	0+0	0	0+1	0
21	MF	(Scotland) SCO	Dom McMahon	5	0	1+2	0	0+0	0	0+2	0	0+0	0
*22	FW	(England) ENG	Ewan Bange	6	1	1+4	1	0+1	0	0+0	0	0+0	0
22	FW	(Republic of Ireland) IRL	Jaze Kabia	4	1	2+2	1	0+0	0	0+0	0	0+0	0
23	DF	(Scotland) SCO	Cammy Logan	13	0	10+3	0	0+0	0	0+0	0	0+0	0
25	GK	(Poland) POL	Kevin Dabrowski	14	0	12+1	0	1+0	0	0+0	0	0+0	0
26	DF	(Scotland) SCO	Ryan Muir	5	0	0+2	0	1+0	0	0+2	0	0+0	0
27	FW	(Scotland) SCO	Lewis Gibson	30	4	15+9	3	2+1	0	0+2	0	1+0	1
28	MF	(Scotland) SCO	Ben Johnstone	1	0	0+0	0	0+0	0	0+1	0	0+0	0
29	DF	(Scotland) SCO	Jay Burns	0	0	0+0	0	0+0	0	0+0	0	0+0	0
30	GK	(Scotland) SCO	Charlie Cowie	2	0	2+0	0	0+0	0	0+0	0	0+0	0
32	DF	(Scotland) SCO	Lewis Currie	0	0	0+0	0	0+0	0	0+0	0	0+0	0
33	DF	(Scotland) SCO	Willie Gibson	8	0	3+2	0	1+1	0	1+0	0	0+0	0
35	DF	(Scotland) SCO	Jack Brydon	13	1	13+0	1	0+0	0	0+0	0	0+0	0
42	GK	(Switzerland) SUI	Gordon Botterill	3	0	3+0	0	0+0	0	0+0	0	0+0	0
43	GK	(Scotland) SCO	Sam Henderson	0	0	0+0	0	0+0	0	0+0	0	0+0	0

=== Disciplinary record ===
As of 6 May 2023 (UTC)

Number	Nation	Position	Name	Scottish League One		Challenge Cup		League Cup		Scottish Cup		Total	
Number	Nation	Position	Name	Booked	Sent off (straight red)	Booked	Sent off (straight red)	Booked	Sent off (straight red)	Booked	Sent off (straight red)	Booked	Sent off (straight red)
1	(Scotland)	GK	Max Currie	3	0	0	0	0	0	0	0	3	0
2	(Scotland)	DF	David McKay	2	0	0	0	2	0	0	0	4	0
3	(Scotland)	DF	Rico Quitongo	5	1	0	0	1	0	1	0	7	1
4	(Scotland)	MF	Iain Wilson	1	0	1	0	0	0	0	0	2	0
5	(Scotland)	DF	Paul McKay	1	1	0	0	0	0	0	0	1	1
6	(Scotland)	MF	Harry Cochrane	8	0	0	0	0	0	0	0	8	0
7	(Republic of Ireland)	FW	Ruari Paton	10	0	0	0	1	0	0	0	11	0
8	(England)	MF	Josh Todd	2	0	0	0	0	0	0	0	2	0
9	(Scotland)	FW	Gavin Reilly	2	0	0	0	0	0	1	0	3	0
10	(Scotland)	FW	Lee Connelly	2	1	0	0	1	0	0	0	3	1
11	(Scotland)	MF	Connor Murray	2	0	1	0	1	0	0	0	4	0
12	(Scotland)	DF	Ciaran McKenna	3	0	0	0	0	0	0	0	3	0
15	(Scotland)	MF	Calvin McGrory	1	0	0	0	0	0	0	0	1	0
16	(Scotland)	DF	Euan East	1	0	0	0	0	0	0	0	1	0
17	(Scotland)	DF	Stephen Hendrie	8	2	0	0	0	0	0	0	8	2
18	(Scotland)	MF	Kieran McKechnie	3	0	0	0	1	0	0	0	4	0
20	(Scotland)	FW	Ross Irving	0	0	2	0	0	0	0	0	2	0
21	(Scotland)	MF	Dom McMahon	1	0	0	0	0	0	0	0	1	0
23	(Scotland)	DF	Cammy Logan	2	0	0	0	0	0	0	0	2	0
27	(Scotland)	FW	Lewis Gibson	5	0	0	0	0	0	1	0	6	0
33	(Scotland)	DF	Willie Gibson	1	0	0	0	0	0	0	0	1	0
35	(Scotland)	DF	Jack Brydon	2	1	0	0	0	0	0	0	2	1
42	(Switzerland)	GK	Gordon Botterill	1	0	0	0	0	0	0	0	1	0
Totals				66	6	4	0	7	0	3	0	80	6

=== Top scorers ===
Last updated 6 May 2023

Position	Nation	Name	Scottish League One	League Cup	Challenge Cup	Scottish Cup	Total
1	(Republic of Ireland)	Ruari Paton	22	3	0	0	25
2	(Scotland)	Connor Murray	7	2	1	0	10
3	(Scotland)	Lee Connelly	3	3	3	0	9
4	(England)	Josh Todd	4	1	1	0	6
5	(Scotland)	Gavin Reilly	5	0	0	0	5
6	(Scotland)	Lewis Gibson	3	0	0	1	4
=	(Scotland)	Euan East	4	0	0	0	4
8	(Scotland)	Harry Cochrane	3	0	0	0	3
9	(Scotland)	Kieran McKechnie	1	1	0	0	2
10	(England)	Ewan Bange	1	0	0	0	1
=	(Scotland)	Michael Ruth	0	0	1	0	1
=	(Scotland)	David McKay	0	0	1	0	1
=	(Scotland)	Ciaran McKenna	0	0	1	0	1
=	(Scotland)	Iain Wilson	1	0	0	0	1
=	(Republic of Ireland)	Jaze Kabia	1	0	0	0	1
=	(Scotland)	Ross Irving	0	0	1	0	1
=	(Scotland)	Paul McKay	1	0	0	0	1
=	(Scotland)	Jack Brydon	1	0	0	0	1
=	(Scotland)	Stephen Hendrie	1	0	0	0	1

=== Clean sheets ===
R	Pos	Nat	Name	Scottish League One	League Cup	Challenge Cup	Scottish Cup	Total
1	GK	(Scotland)	Max Currie	4	2	2	0	8
13	GK	(Scotland)	Scott Fox	0	0	0	0	0
25	GK	(Poland)	Kevin Dabrowski	2	0	0	0	2
30	GK	(Scotland)	Charlie Cowie	1	0	0	0	1
42	GK	(Switzerland)	Gordon Botterill	0	0	0	0	0
Total				7	2	2	0	11

Last updated: 6 May 2023
Source: Match reports in Competitive matches

== Team statistics ==
=== Scottish League One ===
==== League table ====
Pos	Team	Pld	W	D	L	GF	GA	GD	Pts	Promotion, qualification or relegation
3	Airdrieonians (O, P)	36	17	9	10	82	51	+31	60	Qualification for the Championship play-offs
4	Alloa Athletic	36	17	6	13	56	47	+9	57	Qualification for the Championship play-offs
5	Queen of the South	36	16	6	14	59	59	0	54	
6	Edinburgh	36	15	6	15	60	55	+5	51	
7	Montrose	36	13	9	14	50	55	−5	48	

Rules for classification: 1) Points; 2) Goal difference; 3) Goals scored; 4) Head-to-to head points; 5) Head-to-head goal difference; 6) Play-off (only for deciding promotion, play-off participation and relegation).
(O) Play-off winners; (P) Promoted

==== Results by round ====
Round	1	2	3	4	5	6	7	8	9	10	11	12	13	14	15	16	17	18	19	20	21	22	23	24	25	26	27	28	29	30	31	32	33	34	35	36
Ground	H	A	H	A	A	H	H	H	A	A	H	A	H	A	A	H	A	H	A	H	H	A	A	H	A	H	H	A	H	A	H	A	A	H	A	H
Result	L	D	D	W	L	L	W	D	D	L	W	W	L	W	L	W	D	L	L	W	L	L	W	W	L	L	W	D	W	W	W	W	L	L	W	W
Position	10	8	8	6	8	8	7	7	7	7	7	6	7	7	7	7	7	7	7	7	8	8	7	7	7	8	7	7	7	6	6	5	5	7	6	5

Updated to match(es) played on 6 May 2023. Source:
A = Away; H = Home; W = Win; D = Draw; L = Loss

=== League Cup table ===
Pos	Team	Pld	W	PW	PL	L	GF	GA	GD	Pts	Qualification	ANN	QOS	STJ	AYR	ELG
1	Annan Athletic	4	2	2	0	0	8	3	+5	10	Qualification for the second round	—	—	—	p1–1	4–0
2	Queen of the South	4	2	1	0	1	9	5	+4	8	Qualification for the second round	2–3	—	p2–2	—	—
3	St Johnstone	4	2	0	2	0	7	4	+3	8		0–0p	—	—	1–0	—
4	Ayr United	4	1	0	1	2	4	5	−1	4		—	0–3	—	—	3–0 (Note: Ayr United were awarded a technical 3−0 win over Elgin City, who fielded an ineligible player. The match had originally finished 0–0, with Ayr United securing the bonus point following a 4–3 win on penalties.)
5	Elgin City	4	0	0	0	4	2	13	−11	0		—	0–2	2–4	—	—

Rules for classification: 1) goal difference, 2) goals scored, 3) away goals scored, 4) matches won, 5) away matches won, 6) drawing of lots.

=== Management statistics ===
Last updated 6 May 2023

Name	From	To	P	W	D	L	Win% (Note: Win% is the percentage of matches won rounded to two decimal places.)
Willie Gibson	9 July 2022	21 December 2022	26	10	6	10	38.46
Grant Murray	22 December 2022	7 January 2023	3	1	0	2	33.33
Marvin Bartley	8 January 2023	6 May 2023	17	9	2	6	52.94

== Transfers ==
=== Players in ===
Player	From	Fee
(Scotland) Gavin Reilly	(Scotland) Livingston	Free
(Scotland) David McKay	(Scotland) Raith Rovers	Free
(Scotland) Max Currie	(Scotland) Airdrieonians	Free
(Scotland) Rico Quitongo	(Scotland) Peterhead	Free
(Scotland) Stuart Morrison	(Scotland) Queen's Park	Free
(Scotland) Iain Wilson	(Scotland) Greenock Morton	Free
(Scotland) Connor Murray	(Scotland) Partick Thistle	Free
(Scotland) Michael Ruth	(Scotland) Aberdeen	Free
(Scotland) Euan East	(Scotland) Queen of the South	Free
(Scotland) Lee Connelly	(Scotland) Queen of the South	Free
(Scotland) Ciaran McKenna	(Scotland) Partick Thistle	Free
(Scotland) Tom Ritchie	(Scotland) Aberdeen	Loan
(Scotland) Ross Irving	(Scotland) Stranraer	Free
(Scotland) Stephen Hendrie	(Scotland) Partick Thistle	Free
(England) Ewan Bange	(England) Blackpool	Loan
(Scotland) Scott Fox	(Scotland) Motherwell	Loan
(Scotland) Sam Henderson	(Scotland) Petershill	Free
(Scotland) Jack Brydon	(Scotland) Hibernian	Undisclosed
(Poland) Kevin Dabrowski	(Scotland) Hibernian	Loan
(Switzerland) Gordon Botterill	(United States) Reading United	Free
(Republic of Ireland) Jaze Kabia	(Scotland) Livingston	Loan
(Scotland) Cammy Logan	(Scotland) Heart of Midlothian	Loan

=== Players out ===
Player	To	Fee
(Nigeria) Josh Debayo	(Scotland) Alloa Athletic	Free
(Scotland) Scott Dunn	Free Agent	Free
(Scotland) Matthew Henderson	Free Agent	Free
(England) Robert Nditi	(Scotland) Forfar Athletic	Free
(Scotland) Ally Roy	(Northern Ireland) Glentoran	Free
(Portugal) Ruben Soares-Junior	Free Agent	Free
(Nigeria) Udoka Chima	Free Agent	Free
(Scotland) Josh Rae	Free Agent	Free
(Scotland) Niyah Joseph	(Scotland) Stenhousemuir	Free
(Scotland) Innes Cameron	(Scotland) Kilmarnock	Loan
(Scotland) Max Johnston	(Scotland) Motherwell	Loan
(Republic of Ireland) Darragh O'Connor	(Scotland) Motherwell	Loan
(Northern Ireland) Shea Gordon	(Scotland) Partick Thistle	Loan
(England) Sam Folarin	(England) Middlesbrough	Loan
(England) Ben Liddle	(England) Bristol Rovers	Loan
(Scotland) Aidan Fitzpatrick	(Scotland) Partick Thistle	Free
(Scotland) Alex Cooper	Free Agent	Free
(Scotland) Charlie Cowie	(Scotland) Gartcairn	Loan
(Scotland) Tom Ritchie	(Scotland) Aberdeen	Loan
(Scotland) Ryan Muir	(Scotland) Gretna 2008	Loan
(Scotland) Scott Fox	(Scotland) Motherwell	Loan
(Scotland) Willie Gibson	Free Agent	Free
(Scotland) Max Currie	(Scotland) East Kilbride	Undisclosed
(England) Ewan Bange	(England) Blackpool	Loan
(Scotland) Sam Henderson	(Scotland) Mid-Annandale	Loan
(Scotland) Gavin Reilly	(Scotland) Stenhousemuir	Loan
(Scotland) Rico Quitongo	(Scotland) Clyde	Loan

== See also ==
- List of Queen of the South F.C. seasons
