= 2021–22 Partick Thistle F.C. season =

Partick Thistle
2021–22 season
- Chairman: Jacqui Low
- Manager: Ian McCall
- Stadium: Firhill Stadium
- Scottish Championship: 4th
- Premiership play-offs: Quarter-finals
- League Cup: Group stage
- Challenge Cup: Third round
- Scottish Cup: Fifth round
- Glasgow Cup: Group stage
- Top goalscorer: League: Brian Graham (13); All: Brian Graham (18)
- Highest home attendance: 4,315 vs. Kilmarnock, Championship, 18 September 2021
- Lowest home attendance: 500 vs. Kilmarnock, Championship, 14 January 2022
- Average home league attendance: 2,539
Home colours	Away colours

The 2021–22 season is Partick Thistle's first season back in the second tier of Scottish football in the Scottish Championship, having been promoted from League One at the end of the 2020–21 season. Thistle also competed in the League Cup, Challenge Cup, the Scottish Cup and the Glasgow Cup.

== Summary ==
On 3 June 2021, Queens Park announced a groundshare agreement with Partick Thistle to play their home matches at Firhill Stadium while redevelopment work continues at Lesser Hampden.

On 14 December, Thistle competed in their first fixture of the renewed Glasgow Cup tournament, which had been cancelled the previous two years because of the ongoing pandemic.

== Results and fixtures ==
Win Draw Loss Postponed

=== Pre-season ===
26 June 2021	Kelty Hearts	2–3	Partick Thistle	New Central Park
14:00	Tidser 27'; Austin 53'	Report	Turner 31'; Gordon 60'; Graham 70' (pen.)

3 July 2021	East Kilbride	1–2	Partick Thistle	K-Park Training Academy
14:00	McLaughlin 81'	Report	Murray; Ocholi

5 July 2021	Partick Thistle	0–1	Rangers	Firhill Stadium
19:00		Report	Itten 84'

=== Scottish Championship ===
31 July 2021 1	Partick Thistle	3–2	Queen of the South	Firhill Stadium
15:00	Graham 16', 30'; Tiffoney 85'	Report	Gibson 10'; Paton 74'	Attendance: 1,534; Referee: Greg Aitken

7 August 2021 2	Dunfermline Athletic	0–3	Partick Thistle	East End Park
15:00		Report	Docherty 7'; Holt 22'; Graham 78' (o.g.)	Attendance: 1,371; Referee: Craig Napier

21 August 2021 3	Arbroath	3–1	Partick Thistle	Gayfield Park
15:00	McKenna 45', 54'; Low 58'	Report	Hamilton 33' (o.g.)	Attendance: 1,585; Referee: Grant Irvine

28 August 2021 4	Partick Thistle	3–0	Greenock Morton	Firhill Stadium
15:00	Holt 9'; Graham 47'; Rudden 55'	Report		Attendance: 3,034; Referee: Peter Stuart

11 September 2021 5	Inverness CT	3–1	Partick Thistle	Caledonian Stadium
15:00	Broadfoot 51'; Sutherland 68'; Doran 71'	Report	Tiffoney 17'	Attendance: 2,148; Referee: Euan Anderson

18 September 2021 6	Partick Thistle	0–2	Kilmarnock	Firhill Stadium
15:00		Report	Holt 52' (o.g.); Shaw 65'	Attendance: 4,315; Referee: Willie Collum

26 September 2021 7	Raith Rovers	3–2	Partick Thistle	Stark's Park
15:00	Zanatta 22'; Benedictus 64' (pen.), 78'	Report	Graham 86'; Rudden 90+5'	Attendance: 1,781; Referee: Andrew Dallas

2 October 2021 8	Partick Thistle	4–0	Ayr United	Firhill Stadium
15:00	Rudden 34', 72'; Smith 45'; Graham 85'	Report		Attendance: 2,667; Referee: Duncan Williams

15 October 2021 9	Hamilton Academical	1–6	Partick Thistle	New Douglas Park
19:45	Moyo 89'	Report	Rudden 7', 58'; Graham 53', 74'; Tiffoney 61'; Murray 72'	Attendance: 1,775; Referee: Euan Anderson

23 October 2021 10	Partick Thistle	0–0	Dunfermline Athletic	Firhill Stadium
15:00		Report		Attendance: 3,333; Referee: Grant Irvine

26 October 2021 11	Greenock Morton	0–0	Partick Thistle	Cappielow
19:30		Report		Attendance: 1,867; Referee: Greg Aitken

30 October 2021 12	Partick Thistle	0–0	Inverness CT	Firhill Stadium
15:00		Report		Attendance: 2,527; Referee: Gavin Duncan

6 November 2021 13	Kilmarnock	0–1	Partick Thistle	Rugby Park
15:00		Report	Rudden 3'	Attendance: 4,560; Referee: Colin Steven

13 November 2021 14	Ayr United	0–4	Partick Thistle	Somerset Park
15:00		Report	Docherty 30'; Graham 33', 81'; Gordon 90+2'	Attendance: 2,037; Referee: Gavin Duncan

20 November 2021 15	Partick Thistle	1–0	Hamilton Academical	Firhill Stadium
15:00	Mayo 57'	Report		Attendance: 2,886; Referee: Euan Anderson

4 December 2021 16	Queen of the South	0–0	Partick Thistle	Palmerston Park
15:00		Report		Attendance: 1,308; Referee: Gavin Duncan

11 December 2021 17	Partick Thistle	0–2	Arbroath	Firhill Stadium
15:00		Report	Dowds 45'; Henderson 78'	Attendance: 2,285; Referee: Alan Newlands

18 December 2021 18	Partick Thistle	1–0	Raith Rovers	Firhill Stadium
15:00	Turner 90+6'	Report	Berra (red card) 61'	Attendance: 2,229; Referee: Steven Kirkland

8 January 2022 22	Hamilton Academical	2–2	Partick Thistle	New Douglas Park
15:00	Ryan 55' (pen.); Popescu 67'	Report	Tiffoney 45+1'; Rudden 64'	Attendance: 500; Referee: William Collum

14 January 2022 23	Partick Thistle	1–1	Kilmarnock	Firhill Stadium
19:45	Docherty 87'	Report	Shaw 59' (pen.)	Attendance: 500; Referee: Nick Walsh

1 February 2022 20	Partick Thistle	1–0	Ayr United	Firhill Stadium
19:45	Graham 51'	Report		Attendance: 2,207; Referee: Greg Aitken

9 February 2022 19	Inverness CT	3–3	Partick Thistle	Caledonian Stadium
19:45	McKay 21'; Sutherland 45+1'; Broadfoot 90+4'	Report	Graham 8', 27', 72' (pen.)

22 February 2022 21	Partick Thistle	0–1	Greenock Morton	Firhill Stadium
19:45		Report	McEntee 80'	Attendance: 2,345; Referee: Euan Anderson

26 February 2022 27	Raith Rovers	0–0	Partick Thistle	Stark's Park
15:00		Report		Referee: William Collum

1 March 2022 24	Arbroath	1–1	Partick Thistle	Gayfield Park
19:45	Hamilton 6'	Report	McKenna 60'	Attendance: 1,648; Referee: Peter Stuart

4 March 2022 28	Partick Thistle	1–0	Inverness CT	Firhill Stadium
15:00	Holt 85'	Report		Attendance: 2,099; Referee: Colin Steven

8 March 2022 25	Partick Thistle	1–0	Queen of the South	Firhill Stadium
19:45	Holt 82' (pen.)	Report		Attendance: 2,044; Referee: Nick Walsh

12 March 2022 29	Greenock Morton	2–1	Partick Thistle	Cappielow
15:00	Reilly 76'; Muirhead 86'	Report	Turner 5'	Attendance: 2,294; Referee: David Munro

19 March 2022 30	Partick Thistle	0–4	Hamilton Academical	Firhill Stadium
15:00		Report	Ryan 19', 50'; Moyo 45+1'; Winter 63'	Attendance: 2,567; Referee: Andrew Dallas

22 March 2022 26	Dunfermline Athletic	4–1	Partick Thistle	East End Park
19:45	Mayo 10' (o.g.); Todd 22'; Edwards 27'; Thomas 82'	Report	Docherty 5'	Attendance: 3,380; Referee: Steven McLean

26 March 2022 31	Kilmarnock	2–1	Partick Thistle	Rugby Park
15:00	Lafferty 22', 46'	Report	Docherty 87'	Attendance: 5,003; Referee: William Collum

2 April 2022 32	Partick Thistle	0–0	Arbroath	Firhill Stadium
15:00		Report		Attendance: 2,810; Referee: Alan Newlands

8 April 2022 33	Queen of the South	0–1	Partick Thistle	Palmerston Park
19:45		Report	Tiffoney 62'	Attendance: 1,099; Referee: Kevin Clancy

16 April 2022 34	Partick Thistle	0–1	Raith Rovers	Firhill Stadium
15:00		Report	Poplatnik 90'	Attendance: 2,644; Referee: David Munro

23 April 2022 35	Partick Thistle	1–0	Dunfermline Athletic	Firhill Stadium
15:00	Docherty 15'	Report		Attendance: 3,428; Referee: Don Robertson

29 April 2022 36	Ayr United	3–1	Partick Thistle	Somerset Park
19:45	Muirhead 5' (pen.), 61' (pen.); Adeloye 30'	Report	Jakubiak 81'	Attendance: 3,426; Referee: Bobby Madden

=== Premiership play-offs ===
3 May 2022 Quarter-finals 1st Leg	Partick Thistle	1–2	Inverness CT	Firhill Stadium
19:05	Crawford 54'	Report	Sutherland 71'; Samuels 82'	Attendance: 2,919; Referee: Steven McLean

6 May 2022 Quarter-finals 2nd Leg	Inverness CT	1–0 (3–1 agg.)	Partick Thistle	Caledonian Stadium
19:30	Samuels 29'	Report		Attendance: 2,354; Referee: Kevin Clancy

=== Scottish League Cup ===
==== Group stage ====
10 July 2021 1	Partick Thistle	2–4	Dunfermline Athletic	Firhill Stadium
15:00	Graham 16'; Rudden 64'	Report	Todorov 30', 53'; Comrie 35'; MacDonald 43'	Attendance: 1,000; Referee: Bobby Madden

17 July 2021 2	Stenhousemuir	1–2	Partick Thistle	Ochilview Park
15:00	Orr 32' (pen.)	Report	Rudden 52'; Graham 73'	Attendance: 290; Referee: Colin Steven

20 July 2021 3	Partick Thistle	2–0	Dumbarton	Firhill Stadium
19:45	Graham 45+1', 52'	Report		Attendance: 755; Referee: Mike Roncone

25 July 2021 4	St Mirren	2–0	Partick Thistle	St Mirren Park
15:00	McGrath 25' (pen.); Shaughnessy 90+5'	Report		Attendance: 1,023; Referee: Alan Muir

=== Scottish Challenge Cup ===
4 September 2021 Second round	Stranraer	0–2	Partick Thistle	Stair Park
15:00		Report	Akinola 12'; Holt 90+2'	Attendance: 598; Referee: Craig Napier

8 October 2021 Third round	Queen of the South	2–0	Partick Thistle	Palmerston Park
19:45	Connelly 69'; Roy 90+2'	Report		Attendance: 1,043; Referee: Alan Newlands

=== Scottish Cup ===
26 November 2021 Third round	Partick Thistle	1–0	Dunfermline Athletic	Glasgow
19:45	Docherty 82'	Report		Stadium: Firhill Stadium; Attendance: 2,198; Referee: John Beaton

22 January 2022 Fourth round	Partick Thistle	1–0	Airdrieonians	Glasgow
15:00	Graham 25'; Akinola (red card) 51'	Report		Stadium: Firhill Stadium; Attendance: 2,895; Referee: David Munro

12 February 2022 Fifth round	Partick Thistle	0–1	Dundee United	Glasgow
15:00		Report	Harkes 34'	Stadium: Firhill Stadium; Attendance: 4,632; Referee: John Beaton

=== Glasgow Cup ===
14 December 2021 Group stage	Partick Thistle	0–3	Rangers B	Milngavie
15:00		Report	McCausland 6'; Alegria 27', 42'	Stadium: Rangers Training Centre

18 January 2022 Group stage	Partick Thistle	1–2	Queen's Park	Glasgow
15:00	MacIver 14'	Report	Thomson 5'; Biggar 54'	Stadium: Petershill Park

9 March 2022 Group stage	Celtic B	5–0	Partick Thistle	Airdrie
15:00	Kenny 31'; Dembélé 32', 78'; Johnston 48'; Dawson 89'	Report		Stadium: Excelsior Stadium

29 March 2022 Group stage	Clyde	3–1	Partick Thistle	Cumbernauld
20:15	Monday 19', 36', 68'	Report	Lovering 2'	Stadium: Broadwood Stadium

== Squad statistics ==
=== Player statistics ===
As of 6 May 2022 (UTC)

No.	Pos	Nat	Player	Total		Championship		League Cup		Challenge Cup		Scottish Cup		Glasgow Cup	
No.	Pos	Nat	Player	Apps	Goals	Apps	Goals	Apps	Goals	Apps	Goals	Apps	Goals	Apps	Goals
1	GK	(Scotland) SCO	Jamie Sneddon	43	0	36+0	0	2+0	0	2+0	0	3+0	0	0+0	0
2	DF	(Scotland) SCO	Richard Foster	33	0	27+1	0	4+0	0	1+0	0	0+0	0	0+0	0
3	DF	(Scotland) SCO	Kevin Holt	45	5	35+1	4	4+0	0	2+0	1	3+0	0	0+0	0
4	DF	(Scotland) SCO	Lewis Mayo	34	1	32+0	1	0+0	0	0+0	0	2+0	0	0+0	0
5	DF	(Scotland) SCO	Darren Brownlie	0	0	0+0	0	0+0	0	0+0	0	0+0	0	0+0	0
6	MF	(Scotland) SCO	Kyle Turner	40	3	22+10	3	4+0	0	1+1	0	1+1	0	0+0	0
7	FW	(Scotland) SCO	Scott Tiffoney	39	5	30+1	5	2+1	0	2+0	0	3+0	0	0+0	0
8	MF	(Scotland) SCO	Stuart Bannigan	46	0	36+1	0	4+0	0	1+1	0	3+0	0	0+0	0
9	FW	(Scotland) SCO	Brian Graham	42	18	29+5	13	4+0	4	1+1	0	2+0	1	0+0	0
10	FW	(Scotland) SCO	Alex Jakubiak	14	0	8+5	0	0+0	0	0+0	0	1+0	0	0+0	0
11	MF	(Scotland) SCO	Cammy Smith	42	1	21+16	1	0+0	0	2+0	0	2+1	0	0+0	0
13	GK	(England) ENG	Andy Firth	1	0	0+0	0	0+0	0	0+0	0	0+0	0	1+0	0
14	MF	(Northern Ireland) NIR	Shea Gordon	13	1	1+7	1	0+1	0	1+1	0	0+1	0	1+0	0
15	DF	(Scotland) SCO	Steven Bell	14	0	1+7	0	3+1	0	0+0	0	0+0	0	2+0	0
16	DF	(Scotland) SCO	Ciaran McKenna	32	1	22+0	1	3+1	0	1+0	0	3+0	0	2+0	0
17	MF	(Scotland) SCO	Connor Murray	26	1	5+12	1	2+2	0	1+1	0	0+2	0	1+0	0
18	DF	(England) ENG	Tunji Akinola	33	1	26+3	0	0+0	0	2+0	1	2+0	0	0+0	0
21	MF	(Senegal) SEN	Mouhamed Niang	3	0	0+0	0	1+1	0	0+0	0	0+0	0	1+0	0
22	MF	(Scotland) SCO	Robbie Crawford	19	1	12+5	1	0+0	0	0+0	0	1+1	0	0+0	0
23	MF	(Scotland) SCO	Ross Docherty	44	6	36+0	5	3+1	0	1+0	0	3+0	1	0+0	0
25	FW	(Colombia) COL	Juan Alegría	12	0	5+7	0	0+0	0	0+0	0	0+0	0	0+0	0
26	FW	(Scotland) SCO	Gospel Ocholi	4	0	0+0	0	0+1	0	0+0	0	0+0	0	2+1	0
27	MF	(Scotland) SCO	Billy Owens	5	0	0+0	0	0+2	0	0+0	0	0+0	0	3+0	0
28	GK	(United States) USA	Mason McCready	1	0	0+0	0	0+0	0	0+0	0	0+0	0	1+0	0
30	MF	(Scotland) SCO	Ben Stanway	5	0	0+1	0	0+0	0	0+1	0	0+0	0	2+1	0
31	MF	(Scotland) SCO	Ji Stevenson	3	0	0+0	0	0+0	0	0+1	0	0+0	0	2+0	0
32	MF	(Scotland) SCO	Jake Hastie	6	0	0+5	0	0+0	0	0+0	0	0+0	0	1+0	0
33	DF	(Scotland) SCO	Stephen Hendrie	21	0	8+7	0	0+0	0	1+0	0	2+1	0	2+0	0
34	MF	(Scotland) SCO	Matthew Collins	0	0	0+0	0	0+0	0	0+0	0	0+0	0	0+0	0
37	MF	(Scotland) SCO	Kyle McAllister	3	0	2+1	0	0+0	0	0+0	0	0+0	0	0+0	0
Players who left the club during the 2021–22 season
4	MF	(Scotland) SCO	Thomas O'Ware	1	0	0+0	0	1+0	0	0+0	0	0+0	0	0+0	0
10	FW	(Scotland) SCO	Zak Rudden	26	10	17+2	8	3+1	2	1+0	0	2+0	0	0+0	0
12	GK	(Scotland) SCO	Harry Stone	5	0	2+0	0	2+0	0	0+0	0	0+0	0	1+0	0
13	GK	(United States) USA	Aaron Cervantes	0	0	0+0	0	0+0	0	0+0	0	0+0	0	0+0	0
19	FW	(Scotland) SCO	Ross MacIver	28	1	1+16	0	2+2	0	1+1	0	0+3	0	2+0	1
25	FW	(Scotland) SCO	Blair Lyons	1	0	0+0	0	0+0	0	0+0	0	0+0	0	1+0	0

== Club statistics ==
=== League table ===
Pos	Team	Pld	W	D	L	GF	GA	GD	Pts	Promotion, qualification or relegation
2	Arbroath	36	17	14	5	54	28	+26	65	Qualification for the Premiership play-off semi-final
3	Inverness Caledonian Thistle	36	16	11	9	53	34	+19	59	Qualification for the Premiership play-off quarter-final
4	Partick Thistle	36	14	10	12	46	40	+6	52	Qualification for the Premiership play-off quarter-final
5	Raith Rovers	36	12	14	10	44	44	0	50	
6	Hamilton Academical	36	10	12	14	38	53	−15	42	

Rules for classification: 1) Points; 2) Goal difference; 3) Goals scored; 4) Head-to-to head points; 5) Head-to-head goal difference; 6) Play-off (only for deciding promotion, play-off participation and relegation).

=== League Cup table ===
Pos	Team	Pld	W	PW	PL	L	GF	GA	GD	Pts	Qualification	STM	DNF	PAR	STE	DUM
1	St Mirren	4	4	0	0	0	9	1	+8	12	Qualification for the second round	—	1–0	2–0	—	—
2	Dunfermline Athletic	4	3	0	0	1	13	5	+8	9	Qualification for the second round	—	—	—	4–1	5–1
3	Partick Thistle	4	2	0	0	2	6	7	−1	6		—	2–4	—	—	2–0
4	Stenhousemuir	4	1	0	0	3	5	10	−5	3		1–3	—	1–2	—	—
5	Dumbarton	4	0	0	0	4	2	12	−10	0		0–3 (Note: St Mirren were awarded a technical 3−0 win over Dumbarton, who were unable to raise a team after a COVID-19 outbreak among players and staff.)	—	—	1–2	—

Rules for classification: 1) goal difference, 2) goals scored, 3) away goals scored, 4) matches won, 5) away matches won, 6) drawing of lots.

=== Glasgow Cup table ===
Pos	Team	Pld	W	D	L	GF	GA	GD	Pts	Qualification
1	Rangers B	4	3	1	0	15	1	+14	10	Qualification for the semi-final
2	Queen's Park	4	2	1	1	8	7	+1	7	Qualification for the semi-final
3	Celtic B	4	1	3	0	10	5	+5	6	Qualification for the semi-final
4	Clyde	4	1	1	2	5	14	−9	4	Qualification for the semi-final
5	Partick Thistle	4	0	0	4	2	13	−11	0	

Rules for classification: 1) Points; 2) Goal difference; 3) Goals scored; 4) Head-to-to head points; 5) Head-to-head goal difference.

== Transfers ==
=== In ===
Date	Position	Nationality	Name	From	Fee
19 May 2021	DF	(Scotland)	Kevin Holt	Ermis Aradippou	Free
31 May 2021	FW	(Scotland)	Ross MacIver	Motherwell	Free
31 May 2021	MF	(Scotland)	Kyle Turner	Dunfermline Athletic	Free
2 June 2021	FW	(Scotland)	Scott Tiffoney	Livingston	Swap Deal
11 June 2021	DF	(Scotland)	Steven Bell	East Kilbride	Free
23 July 2021	MF	(Scotland)	Cammy Smith	Indy Eleven	Free
18 August 2021	DF	(England)	Tunji Akinola	West Ham United	Free
9 September 2021	DF	(Scotland)	Stephen Hendrie	Morecambe	Free
7 January 2022	MF	(Scotland)	Robbie Crawford	Motherwell	Free

=== Out ===
Date	Position	Nationality	Name	To	Fee
19 May 2021	MF	(England)	Joe Cardle	Kelty Hearts	Free
19 May 2021	DF	(Scotland)	Ryan Williamson	Falkirk	Free
25 May 2021	MF	(Scotland)	Charlie Reilly	Albion Rovers	Free
2 June 2021	DF	(Scotland)	James Penrice	Livingston	Swap Deal
29 July 2021	MF	(Scotland)	Thomas O'Ware	Kelty Hearts	Free

=== Loans in ===
Date	Position	Nationality	Name	From	Fee
9 July 2021	GK	(Scotland)	Harry Stone	Heart of Midlothian	Loan
27 July 2021	DF	(Scotland)	Lewis Mayo	Rangers	Loan
16 August 2021	MF	(Scotland)	Jake Hastie	Rangers	Loan
22 January 2022	GK	(United States)	Aaron Cervantes	Rangers	Loan
31 January 2022	MF	(Scotland)	Kyle McAllister	St Mirren	Loan
31 January 2022	FW	(Scotland)	Alex Jakubiak	Dundee	Loan
12 February 2022	GK	(England)	Andy Firth	Rangers	Loan
28 February 2022	FW	(Colombia)	Juan Alegría	Rangers	Loan

=== Loans out ===
Date	Position	Nationality	Name	To	Fee
26 May 2021	MF	(Scotland)	Blair Lyons	Montrose	Loan
26 May 2021	MF	(Scotland)	James Lyon	Stenhousemuir	Loan
7 August 2021	FW	(Scotland)	Gospel Ocholi	Benburb	Loan
12 August 2021	MF	(Senegal)	Mouhamed Niang	Alloa Athletic	Loan
21 August 2021	MF	(Scotland)	Billy Owens	East Kilbride	Loan
13 January 2022	MF	(Northern Ireland)	Shea Gordon	Queen of the South	Loan
31 January 2022	FW	(Scotland)	Zak Rudden	Dundee	Loan
28 February 2022	FW	(Scotland)	Ross MacIver	Alloa Athletic	Loan

== See also ==
- List of Partick Thistle F.C. seasons
