= 2020–21 Partick Thistle F.C. season =

Partick Thistle
2020–21 season
- Chairman: Jacqui Low
- Manager: Ian McCall
- Stadium: Firhill Stadium, Glasgow
- Scottish League One: 1st (promoted)
- Scottish Cup: Third round
- League Cup: Group stage
- Top goalscorer: League: Brian Graham (11); All: Brian Graham (11)
Home colours	Away colours

The 2020–21 season was Partick Thistle's first season in the third tier of Scottish football in Scottish League One, having been relegated from the Scottish Championship at the end of the 2019–20 season. On 15 April 2020, the SPFL voted to end the lower leagues in Scottish football due to the coronavirus pandemic and as a result Partick were relegated to League One after two years in the Championship, which the club decided not to take legal action against. Partick Thistle also competed in the League Cup, and the Scottish Cup.

== Summary ==
On 2 October 2020, the SPFL confirmed that the Scottish Challenge Cup had been cancelled for the upcoming season. Partick Thistle began their season on 7 October in the League Cup group stage with the League One season beginning on 17 October.

On 11 January 2021, all football below the Scottish Championship was postponed due to the COVID-19 pandemic.

On 29 January 2021, the suspension was extended until at least 14 February. In March 2021, the Scottish Government gave permission for the league to resume.

On 16 March, clubs from League 1 and 2 voted to implement for a reduced 22-game season with a league split after 18 games.

On 29 April, Thistle were declared champions of League One and secured promotion to the Scottish Championship following their 5–0 victory over promotion rivals Falkirk.

== Competitions ==
=== Scottish League One ===
17 October 2020 1	Clyde	1 – 0	Partick Thistle	Broadwood Stadium
15:00	Love 70'	Report		Attendance: 0 Referee: David Dickinson

24 October 2020 2	Partick Thistle	2 – 1	Airdrieonians	Firhill Stadium
15:00	Graham 40'; Spittal 60'	Report	Carrick 36'	Referee: Graham Beaton

31 October 2020 3	Cove Rangers	1 – 0	Partick Thistle	Balmoral Stadium
15:00	McAllister 90+4'	Report

7 November 2020 4	Partick Thistle	2 – 2	Falkirk	Firhill Stadium
15:00	Cardle 66'; Graham 68'	Report	Morrison 13'; Telfer 88'	Attendance: 0 Referee: Grant Irvine

21 November 2020 5	Partick Thistle	2 – 0	East Fife	Firhill Stadium
15:00	Graham 17 pen.', 78'	Report		Attendance: 0 Referee: Duncan Williams

28 November 2020 6	Montrose	0 – 1	Partick Thistle	Links Park
15:00		Report	Murray 6'	Referee: Kevin Graham

5 December 2020 7	Partick Thistle	0 – 0	Dumbarton	Firhill Stadium
15:00		Report		Attendance: 0 Referee: David Lowe

12 December 2020 8	Forfar Athletic	0 – 2	Partick Thistle	Station Park
15:00		Report	Gordon 52'; Docherty 78'	Referee: Gavin Ross

19 December 2020 9	Partick Thistle	0 – 1	Peterhead	Firhill Stadium
15:00		Report	Brown 30'	Attendance: 0 Referee: Kevin Graham

26 December 2020 10	Falkirk	0 – 0	Partick Thistle	Falkirk Stadium
15:00		Report	Rudden (red card) 64'	Referee: Duncan Williams

20 March 2021 11	Partick Thistle	1 – 1	Cove Rangers	Firhill Stadium
15:00	Cardle 70'	Report	Megginson 82'	Attendance: 0 Referee: Steven Reid

27 March 2021 12	Airdrieonians	2 – 4	Partick Thistle	Excelsior Stadium
15:00	McKay 2'; Roy 72'; Crighton (red card) 78'	Report	Tiffoney 35', 62'; Graham 47'; Murray 49'	Referee: Craig Napier

30 March 2021 13	Partick Thistle	2 – 2	Forfar Athletic	Firhill Stadium
19:45	Murray 16'; Graham 66'	Report	Fenwick 2', 44'	Attendance: 0 Referee: David Lowe

6 April 2021 14	East Fife	2 – 2	Partick Thistle	Bayview Stadium
19:00	Wallace 14 pen.' Smith 17'	Report	Graham 72'; Tiffoney 90+4'	Attendance: 0 Referee: David Dickinson

10 April 2021 15	Peterhead	0 – 3	Partick Thistle	Balmoor Stadium
15:00		Report	Cardle 39'; Tiffoney 52'; Graham 60'	Attendance: 0 Referee: Kevin Graham

13 April 2021 16	Partick Thistle	2 – 0	Clyde	Firhill Stadium
19:00	Rudden 65', 90'	Report		Attendance: 0 Referee: Lloyd Wilson

15 April 2021 17	Partick Thistle	5 – 0	Montrose	Firhill Stadium
19:00	Rudden 20', 38'; Bannigan 52'; Tiffoney 55'; Gordon 77'	Report		Attendance: 0 Referee: Alan Muir

20 April 2021 18	Dumbarton	0 – 2	Partick Thistle	Dumbarton Football Stadium
19:45		Report	Rudden 80'; MacIver 89'	Attendance: 0 Referee: Barry Cook

24 April 2021 19	Partick Thistle	1 – 0	Airdrieonians	Firhill Stadium
15:00	Graham 31'	Report		Attendance: 0 Referee: Grant Irvine

27 April 2021 20	Cove Rangers	2 – 2	Partick Thistle	Balmoral Stadium
19:00	McAllister 21 pen.' Strachan 75'	Report	Rudden 7'; Tiffoney 77'	Attendance: 0 Referee: Craig Napier

29 April 2021 21	Partick Thistle	5 – 0	Falkirk	Glasgow
19:00	Rudden 29'; Tiffoney 31'; Graham 41', 59'; Cardle 72'	Report		Stadium: Firhill Stadium; Attendance: 0 Referee: David Dickinson

4 May 2021 22	Montrose	3 – 2	Partick Thistle	Links Park
19:00	Rennie 19'; McLean 36'; Ballantyne 87'	Report	MacIver 25'; Cardle 62'	Attendance: 0 Referee: Peter Stuart

=== Scottish League Cup ===
==== Group stage ====
7 October 2020 Group	St Mirren	4–1	Partick Thistle	St Mirren Park
19:45	Tait 45+1'; Obika 74'; Breen 81 o.g.' Connolly 82'			Attendance: 0 Referee: Colin Steven

10 October 2020 Group	Partick Thistle	2–0	Queen's Park	Firhill Stadium
19:45	Cardle 66', 81'			Attendance: 0 Referee: Kevin Graham

13 October 2020 Group	Queen of the South	0–0 (2–3 p)	Partick Thistle	Dumfries
19:45				Stadium: Palmerston Park; Attendance: 0 Referee: Peter Stuart
	Penalties
	Obileye (penalty scored); McCabe (penalty scored); Buchanan (penalty missed); Gibson (penalty missed); Nortey (penalty missed)		(penalty scored) Rudden; (penalty missed) Docherty; (penalty missed) Spittal; (penalty scored) Kouider-Aïssa; (penalty scored) McKenna

14 November 2020 Group	Partick Thistle	0–0 (4–2 p)	Greenock Morton	Glasgow
15:00				Stadium: Firhill Stadium; Referee: Steven Kirkland
	Penalties
	Bannigan (penalty scored); Foster (penalty scored); Cardle (penalty scored); Penrice (penalty scored)		(penalty scored) Jacobs; (penalty missed) Wallace; (penalty scored) McGinty; (penalty missed) Omar

=== Scottish Cup ===
23 March 2021 Second round	Partick Thistle	3–0	Cowdenbeath	Firhill Stadium
19:45	Gordon 7'; Rudden 52'; Murray 66'	Report		Attendance: 0 Referee: Graham Grainger

3 April 2021 Third round	Dundee United	2–1	Partick Thistle	Tannadice Park
15:00	Shankland 78'; Clark 90+!'	Report	Tiffoney 25'	Attendance: 0 Referee: Steven McLean

== Squad statistics ==
=== Player statistics ===
As of 4 May 2021 (UTC)

No.	Pos	Nat	Player	Total		League One		League Cup		Scottish Cup	
No.	Pos	Nat	Player	Apps	Goals	Apps	Goals	Apps	Goals	Apps	Goals
1	GK	(Scotland) SCO	Jamie Sneddon	13	0	10+0	0	3+0	0	0+0	0
2	DF	(Scotland) SCO	Ryan Williamson	18	0	12+2	0	2+1	0	1+0	0
3	DF	(Scotland) SCO	James Penrice	24	0	14+4	0	4+0	0	1+1	0
4	MF	(Scotland) SCO	Thomas O'Ware	16	1	12+0	1	4+0	0	0+0	0
5	DF	(Scotland) SCO	Darren Brownlie	27	0	20+1	0	4+0	0	2+0	0
6	MF	(Scotland) SCO	Steven Bell	10	0	8+2	0	0+0	0	0+0	0
7	MF	(England) ENG	Joe Cardle	26	7	14+6	5	3+1	2	2+0	0
8	MF	(Scotland) SCO	Stuart Bannigan	24	1	19+0	1	4+0	0	1+0	0
9	FW	(Scotland) SCO	Brian Graham	24	12	18+1	12	3+0	0	1+1	0
10	FW	(Scotland) SCO	Zak Rudden	17	8	7+6	7	1+1	0	1+1	1
11	FW	(Scotland) SCO	Blair Lyons	12	0	1+9	0	0+2	0	0+0	0
12	GK	(Scotland) SCO	Kieran Wright	15	0	12+0	0	1+0	0	2+0	0
14	MF	(Northern Ireland) NIR	Shea Gordon	27	3	11+10	2	4+0	0	2+0	1
15	MF	(Scotland) SCO	Chris Erskine	2	0	0+2	0	0+0	0	0+0	0
16	DF	(Scotland) SCO	Ciaran McKenna	16	0	9+2	0	2+1	0	1+1	0
17	MF	(Scotland) SCO	Connor Murray	26	4	16+4	3	3+1	0	0+2	1
18	MF	(Scotland) SCO	Charlie Reilly	3	0	1+1	0	0+1	0	0+0	0
19	MF	(Scotland) SCO	Scott Tiffoney	13	7	9+2	6	0+0	0	2+0	1
20	FW	(Scotland) SCO	Gospel Ocholi	0	0	0+0	0	0+0	0	0+0	0
21	MF	(Senegal) SEN	Mouhamed Niang	21	0	12+5	0	0+3	0	1+0	0
22	DF	(Scotland) SCO	Richard Foster	24	0	20+0	0	3+0	0	1+0	0
23	MF	(Scotland) SCO	Ross Docherty	23	1	19+0	1	3+0	0	1+0	0
24	MF	(Scotland) SCO	Billy Owens	1	0	0+1	0	0+0	0	0+0	0
25	GK	(United States) USA	Mason McCready	0	0	0+0	0	0+0	0	0+0	0
26	MF	(Scotland) SCO	James Lyon	3	0	0+2	0	0+0	0	0+1	0
27	GK	(Scotland) SCO	Luke Scullion	0	0	0+0	0	0+0	0	0+0	0
28	DF	(Scotland) SCO	Andy Rodden	0	0	0+0	0	0+0	0	0+0	0
30	DF	(Scotland) SCO	Bradley Renfrew	0	0	0+0	0	0+0	0	0+0	0
31	FW	(Scotland) SCO	Ross MacIver	8	2	3+4	2	0+0	0	1+0	0
88	MF	(Scotland) SCO	Andy Geggan	5	0	0+5	0	0+0	0	0+0	0
Players who left the club during the 2020–21 season
6	MF	(Scotland) SCO	Blair Spittal	7	1	3+1	1	2+1	0	0+0	0
15	DF	(Scotland) SCO	Rhys Breen	6	0	3+1	0	2+0	0	0+0	0
19	FW	(Scotland) SCO	Salim Kouider-Aissa	1	0	1+0	0	0+0	0	0+0	0
19	DF	(Scotland) SCO	Adam Devine	0	0	0+0	0	0+0	0	0+0	0
29	MF	(Scotland) SCO	Dean Watson	0	0	0+0	0	0+0	0	0+0	0

== Club statistics ==
=== League table ===
Pos	Team	Pld	W	D	L	GF	GA	GD	Pts	Promotion, qualification or relegation
1	Partick Thistle (C, P)	22	11	7	4	40	18	+22	40	Promotion to the Championship
2	Airdrieonians	22	12	2	8	35	24	+11	38	Qualification for the Championship play-offs
3	Cove Rangers	22	10	6	6	28	18	+10	36	Qualification for the Championship play-offs
4	Montrose	22	9	6	7	33	33	0	33	Qualification for the Championship play-offs
5	Falkirk	22	9	5	8	29	26	+3	32	

Source: SPFL
Rules for classification: 1) Points; 2) Goal difference; 3) Goals scored; 4) Head-to-to head points; 5) Head-to-head goal difference; 6) Play-off (only for deciding promotion, play-off participation and relegation).
(C) Champions; (P) Promoted

=== Division summary ===
Round	1	2	3	4	5	6	7	8	9	10	11	12	13	14	15	16	17	18	19	20	21	22
Ground	A	H	A	H	H	A	H	A	H	A	H	A	H	A	A	H	H	A	H	A	H	A
Result	L	W	L	D	W	W	D	W	L	D	D	W	D	D	W	W	W	W	W	D	W	L
Position	7	5	6	6	4	4	3	2	3	5	5	3	4	5	3	3	2	1	1	1	1	1

Updated to match(es) played on 4 May 2021. Source:
A = Away; H = Home; W = Win; D = Draw; L = Loss

=== League Cup table ===
Pos	Team	Pld	W	PW	PL	L	GF	GA	GD	Pts	Qualification	STM	QOS	PAR	GMO	QPK
1	St Mirren	4	2	2	0	0	8	4	+4	10	Qualification for the Second round	—	—	4–1	p1–1	—
2	Queen of the South	4	1	1	2	0	7	5	+2	7		2–2p	—	0–0p	—	—
3	Partick Thistle	4	1	2	0	1	3	4	−1	7		—	—	—	p0–0	2–0
4	Greenock Morton	4	1	0	3	0	4	3	+1	6		—	2–2p	—	—	1–0
5	Queen's Park	4	0	0	0	4	1	7	−6	0		0–1	1–3	—	—	—

Rules for classification: 1) points, 2) goal difference, 3) goals scored, 4) away goals scored, 5) matches won, 6) away matches won, 7) drawing of lots.

== Transfers ==
=== In ===
Date	Position	Nationality	Name	From	Fee
1 June 2020	MF	(Scotland)	Ross Docherty	Ayr United	Free
20 July 2020	DF	(Scotland)	Richard Foster	Ross County	Free
25 July 2020	MF	(Scotland)	Connor Murray	Queen of the South	Free
21 August 2020	DF	(Scotland)	Ciaran McKenna	Hamilton Academical	Free
2 October 2020	MF	(Scotland)	Charlie Reilly	Hamilton Academical	Free

=== Out ===
Date	Position	Nationality	Name	From	Fee
22 June 2020	MF	(Scotland)	Scott Fox	Motherwell	Free
4 July 2020	FW	(England)	Alex Jones	Northampton Town	Free
5 July 2020	MF	(Scotland)	Darian MacKinnon	Drumchapel United	Free
21 July 2020	MF	(Canada)	Dario Zanatta	Ayr United	Free
16 August 2020	DF	(Scotland)	Steven Saunders	Gartcairn	Free
27 August 2020	DF	(England)	Thomas Robson	Queen's Park	Free
22 September 2020	FW	(England)	Lewis Mansell	Accrington Stanley	Free

=== Loans in ===
Date	Position	Nationality	Name	From	Fee
27 August 2020	DF	(Scotland)	Rhys Breen	Rangers	Loan
27 August 2020	GK	(Scotland)	Kieran Wright	Rangers	Loan
16 September 2020	FW	(Scotland)	Salim Kouider-Aissa	Livingston	Loan
24 September 2020	MF	(Scotland)	Declan Glass	Dundee United	Loan
7 October 2020	MF	(Scotland)	Blair Spittal	Ross County	Loan
8 March 2021	MF	(Scotland)	Andy Geggan	BSC Glasgow	Loan
12 March 2021	DF	(Scotland)	Steven Bell	East Kilbride	Loan
12 March 2021	DF	(Scotland)	Chris Erskine	East Kilbride	Loan
15 March 2021	FW	(Scotland)	Ross MacIver	Motherwell	Loan
23 March 2021	MF	(Scotland)	Scott Tiffoney	Livingston	Loan

=== Loans out ===
Date	Position	Nationality	Name	From	Fee
8 January 2021	MF	(Scotland)	Dean Watson	Annan Athletic	Loan

== See also ==
- List of Partick Thistle F.C. seasons
