= 2018–19 Falkirk F.C. season =

Falkirk
2018–19 season
- Chairman: Margaret Lang
- Manager: Paul Hartley (until 27 August); Ray McKinnon (from 31 August)
- Stadium: Falkirk Stadium
- Championship: 10th (relegated)
- Scottish Cup: Third round
- League Cup: Group stage
- Challenge Cup: Second round
- Top goalscorer: League: Zak Rudden (12); All: Zak Rudden (12)
- Highest home attendance: 6,173 vs. Dunfermline Athletic, Championship, 6 October 2018
- Lowest home attendance: 1,429 vs. Forfar Athletic, League Cup, 17 July 2018
- Average home league attendance: 4,742
Home colours	Away colours

The 2018–19 season was Falkirk's sixth consecutive season in the Scottish Championship and their eighth consecutive season in the second-tier of Scottish football. Falkirk also competed in the League Cup, Challenge Cup and the Scottish Cup. Falkirk finished the season in tenth place and were relegated to the third-tier of Scottish football for only the second time in their history.

== Summary ==
=== Management ===
Falkirk began the 2018–19 season under the management of Paul Hartley who had guided the club to safety from relegation in his previous season. On 27 August, Hartley left his position as manager following a poor start to the season. Ray McKinnon was appointed as his replacement on 31 August but he could not prevent the club from being relegated. Falkirk's relegation was confirmed on the final day of the season despite winning their final match against league winners Ross County.

== Results and fixtures ==
Win Draw Loss Postponed

=== Pre Season ===
29 June 2018	The New Saints	2–0	Falkirk	Oswestry
19:00	Brobbel; Cieslewicz	Report		Stadium: Park Hall

29 June 2018	Aberdeen	1–0	Falkirk	Arbroath
19:30	Ferguson 83'	Report		Stadium: Gayfield Park

7 July 2018	Falkirk	3–2	Airdrieonians	Falkirk
15:00	Petravičius 6'; O'Hara 16'; Dallison 33'	Report	O'Neil 27'; McIntosh 75'	Stadium: Falkirk Stadium

10 July 2018	Alloa Athletic	1–2	Falkirk	Alloa
19:45	Graham 73'	Report	Lewis 45'; Allan 76'	Stadium: Recreation Park

=== Scottish Championship ===
4 August 2018 1	Falkirk	0–1	Inverness CT	Falkirk
15:00		Report	Oakley 10'	Stadium: Falkirk Stadium; Attendance: 4,538; Referee: Steven McLean

11 August 2018 2	Partick Thistle	2–1	Falkirk	Glasgow
15:00	Penrice 24'; Erskine 28'	Report	Greenwood 90+1'	Stadium: Firhill Stadium; Attendance: 3,417; Referee: Kevin Clancy

25 August 2018 3	Falkirk	0–3	Queen of the South	Falkirk
15:00		Report	Dobbie 11', 39', 75'	Stadium: Falkirk Stadium; Attendance: 4,026; Referee: Steven Reid

1 September 2018 4	Ross County	2–0	Falkirk	Dingwall
15:00	Lindsay 68'; McManus 90'	Report		Stadium: Victoria Park; Attendance: 3,564; Referee: Nick Walsh

15 September 2018 5	Ayr United	3–2	Falkirk	Ayr
15:00	Shankland 48'; Geggan 63'; Fasan 65' (o.g.)	Report	Rudden 18'; Petravičius 25'	Stadium: Somerset Park; Attendance: 2,250; Referee: Alan Newlands

22 September 2018 6	Falkirk	0–2	Dundee United	Falkirk
15:00		Report	Šafranko 59'; Curran 86'	Stadium: Falkirk Stadium; Attendance: 4,933; Referee: Alan Muir

29 September 2018 7	Alloa Athletic	0–2	Falkirk	Alloa
15:00		Report	Rudden 26', 69'	Stadium: Recreation Park; Attendance: 1,392; Referee: Steven Kirkland

6 October 2018 8	Falkirk	0–2	Dunfermline Athletic	Falkirk
15:00		Report	Ryan 40'; Hippolyte 90'	Stadium: Falkirk Stadium; Attendance: 6,173; Referee: Bobby Madden

20 October 2018 9	Greenock Morton	1–0	Falkirk	Greenock
15:00	McHugh 76'	Report	Fasan (red card) 49'	Stadium: Cappielow; Attendance: 2,757; Referee: John Beaton

27 October 2018 10	Queen of the South	2–0	Falkirk	Dumfries
15:00	Doyle 52'; Marshall 54'	Report		Stadium: Palmerston Park; Attendance: 1,463; Referee: Colin Steven

30 October 2018 11	Falkirk	1–1	Ross County	Falkirk
19:45	Cowie 25' (o.g.)	Report	Vigurs 78'	Stadium: Falkirk Stadium; Attendance: 3,767; Referee: Euan Anderson

3 November 2018 12	Falkirk	0–1	Ayr United	Falkirk
15:00		Report	Moore 51'	Stadium: Falkirk Stadium; Attendance: 4,310; Referee: Greg Aitken

10 November 2018 13	Dunfermline Athletic	0–1	Falkirk	Dunfermline
15:00		Report	Rudden 71'	Stadium: East End Park; Attendance: 5,762; Referee: Andrew Dallas

17 November 2018 14	Falkirk	1–1	Partick Thistle	Falkirk
15:00	McKee 59'	Report	Slater 57'	Stadium: Falkirk Stadium; Attendance: 4,589; Referee: Craig Thomson

1 December 2018 15	Inverness CT	2–3	Falkirk	Inverness
15:00	Walsh 6'; Oakley 61'	Report	Rudden 16', 36'; Harrison 90+3'	Stadium: Caledonian Stadium; Attendance: 2,260; Referee: Colin Steven

8 December 2018 16	Falkirk	2–2	Alloa Athletic	Falkirk
15:00	Petravičius 7'; Paton 28'	Report	Trouten 42', 77'	Stadium: Falkirk Stadium; Attendance: 3,907; Referee: Barry Cook

15 December 2018 17	Falkirk	0–0	Greenock Morton	Falkirk
15:00		Report		Stadium: Falkirk Stadium; Attendance: 3,775; Referee: Gavin Ross

22 December 2018 18	Dundee United	2–1	Falkirk	Dundee
15:00	Stanton 22'; Šafranko 53'	Report	Paton (red card) 65'; Muirhead 90+2' (pen.)	Stadium: Tannadice Park; Attendance: 5,267; Referee: Colin Steven

29 December 2018 19	Falkirk	2–4	Dunfermline Athletic	Falkirk
15:00	McKee 2'; Harrison 74'	Report	Hippolyte 13'; Beadling 17', 51'; Vincent 67'	Stadium: Falkirk Stadium; Attendance: 5,786; Referee: Colin Steven

5 January 2019 20	Ayr United	0–1	Falkirk	Ayr
15:00		Report	Rudden 56'	Stadium: Somerset Park; Attendance: 2,729; Referee: John Beaton

12 January 2019 21	Partick Thistle	1–1	Falkirk	Glasgow
15:00	Spittal 61'; Harkins (red card) 74'	Report	Rudden 76'	Stadium: Firhill Stadium; Attendance: 4,438; Referee: Andrew Dallas

26 January 2019 22	Falkirk	2–2	Dunfermline Athletic	Falkirk
15:00	Rudden 29'; McShane 56'	Report	Rooney 12'; Doran 45'	Stadium: Falkirk Stadium; Attendance: 5,843; Referee: David Munro

2 February 2019 23	Falkirk	3–0	Queen of the South	Falkirk
15:00	Keillor–Dunn 8' (red card) 72'; Edjenguélé 64'; Petravičius 77'	Report		Stadium: Falkirk Stadium; Attendance: 4,538; Referee: Gavin Duncan

9 February 2019 24	Alloa Athletic	1–2	Falkirk	Alloa
15:00	Shields 31'	Report	McGhee 20'; Waddington 46'	Stadium: Recreation Park; Attendance: 2,116; Referee: Craig Thomson

23 February 2019 25	Falkirk	1–1	Dundee United	Falkirk
15:00	McKenna 84'	Report	Smith 49'	Stadium: Falkirk Stadium; Attendance: 5,840; Referee: Greg Aitken

1 March 2019 26	Greenock Morton	1–1	Falkirk	Greenock
19:05	Kiltie 32'	Report	Rudden 40'; Dixon (red card) 60'	Stadium: Cappielow; Attendance: 1,838; Referee: Andrew Dallas

8 March 2019 27	Falkirk	2–0	Ayr United	Falkirk
19:05	McGhee 27', 40'	Report		Stadium: Falkirk Stadium; Attendance: 4,344; Referee: Alan Muir

12 March 2019 28	Ross County	2–1	Falkirk	Dingwall
19:45	Graham 12'; Watson 22'; Grivosti (red card) 85'	Report	McShane 87' (pen.)	Stadium: Victoria Park; Attendance: 3,148; Referee: Steven Kirkland

16 March 2019 29	Falkirk	1–1	Partick Thistle	Falkirk
15:00	McShane 87' (pen.)	Report	McDonald 10'	Stadium: Falkirk Stadium; Attendance: 4,896; Referee: Mike Roncone

30 March 2019 30	Inverness CT	0–0	Falkirk	Inverness
15:00		Report		Stadium: Caledonian Stadium; Attendance: 2,817; Referee: Gavin Ross

2 April 2019 31	Queen of the South	1–1	Falkirk	Dumfries
19:45	Dobbie 90+6' (pen.)	Report	Keillor–Dunn 90+2' (pen.) (red card) 90+4'	Stadium: Palmerston Park; Attendance: 1,508; Referee: Barry Cook

6 April 2019 32	Falkirk	1–2	Alloa Athletic	Falkirk
15:00	Rudden 46'	Report	Zanatta 38'; Kirkpatrick 86'	Stadium: Falkirk Stadium; Attendance: 4,170; Referee: Alan Newlands

13 April 2019 33	Dunfermline Athletic	0–1	Falkirk	Dunfermline
15:00		Report	Keillor–Dunn 77'	Stadium: East End Park; Attendance: 6,089; Referee: Willie Collum

20 April 2019 34	Falkirk	0–2	Greenock Morton	Falkirk
15:00		Report	Kiltie 47'; Telfer 54'	Stadium: Falkirk Stadium; Attendance: 5,254; Referee: Colin Stewart

27 April 2019 35	Dundee United	2–0	Falkirk	Dundee
15:00	Bouhenna 15'; McMullan 26'	Report		Stadium: Tannadice Park; Attendance: 5,260; Referee: Steven Kirkland

4 May 2019 36	Falkirk	3–2	Ross County	Falkirk
15:00	Rudden 27'; McKenna 75'; McGhee 77'	Report	Stewart 58'; Vigurs 73'	Stadium: Falkirk Stadium; Attendance: 4,682; Referee: Steven McLean

=== Scottish League Cup ===
==== Group stage ====
Results

14 July 2018 Group stage	Falkirk	0–1	Montrose	Falkirk
15:00		Report	Rennie 19'	Stadium: Falkirk Stadium; Attendance: 1,730; Referee: Graham Beaton

17 July 2018 Group stage	Falkirk	2–0	Forfar Athletic	Falkirk
19:45	Lewis 54'; Petravičius 82'	Report		Stadium: Falkirk Stadium; Attendance: 1,429; Referee: Steve Kirkland

24 July 2018 Group stage	St Johnstone	1–0	Falkirk	Perth
19:45	Scougall 31'	Report		Stadium: McDiarmid Park; Attendance: 2,379; Referee: Craig Thomson

28 July 2018 Group stage	East Fife	1–2	Falkirk	Fife
15:00	Dowds 24'	Report	Mackin 49', 63'	Stadium: Bayview Stadium; Attendance: 670; Referee: Colin Steven

Pos	Team	Pld	W	PW	PL	L	GF	GA	GD	Pts	Qualification	STJ	FAL	MON	FOR	EFI
1	St Johnstone (Q)	4	3	1	0	0	5	1	+4	11	Qualification for the Second round	—	1–0	—	—	p0–0
2	Falkirk	4	2	0	0	2	4	3	+1	6		—	—	0–1	2–0	—
3	Montrose	4	2	0	0	2	3	4	−1	6		0–1	—	—	—	1–0
4	Forfar Athletic	4	1	1	0	2	5	7	−2	5		1–3	—	3–1	—	—
5	East Fife	4	0	0	2	2	2	4	−2	2		—	1–2	—	1–1p	—

Rules for classification: 1) goal difference, 2) goals scored, 3) away goals scored, 4) matches won, 5) away matches won, 6) drawing of lots.
(Q) Qualified to the phase indicated

=== Scottish Challenge Cup ===
14 August 2018 First round	Rangers U21s	1–2	Falkirk	Stirling
19:30	Rudden 90'	Report	Lewis 4'; Harrison 21'	Stadium: Forthbank Stadium; Attendance: 636; Referee: Euan Anderson

8 September 2018 Second round	Falkirk	0–1	(Wales) Connah's Quay Nomads	Falkirk
15:00		Report	Wilde 46'	Stadium: Falkirk Stadium; Attendance: 1,637; Referee: Daniel Middelton

=== Scottish Cup ===
24 November 2018 Third round	Stenhousemuir	4–2	Falkirk	Stenhousemuir
19:30	McBrearty 12', 16'; Dickson 59'; McGuigan 85'	Report	Paton 5'; McKee 42'	Stadium: Ochilview Park; Attendance: 2,050; Referee: Alan Newlands

== Player statistics ==
As of 4 May 2019 (UTC)

No.	Pos	Nat	Player	Total		Championship		League Cup		Scottish Cup		Other	
No.	Pos	Nat	Player	Apps	Goals	Apps	Goals	Apps	Goals	Apps	Goals	Apps	Goals
1	GK	(Italy) ITA	Leo Fasan	18	0	13+0	0	3+0	0	1+0	0	1+0	0
2	DF	(Scotland) SCO	Lewis Kidd	20	0	12+4	0	2+0	0	1+0	0	1+0	0
3	DF	(Scotland) SCO	Jordan McGhee	38	4	32+1	4	3+0	0	1+0	0	1+0	0
5	DF	(France) FRA	William Edjenguélé	12	1	12+0	1	0+0	0	0+0	0	0+0	0
6	MF	(Northern Ireland) NIR	Paul Paton	35	2	27+2	1	3+0	0	1+0	1	2+0	0
7	MF	(Lithuania) LTU	Deimantas Petravičius	35	4	26+2	3	4+0	1	1+0	0	1+1	0
8	MF	(Bulgaria) BUL	Nikolay Todorov	7	0	1+6	0	0+0	0	0+0	0	0+0	0
9	FW	(England) ENG	Aaron Jarvis	12	0	4+8	0	0+0	0	0+0	0	0+0	0
10	MF	(England) ENG	Davis Keillor-Dunn	11	3	7+4	3	0+0	0	0+0	0	0+0	0
11	MF	(Scotland) SCO	Ross MacLean	15	0	8+7	0	0+0	0	0+0	0	0+0	0
12	GK	(Scotland) SCO	David Mitchell	9	0	8+1	0	0+0	0	0+0	0	0+0	0
14	DF	(England) ENG	Thomas Robson	26	0	16+5	0	2+0	0	1+0	0	2+0	0
16	MF	(Scotland) SCO	Ian McShane	16	3	16+0	3	0+0	0	0+0	0	0+0	0
18	DF	(England) ENG	Patrick Brough	21	0	16+0	0	3+0	0	1+0	0	1+0	0
19	MF	(Scotland) SCO	Zak Rudden	31	12	29+2	12	0+0	0	0+0	0	0+0	0
20	FW	(Scotland) SCO	Kevin O'Hara	22	0	5+13	0	0+3	0	0+0	0	1+0	0
21	MF	(Ghana) GHA	Abdul Osman	15	2	15+0	0	0+0	2	0+0	0	0+0	0
23	DF	(Scotland) SCO	Paul Dixon	16	0	16+0	0	0+0	0	0+0	0	0+0	0
24	FW	(Northern Ireland) NIR	Shayne Lavery	6	0	0+6	0	0+0	0	0+0	0	0+0	0
25	MF	(Scotland) SCO	Andy Irving	21	0	13+6	0	0+0	0	1+0	0	1+0	0
27	MF	(England) ENG	Mark Waddington	14	1	8+6	1	0+0	0	0+0	0	0+0	0
28	DF	(Scotland) SCO	Ciaran McKenna	17	2	17+0	2	0+0	0	0+0	0	0+0	0
31	GK	(Scotland) SCO	Robbie Mutch	2	0	0+0	0	1+0	0	0+0	0	1+0	0
32	DF	(Scotland) SCO	Marky Munro	0	0	0+0	0	0+0	0	0+0	0	0+0	0
35	MF	(Scotland) SCO	Cieran Dunne	2	0	0+1	0	0+0	0	0+0	0	0+1	0
36	MF	(Scotland) SCO	Jason Jarvis	2	0	0+1	0	0+0	0	0+0	0	0+1	0
41	MF	(Scotland) SCO	Aidan Laverty	1	0	0+1	0	0+0	0	0+0	0	0+0	0
43	GK	(England) ENG	Harry Burgoyne	15	0	15+0	0	0+0	0	0+0	0	0+0	0
Players who left the club during the 2018–19 season
4	DF	(Scotland) SCO	Aaron Muirhead	23	2	16+1	1	3+0	0	1+0	1	2+0	0
5	DF	(England) ENG	Tom Dallison	17	0	10+2	0	3+0	0	0+1	0	1+0	0
8	MF	(Scotland) SCO	Ruben Sammut	16	0	9+3	0	3+0	0	0+1	0	0+0	0
9	FW	(England) ENG	Dennon Lewis	23	2	8+8	0	3+1	1	1+0	0	2+0	1
10	MF	(Wales) WAL	Tom Owen-Evans	7	0	2+0	0	2+2	0	0+0	0	1+0	0
11	MF	(Greece) GRE	Dimitris Froxylias	8	0	1+3	0	1+1	0	0+0	0	1+1	0
15	DF	(England) ENG	Scott Harrison	20	3	14+1	2	3+0	0	0+0	0	2+0	1
16	FW	(England) ENG	Dan Turner	4	0	0+0	0	2+2	0	0+0	0	0+0	0
16	DF	(Sierra Leone) SLE	Mustapha Dumbuya	0	0	0+0	0	0+0	0	0+0	0	0+0	0
17	MF	(Ghana) GHA	Prince Buaben	7	0	7+0	0	0+0	0	0+0	0	0+0	0
21	FW	(Scotland) SCO	Dylan Mackin	8	2	1+2	0	3+1	2	0+0	0	0+1	0
22	MF	(Scotland) SCO	Joe McKee	12	3	9+1	2	0+0	0	1+0	1	1+0	0
23	MF	(England) ENG	Rees Greenwood	5	1	0+3	1	0+1	0	0+0	0	0+1	0
24	FW	(Canada) CAN	Marcus Haber	17	0	6+9	0	0+1	0	0+0	0	1+0	0
26	MF	(Scotland) SCO	Mark Russell	4	0	2+1	0	0+0	0	0+0	0	0+1	0

== Club statistics ==
=== League table ===
Pos	Team	Pld	W	D	L	GF	GA	GD	Pts	Promotion, qualification or relegation
6	Partick Thistle	36	12	7	17	43	52	−9	43	
7	Dunfermline Athletic	36	11	8	17	33	40	−7	41	
8	Alloa Athletic	36	10	9	17	39	53	−14	39	
9	Queen of the South (O)	36	9	11	16	41	48	−7	38	Qualification for the Championship play-offs
10	Falkirk (R)	36	9	11	16	37	49	−12	38	Relegation to League One

Source: SPFL
Rules for classification: 1) Points; 2) Goal difference; 3) Goals scored; 4) Points in head-to-head matches; 5) Goal difference in hth matches; 6). Goals scored in hth matches; 7). Play-off (only for deciding promotion, play-off participation and relegation).
(O) Play-off winners; (R) Relegated

=== Division summary ===
Round	1	2	3	4	5	6	7	8	9	10	11	12	13	14	15	16	17	18	19	20	21	22	23	24	25	26	27	28	29	30	31	32	33	34	35	36
Ground	H	A	H	A	A	H	A	H	A	A	H	H	A	H	A	H	H	A	A	A	A	H	H	A	H	A	H	A	H	A	A	H	A	H	A	H
Result	L	L	L	L	L	L	W	L	L	L	D	L	W	D	W	D	D	L	L	W	D	D	W	W	D	D	W	L	D	D	D	L	W	L	L	W
Position	9	9	10	10	10	10	10	10	10	10	10	10	10	10	9	10	10	10	10	9	9	10	8	8	9	8	8	8	8	9	8	10	9	10	10	10

Updated to match(es) played on 4 May 2019. Source:
A = Away; H = Home; W = Win; D = Draw; L = Loss

== Transfers ==
=== Players in ===
Player	From	Fee
(England) Tom Dallison	(England) Brighton & Hove Albion	Free
(England) Patrick Brough	(England) Morecambe	Free
(England) Dennon Lewis	(England) Watford	Free
(England) Scott Harrison	(England) Hartlepool United	Free
(Italy) Leo Fasan	(Scotland) Kilmarnock	Free
(Wales) Tom Owen-Evans	(Wales) Newport County	Free
(Lithuania) Deimantas Petravičius	(Scotland) Motherwell	Free
(Greece) Dimitris Froxylias	(Scotland) Dumbarton	Free
(Northern Ireland) Paul Paton	(England) Plymouth Argyle	Free
(Scotland) Dylan Mackin	(Scotland) Livingston	Undisclosed
(England) Rees Greenwood	(England) Gateshead	Free
(Scotland) Mark Russell	(Scotland) Greenock Morton	Free
(Ghana) Prince Buaben	Free Agent	Free
(Sierra Leone) Mustapha Dumbuya	Free Agent	Free
(Scotland) Paul Dixon	(England) Grimsby Town	Free
(Ghana) Abdul Osman	Free Agent	Free
(Scotland) Ian McShane	(Scotland) St Mirren	Free
(Scotland) Ross MacLean	(Scotland) Motherwell	Free
(Scotland) Ciaran McKenna	(United States) Duke Blue Devils	Free
(Bulgaria) Nikolay Todorov	(Italy) Rieti	Free

=== Players out ===
Player	To	Fee
(Scotland) Craig Sibbald	(Scotland) Livingston	Free
(Scotland) Robbie Thomson	(Scotland) Raith Rovers	Free
(Scotland) Cameron Blues	(Scotland) Livingston	Free
(Scotland) Rory Loy	(Scotland) Dumbarton	Free
(England) Tom Taiwo	(Scotland) Hamilton Academical	Free
(Scotland) Peter Grant	(England) Plymouth Argyle	Free
(Scotland) Sean Welsh	(Scotland) Inverness CT	Free
(Scotland) Reis Peggie	(Scotland) Alloa Athletic	Free
(Scotland) Paul Watson	(Scotland) Dundee United	Free
(Scotland) Alex Harris	(England) York City	Free
(Greece) Dimitris Froxylias	Released	Free
(Scotland) Dylan Mackin	(Scotland) Stirling Albion	Free
(Wales) Tom Owen-Evans	(England) Hereford	Free
(England) Tom Dallison	(England) Crawley Town	Free
(Ghana) Prince Buaben	Released	Free
(Sierra Leone) Mustapha Dumbuya	(United States) Phoenix Rising	Free
(Scotland) Aaron Muirhead	(Scotland) Ayr United	Free
(England) Dennon Lewis	(England) Bromley	Free
(Scotland) Mark Russell	(Republic of Ireland) Finn Harps	Free

=== Loans in ===
Player	From	Fee
(Scotland) Ruben Sammut	(England) Chelsea	Loan
(England) Dan Turner	(England) Port Vale	Loan
(Canada) Marcus Haber	(Scotland) Dundee	Loan
(Scotland) Andy Irving	(Scotland) Heart of Midlothian	Loan
(Scotland) Zak Rudden	(Scotland) Rangers	Loan
(England) Mark Waddington	(England) Stoke City	Loan
(Northern Ireland) Shayne Lavery	(England) Everton	Loan
(England) Davis Keillor-Dunn	(Scotland) Ross County	Loan
(England) Harry Burgoyne	(England) Wolverhampton Wanderers	Loan
(France) William Edjenguélé	(Scotland) Dundee United	Loan
(England) Aaron Jarvis	(England) Luton Town	Loan

=== Loans out ===
Player	To	Fee
(Scotland) Kevin O'Hara	(Scotland) Stenhousemuir	Loan
(England) Scott Harrison	(England) Spennymoor Town	Loan
(Scotland) Joe McKee	(Republic of Ireland) Dundalk	Loan

== See also ==
- List of Falkirk F.C. seasons
