= Ciaran McKenna =

Scottish footballer

Personal information
- Full name: Ciaran Paul McKenna
- Date of birth: 25 March 1998 (age 28)
- Place of birth: Glasgow, Scotland
- Height: 6 ft 4 in (1.93 m)
- Positions: Centre back; right back

Team information
- Current team: Alqueries CF

Youth career
- 2006–2015: Celtic

College career
Years	Team	Apps	(Gls)
2015–2018	Duke Blue Devils	42	(4)

Senior career*
Years	Team	Apps	(Gls)
2017	Jacksonville Armada U-23	?	(?)
2019	Falkirk	17	(2)
2019–2020	Hamilton Academical	4	(0)
2020–2022	Partick Thistle	34	(1)
2022–2023	Queen of the South	22	(0)
2023–	Alqueries CF		
- * Club domestic league appearances and goals as of 17:03, 3 August 2025 (UTC)

Ciaran Paul McKenna (born 25 March 1998) is a former Scottish professional footballer who now plays part time as a centre back or right back for Zurich City, in Switzerland's 2. Liga Interregional (5th division). McKenna has previously played for Falkirk, Hamilton Academical, Partick Thistle and Queen of the South.

During his playing career in Scotland, McKenna was co-host of the podcast BroPod, alongside college and Hamilton Academical teammate Markus Fjortoft. The podcast centred around conversations with individuals from the realms of sports, media, finance, and politics. Guests included world-renowned journalists, broadcasters, club owners, agents, CEO's and Ballon d'Or winners. Additionally, while playing, McKenna began a master's degree in Economics of Sustainability, which he has now completed.

== Early life ==
McKenna was born in Glasgow and was educated at Cardinal Newman High School, Bellshill, and St Ninian's High School, Kirkintilloch. McKenna played in the Celtic Academy, before turning down the offer of a three-year professional contract with the club, to accept the offer of a scholarship with Duke University in North Carolina, where he competed in college soccer in the NCAA Division 1. After three and a half years at Duke University, McKenna graduated in December 2018 with a bachelor's degree in political science.

== Club career ==
=== Early career ===
McKenna had 42 appearances with the Duke Blue Devils over three seasons and scored two goals. McKenna also spent a spell during 2017 playing for Jacksonville Armada U-23 in the National Premier Soccer League.

=== Falkirk ===
In January 2019, McKenna joined Falkirk. McKenna had 17 league appearances and scored two goals in his debut season as a professional with the Bairns.

=== Hamilton Academical ===
In June 2019, McKenna joined Hamilton Academical and had four league appearances and also four League Cup matches for the Accies.

=== Partick Thistle ===
In August 2020, McKenna joined Partick Thistle on a two-year contract. McKenna had 34 league appearances and scored one goal, as well as 14 cup matches for the Harry Wraggs.

=== Queen of the South ===
On 24 June 2022, McKenna joined Queen of the South on a one-year contract.

McKenna was released by the Doonhamers at the end of the 2022-23 season.

=== Alqueries CF ===
In 2023, McKenna signed for Spanish club Alqueries CF.

=== Zurich City ===
In 2025, McKenna signed for Swiss semi-professional club Zurich City.

== Personal life ==
In June 2022, McKenna, married Jamaica Women's national team player Kayla McCoy in Oak Park, Illinois, USA. The pair met in college.

In early 2016, McKenna was falsely accused of sexual assault by a fellow student at Duke University. Initially, the university issued a six-semester suspension, but upon appeal by McKenna, it was concluded that the original panel had not applied the correct standard pursuant to Duke policy. A lawsuit was filed on Mckenna's behalf alleging due process violations, and in February 2017, Durham Judge Orlando Hudson issued a permanent injunction preventing Duke from suspending McKenna. In July 2018, McKenna and Duke settled the case outside of court, and in December 2018 McKenna graduated. Although the terms of the settlement are unknown, it is reported that McKenna made a six-figure donation to the Duke Law Wrongful Convictions Clinic shortly afterwards, as a gesture of gratitude to the co-director of the clinic and Duke Law Professor James E. Coleman, who had vigorously fought on McKenna's behalf.

== Career statistics ==
As of 7 May 2023

Appearances and goals by club, season and competition
Club	Season	League			Scottish Cup		Scottish League Cup		Other		Total	
Club	Season	Division	Apps	Goals	Apps	Goals	Apps	Goals	Apps	Goals	Apps	Goals
Falkirk	2018–19	Scottish Championship	17	2	0	0	0	0	0	0	17	2
Hamilton Academical	2019-20	Scottish Premiership	3	0	0	0	4	0	0	0	7	0
Hamilton Academical	2020–21	Scottish Premiership	1	0	0	0	0	0	0	0	1	0
Hamilton Academical	Total		4	0	0	0	4	0	0	0	8	0
Partick Thistle	2020-21	Scottish League One	11	0	0	0	3	0	2	0	16	0
Partick Thistle	2021-22	Scottish Championship	23	1	2	0	4	0	3	0	32	1
Partick Thistle	Total		34	1	2	0	7	0	5	0	48	1
Queen of the South	2022-23	Scottish League One	22	0	1	0	5	0	4	1	32	1
Career total			77	3	3	0	16	0	9	1	105	4

== Honours ==
=== Club ===
Partick Thistle

- Scottish League One: 2020–21
