= Ewan Bange =

English footballer

Personal information
- Full name: Ewan Bange
- Date of birth: 15 December 2001 (age 24)
- Height: 1.93 m (6 ft 4 in)
- Position: Striker

Team information
- Current team: Bamber Bridge

Youth career
- –2019: Blackpool

Senior career*
Years	Team	Apps	(Gls)
2019	Blackpool	0	(0)
2021	→ Bamber Bridge (loan)	16	(9)
2021–2022	→ AFC Telford United (loan)	6	(0)
2022	→ F.C. United of Manchester (loan)	10	(1)
2022	→ Queen of the South (loan)	5	(1)
2023–	Radcliffe		
2023–2024	→ Bamber Bridge (loan)		
2024–2025	→ Hyde United (loan)	1	(1)
2025–	Bamber Bridge		(15)
- * Club domestic league appearances and goals as of 09:12 12 April 2026 (UTC)

Ewan Bange (born 15 December 2001) is an English professional footballer who plays as a striker for Bamber Bridge.

== Career ==
=== Blackpool ===
Having made his debut for Blackpool's youth team in 2017, Bange's first involvement with the first team was as an unused substitute in a 0–0 League One draw away at Bolton Wanderers. He made his first-team debut on 15 October 2019, coming on as a second-half substitute in a 2–1 EFL Trophy defeat away at Carlisle United.

Bange signed a professional contract with Blackpool on 23 December 2020.

==== Bamber Bridge ====
On 13 August 2021, Bange joined for Bamber Bridge on loan. He scored eleven goals in all competitions.

==== AFC Telford ====
In November 2021, upon expiration of his Bamber Bridge loan, Bange joined AFC Telford United, also on loan, until January 2022. He returned to Blackpool on 13 January.

==== FC United of Manchester ====
In January 2022 he went out on loan for the third time in the season, this time to F.C. United of Manchester.

==== Queen of the South (Loan spell) ====
On 1 September 2022, Bange signed a four-month loan deal for Scottish League One club Queen of the South, after being recommended by Stephen Dobbie, who is the current Senior Professional Development Phase Coach at the Seasiders.

==== Radcliffe ====
On 31 January 2023, Bange signed for Radcliffe.

==== Bamber Bridge ====
In 2025 he rejoined Bamber Bridge.

== Career statistics ==
As of 15 January 2023

Appearances and goals by club, season and competition
Club	Season	League			FA Cup		League Cup		Other		Total	
Club	Season	Division	Apps	Goals	Apps	Goals	Apps	Goals	Apps	Goals	Apps	Goals
Blackpool	2019–20	League One	0	0	0	0	0	0	1 (Note: Appearance(s) in the Football League Trophy)	0	1	0
Blackpool	2020–21	League One	0	0	0	0	0	0	0	0	0	0
Blackpool	2021–22	Championship	0	0	—		0	0	—		0	0
Blackpool	Total		0	0	0	0	0	0	1	0	1	0
Bamber Bridge (loan)	2021–22	NPL Premier Division	16	9	2	1	—		1 (Note: Appearance(s) in the FA Trophy)	0	19	10
AFC Telford United (loan)	2021–22	National League North	6	0	—		—		—		6	0
F.C. United of Manchester (loan)	2021–22	NPL Premier Division	10	1	—		—		—		10	1
Queen of the South (loan)	2022-23	Scottish League One	5	1	0	0	0	0	1	6	1	
Career total			37	11	2	1	0	0	3	0	42	12
