= Connor Murray =

Scottish footballer (born 1997)

Personal information
- Date of birth: 24 April 1997 (age 29)
- Place of birth: Glasgow, Scotland
- Height: 1.73 m (5 ft 8 in)
- Position: Midfielder

Team information
- Current team: Coleraine
- Number: 10

Youth career
- 2012–2015: St Mirren

Senior career*
Years	Team	Apps	(Gls)
2015–2020	Queen of the South	68	(4)
2016–2017	→ Gretna 2008 (loan)	9	(2)
2020–2022	Partick Thistle	38	(4)
2022–2023	Queen of the South	33	(7)
2023–2025	Hamilton Academical	21	(3)
2024–2025	→ Coleraine (loan)	30	(3)
2025-	Coleraine	1	(0)
- * Club domestic league appearances and goals as of 29 April 2026

Connor Murray (born 24 April 1997) is a Scottish footballer who plays as a midfielder for NIFL Premiership club Coleraine on loan from Scottish League One club Hamilton Academical. Murray has had two spells with Queen of the South and has also played for Partick Thistle and Hamilton Academical as well as a loan spell with Gretna 2008.

== Career ==
=== Queen of The South (First spell) ===
Murray started his career going through St Mirren's youth academy before signing for Queen of the South in the close season of 2015. Murray was then loaned out to Gretna 2008 on a development loan deal during the first half of the 2016–17 season to gain first-team experience. Murray played in 13 games and scored a brace in a 5–3 win versus Preston Athletic.

After returning to the Doonhamers, Murray appeared for his debut as an 89th-minute substitute versus St Mirren at the Paisley 2021 Stadium in a 3–0 win on 7 January 2017. On 28 October 2017, Murray was named as sponsor's man-of-the-match in Queens 4–2 home win over Falkirk. On 21 April 2018, he scored his first goal for the Doonhamers in a 3–0 home win versus Dundee United, having appeared as a substitute minutes before and scoring Queens third goal in the 77th minute with his first touch. Murray's current contract was to expire at the end of May 2018, but he extended his contract to remain with Queens until the end of the 2018-19 season on 30 April 2018. He signed a new one-year contract on 29 May 2019.

=== Partick Thistle ===
On 24 July 2020, Murray signed a two-year contract with Scottish League One club Partick Thistle. Murray scored his first goal for the club, scoring the winner from a corner, six minutes into a 1–0 win away to Montrose in Scottish League One.

Murray scored his first goal of the 2021–22 season in a 6–1 away win over Hamilton Academical in the Scottish Championship.

=== Queen of the South (Second spell) ===
On 13 June 2022, Murray returned to the Doonhamers, signing a one-year contract with a further 12 month option, after leaving the Harry Wraggs.

Murray was released by the Doonhamers at the end of the 2022-23 season.

=== Hamilton Academical ===
On 4 July 2023, Murray signed a one-year contract with Hamilton Academical.

==== Loan to Coleraine ====
On 30 August 2024, Murray moved on a half-season loan to Coleraine in Northern Ireland.

== Career statistics ==
As of 22 February 2025

Appearances and goals by club, season and competition
Club	Season	League			National cup (Note: Includes Scottish Cup, Irish Cup)		League cup (Note: Includes Scottish League Cup, Irish League Cup)		Other		Total	
Club	Season	Division	Apps	Goals	Apps	Goals	Apps	Goals	Apps	Goals	Apps	Goals
Queen of the South
Queen of the South	2016–17	Scottish Championship	8	0	0	0	0	0	1 (Note: Appearances in Scottish League Challenge Cup)	0	9	0
Queen of the South	2017–18	Scottish Championship	20	1	3	0	4	0	4	0	31	1
Queen of the South	2018–19	Scottish Championship	21	1	3	0	1	0	5 (Note: One appearance in the Scottish League Challenge Cup, four appearances and two goals in the Championship Play-offs)	2	30	3
Queen of the South	2019–20	Scottish Championship	19	2	1	1	4	2	1	1	25	6
Queen of the South	2022–23	Scottish League One	33	7	1	0	5	2	2	1	41	10
Queen of the South	Total		101	11	8	1	14	4	13	4	136	20
Partick Thistle
Partick Thistle	2020–21	Scottish League One	20	3	2	1	4	0	0	0	26	4
Partick Thistle	2021–22	Scottish Championship	18	1	2	0	4	0	3 (Note: Two appearances in the Scottish League Challenge Cup, one appearance in Premiership play-offs)	0	27	1
Partick Thistle	Total		38	4	4	1	8	0	3	0	53	5
Gretna 2008 (loan)	2016–17	Lowland Football League	9	2	3	0	2	0	1	0	15	2
Hamilton Academical	2023–24	Scottish League One	20	3	0	0	4	0	4 (Note: Two appearances and one goal in the Scottish League Challenge Cup, two appearances in the Championship play-offs)	1	28	4
Hamilton Academical	2024–25	Scottish Championship	1	0	0	0	4	0	0	0	5	0
Hamilton Academical	Total		21	3	0	0	8	0	4	1	34	4
Colerain (loan)	2024–25	NIFL Premiership	30	3	2	0	1	0	0	0	33	3
Career total			199	23	17	2	33	4	21	5	270	34

== Honours ==
=== Club ===
Partick Thistle

- Scottish League One: 2020–21
