= Zak Rudden =

Scottish footballer (born 2000)

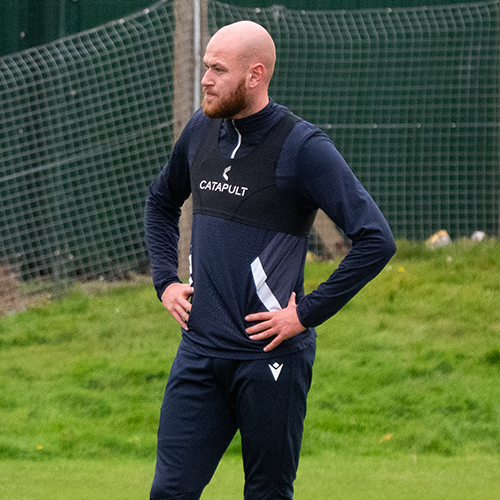
- Rudden training with Dundee in 2023

Personal information
- Full name: Zak Andrew Rudden
- Date of birth: 6 February 2000 (age 26)
- Place of birth: Edinburgh, Scotland
- Height: 6 ft 2 in (1.87 m)
- Position: Striker

Team information
- Current team: Dunfermline Athletic
- Number: 9

Youth career
- Rangers

Senior career*
Years	Team	Apps	(Gls)
2018–2020	Rangers	0	(0)
2018–2019	→ Falkirk (loan)	31	(12)
2019–2020	→ Plymouth Argyle (loan)	14	(2)
2020–2022	Partick Thistle	36	(14)
2022	→ Dundee (loan)	13	(1)
2022–2024	Dundee	33	(7)
2023	→ St Johnstone (loan)	12	(1)
2024	→ Raith Rovers (loan)	14	(3)
2024–2025	Queen's Park	34	(9)
2025	Livingston	1	(0)
2025–	Dunfermline Athletic	15	(2)

International career^{‡}
2014	Scotland U16	2	(0)
2015–2017	Scotland U17	12	(2)
2017–2019	Scotland U19	14	(6)
2021	Scotland U21	3	(0)
- * Club domestic league appearances and goals as of 18:30, 31 October 2026 (UTC) ‡ National team caps and goals as of 18:22, 27 March 2022 (UTC)

Zak Andrew Rudden (born 6 February 2000) is a Scottish professional footballer who plays as a striker for Scottish Championship club Dunfermline Athletic. He has previously been a player for Rangers, Partick Thistle, Dundee and Queen's Park, and has had loan spells at Falkirk, Plymouth Argyle, Dundee, St Johnstone, Raith Rovers and Livingston.

== Club career ==
=== Rangers ===
Born in Edinburgh, Rudden began his career with Rangers and joined the first-team for pre-season before the start of the 2018–19 season for the first time.

=== Loans ===
In August 2018, Rudden moved out on loan to Falkirk. On 15 September 2018, Rudden scored on his debut for Falkirk.

On 23 August 2019 Rudden moved on loan to EFL League Two side Plymouth Argyle. He made his debut for the club the next day, as a first half substitute in a 3–0 win over Walsall, and scored his first goal for the club in an EFL Trophy tie against Swindon Town on 8 October 2019. The loan ended in January 2020.

=== Partick Thistle ===
On 15 January 2020 Rudden signed for Partick Thistle on a two-and-a-half-year deal.

After multiple injury problems and the shutdown of football due to COVID-19, Rudden scored his first Thistle goal on 23 March 2021 in a 3–0 win at home over Cowdenbeath in the Scottish Cup.

In April 2021, Rudden scored his first and second league goals for Thistle in a 2–0 home win against Clyde.

=== Dundee ===
In January 2022 he signed a pre-contract agreement with Dundee on a three-year deal, starting in summer 2022. On 31 January 2022, Rudden joined Dundee on loan until the end of the season. He made his debut the following day as a substitute in the Dundee derby, and scored his first goal for the club four days later against Ross County.

After officially joining Dundee permanently the following season, Rudden scored his first goal of the season in a home league win over Arbroath.

On 31 January 2023, Rudden joined St Johnstone on loan until the end of the season. On 25 February Rudden scored his first goal for the Saintees in a draw against St Mirren.

Following his return from loan at St Johnstone, Rudden scored the winner in Dundee's first competitive game of the 2023–24 season, coming in the League Cup against Bonnyrigg Rose. On 23 September, Rudden came off the bench on for 10-man Dundee and scored a late equaliser against Kilmarnock.

On 26 January 2024, Rudden joined Scottish Championship club Raith Rovers on loan until the end of the season. He made his debut the following day in a league game at home against Inverness Caledonian Thistle. Rudden scored his first goal for the Fifers in the following league game, in a sold-out title-chasing win over his parent club's rivals Dundee United.

On 12 July 2024, Dundee announced that Rudden had departed the club after both parties mutually agreed to terminate his contract.

=== Queen's Park ===
The day after departing Dundee, Rudden signed for Scottish Championship club Queen's Park on a two-year deal. Rudden made his debut for the Spiders on the same day, and scored his first goal for the club in a 0–5 away victory over Peterhead in the Scottish League Cup group stage.

=== Livingston ===
On 12 June 2025, it was announced that Rudden had signed for Scottish Premiership club Livingston.

=== Dunfermline Athletic ===
On 28 August 2025, less than three months after signing for Livingston, Rudden signed for Scottish Championship club Dunfermline Athletic on a two-year deal. Rudden made his debut on 30 August and scored his first goal for the club in a draw against Ross County. After suffering an injury in February 2026, Rudden returned for the final game of the season as a substitute for the Pars in the 2026 Scottish Cup final.

== International career ==
Rudden has represented Scotland at youth international levels, up to and including under-21.

== Career statistics ==
As of match played 5 September 2026

Appearances and goals by club, season and competition
Club	Season	League			National Cup		League Cup		Other		Total	
Club	Season	Division	Apps	Goals	Apps	Goals	Apps	Goals	Apps	Goals	Apps	Goals
Rangers U20	2016–17	SPFL Development League	—		—		—		2 (Note: Appearance(s) in the Scottish Challenge Cup.)	0	2	0
Rangers U20	2017–18	SPFL Development League	—		—		—		1	0	1	0
Rangers U20	2018–19	SPFL Development League	—		—		—		1	1	1	1
Rangers U20	Total		0	0	0	0	0	0	4	1	4	1
Rangers	2018–19	Scottish Premiership	0	0	0	0	0	0	0	0	0	0
Rangers	2019–20	Scottish Premiership	0	0	0	0	0	0	0	0	0	0
Rangers	Total		0	0	0	0	0	0	0	0	0	0
Falkirk (loan)	2018–19	Scottish Championship	31	12	0	0	0	0	0	0	31	12
Plymouth Argyle (loan)	2019–20	EFL League Two	14	2	1	0	1	0	2 (Note: Appearance(s) in the Football League Trophy.)	1	18	3
Partick Thistle	2019–20	Scottish Championship	4	0	0	0	0	0	0	0	4	0
Partick Thistle	2020–21	Scottish League One	13	6	2	1	2	0	0	0	17	7
Partick Thistle	2021–22	Scottish Championship	19	7	2	0	4	2	1	0	26	9
Partick Thistle	Total		36	13	4	1	6	2	1	0	47	16
Dundee (loan)	2021–22	Scottish Premiership	13	1	—		—		0	0	13	1
Dundee	2022–23	Scottish Championship	19	5	2	1	3	0	3	2	27	8
Dundee	2023–24	Scottish Premiership	14	2	0	0	2	1	0	0	16	3
Dundee	Total		33	7	2	1	5	1	3	2	43	11
St Johnstone (loan)	2022–23	Scottish Premiership	12	1	0	0	—		0	0	12	1
Raith Rovers (loan)	2023–24	Scottish Championship	14	3	—		—		3 (Note: One appearance in the Scottish Challenge Cup, two appearances in the Premiership play-offs)	0	17	3
Queen's Park	2024–25	Scottish Championship	34	9	4	2	5	1	4	3	47	15
Livingston	2025–26	Scottish Premiership	1	0	0	0	4	1	0	0	5	1
Dunfermline Athletic	2025–26	Scottish Championship	8	2	3	0	—		1	0	12	2
Dunfermline Athletic	2026–27	Scottish Championship	4	0	0	0	4	0	0	0	8	0
Dunfermline Athletic	Total		12	2	3	0	4	0	1	0	20	2
Career total			200	50	14	4	25	5	18	7	257	66

== Honours ==
=== Club ===
Partick Thistle

- Scottish League One: 2020–21

Dundee

- Scottish Championship: 2022–23

Queen's Park

- Scottish Challenge Cup runner-up: 2024–25
