= Kevin Dąbrowski =

Polish footballer

Personal information
- Full name: Kevin Maciej Dąbrowski
- Date of birth: 9 June 1998 (age 28)
- Place of birth: Poznań, Poland
- Height: 1.97 m (6 ft 6 in)
- Position: Goalkeeper

Team information
- Current team: Pogoń Szczecin
- Number: 98

Youth career
- –2013: Ostrovia 1909 Ostrów Wielkopolski
- 2013–2014: Lech Poznań

Senior career*
Years	Team	Apps	(Gls)
2014–2017	Lech Poznań II	3	(0)
2016	→ Warta Międzychód (loan)	7	(0)
2017–2023	Hibernian	6	(0)
2018	→ Berwick Rangers (loan)	0	(0)
2018	→ Civil Service Strollers (loan)		
2019–2020	→ Cowdenbeath (loan)	12	(0)
2020–2021	→ Dumbarton (loan)	8	(0)
2023	→ Queen of the South (loan)	13	(0)
2023–2025	Raith Rovers	56	(0)
2025–2026	Košice	15	(0)
2026–	Pogoń Szczecin	0	(0)
- * Club domestic league appearances and goals as of 18:43, 14 September 2026 (UTC)

Kevin Maciej Dąbrowski (born 9 June 1998) is a Polish professional footballer who plays as a goalkeeper for Ekstraklasa club Pogoń Szczecin.

Dąbrowski started his senior career with Hibernian and has also had loan spells with Berwick Rangers, Civil Service Strollers, Cowdenbeath, Dumbarton and Queen of the South. In 2023, he moved to Raith Rovers.

== Club career ==
=== Hibernian ===
Dąbrowski came through the youth systems at Ostrovia 1909 Ostrów Wielkopolski and Lech Poznań II, before he signed for Scottish club Hibernian in the summer of 2017.

Dąbrowski was loaned out to Berwick Rangers in September 2018, returning to Hibs in October 2018. He was then loaned to Civil Service Strollers for a short period in November 2018.

He signed for Cowdenbeath on loan for the first part of the 2019–20 season. He earned a man of the match award, and praise from the opposition manager Craig Levein, for his performance in a League Cup match against Hearts in July 2019. On 8 September 2020, he joined Dumbarton on loan for the remainder of the season, but was recalled by Hibs in January 2021. On 27 April 2021, Dąbrowski signed a two-year contract extension at Hibs.

On 1 February 2022, Dąbrowski debuted for Hibs first-team in a goalless draw with their Edinburgh derby rivals Hearts.

Dąbrowski suffered a shoulder injury in August 2022, which prompted the Easter Road club to sign Ryan Schofield on a loan deal. He was loaned out to League One club Queen of the South in January 2023 and was released by Hibs at the end of the 2022–23 season.

=== Raith Rovers ===
Dąbrowski signed a two-year contract with Scottish Championship side Raith Rovers in June 2023. He was released from the club at the end of the 2024–25 season.

=== Košice ===
On 27 November 2025, Dąbrowski signed with Slovak First Football League club Košice. On 29 November, Dąbrowski made his debut for Košice, saving a penalty from Jan Hladík in stoppage time of a 1–1 away draw with Ružomberok. On 6 December, he helped his club win 2–0 against Slovan Bratislava at Košická futbalová aréna. On 15 January 2026, Dąbrowski signed a new contract with Košice until the end of the season, with an option for another year which was exercised in May 2026.

=== Pogoń Szczecin ===
On 9 September 2026, Dąbrowski returned to Poland to join Ekstraklasa club Pogoń Szczecin on a two-year contract, with an option for another year.

== Career statistics ==
As of match played 1 August 2026

Appearances and goals by club, season and competition
Club	Season	League			National cup (Note: Includes Scottish FA Cup)		League cup (Note: Includes Scottish League Cup)		Other		Total	
Club	Season	Division	Apps	Goals	Apps	Goals	Apps	Goals	Apps	Goals	Apps	Goals
Lech Poznań II	2014–15	III liga, gr. C	3	0	—		—		—		3	0
Lech Poznań II	2016–17	III liga, gr. II	4	0	—		—		—		4	0
Lech Poznań II	Total		7	0	—		—		—		7	0
Warta Międzychód (loan)	2015–16	IV liga Greater Poland	7	0	—		—		—		7	0
Hibernian	2017–18	Scottish Premiership	0	0	0	0	0	0	0	0	0	0
Hibernian	2018–19	Scottish Premiership	0	0	0	0	0	0	0	0	0	0
Hibernian	2019–20	Scottish Premiership	0	0	0	0	0	0	0	0	0	0
Hibernian	2020–21	Scottish Premiership	0	0	0	0	0	0	0	0	0	0
Hibernian	2021–22	Scottish Premiership	6	0	0	0	0	0	0	0	6	0
Hibernian	2022–23	Scottish Premiership	0	0	0	0	1	0	0	0	1	0
Hibernian	Total		6	0	0	0	1	0	0	0	7	0
Berwick Rangers (loan)	2018–19	Scottish League Two	0	0	0	0	0	0	0	0	0	0
Cowdenbeath (loan)	2019–20	Scottish League Two	12	0	1	0	4	0	1	0	18	0
Dumbarton (loan)	2020–21	Scottish League One	8	0	0	0	4	0	0	0	12	0
Queen of the South (loan)	2022–23	Scottish League One	13	0	0	0	0	0	1	0	14	0
Raith Rovers	2023–24	Scottish Championship	34	0	2	0	5	0	8 (Note: Four appearances in Championship play-offs, four appearances in Scottish Challenge Cup)	0	49	0
Raith Rovers	2024–25	Scottish Championship	22	0	2	0	4	0	1 (Note: Appearance in Scottish Challenge Cup)	0	29	0
Raith Rovers	Total		56	0	4	0	9	0	9	0	78	0
Košice	2025–26	Slovak First Football League	13	0	0	0	—		—		13	0
Košice	2026–27	Slovak First Football League	2	0	—		—		—		2	0
Košice	Total		15	0	0	0	—		—		15	0
Pogoń Szczecin	2026–27	Ekstraklasa	0	0	—		—		—		0	0
Career total			124	0	5	0	18	0	11	0	158	0

== Honours ==
Warta Międzychód

- IV liga Greater Poland North: 2015–16
