= Ross Docherty =

Scottish footballer (born 1993)

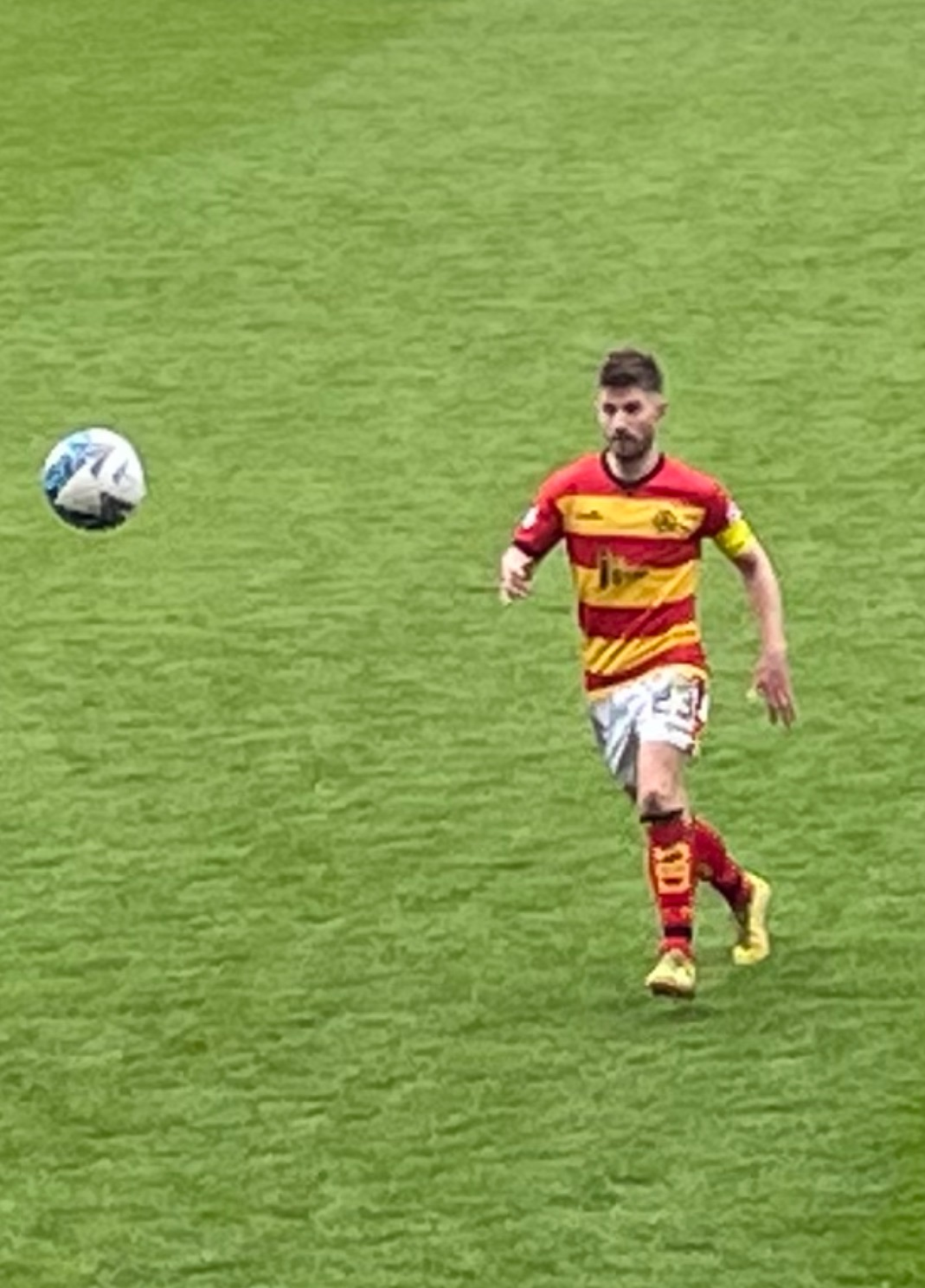

Personal information
- Date of birth: 23 January 1993 (age 33)
- Place of birth: Paisley, Scotland
- Position: Defensive midfielder

Team information
- Current team: Ross County
- Number: 23

Youth career
- Hillwood Swifts
- 2010–2011: Livingston

Senior career*
| Years | Team | Apps | (Gls) |
| 2011–2014 | Livingston | 30 | (0) |
| 2014–2015 | Airdrieonians | 22 | (0) |
| 2015–2020 | Ayr United | 112 | (4) |
| 2020–2023 | Partick Thistle | 79 | (7) |
| 2023–2025 | Dundee United | 42 | (3) |
| 2025– | Ross County | 39 | (2) |
- * Club domestic league appearances and goals as of 16:48, 13 November 2026 (UTC)

Ross Docherty (born 23 January 1993) is a Scottish professional footballer who plays as a midfielder for Ross County.

He has previously played for Livingston, Airdrieonians, Ayr United, Partick Thistle and Dundee United.

== Career ==
Docherty was a youth player at Hillwood Swifts Boys Club, before joining Livingston at youth level in 2010. A member of the Under-19 team, Docherty made his first-team debut from the start on 7 May 2011, in Livingston's 3–1 win against Alloa Athletic in the Scottish Second Division. His next appearance was in the following season on 23 July 2011, as a substitute in Livingston's 5–0 win against Airdrie United in the Challenge Cup. He was released in May 2014.

On 22 November 2014, Docherty played as a trialist for Airdrieonians in a 1–0 defeat against Stranraer. He then signed for the club permanently in December 2014.

=== Ayr United ===
Docherty left The Diamonds in June 2015, signing for Scottish League One rivals Ayr United. He scored his first goal for the club on 11 May 2016, in a 1–1 draw against Stranraer in the first leg of the Scottish Championship play off final; the ball dropped at the edge of the box and he rifled it into the bottom corner earning Ayr a draw in the 94th minute. Ahead of the 2017–18 season, Docherty signed a new contract with Ayr and was named club captain.

=== Partick Thistle ===
In December 2019 it was announced in the press that Docherty had signed a pre-contract agreement to join former Ayr United manager Ian McCall at Partick Thistle for the start of the 2020/21 season, signing a two-year deal. In June 2020, following Thistle's relegation to Scottish League One, after the season was called early due to the Coronavirus pandemic, Docherty was officially announced as a Partick Thistle player. Docherty scored his first goal for Thistle scoring the second in a 2–0 away win in League One over Forfar Athletic. After winning League One with Thistle, Docherty signed a new contract adding an extra year to his deal, extending it until 2023. Docherty scored his first goal of the 2021–22 season for Thistle, scoring a header from a corner in a 3–0 away win against Dunfermline.

During his third season with Thistle, Docherty was part of the squad that made it to the Scottish Premiership promotion play off final, which Thistle eventually lost on penalties to Ross County, meaning the club remained in the Scottish Championship. Following this Docherty left the club.

=== Dundee United ===
On 19 June 2023, Ross Docherty signed for Dundee United on a two-year deal.

=== Ross County ===
Following two years with Dundee United, Docherty joined Scottish Championship club Ross County in June 2025, on a two year deal.

== Career statistics ==
As of match played 1 November 2025

Appearances and goals by club, season and competition
| Club | Season | League | | | Scottish Cup | | League Cup | | Other | | Total | |
| Club | Season | Division | Apps | Goals | Apps | Goals | Apps | Goals | Apps | Goals | Apps | Goals |
|---|---|---|---|---|---|---|---|---|---|---|---|---|
| Livingston | 2010–11 | Scottish Second Division | 1 | 0 | 0 | 0 | 0 | 0 | 0 | 0 | 1 | 0 |
| Livingston | 2011–12 | Scottish First Division | 11 | 0 | 0 | 0 | 0 | 0 | 2 (Note: Appearance(s) in Scottish Challenge Cup) | 0 | 13 | 0 |
| Livingston | 2012–13 | Scottish First Division | 10 | 0 | 0 | 0 | 3 | 0 | 0 | 0 | 13 | 0 |
| Livingston | 2013–14 | Scottish Championship | 8 | 0 | 0 | 0 | 2 | 0 | 1 | 0 | 11 | 0 |
| Livingston | Total | | 30 | 0 | 0 | 0 | 5 | 0 | 3 | 0 | 38 | 0 |
| Airdrieonians | 2014–15 | Scottish League One | 21 | 0 | — | | — | | — | | 21 | 0 |
| Ayr United | 2015–16 | Scottish League One | 26 | 0 | 1 | 0 | 2 | 0 | 6 (Note: Two appearances in Scottish Challenge Cup; Four appearances, one goal in Scottish Championship play-offs) | 1 | 35 | 1 |
| Ayr United | 2016–17 | Scottish Championship | 29 | 2 | 6 | 0 | 4 | 0 | 3 | 0 | 42 | 2 |
| Ayr United | 2017–18 | Scottish League One | 16 | 0 | 1 | 0 | 5 | 1 | 1 | 0 | 23 | 1 |
| Ayr United | 2018–19 | Scottish Championship | 19 | 0 | 2 | 1 | 0 | 0 | 2 (Note: One appearance in Scottish Challenge Cup; One appearance in Scottish Premiership play-offs) | 0 | 23 | 1 |
| Ayr United | 2019–20 | Scottish Championship | 22 | 2 | 1 | 0 | 2 | 0 | 1 | 0 | 26 | 2 |
| Ayr United | Total | | 112 | 4 | 11 | 1 | 13 | 1 | 13 | 1 | 149 | 8 |
| Partick Thistle | 2020–21 | Scottish League One | 19 | 1 | 1 | 0 | 3 | 0 | 0 | 0 | 23 | 1 |
| Partick Thistle | 2021–22 | Scottish Championship | 34 | 6 | 3 | 1 | 4 | 0 | 4 (Note: Two appearances in Scottish Challenge Cup; Two appearances in Scottish Premiership play-offs) | 0 | 45 | 7 |
| Partick Thistle | 2022–23 | Scottish Championship | 26 | 1 | 2 | 0 | 6 | 0 | 6 (Note: Appearance(s) in Scottish Premiership play-offs) | 0 | 40 | 1 |
| Partick Thistle | Total | | 79 | 8 | 6 | 1 | 13 | 0 | 10 | 0 | 108 | 9 |
| Dundee United | 2023–24 | Scottish Championship | 20 | 3 | 1 | 0 | 4 | 0 | 1 | 0 | 26 | 3 |
| Dundee United | 2024–25 | Scottish Premiership | 22 | 0 | 0 | 0 | 2 | 0 | — | | 24 | 0 |
| Dundee United | Total | | 42 | 3 | 1 | 0 | 6 | 0 | 1 | 0 | 50 | 3 |
| Ross County | 2025–26 | Scottish Championship | 9 | 0 | 0 | 0 | 4 | 0 | 0 | 0 | 13 | 0 |
| Career total | | | 293 | 15 | 18 | 2 | 41 | 1 | 27 | 1 | 379 | 19 |

== Honours ==
=== Club ===
Ayr United

- Scottish League One: 2017–18

Partick Thistle

- Scottish League One: 2020–21

Dundee United

- Scottish Championship: 2023–24
