= David McKay (footballer, born 1998) =

Scottish footballer (born 1998)

Personal information
- Full name: David McKay
- Date of birth: 17 June 1998 (age 28)
- Place of birth: Livingston, Scotland
- Position: Defender

Team information
- Current team: Alloa Athletic
- Number: 15

Youth career
- 2015–2016: Hibernian
- 2016–2017: Raith Rovers

Senior career*
Years	Team	Apps	(Gls)
2017–2022	Raith Rovers	54	(1)
2021–2022	Edinburgh (loan)	9	(0)
2022–2023	Queen of the South	23	(0)
2023-	Alloa Athletic	58	(2)
- * Club domestic league appearances and goals as of 4 May 2026

David McKay (born 17 June 1998) is a Scottish professional footballer who plays as a defender for Alloa Athletic. McKay has previously played for Raith Rovers and Queen of the South, including a loan spell with Edinburgh.

== Club career ==
=== Youth career ===
McKay started his career in the Hibernian youth ranks before transferring to Raith Rovers.

=== Senior career ===
in 2019, McKay signed a contract extension at Stark's Park until the end of the 2019-20 season.

McKay was part of the Raith Rovers squad that won the 2021-22 Scottish Challenge Cup versus Queen of the South, appearing as an 83rd minute substitute for Liam Dick.

After a loan spell with Edinburgh during the 2021-22 season, McKay signed permanently for the Palmerston club in Dumfries during the 2022 close season.

McKay was released by the Doonhamers at the end of the 2022-23 season.

On 20 June 2023, McKay signed a one-year contract with Alloa Athletic.

== Honours ==
=== Club ===
Raith Rovers

- Scottish Challenge Cup : 2021-22

== Career statistics ==
As of 7 July 2023

Appearances and goals by club, season and competition
Club	Season	League			Scottish Cup		League Cup		Other		Total	
Club	Season	Division	Apps	Goals	Apps	Goals	Apps	Goals	Apps	Goals	Apps	Goals
Montrose (loan)	2016-17	Scottish League Two	1	0	1	0	0	0	0	0	2	0
Raith Rovers	2017-18	Scottish League One	17	0	1	0	2	0	2	0	22	0
Raith Rovers	2018-19	Scottish League One	15	1	0	0	4	0	6	1	25	2
Raith Rovers	2019-20	Scottish League One	14	0	2	0	2	0	4	1	22	1
Raith Rovers	2021-22	Scottish Championship	8	0	0	0	3	0	1	0	12	0
Raith Rovers	Total		54	1	3	0	11	0	13	2	81	3
Edinburgh (loan)	2021-22	Scottish League Two	9	0	2	0	0	0	0	0	11	0
Queen of the South	2022-23	Scottish League One	23	0	0	0	5	0	4	1	32	1
Alloa Athletic	2023-24	Scottish League One	0	0	0	0	0	0	0	0	0	0
Career total			87	1	6	0	16	0	17	3	126	4
