= Shea Gordon (footballer) =

Northern Irish footballer

Personal information
- Full name: Shea Martin Gordon
- Date of birth: 16 May 1998 (age 28)
- Place of birth: Derryloughan, Northern Ireland
- Height: 5 ft 10 in (1.79 m)
- Position: Midfielder

Team information
- Current team: Dungannon Swifts
- Number: 16

Youth career
- –2014: Dungannon Swifts
- 2014–2016: Sheffield United

Senior career*
Years	Team	Apps	(Gls)
2016–2017	Sheffield United	0	(0)
2016	→ Stalybridge Celtic (loan)	2	(0)
2017–2019	Motherwell	4	(0)
2018–2019	→ Partick Thistle (loan)	9	(2)
2019–2022	Partick Thistle	45	(7)
2022	→ Queen of the South (loan)	12	(1)
2022–2024	Larne	41	(1)
2024–2026	Cliftonville	34	(3)
2026–	Dungannon Swifts	10	(0)

International career
2014–2015	Northern Ireland U17	6	(0)
2015–2016	Northern Ireland U19	8	(0)
2017–	Northern Ireland U21	8	(0)
- * Club domestic league appearances and goals as of 29 April 2026

Shea Martin Gordon (born 16 May 1998) is a Northern Irish footballer who plays as a midfielder for NIFL Premiership side Cliftonville. He has previously played for Sheffield United, Motherwell, Stalybridge Celtic, Partick Thistle and Queen of the South.

== Career ==
=== Sheffield United ===
Gordon began his career with Sheffield United, signing his first professional contract in May 2016.

On 21 September 2016, Gordon joined Stalybridge Celtic on a one-month loan.

=== Motherwell ===
On 31 January 2017, Gordon signed for Motherwell, joining up with their U20s team. He went on to make his debut for Motherwell on 5 April 2017, in a 0–0 home draw against rivals Hamilton Academical.

==== Partick Thistle (loan) ====
In early July 2018, Gordon joined Partick Thistle on a season-long loan. He scored two goals within the first six minutes of his Thistle debut in a 2–0 win over Stenhousemuir in the Scottish League Cup. Gordon suffered an injury in a League Cup match against Celtic in August which kept him out for most of the season. He made his return for Thistle after being out injured for 8 months in a 3–0 win over Greenock Morton in March. Gordon scored his first league goal for the Jags in a 1–0 win away to Ayr United on 23 April.

=== Partick Thistle ===
On 15 May 2019, Gordon joined Partick Thistle on a permanent basis, with the move to be completed in July, signing a two-year contract. After staying with the club following their relegation to League One, Gordon scored his first goal of the season, opening the scoring in a 2–0 away win in the league against Forfar Athletic.

After winning the League One title with Thistle, Gordon signed a one-year extension with Thistle.

Gordon scored his first goal of the 2021–22 season, scoring the fourth goal in a 4–0 away win over Ayr United.

=== Queen of the South (loan) ===
On 13 January 2022, Gordon signed for fellow Scottish Championship club Queen of the South on loan until the end of the 2021–22 season.

=== Larne ===
In June 2022 Gordon returned to Northern Ireland, signing for NIFL Premiership side Larne.

=== Cliftonville ===
On 15 January 2024, Gordon signed for Cliftonville of the NIFL Premiership.

== Career statistics ==
As of 1 May 2022

Appearances and goals by club, season and competition
Club	Season	League			National Cup		League Cup		Other		Total	
Club	Season	Division	Apps	Goals	Apps	Goals	Apps	Goals	Apps	Goals	Apps	Goals
Sheffield United	2016–17	League One	0	0	0	0	0	0	0	0	0	0
Stalybridge Celtic (loan)	2016–17	National League North	2	0	0	0	—		0	0	2	0
Motherwell	2016–17	Scottish Premiership	4	0	0	0	0	0	—		4	0
Motherwell	2017–18	Scottish Premiership	0	0	0	0	0	0	1 (Note: Appearance for Motherwell under-20s in the Scottish Challenge Cup in which age-restricted sides from the Scottish Premiership clubs compete against senior clubs)	0	1	0
Motherwell	2018–19	Scottish Premiership	0	0	0	0	0	0	—		0	0
Motherwell	Total		4	0	0	0	0	0	1	0	5	0
Partick Thistle (loan)	2018–19	Scottish Championship	9	2	0	0	5	2	0	0	14	4
Partick Thistle	2019–20	Scottish Championship	16	4	0	0	6	3	1 (Note: Appearance in the Scottish Challenge Cup)	0	23	7
Partick Thistle	2020-21	Scottish League One	21	2	2	1	4	0	0	0	27	3
Partick Thistle	2021-22	Scottish Championship	8	1	1	0	1	0	2	0	12	1
Partick Thistle	Total		45	7	3	1	11	3	3	0	62	11
Queen of the South (loan)	2021-22	Scottish Championship	12	1	0	0	0	0	0	0	12	1
Career total			72	10	3	1	16	5	4	0	95	16

== Honours ==
Partick Thistle

- Scottish League One: 2020–21

Larne

- County Antrim Shield: 2022-23
- NIFL Premiership: 2022-23

Cliftonville

- Irish Cup: 2023-24
