= Steven Bell (footballer) =

Scottish footballer (born 1985)

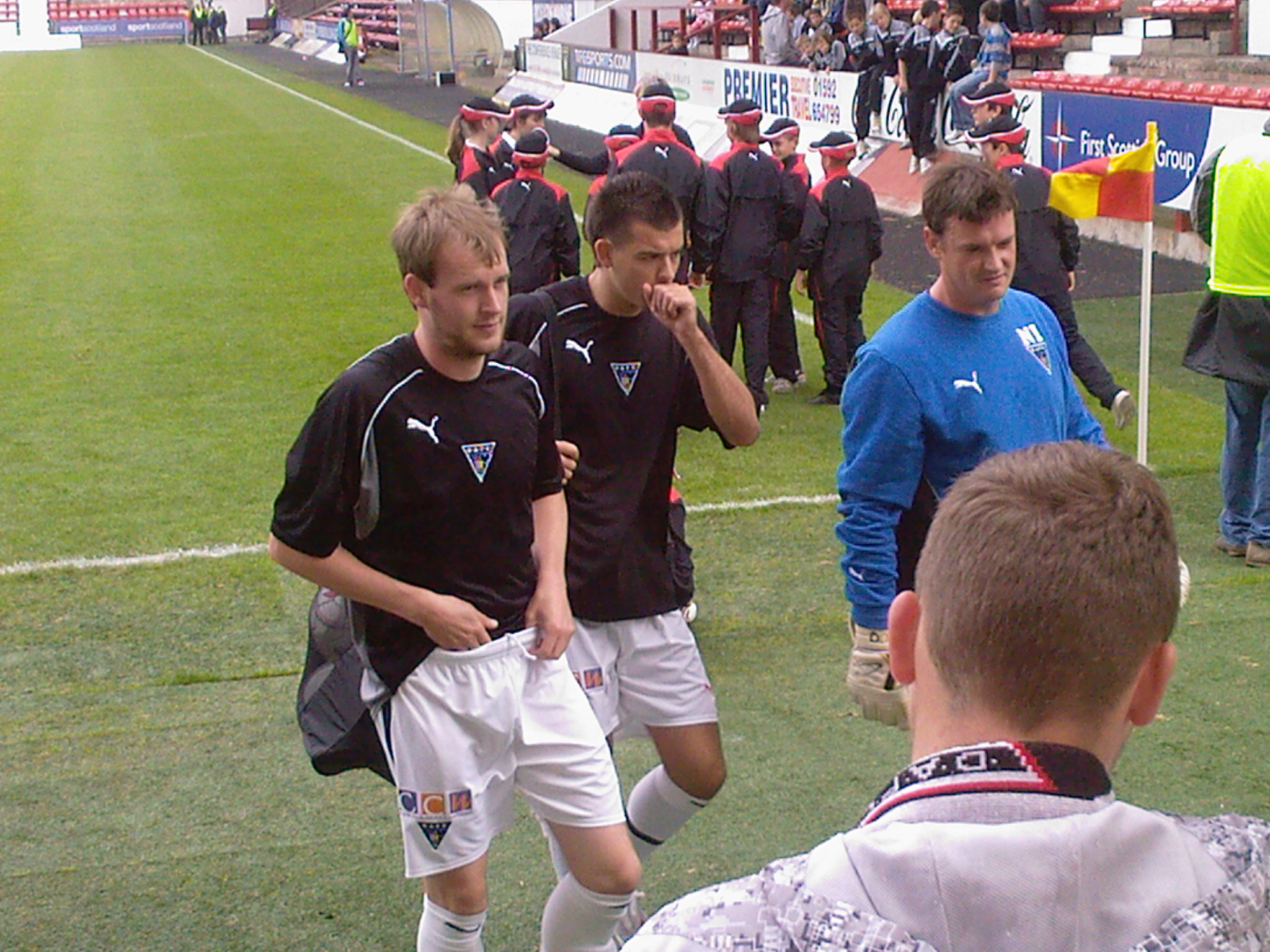
- Bell (centre) whilst playing with Dunfermline Athletic

Personal information
- Date of birth: 24 February 1985 (age 41)
- Place of birth: Scotland
- Positions: Defender; midfielder

Team information
- Current team: Annan Athletic (assistant manager)

Youth career
- Clyde
- 2001–2002: Dundee United

Senior career*
Years	Team	Apps	(Gls)
2002–2005	Dundee United	0	(0)
2005	Queen of the South	2	(0)
2005–2008	Stirling Albion	85	(16)
2008–2012	Dunfermline Athletic	64	(14)
2013–2018	Stranraer	126	(8)
2018–2020	Ayr United	57	(2)
2020–2021	East Kilbride		
2021	→ Partick Thistle (loan)	10	(0)
2021–2022	Partick Thistle	7	(0)
2022	Kelty Hearts	4	(0)
Total		355	(40)
- * Club domestic league appearances and goals

Steven Bell (born 24 February 1985) is a Scottish former professional footballer. Bell started his career with Dundee United, before moving on to play for Queen of the South, Stirling Albion, Dunfermline Athletic, Stranraer, Ayr United, Partick Thistle and Kelty Hearts. As of 30/05/2024, Steven is the assistant manager of Annan Athletic.

== Career ==
=== Early career ===
Bell started his professional career with Dundee United, signing professional forms in 2002. Although Bell featured in matchday squads, he failed to make a first-team appearance during his time at Tannadice, making his first-team debut in a July 2004 friendly at Bolton Wanderers and joined Queen of the South in January 2005. He was injured for much of the 2004–05 season, and before the start of the 2005–06 season he signed for Stirling Albion.

=== Dunfermline Athletic ===
On 30 January 2008, Bell signed a pre-contract agreement with Dunfermline Athletic. Bell's move to Dunfermline was expected to be finalised in May 2008 after his contract with Stirling finished. He signed for the Fife side on 19 May 2008. Bell's 88th-minute substitute appearance at Tannadice in October 2008 during Dunfermline's League Cup defeat was his first senior appearance at the ground he spent three years at professionally.

=== Stranraer ===
On 31 October 2013, after nearly three years out of football due to injury, Bell signed for Stranraer on a contract until January 2014, having played three matches for the club as a trialist. In January 2014, he signed a new deal until the end of the 2013–14 season. After Frank McKeown left Stair Park for Morton, Bell was appointed Stranraer club captain for the 2015–16 season. After over four years with the side, Bell left Stranraer after the club announced it was suffering from financial difficulties.

=== Ayr United ===
On 5 January 2018, he signed for fellow Scottish League One club Ayr United until the end of the 2018–19 season. Bell left Ayr in October 2020, saying that he felt unable to combine his work outside football with training full-time.

=== East Kilbride ===
Bell signed for Lowland League club East Kilbride on 7 October 2020.

=== Partick Thistle ===
In March 2021, Bell joined Scottish League One club Partick Thistle on loan until the end of the season. He made ten league appearances as Thistle won the 2020–21 League One title.

After spending the second half of the 2020–21 season with Thistle and winning the Scottish League One title, Bell joined the club on a permanent basis in June 2021, signing a one-year deal with the Jags.

=== Kelty Hearts ===
Bell signed for League One club Kelty Hearts in August 2022.

On 24 September 2022, Bell announced his retirement from football

== Career statistics ==
As of 18 May 2019

Appearances and goals by club, season and competition
Club	Season	League			Scottish Cup		League Cup		Other		Total	
Club	Season	Division	Apps	Goals	Apps	Goals	Apps	Goals	Apps	Goals	Apps	Goals
Queen of the South	2004–05	Scottish First Division	2	0	0	0	0	0	0	0	2	0
Stirling Albion	2005–06	Scottish Second Division	26	2	2	0	0	0	0	0	28	2
Stirling Albion	2006–07	Scottish Second Division	32	8	3	1	1	0	5 (Note: One appearance in the Scottish Challenge Cup and four in the First Division play-offs)	0	41	9
Stirling Albion	2007–08	Scottish First Division	27	6	1	0	2	0	1 (Note: Appearances in the Scottish Challenge Cup)	0	31	6
Stirling Albion	Total		85	16	6	1	3	0	6	0	100	17
Dunfermline Athletic	2008–09	Scottish First Division	23	3	5	0	3	0	0	0	31	3
Dunfermline Athletic	2009–10	Scottish First Division	31	8	3	0	2	1	2	1	38	10
Dunfermline Athletic	2010–11	Scottish First Division	10	3	0	0	2	0	1	0	13	3
Dunfermline Athletic	2011–12	Scottish Premier League	0	0	0	0	0	0	0	0	0	0
Dunfermline Athletic	Total		64	14	8	0	7	1	3	1	82	16
Stranraer	2013–14	Scottish League One	21	2	4	0	0	0	2 (Note: Appearances in the Championship play-offs)	1	27	3
Stranraer	2014–15	Scottish League One	23	2	3	0	0	0	2 (Note: Appearances in the Championship play-offs)	0	28	2
Stranraer	2015–16	Scottish League One	31	0	2	0	2	0	5 (Note: One appearance in the Scottish Challenge Cup and four in the Championship play-offs)	0	40	0
Stranraer	2016–17	Scottish League One	32	3	2	0	2	0	3	0	39	3
Stranraer	2017–18	Scottish League One	19	1	1	0	2	0	3	0	25	1
Stranraer	Total		126	8	12	0	6	0	15	1	159	9
Ayr United	2017–18	Scottish League One	15	1	0	0	0	0	0	0	15	1
Ayr United	2018–19	Scottish Championship	26	1	2	0	4	1	1	0	33	2
Ayr United	Total		41	2	2	0	4	1	1	0	48	3
Career total			318	40	28	1	20	1	25	2	391	44

== Honours ==
=== Club ===
Ayr United

- Scottish League One: 2017–18

Partick Thistle

- Scottish League One: 2020–21
