= 2018–19 Ross County F.C. season =

Ross County
2018–19 season
- Chairman: Roy MacGregor
- Manager: Steven Ferguson and Stuart Kettlewell
- Ground: Victoria Park
- Scottish Championship: Winners
- Scottish League Cup: Second Round
- Scottish Challenge Cup: Winners
- Scottish Cup: Fifth round
- Top goalscorer: League: Billy McKay (17); All: Billy McKay (20)
- Highest home attendance: League: 6,402 vs Inverness CT; 22 September 2018; Cup: 1,532 vs Dundee United; League Cup; 17 July 2018
- Lowest home attendance: League: 3,065 vs Alloa Athletic; 22 September; Cup: 790 vs Raith Rovers; Challenge Cup; 8 September 2018
- Average home league attendance: 3,849
Home colours	Away colours

The 2018–19 season seen the club's return to the Scottish Championship after being relegated from the Scottish Premiership, the top flight of Scottish football. On 26 April 2019 however, they were crowned Champions and made an immediate return to the Premiership.

Ross County also be competed in the League Cup, the Scottish Cup and the Scottish Challenge Cup. They won the Challenge Cup beating Connah's Quay Nomads in the final.

== Results and fixtures ==
Win Draw Loss Postponed

=== Pre-season ===
30 June 2018 Friendly	Nairn County	0–3	Ross County	Nairn
15:00		Report	Draper 37'; Fontaine 63', 78'	Stadium: Station Park; Referee: Stuart Riddoch

30 June 2018 Friendly	Wick Academy	3–1	Ross County XI	Wick
13:00	David Allan 24', 86'; Craig Gunn 73'		Joel MacBeath 20'	Stadium: Harmsworth Park; Referee: Gordon Seago

4 July 2018 Friendly	Sint-Truidense V.V.	2–0	Ross County	Netherlands
18:00				Stadium: VV DUNO Training ground Attendance: Behind closed doors

6 July 2018 Friendly	FC Utrecht	2–0	Ross County	Netherlands
19:00	V.D. Maarel 53'; V.D. Streek 90' (pen.)			Stadium: Dolderse Sportclub DOSC

10 July 2018 Friendly	Clachnacuddin	0–7	Ross County	Inverness
19:30		Report		Stadium: Grant Street, Inverness

21 July 2018 Friendly	Formartine United	6–1	Ross County XI	Pitmedden
		Report		Stadium: North Lodge Park

=== Scottish Championship ===
4 August 2018 1	Ross County	1–0	Alloa Athletic	Victoria Park
15:00	Fraser 88'; Lindsay (yellow card) 90+5'		Hetherington (yellow card) 24'	Attendance: 3,065; Referee: Mike Roncone

11 August 2018 2	Dunfermline Athletic	1–3	Ross County	East End Park
15:00	Vincent (yellow card) 22'; Longridge 28'; Ashcroft (yellow card) 54'		Mullin 25'; Watson (yellow card) 30' (goal) 68'; Gardyne 42'	Attendance: 4,949; Referee: Craig Thomson

25 August 2018 3	Greenock Morton	2–1	Ross County	Cappielow
15:00	Buchanan (yellow card) 41'; Tidser 60'; McHugh 77'		Gardyne (yellow card) 48'; Cowie 58' (yellow card) 75'; Vigurs (yellow card) 73'	Attendance: 1,994; Referee: Greg Aitken

1 September 2018 4	Ross County	2–0	Falkirk	Victoria Park
15:00	Morris (yellow card) 39'; Lindsay 68'; McManus 90'; Vigurs (yellow card) 90+2'		Muirhead (yellow card) 40'; Kidd (yellow card) 73'; Harrison (yellow card) 89'	Attendance: 3,564; Referee: Nick Walsh

15 September 2018 5	Queen of the South	0–0	Ross County	Palmerston Park
15:00	Jacobs (yellow card) 6'		Vigurs (yellow card) 54'	Attendance: 1,509; Referee: Steven Maclean

22 September 2018 6	Ross County	0–0	Inverness CT	Victoria Park
15:00	Kelly (yellow card) 72'		Donaldson (yellow card) 89'	Attendance: 6,402; Referee: Willie Collum

29 September 2018 7	Dundee United	1–5	Ross County	Tannadice Park
15:00	Safranko 17'; Curran (yellow card) 37'; Murdoch (red card) 59'		McKay 11', 29', 51'; Morris (yellow card) 20'; Watson (yellow card) 34'; Kelly 42'; Mullin 50'	Attendance: 4,446; Referee: John Beaton

6 October 2018 8	Partick Thistle	0–2	Ross County	Firhill Stadium
15:00	Bannigan (yellow card) 8'; Keown (yellow card) 38'; Elliott (yellow card) 55'; Erskine (yellow card) 56'		Mullin 14'; McKay 56'; Draper (yellow card) 90+1' (yellow-red card)	Attendance: 2,784; Referee: Nick Walsh

20 October 2018 9	Ross County	2–1	Ayr United	Victoria Park
15:00	Morris (yellow card) 21'; McKay 23'; Mullin 34'; Watson (yellow card) 70'; Demetriou (yellow card) 83'; Keillor-Dunn (yellow card) 87'		Shankland 50'; Moore (yellow card) 55'	Attendance: 3,140; Referee: Steven McLean

27 October 2018 10	Ross County	5–0	Greenock Morton	Victoria Park
15:00	McKay 9', 42', 48'; Keillor-Dunn 57'; Graham 90+1'		Telfer (yellow card) 45+1'	Attendance: 3,481; Referee: Steven Reid

30 October 2018 11	Falkirk	1–1	Ross County	Falkirk Stadium
19:45	Draper 26' (o.g.); Muirhead (yellow card) 63'; Robson (yellow card) 75'		Graham (yellow card) 66'; Vigurs (yellow card) 72' (goal) 78'	Attendance: 3,767; Referee: Euan Anderson

3 November 2018 12	Inverness CT	2–2	Ross County	Caledonian Stadium
15:00	Oakley 19'; Rooney 30'; Calder (yellow card) 45+1'; Walsh (yellow card) 49'		Lindsay 17'; (yellow card) 90+3'; Mackay 43' (o.g.); Vigurs (yellow card) 67'	Attendance: 4,353; Referee: Kevin Clancy

10 November 2018 13	Ross County	0–1	Dundee United	Victoria Park
15:00	Mullin (yellow card) 36'; Kelly (yellow card) 39'		Watson 15'; McMullan (yellow card) 21'; Fyvie (yellow card) 60'; Murdoch (yellow card) 90+6'; Rabitsch (yellow card) 90+6'	Attendance: 4,565; Referee: Alan Newlands

24 November 2018 14	Ross County	2–1	Dunfermline Athletic	Victoria Park
15:00	McKay 9'; Lindsay 60'	Report	Higginbotham (red card) 15'; Vincent (yellow card) 31'; Longridge 74'; Ashcroft (yellow card) 83'	Attendance: 3,121; Referee: Alan Muir

1 December 2018 15	Alloa Athletic	0–1	Ross County	Recreation Park
15:00	Flannigan (yellow card) 41'; Zanatta (yellow card) 57'		Grivosti (yellow card) 66'; Watson 90+1'	Attendance: 592; Referee: Greg Aitken

8 December 2018 16	Ross County	1–1	Queen of the South	Victoria Park
15:00	Fraser (yellow card) 24'; Mullin 55'	Report	Norman (yellow card) 35'; Stirling 71'	Attendance: 3,305; Referee: Mike Roncone

15 December 2018 17	Ayr United	3–3	Ross County	Somerset Park
15:00	Shankland 21', 25'; Geggan 43' (yellow card) 63'; Bell (yellow card) 47'		Mullin 12'; Demetriou (yellow card) 24'; Mckay 48'; Cowie 52'; Lindsay (yellow card) 61'	Attendance: 2,030; Referee: Bobby Madden

22 December 2018 18	Ross County	2–0	Partick Thistle	Victoria Park
15:00	Mckay 26'; Draper (yellow card) 71'; Stewart 79'		Bannigan (yellow card) 57'; Scobbie (yellow card) 61'	Attendance: 3,467; Referee: Colin Steven

29 December 2018 19	Ross County	2–1	Inverness CT	Victoria Park
15:00	Mckay 26'; Stewart 85'; Graham (red card) 90'		White 44'; Rooney (red card) 90'	Attendance: 6,313; Referee: Andrew Dallas

4 January 2019 20	Greenock Morton	1–0	Ross County	Cappielow
19:45	Tidser (yellow card) 53'; McHugh (yellow card) 54'; Waddell 66'; Iredale (yellow card) 73'; Millar (yellow card) 90'		Fraser (red card) 90'; Gardyne (yellow card) 90+1'	Attendance: 1,537; Referee: Willie Collum

12 January 2019 21	Queen of the South	4–0	Ross County	Palmerston Park
15:00	Dobbie 12', 77'; Doyle 45'; Maguire 45'		Gardyne (yellow card) 38'; Spence (yellow card) 59'; Mullin (red card) 68'	Attendance: 1,386; Referee: Steven Reid

26 January 2019 22	Ross County	2–0	Alloa Athletic	Victoria Park
15:00	McManus 12'; Spence (yellow card) 24'; Lindsay 62'			Attendance: 3,521; Referee: Steven Kirkland

2 February 2019 23	Dunfermline Athletic	1–2	Ross County	East End Park
15:00	Craigen (yellow card) 9'; Devine (yellow card) 24'; Anderson 41'; Smith (yellow card) 79'; Higginbotham (yellow card) 87'		Mckay 52'; Lindsay (yellow card) 68'; Gardyne 77'; Spence (yellow card) 89' van der Weg (yellow card) 89'	Attendance: 4,347; Referee: Barry Cook

23 February 2019 24	Partick Thistle	2–4	Ross County	Firhill Stadium
15:00	Fitzpatrick 21'; Elliott 24'		Stewart 47', 74'; Lindsay 64'; McKay 79'	Attendance: 3,007; Referee: Gavin Duncan

26 February 2019 25	Ross County	3–2	Ayr United	Victoria Park
19:45	McKay 35', 70', 75'		Shankland 62'; Murdoch 73'	Attendance: 3,489; Referee: Nick Walsh

9 March 2019 26	Ross County	2–0	Greenock Morton	Victoria Park
15:00	Mullin 55'; Graham 78'			Attendance: 3,110; Referee: Greg Aitken

12 March 2019 27	Ross County	2–1	Falkirk	Victoria Park
19:45	Graham 12'; Watson 22'; Grivosti (red card) 85'		McShane 87'	Attendance: 3,148; Referee: Steven Kirkland

19 March 2019 28	Dundee United	1–0	Ross County	Tannadice Park
19:45	Butcher 7'; Connolly (yellow card) 29'; Clark (yellow card) 90+1'		Stewart (yellow card) 11'; Lindsay (yellow card) 90+2'	Attendance: 4,290; Referee: Willie Collum

30 March 2019 29	Alloa Athletic	1–0	Ross County	Recreation Park
15:00	Zanatta 33'			Attendance: 697; Referee: Colin Steven

2 April 2019 30	Inverness CT	1–2	Ross County	Caledonian Stadium
19:05	Tremarco 24'; Trafford (red card) 45+1'		Mullin 8'; Boyle 34'	Attendance: 3,795; Referee: Nick Walsh

5 April 2019 31	Ross County	1–1	Dundee United	Victoria Park
19:05	Lindsay 90+4'		Pavol Šafranko 12'	Attendance: 3,550; Referee: Steven McLean

9 April 2018 32	Ross County	1–0	Dunfermline Athletic	Victoria Park
19:45	Grivosti 60'			Attendance: 3,222; Referee: Don Robertson

13 April 2019 33	Ross County	0–0	Partick Thistle	Victoria Park
15:00	Kelly (yellow card) 82'		Gordon (yellow card) 72'	Attendance: 4,031; Referee: Gavin Duncan

19 April 2019 34	Ayr United	1–3	Ross County	Somerset Park
19:05	Miller 12'; Harvie (yellow card) 57'		Graham 42', 46', 71' (yellow card) 73'; Gardyne (yellow card) 84'	Attendance: 1,692; Referee: Euan Anderson

26 April 2018 35	Ross County	4–0	Queen of the South	Victoria Park
19:05	Stewart 29'; Graham 51', 81'; Mullin 54'; Gardyne (yellow card) 76'		Wilson (yellow card) 5'; Dykes (yellow card) 85'	Attendance: 4,805; Referee: John Beaton

4 May 2019 36	Falkirk	3–2	Ross County	Falkirk Stadium
15:00	Rudden 27'; McKenna 75'; McGhee 77'		Stewart 29'; Vigurs 73'	Attendance: 4,682; Referee: Steven McLean

=== Scottish League Cup ===
==== Group stage ====
14 July 2018 Group A	Ross County	2–0	Elgin City	Victoria Park
15:00	McManus 61'; Mullin 82'; Morris (yellow card) 88'	Report	Miller (yellow card) 54'; McLeish (yellow card) 73'	Attendance: 1,270; Referee: Alan Newlands

17 July 2018 Group A	Ross County	1–0	Dundee United	Victoria Park
19:45	Draper (yellow card) 32'; Lindsay 85'	Sky Report; United Report	Stanton (yellow card) 22'; Smith (yellow card) 26'	Attendance: 1,532; Referee: Willie Collum

25 July 2018 Group A	Arbroath	4–1	Ross County	Gayfield Park
19:45	McKenna (yellow card) 6' (goal) 43', 59'; Hamilton 72'; Hester 83'	P&J Report	Mckay 23'; Dingwall (yellow card) (yellow-red card) 57'; Vigurs (yellow card) 69'; Draper (yellow card) 81'	Attendance: 496; Referee: Steven Kirkland

28 July 2018 Group A	Alloa Athletic	0–2	Ross County	Recreation Park
15:00	Karadachki (yellow card) 54'; Trouten (yellow card) 54'	Report	McManus (yellow card) 50'; Morris 59'; Dow (yellow card) 81'; Paton 90+2'	Attendance: 431; Referee: Ryan Lee

==== Second round ====
18 August 2018 Second round	Hibernian	3–2	Ross County	Easter Road
15:00 BST	Gray 15'; Mallan 70'; Horgan 90+1'; Whittaker (yellow card) 90+5'	Report	Vigurs (yellow card) 1'; Gardyne 10'; Draper (yellow card) 28'; Morris (yellow card) 45'; Mullin 64'; Cowie (yellow card) 75'	Attendance: 7,452; Referee: Kevin Clancy

=== Scottish Challenge Cup ===
14 August 2018 First round	Heart of Midlothian Colts	1–2	Ross County	Tynecastle Park
19:45	Keena 44' (yellow card) 67'; Cochrane (yellow card) 47'	Report	Mckay 4', 30'; Dow (yellow card) 52'; Dingwall (yellow card) 82'	Attendance: 344; Referee: Gavin Duncan

8 September 2018 Second round	Ross County	5–0	Raith Rovers	Victoria Park
15:00	Graham 18', 29', 40', 42'; Lindsay 37'	Report	Gillespie (yellow card) 80'	Attendance: 790; Referee: John Beaton

13 October 2018 Third round	Ross County	3–1	Montrose	Victoria Park
15:00	Ross Stewart 20'; Davis Keillor-Dunn 41', 51'		Johnston 44'	Attendance: 1,122; Referee: Craig Napier

17 November 2018 Quarter-finals	Motherwell Colts	1–2	Ross County	Fir Park
15:00	Rodriguez (yellow card) 15'; Livingstone 53'; Mbulu (red card) 54'; Watson (yellow card) 90+4'		Demetriou (yellow card) 45'; Stewart 51', 56'; Draper (yellow card) 53'	Attendance: 1,209; Referee: David Munro

15 February 2019 Semi-finals	Ross County	2–1	East Fife	Victoria Park
19:45	Armstrong 18'; McManus 38'		Dowds 39'	Attendance: 1,283; Referee: Alan Newlands

23 March 2019 Final	Ross County	3–1	(Wales) Connah's Quay Nomads	Caledonian Stadium
16:30	Mullin 75', 78'; Lindsay 86'	Report	Bakare 22'	Attendance: 3,057; Referee: Alan Muir

=== Scottish Cup ===
19 January 2019 Fourth round	Motherwell	1–2	Ross County	Fir Park
15:00	Hastie 90+1'	Report	Graham 52', 60'; Draper (yellow card) 68'	Attendance: 3,869; Referee: Steven McLean

11 February 2019 Fifth round	Ross County	2–2	Inverness CT	Victoria Park
19:15	Stewart 55'; Watson (yellow card) 68'; Mullin 90+1'		Doran 13'; Welsh (yellow card) 25'; McKay 65'; Chalmers (yellow card) 77'	Referee: John Beaton

19 February 2019	Inverness CT	2–2 (a.e.t.) (5–4 p)	Ross County	Inverness
19:45	White 56', 81'	Report	Stewart 22'; Gardyne 67'	Stadium: Caledonian Stadium; Attendance: 3,608; Referee: John Beaton
	Penalties
	White (penalty scored); Donaldson (penalty scored); Welsh (penalty scored); Polworth (penalty scored); Austin (penalty scored)		(penalty scored) Gardyne; (penalty scored) Fraser; (penalty missed) McManus; (penalty scored) Graham; (penalty scored) Draper

== Squad statistics ==
=== Appearances ===
As of 4 May 2019

No.	Pos	Nat	Player	Total		Championship		League Cup		Scottish Cup		Challenge Cup	
No.	Pos	Nat	Player	Apps	Goals	Apps	Goals	Apps	Goals	Apps	Goals	Apps	Goals
1	GK	(Scotland) SCO	Scott Fox	45	0	36	0	5	0	3	0	1	0
2	DF	(Scotland) SCO	Marcus Fraser (c)	36	1	26	1	4	0	3	0	3	0
3	DF	(Scotland) SCO	Sean Kelly	27	1	19+1	1	5	0	1	0	1	0
4	DF	(England) ENG	Liam Fontaine	13	0	8+1	0	2	0	0	0	2	0
5	DF	(Republic of Ireland) IRL	Callum Morris	19	1	12	0	4+1	1	0	0	2	0
6	MF	(England) ENG	Ross Draper	35	0	23+1	0	3+1	0	3	0	4	0
7	FW	(Scotland) SCO	Michael Gardyne	35	4	19+6	2	5	1	3	1	1+1	0
8	MF	(Scotland) SCO	Jamie Lindsay	48	9	34+1	6	4+1	1	2+1	0	4+1	2
9	FW	(Northern Ireland) NIR	Billy Mckay	34	20	22+2	17	3+1	1	2+1	0	2+1	2
10	FW	(Scotland) SCO	Declan McManus	45	4	12+20	2	4+1	1	1+2	0	4+1	1
11	MF	(Scotland) SCO	Iain Vigurs	19	2	13+2	2	3	0	0	0	1	0
12	DF	(Republic of Ireland) IRL	Andy Boyle	15	1	9+2	1	0	0	2	0	2	0
14	MF	(Scotland) SCO	Josh Mullin	40	14	29+2	9	3+1	2	1+1	1	2+1	2
15	DF	(Scotland) SCO	Keith Watson	35	3	27	3	4	0	3	0	1	0
16	MF	(Scotland) SCO	Lewis Spence	18	0	11+3	0	0	0	3	0	0+1	0
18	DF	(England) ENG	Callum Semple	4	0	2+2	0	0	0	0	0	0	0
19	FW	(Scotland) SCO	Brian Graham	38	14	12+18	8	0+1	0	2+1	2	4	4
21	GK	(Scotland) SCO	Ross Munro	6	0	0+1	0	0	0	0	0	5	0
24	MF	(Canada) CAN	Harry Paton	7	1	0+4	0	0+1	1	0	0	2	0
26	MF	(Scotland) SCO	Don Cowie	33	2	21+8	2	0+1	0	0	0	3	0
27	FW	(Scotland) SCO	Ross Stewart	32	10	17+6	6	0	0	1+2	1	5+1	3
28	DF	(Netherlands) NED	Kenny van der Weg	17	0	12	0	0	0	3	0	2	0
31	MF	(Scotland) SCO	Daniel Armstrong	8	1	3+3	0	0	0	0	0	1+1	1
41	GK	(England) ENG	Joe Williams	0	0	0	0	0	0	0	0	0	0
43	FW	(Scotland) SCO	James Wallace	3	0	0+1	0	0	0	0+1	0	0+1	0
44	DF	(England) ENG	Tom Grivosti	19	1	12+5	1	0	0	0	0	2	0
46	MF	(Scotland) SCO	Jack Murray	1	0	0	0	0	0	0	0	0+1	0
48	DF	(Scotland) SCO	Tom Kelly	1	0	0	0	0	0	0	0	0+1	0
49	MF	(Scotland) SCO	Mark Gallagher	3	0	0+2	0	0	0	0	0	0+1	0
50	FW	(Scotland) SCO	Joel MacBeath	0	0	0	0	0	0	0	0	0	0
Players who left the club during the season
12	DF	(Cyprus) CYP	Stelios Demetriou	15	0	8+1	0	1+1	0	0	0	4	0
16	MF	(Scotland) SCO	Dylan Dykes	2	0	0	0	1	0	0	0	1	0
17	MF	(England) ENG	Davis Keillor-Dunn	16	3	6+5	1	0+2	0	0	0	3	2
18	FW	(Scotland) SCO	Ryan Dow	7	0	0+2	0	2+2	0	0	0	1	0
20	FW	(Scotland) SCO	Greg Morrison	1	0	0	0	0	0	0	0	0+1	0
22	MF	(Scotland) SCO	Tony Dingwall	8	0	1+1	0	2	0	0	0	3+1	0
23	FW	(Scotland) SCO	Russell Dingwall	1	0	0	0	0	0	0	0	0+1	0
40	MF	(Scotland) SCO	Ross Maciver	1	0	0	0	0	0	0	0	0+1	0

== Team statistics ==
=== League table ===
Pos	Team	Pld	W	D	L	GF	GA	GD	Pts	Promotion, qualification or relegation
1	Ross County (C, P)	36	21	8	7	63	34	+29	71	Promotion to the Premiership
2	Dundee United	36	19	8	9	49	40	+9	65	Qualification for the Premiership play-off semi-final
3	Inverness Caledonian Thistle	36	14	14	8	48	40	+8	56	Qualification for the Premiership play-off quarter-final
4	Ayr United	36	15	9	12	50	38	+12	54	Qualification for the Premiership play-off quarter-final
5	Greenock Morton	36	11	13	12	36	45	−9	46	

Source: SPFL
Rules for classification: 1) Points; 2) Goal difference; 3) Goals scored; 4) Points in head-to-head matches; 5) Goal difference in hth matches; 6). Goals scored in hth matches; 7). Play-off (only for deciding promotion, play-off participation and relegation).
(C) Champions; (P) Promoted

==== League Cup table ====
Pos	Team	Pld	W	PW	PL	L	GF	GA	GD	Pts	Qualification	ROS	ARB	ALO	DUN	ELG
1	Ross County (Q)	4	3	0	0	1	6	4	+2	9	Qualification for the Second round	—	—	—	1–0	2–0
2	Arbroath	4	2	1	0	1	9	6	+3	8		4–1	—	—	—	2–0
3	Alloa Athletic	4	2	1	0	1	8	5	+3	8		0–2	4–2	—	—	—
4	Dundee United	4	1	0	2	1	6	3	+3	5		—	1–1p	1–1p	—	—
5	Elgin City	4	0	0	0	4	0	11	−11	0		—	—	0–3	0–4	—

Rules for classification: 1) goal difference, 2) goals scored, 3) away goals scored, 4) matches won, 5) away matches won, 6) drawing of lots.
(Q) Qualified to the phase indicated

== Transfers ==
=== In ===
Date	Player	From	Fee
15 May 2018	(Scotland) Iain Vigurs	(Scotland) Inverness Caledonian Thistle	Free
28 May 2018	(Scotland) Josh Mullin	(Scotland) Livingston	Free
4 June 2018	(Scotland) Jamie Lindsay	(Scotland) Celtic	Undisclosed
6 June 2018	(Scotland) Declan McManus	(Scotland) Dunfermline Athletic	Free
21 June 2018	(Canada) Harry Paton	(Scotland) Heart of Midlothian	Free
21 June 2018	(Republic of Ireland) Callum Morris	(Scotland) Dunfermline Athletic	Free
21 June 2018	(Scotland) Keith Watson	(Scotland) St. Johnstone	Free
25 June 2018	(Cyprus) Stelios Demetriou	(Scotland) St Mirren	Free
2 August 2018	(Scotland) Brian Graham	(England) Cheltenham Town	Free
10 August 2018	(Scotland) Ross Stewart	(Scotland) St Mirren	undisclosed
13 August 2018	(Scotland) Don Cowie	(Scotland) Heart of Midlothian	Free
10 January 2019	(Scotland) Lewis Spence	(Scotland) Dundee	Free
10 January 2019	(Netherlands) Kenny van der Weg	(Belgium) Roeselare	Free
22 January 2019	(England) Callum Semple	(England) Sheffield United	Free
22 January 2019	(Scotland) Daniel Armstrong	(Scotland) Raith Rovers	Free

=== Out ===
Date	Player	To	Fee
1 June 2018	(England) Craig Curran	(Scotland) Dundee United	Free
12 June 2018	(Scotland) Jason Naismith	(England) Peterborough United	Undisclosed
14 June 2018	(Denmark) Thomas Mikkelsen	(Iceland) Breiðablik	Free
15 June 2018	(France) Christopher Routis	(Switzerland) Servette	Free
16 June 2018	(Scotland) Max Ashmore	(Scotland) Stranraer	Free
25 June 2018	(England) Andrew Davies	(England) Hartlepool	Free
27 June 2018	(Scotland) Blair Malcolm	(Scotland) Cowdenbeath	Free
1 July 2018	(Scotland) Sam Morrison	(Scotland) Buckie Thistle	Free
9 July 2018	(Scotland) Kyle Johnson	(Scotland) Stenhousemuir	Free
10 July 2018	(Netherlands) Alex Schalk	(Switzerland) Servette	Free
17 July 2018	(Scotland) Reghan Tumilty	(Scotland) Greenock Morton	Free
20 July 2018	(England) Mark Foden	(England) Gateshead	Free
3 August 2018	(Chinese Taipei) Tim Chow	(Serbia) Spartak Subotica	Free
10 August 2018	(France) David Ngog	(Hungary) Budapest Honvéd	Free
23 August 2018	(Scotland) Greg Morrison	(Scotland) Elgin City	Loan
31 August 2018	(Republic of Ireland) Aaron McCarey	(Northern Ireland) Warrenpoint Town	Free
11 September 2018	(Canada) Harry Paton	(Scotland) Stenhousemuir	Loan
13 September 2018	(Scotland) Jim O’Brien	(England) Bradford City	Free
14 September 2018	(Scotland) Ryan Dow	(Scotland) Peterhead	Loan
3 January 2019	(Scotland) Ryan Dow	(Scotland) Peterhead	Free
8 January 2019	(Scotland) Russell Dingwall	(Scotland) Stenhousemuir	Loan
10 January 2019	(England) Davis Keillor-Dunn	(Scotland) Falkirk	Loan
11 January 2019	(Scotland) Dylan Dykes	(Scotland) Greenock Morton	Free
11 January 2019	(Scotland) Tony Dingwall	(Scotland) Raith Rovers	Free

== See also ==
- List of Ross County F.C. seasons
