= 2018–19 Motherwell F.C. season =

Motherwell F.C.
2018–19 season
- Chairman: James McMahon
- Manager: Stephen Robinson
- Stadium: Fir Park
- Scottish Premiership: 8th
- Scottish Cup: Fourth round vs Ross County
- League Cup: Quarter-final vs Heart of Midlothian
- Top goalscorer: League: David Turnbull (15); All: David Turnbull (15)
Home colours	Away colours

The 2018–19 season is Motherwell's thirty-fourth consecutive season in the top flight of Scottish football and the sixth in the newly established Scottish Premiership, having been promoted from the Scottish First Division at the end of the 1984–85 season. Motherwell also competed in the League Cup and the Scottish Cup,

== Season review ==
=== Pre-season ===
On 26 June 2018, Maguire signed a new one-year contract with Motherwell, until the end of the 2018–19 season.

=== Transfers ===
On 5 June 2018, Motherwell announced the signing of Mark Gillespie on a two-year contract from Walsall, with the transfer becoming official when the Scottish Transfer window opened on 9 June.

On 7 June 2018, Motherwell announced the signing of Liam Donnelly on an initial two-year contract from Hartlepool United.

On 13 June 2018, Motherwell announced the signing of Danny Johnson on a two-year contract from Gateshead.

Motherwell announced their fourth signing of the summer on 19 June 2018, with Aaron Taylor-Sinclair signing a one-year contract with the club following the expiration of his Plymouth Argyle contract on 30 June 2018. The following day, 20 June, Motherwell announced the signing of Alex Rodriguez on an initial one-year contract, whilst Ross MacLean moved to Greenock Morton on a season-long loan deal.

On 2 July, Shea Gordon joined Partick Thistle on loan for the season.

On 7 July, Jake Hastie joined Alloa Athletic on loan until January 2019. On 10 July, Motherwell announced that Broque Watson had joined the reserve team from Celtic and Neil McLaughlin had joined from Partick Thistle and would be immediately loaned out to Stirling Albion for the season.

On 16 July, Motherwell announced the season-long loan signing of Conor Sammon from Hearts.

On 3 August, Motherwell announced that Cédric Kipré had left the club to join Wigan Athletic for an undisclosed fee.

On 9 August, Tom Aldred returned to Motherwell for a second loan-spell, agreeing a deal until the end of the season. The next day, Christian Mbulu signed a one-year contract with Motherwell after his release from Millwall at the end of the previous season.

On 10 December 2018, Vancouver Whitecaps FC announced that they had signed Rose to a two-year contract, following the acquisition of his MLS rights from Seattle Sounders FC, with Motherwell confirming that Rose would join Vancouver Whitecaps on 1 January 2019.

On 1 January 2019, Barry Maguire joined Queen of the South on loan for the remainder of the season, whilst Jason Krones and Jordan Armstrong left the club after the expiration of their contracts. The following day, 2 January, Ryan Bowman moved permanently to Exeter City for an undisclosed fee.

On 3 January 2019, Ross MacLean ended his loan deal with Greenock Morton to join Falkirk on a permanent basis. 2 days later, 5 January, Ross McCormack joined on loan until the end of the season from Aston Villa after his loan deal with Central Coast Mariners was cut short. On 7 January, Gboly Ariyibi joined Motherwell on loan for the remainder of the season from Nottingham Forest.

On 30 January 2019, David Turnbull signed a new contract until the summer of 2021, whilst Aaron Taylor-Sinclair joined Crewe Alexandra on loan for the rest of the season.

On 31 January, Transfer deadline day, Broque Watson joined East Fife on loan for the remainder of the season, George Newell went on loan to Albion Rovers for the rest of the season, and Gaël Bigirimana left the club in a permanent move to Hibernian.

On 7 March, Barry Maguire signed a new contract, until the summer of 2020, whilst Liam Grimshaw agreed a new deal on 12 March, keeping him at club until the summer of 2020.

On 29 March, Adam Livingstone extended his contract until the summer of 2020.

On 10 April, Jamie Semple extended his contract until the summer of 2021.

On 11 April, Motherwell signed a pre-contract agreement with Inverness Caledonian Thistle defender Declan Gallagher, on a contract that will run until the summer of 2021. 6 days later, 17 April, Motherwell signed another pre-contract agreement with an Inverness Caledonian Thistle player, with Liam Polworth agreeing to a contract that will also run until the summer of 2021.

On 1 May, Rangers announced that they had signed Jake Hastie to a pre-contract agreement, with the winger signing a four-year contract to begin once his Motherwell contract ends. On 15 May, Motherwell confirmed that Shea Gordon would leave the club when his contract expired at the end of the season, and would sign a permanent deal with Partick Thistle where he had been on a season-long loan.

On 21 May, Motherwell announced that they had offered new contracts to Craig Tanner and Chris Cadden, whilst first teamer Christian Mbulu, Aaron Taylor-Sinclair, Elliott Frear, Carl McHugh, Alex Rodriguez, Curtis Main, George Newell and Jake Hastie would be leaving the club at the end of their contracts after turning down new deals or not being offered new terms. At the same time, Motherwell also confirmed that youngsters Shaun Bowers, Akeal Rehman, Shea Gordon, Liam Brown, Kyle MacDonald, Broque Watson and Neil McLaughlin would also be leaving the club.

== Transfers ==
=== In ===
Date	Position	Nationality	Name	From	Fee	Ref
5 June 2018†	GK	(England)	Mark Gillespie	Walsall	Free	
7 June 2018	DF	(Northern Ireland)	Liam Donnelly	Hartlepool United	Undisclosed	
13 June 2018	FW	(England)	Danny Johnson	Gateshead	Undisclosed	
19 June 2018	DF	(Scotland)	Aaron Taylor-Sinclair	Plymouth Argyle	Free	
20 June 2018	MF	(Spain)	Alex Rodriguez	Sepsi Sfântu Gheorghe	Free	
10 July 2018	MF	(Scotland)	Broque Watson	Celtic	Free	
10 July 2018	FW	(Scotland)	Neil McLaughlin	Partick Thistle	Free	
10 August 2018	DF	(England)	Christian Mbulu	Millwall	Free	

† Gillespie's move was announced on the above date, becoming official when the Scottish transfer window opened on 9 June.

=== Loans in ===
Date from	Position	Nationality	Name	From	Date to	Ref.
16 July 2018	FW	(Republic of Ireland)	Conor Sammon	Hearts	31 May 2019	
9 August 2018	DF	(Scotland)	Tom Aldred	Bury	31 May 2019	
5 January 2019	FW	(Scotland)	Ross McCormack	Aston Villa	31 May 2019	
7 January 2019	MF	(United States)	Gboly Ariyibi	Nottingham Forest	31 May 2019	

=== Out ===
Date	Position	Nationality	Name	To	Fee	Ref.
3 August 2018	DF	(Ivory Coast)	Cédric Kipré	Wigan Athletic	Undisclosed	
10 December 2018†	MF	(Australia)	Andy Rose	Vancouver Whitecaps FC	Undisclosed	
2 January 2019	FW	(England)	Ryan Bowman	Exeter City	Undisclosed	
3 January 2019	MF	(Scotland)	Ross MacLean	Falkirk	Undisclosed	
31 January 2019	MF	(Burundi)	Gaël Bigirimana	Hibernian	Undisclosed	

† Rose move was announced on the above date, becoming official when the Scottish transfer window opened on 1 January.

=== Loans out ===
Date from	Position	Nationality	Name	To	Date to	Ref.
20 June 2018	MF	(Scotland)	Ross MacLean	Greenock Morton	3 January 2019	
2 July 2018	MF	(Northern Ireland)	Shea Gordon	Partick Thistle	End of Season	
7 July 2018	MF	(Scotland)	Jake Hastie	Alloa Athletic	January 2019	
10 July 2018	FW	(Scotland)	Neil McLaughlin	Stirling Albion	End of Season	
26 October 2018	FW	(Ghana)	Alfredo Agyeman	East Kilbride	January 2019	
1 January 2019	DF	(Scotland)	Barry Maguire	Queen of the South	End of Season	
30 January 2019	DF	(Scotland)	Aaron Taylor-Sinclair	Crewe Alexandra	End of Season	
31 January 2019	MF	(Scotland)	Broque Watson	East Fife	End of Season	
31 January 2019	FW	(England)	George Newell	Albion Rovers	End of Season	

=== Released ===
Date	Position	Nationality	Name	Joined	Date	Ref.
1 January 2019	DF	(Scotland)	Jason Krones	Albion Rovers	11 January 2019	
1 January 2019	MF	(Scotland)	Jordan Armstrong	Stenhousemuir	18 October 2019	
5 January 2019	FW	(Ghana)	Alfredo Agyeman	Queen's Park		
31 May 2019	DF	(England)	Christian Mbulu	Crewe Alexandra	30 October 2019	
31 May 2019	DF	(Scotland)	Shaun Bowers	BSC Glasgow	23 August 2019	
31 May 2019	DF	(Scotland)	Aaron Taylor-Sinclair	Livingston	6 November 2019	
31 May 2019	MF	(England)	Elliott Frear	Forest Green Rovers	18 October 2019	
31 May 2019	MF	(England)	Akeal Rehman	Nuneaton Borough		
31 May 2019	MF	(Republic of Ireland)	Carl McHugh	ATK	28 May 2019	
31 May 2019	MF	(Northern Ireland)	Shea Gordon	Partick Thistle	15 May 2019†	
31 May 2019	MF	(Scotland)	Liam Brown	Edinburgh City	10 August 2019	
31 May 2019	MF	(Scotland)	Chris Cadden	Columbus Crew	23 July 2019	
31 May 2019	MF	(Scotland)	Kyle MacDonald	Airdrieonians	27 May 2019†	
31 May 2019	MF	(Scotland)	Broque Watson	Annan Athletic	16 August 2019	
31 May 2019	MF	(Spain)	Alex Rodriguez	Oxford United	20 June 2019	
31 May 2019	FW	(England)	Curtis Main	Aberdeen	5 June 2019	
31 May 2019	FW	(England)	George Newell	Southport	10 September 2019	
31 May 2019	FW	(Scotland)	Jake Hastie	Rangers	1 May 2019†	
31 May 2019	FW	(Scotland)	Neil McLaughlin	Edusport Academy	21 June 2019	

† Hastie & Gordon's moves were announced on the above date, with their Motherwell contracts officially ending on 31 May 2019.

=== Trial ===
Date from	Position	Nationality	Name	Last club	Date to	Ref.
	DF	(England)	Christian Mbulu	Millwall	10 August 2018	

== Squad ==
As of match played 18 May 2019

No.	Name	Nationality	Position	Date of birth (age)	Signed from	Signed in	Contract ends	Apps.	Goals
Goalkeepers
1	Trevor Carson	(Northern Ireland)	GK	5 March 1988 (aged 31)	Hartlepool United	2017	2020	63	0
13	Rohan Ferguson	(Scotland)	GK	6 December 1997 (aged 21)	Airdrieonians	2017	2020	1	0
20	Mark Gillespie	(England)	GK	27 March 1992 (aged 27)	Walsall	2018	2020	29	0
31	P. J. Morrison	(Scotland)	GK	1 January 1998 (aged 21)	Academy	2009		0	0
41	Robbie Hemfrey	(Scotland)	GK	21 February 2002 (aged 17)	Academy	2018		0	0
Defenders
2	Richard Tait	(Scotland)	DF	24 March 1989 (aged 30)	Grimsby Town	2016	2020	122	5
3	Aaron Taylor-Sinclair	(Scotland)	DF	8 April 1991 (aged 28)	Plymouth Argyle	2018	2019	9	0
5	Tom Aldred	(Scotland)	DF	11 September 1990 (aged 28)	loan from Bury	2018	2019	62	4
6	Peter Hartley	(England)	DF	3 April 1988 (aged 31)	Blackpool	2018	2020	35	5
18	Charles Dunne	(Republic of Ireland)	DF	13 February 1993 (aged 26)	Oldham Athletic	2017	2020	71	1
21	Christian Mbulu	(England)	DF	6 August 1996 (aged 22)	Millwall	2018	2019	6	0
22	Liam Donnelly	(Northern Ireland)	DF	7 March 1996 (aged 23)	Hartlepool United	2018	2020	11	1
29	Adam Livingstone	(Scotland)	DF	22 February 1998 (aged 21)	Academy		2020	5	0
30	Barry Maguire	(Scotland)	DF	27 April 1998 (aged 21)	Academy	2015	2020	5	0
34	David Devine	(Scotland)	DF	20 June 2001 (aged 17)	Academy	2019		1	0
37	Shaun Bowers	(Scotland)	DF	22 January 1999 (aged 20)	Academy		2019	0	0
43	Jack Brown	(Scotland)	DF	2 July 2002 (aged 16)	Academy			0	0
45	Yusuf Hussain	(Scotland)	DF	26 April 2001 (aged 18)	Falkirk	2018		0	0
Midfielders
4	Carl McHugh	(Republic of Ireland)	MF	5 February 1993 (aged 26)	Plymouth Argyle	2016	2019	104	4
7	Chris Cadden	(Scotland)	MF	19 September 1996 (aged 22)	Academy	2013	2019	139	12
8	Allan Campbell	(Scotland)	MF	4 July 1997 (aged 21)	Academy	2016	2021	83	5
11	Elliott Frear	(England)	MF	11 September 1990 (aged 28)	Forest Green Rovers	2017	2019	74	8
12	Gboly Ariyibi	(United States)	MF	18 January 1995 (aged 24)	loan from Nottingham Forest	2019	2019	18	2
14	Liam Grimshaw	(England)	MF	2 February 1995 (aged 24)	Preston North End	2017	2020	71	0
23	Alex Rodriguez	(Spain)	MF	1 August 1993 (aged 25)	Sepsi Sfântu Gheorghe	2018	2019	24	0
26	Shea Gordon	(Northern Ireland)	MF	16 May 1998 (aged 21)	Stalybridge Celtic	2017		4	0
28	David Turnbull	(Scotland)	MF	10 July 1999 (aged 19)	Academy	2017	2021	34	15
32	Jake Hastie	(Scotland)	MF	18 March 1999 (aged 20)	Academy	2016		18	7
33	Liam Brown	(Scotland)	MF	6 August 1999 (aged 19)	Queen's Park	2017	2019	1	0
40	Kyle MacDonald	(Scotland)	MF	1 January 2000 (aged 19)	Academy		2019	0	0
42	Broque Watson	(Scotland)	MF	5 February 1999 (aged 20)	Celtic	2018	2019	0	0
38	Dean Cornelius	(Scotland)	MF	11 April 2001 (aged 18)	Hibernian	2018	2020	1	0
46	Adam Kettings	(Scotland)	MF	18 March 2002 (aged 17)	Academy			0	0
47	Reece McAlear	(Scotland)	MF	12 February 2002 (aged 17)	Academy			0	0
48	Stuart McKinstry	(Scotland)	MF	18 September 2002 (aged 16)	Academy		2020	0	0
Forwards
9	Curtis Main	(England)	FW	20 June 1992 (aged 26)	Portsmouth	2018	2019	58	13
16	George Newell	(England)	FW	27 December 1997 (aged 21)	Bolton Wanderers	2017	2019	9	0
19	Conor Sammon	(Republic of Ireland)	FW	6 November 1986 (aged 32)	loan from Hearts	2018	2019	21	3
24	Danny Johnson	(England)	FW	28 February 1993 (aged 26)	Gateshead	2018	2020	28	8
27	Craig Tanner	(England)	FW	27 October 1994 (aged 24)	Reading	2017	2019	36	9
35	James Scott	(Scotland)	FW	30 August 2000 (aged 18)	Academy			14	1
39	Jamie Semple	(Scotland)	FW	17 May 2000 (aged 19)	Academy	2018	2021	3	0
44	Ross McCormack	(Scotland)	FW	18 August 1986 (aged 32)	loan from Aston Villa	2019	2019	61	14
49	Cole Starrs	(Scotland)	FW	25 April 2002 (aged 17)	Academy			0	0
50	Neil McLaughlin	(Scotland)	FW	25 April 2002 (aged 17)	Partick Thistle	2018	2019	0	0
Left during the season
5	Cédric Kipré	(Ivory Coast)	DF	9 December 1996 (aged 22)	Leicester City	2017.	2020	52	1
12	Ryan Bowman	(England)	FW	30 November 1991 (aged 27)	Gateshead	2016	2019	86	14
15	Andy Rose	(Australia)	MF	13 February 1990 (aged 29)	Coventry City	2017	2019	57	2
17	Gaël Bigirimana	(Burundi)	MF	22 October 1993 (aged 25)	Coventry City	2017	2019	57	3
25	Ross MacLean	(Scotland)	MF	13 March 1997 (aged 22)	Academy	2014	2019	19	1
34	Jordan Armstrong	(Scotland)	MF	2 April 1999 (aged 20)	Academy		2019	0	0
36	Jason Krones	(Scotland)	DF	25 January 1999 (aged 20)	Academy		2019	0	0
38	Alfredo Agyeman	(Ghana)	FW	1 November 2000 (aged 18)	Academy		2019	0	0

=== Out on loan ===
Note: Flags indicate national team as defined under FIFA eligibility rules; some limited exceptions apply. Players may hold more than one non-FIFA nationality.

No.	Pos.	Nation	Player
3	DF	SCO	Aaron Taylor-Sinclair (on loan at Crewe Alexandra)
16	FW	ENG	George Newell (on loan at Albion Rovers)
26	MF	NIR	Shea Gordon (on loan at Partick Thistle)
30	DF	SCO	Barry Maguire (on loan at Queen of the South)

No.	Pos.	Nation	Player
31	GK	SCO	P. J. Morrison (on loan at Albion Rovers)
42	MF	SCO	Broque Watson (on loan at East Fife)
50	FW	SCO	Neil McLaughlin (on loan at Stirling Albion)

=== Left club during season ===
Note: Flags indicate national team as defined under FIFA eligibility rules; some limited exceptions apply. Players may hold more than one non-FIFA nationality.

No.	Pos.	Nation	Player
5	DF	CIV	Cédric Kipré (to Wigan Athletic)
12	FW	ENG	Ryan Bowman (to Exeter City)
15	MF	AUS	Andy Rose (to Vancouver Whitecaps FC)
17	MF	BDI	Gaël Bigirimana (to Hibernian)

No.	Pos.	Nation	Player
25	MF	SCO	Ross MacLean (to Falkirk)
34	MF	SCO	Jordan Armstrong
36	DF	SCO	Jason Krones
38	FW	GHA	Alfredo Agyeman

== Friendlies ==
30 June 2018 Friendly	Crusaders	0 – 1	Motherwell	Belfast
13:00 BST		Report	Johnson 90+2'	Stadium: Seaview

8 July 2018 Friendly	Darlington	1 – 5	Motherwell	Darlington
15:00 BST	H.Saunders 53'	Report	Kipré 4'; Johnson 7'; Campbell 36'; Bowman 81'; Scott 90'	Stadium: Blackwell Meadows
Note: Match original scheduled for 14:00, but moved back to 15:00 on 26 June.

12 July 2018 Friendly	Dunfermline Athletic	0 – 0	Motherwell	Dunfermline
19:30 BST		Report		Stadium: East End Park

== Competitions ==
=== Premiership ===
==== League table ====
Pos	Team	Pld	W	D	L	GF	GA	GD	Pts	Qualification or relegation (Note: Teams play each other three times (33 matches), before the league is split into two groups (the top six and the bottom six).)
6	Heart of Midlothian	38	15	6	17	42	50	−8	51	
7	St Johnstone	38	15	7	16	38	48	−10	52	
8	Motherwell	38	15	6	17	46	56	−10	51	
9	Livingston	38	11	11	16	42	44	−2	44	
10	Hamilton Academical	38	9	6	23	28	75	−47	33	

Source: Soccerway BBC
Rules for classification: 1) Points; 2) Goal difference; 3) Goals scored; 4) Play-off (only if deciding champion, UEFA competitions qualification and second stage group allocation).

==== Results by round ====
Round	1	2	3	4	5	6	7	8	9	10	11	12	13	14	15	16	17	18	19	20	21	22	23	24	25	26	27	28	29	30	31	32	33	34	35	36	37	38
Ground	A	H	H	A	H	A	A	H	H	A	H	A	H	A	H	A	A	A	H	H	A	H	A	H	A	H	A	A	H	A	H	A	H	A	H	H	A	H
Result	L	L	D	W	L	L	L	D	L	W	W	L	W	L	D	L	W	L	L	L	W	W	W	W	W	W	L	D	W	L	W	L	L	D	W	D	L	W
Position	12	12	11	9	9	10	10	10	10	9	9	9	9	9	9	9	9	9	9	9	9	9	9	9	7	7	8	8	7	7	7	8	8	8	8	8	8	8

Source: See Results
A = Away; H = Home; W = Win; D = Draw; L = Loss

==== Results summary ====
Overall								Home						Away					
Pld	W	D	L	GF	GA	GD	Pts	W	D	L	GF	GA	GD	W	D	L	GF	GA	GD
38	15	6	17	46	56	−10	51	9	4	6	29	20	+9	6	2	11	17	36	−19

Source: See Results

==== Results ====
5 August 2018 1	Hibernian	3 – 0	Motherwell	Edinburgh
15:00 BST (UTC+1)	Mallan 30'; Shaw 45'; Boyle 51' (yellow card) 83'	Report	McHugh (yellow card) 7'; Donnelly (yellow card) 29'	Stadium: Easter Road; Attendance: 17,494; Referee: Bobby Madden

11 August 2018 2	Motherwell	0 – 1	Hamilton Academical	Motherwell
15:00 BST (UTC+1)	Sammon (yellow card) 24'; Hartley (yellow card) 66'	Report	Want (yellow card) 49'; Boyd 67'; MacKinnon (yellow card) 85'; Woods (yellow card) 86'	Stadium: Fir Park; Attendance: 4,807; Referee: Nick Walsh

26 August 2018 3	Motherwell	3 – 3	Rangers	Motherwell
12:15 BST (UTC+1)	Johnson 3'; McHugh 18'; Campbell (yellow card) 37'; Hartley (yellow card) 49' (goal) 90+4'; Aldred (yellow card) 66'	Report	Lafferty 15', 38'; Ejaria 43'; Barišić (yellow card) 55'; Halliday (yellow card) 67'	Stadium: Fir Park; Attendance: 9,545; Referee: Craig Thomson

1 September 2018 4	Dundee	1 – 3	Motherwell	Dundee
15:00 BST (UTC+1)	C.Miller (yellow card) 67'; Källman 71'; Inniss (yellow card) 90+6'	Report	Bigirimana (yellow card) 10' (goal) 68'; Johnson 56'; Campbell 86'	Stadium: Dens Park; Attendance: 5,137; Referee: Gavin Duncan

15 September 2018 5	Motherwell	0 – 1	Heart of Midlothian	Motherwell
15:00 BST (UTC+1)	Bigirimana (yellow card) 80'; Aldred (yellow card) 88'	BBC Report	Naismith 28'; Ikpeazu (yellow card) 40'	Stadium: Fir Park; Attendance: 7,218; Referee: Madden

22 September 2018 6	Aberdeen	1 – 0	Motherwell	Aberdeen
15:00 BST (UTC+1)	Wilson 6'; McKenna (yellow card) 76'; Considine (yellow card) 89'; Ball (yellow card) 90+2'	Report	Aldred (yellow card) 44'; Bigirimana (yellow card) 77'; Frear (yellow card) 86'	Stadium: Pittodrie; Attendance: 14,027; Referee: Nick Walsh

29 September 2018 7	Kilmarnock	3 – 1	Motherwell	Kilmarnock
15:00 BST (UTC+1)	Burke 39'; Stewart 43'; Brophy 59' (pen.); Dicker (yellow card) 74'	Report	Main 16' (penalty missed) 23'; Bigirimana (yellow card) 54'; Grimshaw (yellow card) 83'; Johnson (yellow card) 90+4'	Stadium: Rugby Park; Attendance: 5,090; Referee: Don Robertson

6 October 2018 8	Motherwell	1 – 1	Livingston	Motherwell
15:00 BST (UTC+1)	Bowman 17'; Hartley (yellow card) 63'; McHugh (yellow card) 70' (yellow-red card) 78'; Johnson (yellow card) 89'	Report	Menga (yellow card) 45'; Lamie (yellow card) 54'; Jacobs 64'; Gallagher (yellow card) 83'	Stadium: Fir Park; Attendance: 4,256; Referee: Willie Collum

20 October 2018 9	Motherwell	0 – 1	St Johnstone	Motherwell
15:00 BST (UTC+1)	Bowman (yellow card) 63'; Hartley (yellow card) 85'	Report	Kerr 90+2'	Stadium: Fir Park; Attendance: 3,752; Referee: Bobby Madden

31 October 2018 11	St Mirren	0 – 2	Motherwell	Paisley
19:45 GMT (UTC)	Edwards (yellow card) 57'; Flynn (red card) 75'; Samson (yellow card) 75'	Report	Turnbull 30'; McHugh (yellow card) 43'; Cadden 47'; Bowman (yellow card) 77'; Aldred (yellow card) 88'	Stadium: St Mirren Park; Attendance: 4,001; Referee: Kevin Clancy

3 November 20218 12	Motherwell	1 – 0	Dundee	Motherwell
15:00 GMT (UTC)	Bowman (yellow card) 34'; Tait (yellow card) 60'; Turnbull 69'; Johnson (yellow card) 90+5'	Report	Kerr (yellow card) 28'	Stadium: Fir Park; Attendance: 4,129; Referee: Don Robertson

11 November 2018 13	Rangers	7 – 1	Motherwell	Glasgow
15:00 GMT (UTC)	Arfield 8', 60'; Tavernier 35' (pen.); Morelos 38'; Middleton 59'; Grezda 68', 75'	Report	Main 25'; McHugh (yellow card) 25' (yellow-red card) 34'; Hartley (yellow card) 50'	Stadium: Ibrox Stadium; Attendance: 49,802; Referee: Craig Thomson

24 November 2018 14	Motherwell	3 – 0	Aberdeen	Motherwell
15:00 GMT (UTC)	Johnson 25', 30'; Turnbull 54'; Campbell (yellow card) 84'	Report	Ferguson (yellow card) 87'	Stadium: Fir Park; Attendance: 5,131; Referee: John Beaton

1 December 2018 15	Livingston	2 – 0	Motherwell	Livingston
15:00 GMT (UTC)	Lawless 22'; Hamilton (yellow card) 34'; Halkett 83'	Report	Bigirimana (yellow card) 36'; Tait (yellow card) 64'	Stadium: Almondvale Stadium; Attendance: 1,982; Referee: Euan Anderson

5 December 2018 16	Motherwell	1 – 1	Celtic	Motherwell
	Livingstone (yellow card) 26'; Johnson (yellow card) 35' (goal) 88'; Campbell (yellow card) 38'	Report	Christie 13'; Griffiths (penalty missed) 41'	Stadium: Fir Park; Attendance: 8,433; Referee: Kevin Clancy

8 December 2018 17	Heart of Midlothian	1 – 0	Motherwell	Edinburgh
15:00 GMT (UTC)	Haring 14'	Report	McHugh (yellow card) 84'	Stadium: Tynecastle Park; Attendance: 15,915; Referee: Willie Collum

15 December 2018 18	St Johnstone	1 – 2	Motherwell	Perth
15:00 GMT (UTC)	Kennedy (penalty missed) 26'; Watt (yellow card) 46'; Kerr 83'	Report	Aldred 2'; Johnson 17'; Dunne (yellow card) 26'; Campbell (yellow card) 44'; Main (yellow card) 82'; McHugh (yellow card) 90+5'	Stadium: McDiarmid Park; Attendance: 2,302; Referee: Alan Muir

19 December 2018 10	Celtic	3 – 0	Motherwell	Glasgow
19:45 GMT (UTC)	Ralston 28'; Sinclair 32' (pen.); Johnston 45'	Report	McHugh (yellow card) 70'	Stadium: Celtic Park; Attendance: 54,703; Referee: Bobby Madden

22 December 2018 19	Motherwell	0 – 1	St Mirren	Motherwell
15:00 GMT (UTC)	Grimshaw (yellow card) 12'	Report	Jackson 68'	Stadium: Fir Park; Attendance: 4,540; Referee: Don Robertson

26 December 2018 20	Motherwell	0 – 1	Kilmarnock	Motherwell
15:00 GMT (UTC)	Main (yellow card) 71' (yellow-red card) 71'; Grimshaw (yellow card) 84'; Johnson (yellow card) 61'	Report	Jones 40'; Stewart (yellow card) 45'	Stadium: Fir Park; Attendance: 5,426; Referee: Steven McLean

29 December 2018 21	Hamilton Academical	1 – 2	Motherwell	Hamilton
15:00 GMT (UTC)	Imrie 17'; McGowan (yellow card) 61'	Report	Aldred 21', 77'; Frear (yellow card) 40'; Turnbull (yellow card) 52'; Campbell (yellow card) 90+1'	Stadium: New Douglas Park; Attendance: 3,843; Referee: Nick Walsh

23 January 2019 22	Motherwell	1 – 0	Hibernian	Motherwell
19:45 GMT (UTC)	Turnbull 43'; Rodriguez (yellow card) 49'	Report	Oméonga (yellow card) 42'; Mackie (yellow card) 58'	Stadium: Fir Park; Attendance: 4,090; Referee: Bobby Madden

26 January 2019 23	Dundee	0 – 1	Motherwell	Dundee
15:00 GMT (UTC)	Grimshaw (yellow card) 43'; Turnbull 60' (pen.)	Report		Stadium: Dens Park; Attendance: 4,887; Referee: William Collum

2 February 2019 24	Motherwell	3 – 0	Livingston	Motherwell
15:00 GMT (UTC)	Hastie 6', 21'; Main 12'; Ariyibi (yellow card) 52'	Report		Stadium: Fir Park; Attendance: 3,839; Referee: John Beaton

6 February 2019 25	St Mirren	1 – 2	Motherwell	Paisley
19:45 GMT (UTC)	McGinn (yellow card) 46' (goal) 74'	Report	Hastie 10'; Rodriguez (yellow card) 28'; Main (yellow card) 55'; Campbell 77'	Stadium: St Mirren Park; Attendance: 4,383; Referee: Nick Walsh

17 February 2019 26	Motherwell	2 – 1	Heart of Midlothian	Motherwell
15:00 GMT (UTC)	Hastie 13'; Rodriguez (yellow card) 30'; Aldred (yellow card) 56'; Turnbull 90+3'	Report	Djoum (yellow card) 34'; Naismith 37'; Berra (yellow card) 53'; Garuccio (red card) 90+2'	Stadium: Fir Park; Attendance: 5,091; Referee: Nick Walsh

24 February 2019 27	Celtic	4 – 1	Motherwell	Glasgow
15:00 GMT (UTC)	Édouard (yellow card) 21' (goal) 37', 88'; Sinclair 31'; Boyata (yellow card) 53'; Ajer (yellow card) 55'; Toljan (yellow card) 82'; Burke 90+1'	Report	Ariyibi 51'; Tait (yellow card) 53'; Rodriguez (yellow card) 53'; Campbell (yellow card) 87'; Hastie (yellow card) 90+2'	Stadium: Celtic Park; Attendance: 58,604; Referee: Kevin Clancy

27 February 2019 28	Kilmarnock	Abandoned	Motherwell	Kilmarnock
19:45 GMT (UTC)		Report		Stadium: Rugby Park
Note: Match abandoned at halftime due to thick fog

2 March 2019 28	Kilmarnock	0 – 0	Motherwell	Kilmarnock
15:00 GMT (UTC)	McKenzie (yellow card) 19'; O'Donnell (yellow card) 37'; Waters (yellow card) 82'	Report	Tait (yellow card) 37'; Aldred (yellow card) 83'	Stadium: Rugby Park; Attendance: 6,215; Referee: John Beaton
Note: Match originally played on 27 February 2019, but abandoned at halftime due to thick fog

9 March 2019 29	Motherwell	3 – 0	Hamilton Academical	Motherwell
15:00 GMT (UTC)	Turnbull 3', 11' (pen.); Hastie 37'; Rodriguez (yellow card) 54'; Johnson (yellow card) 90'	Report	Gogić (yellow card) 38'; Keatings (yellow card) 56'; Sowah (yellow card) 61'; Kilgallon (yellow card) 90'	Stadium: Fir Park; Attendance: 5,248; Referee: Andrew Dallas

16 March 2019 30	Hibernian	2 – 0	Motherwell	Edinburgh
15:00 GMT (UTC)	McNulty 19' (pen.); Gray (yellow card) 33', (goal) 39'; Mackie (yellow card) 53'	Report	Aldred (yellow card) 19'; Gorrin (yellow card) 78'	Stadium: Easter Road; Attendance: 17,184; Referee: Kevin Clancy

30 March 2019 31	Motherwell	3 – 0	St Johnstone	Motherwell
15:00 GMT (UTC)	Frear 70'; Turnbull (yellow card) 80'; Aldred (yellow card) 87'; Tait 90+2'	Report	Craig (penalty missed) 14'; Davidson (yellow card) 29'	Stadium: Fir Park; Attendance: 4,083; Referee: Euan Anderson

3 April 2019 32	Aberdeen	3 – 1	Motherwell	Aberdeen
19:45 BST (UTC+1)	Lowe 4'; Ball (yellow card) 54'; McGinn 71', 90+7'	Report	Hastie 36'; McHugh (yellow card) 43'	Stadium: Pittodrie; Attendance: 13,228; Referee: Gavin Duncan

7 April 2019 33	Motherwell	0 – 3	Rangers	Motherwell
12:30 BST (UTC+1)	Main (yellow card) 44'; Grimshaw (yellow card) 45'	Report	Arfield 22', 39', 60'	Stadium: Fir Park; Attendance: 9,200; Referee: Nick Walsh

20 April 2019 34	Hamilton Academical	1 – 1	Motherwell	Hamilton
15:00 BST (UTC+1)	MacKinnon (yellow card) 56'; Martin (yellow card) 71'; McGowan (yellow card) 80'; Ogkmpoe 84'	Report	Turnbull 30'; Campbell (yellow card) 82'	Stadium: New Douglas Park; Attendance: 2,746; Referee: Don Robertson

27 April 2019 35	Motherwell	4 – 3	Dundee	Motherwell
15:00 BST (UTC+1)	Turnbull 12', 90+5' (yellow card) 86'; Scott 24'; Rodriguez (yellow card) 28' (yellow-red card) 58'; Ariyibi 50'; McHugh (yellow card) 80'	Report	Woods 11' (pen.); Robson 22'; Ralph (yellow card) 41' (goal) 52'; Kusunga (yellow card) 87'; Horsfield (yellow card) 90'	Stadium: Fir Park; Attendance: 3,662; Referee: Kevin Clancy

4 May 2019 36	Motherwell	1 – 1	St Mirren	Motherwell
15:00 BST (UTC+1)	Turnbull 74'; Tait (yellow card) 88'	Report	McGinn (yellow card) 69'; McGinn (yellow card) 81'; MacKenzie (yellow card) 88'; Magennis 90+4'	Stadium: Fir Park; Attendance: 5,274; Referee: Alan Muir

11 May 2019 37	St Johnstone	2 – 0	Motherwell	Perth
15:00 BST (UTC+1)	Davidson (yellow card) 29' (goal) 47'; Tanser 34' (pen.); Wotherspoon (yellow card) 90+2'	Report	Ariyibi (yellow card) 21'; Gillespie (yellow card) 34'; Aldred (yellow card) 70'	Stadium: McDiarmid Park; Attendance: 3,051; Referee: Colin Steven

18 May 2019 38	Motherwell	3 – 2	Livingston	Motherwell
12:30 BST (UTC+1)	Donnelly 10'; Turnbull 21', 25' (pen.) (penalty missed) 44'	Report	Hardie (penalty missed) 42'; Tiffoney 80', 81'	Stadium: Fir Park; Attendance: 5,794; Referee: David Munro

=== Scottish Cup ===
19 January 2019 Fourth Round	Motherwell	1 – 2	Ross County	Motherwell
15:00 GMT (UTC)	Hastie 90+1'	Report	Graham 52', 60'; Draper (yellow card) 68'	Stadium: Fir Park; Attendance: 3,869; Referee: Steven McLean

=== League Cup ===
==== Group stage ====
===== Table =====
Pos	Team	Pld	W	PW	PL	L	GF	GA	GD	Pts	Qualification
1	Motherwell (Q)	4	3	0	1	0	11	2	+9	10	Qualification for the Second round
2	Queen of the South (Q)	4	3	0	0	1	12	5	+7	9	Qualification for the Second round
3	Edinburgh City	4	1	1	0	2	5	12	−7	5	
4	Clyde	4	1	0	1	2	5	8	−3	4	
5	Stranraer	4	0	1	0	3	7	13	−6	2	

Rules for classification: 1) goal difference, 2) goals scored, 3) away goals scored, 4) matches won, 5) away matches won, 6) drawing of lots.
(Q) Qualified to the phase indicated

===== Matches =====
17 July 2018 1	Motherwell	5 – 0	Edinburgh City	Motherwell
19:45 BST (UTC+1)	Frear 8', 24', 28'; Tait 18'; Main 44'	Report	Black (yellow card) 69'	Stadium: Fir Park; Attendance: 2,749; Referee: Gavin Duncan

21 July 2018 2	Stranraer	1 – 1 (3 – 2 p)	Motherwell	Stranraer
15:00 BST (UTC+1)	Layne 59'; McManus (yellow card) 90+3'	Report	Hartley 38'; Kipré (yellow card) 64'	Stadium: Stair Park; Attendance: 885; Referee: Euan Anderson
	Penalties
	Layne (penalty missed); Cummins (penalty scored); C.McGowan (penalty scored); K.Turner (penalty missed); Lamont (penalty missed); A.McDonald (penalty scored)		(penalty missed) Main; (penalty scored) Cadden; (penalty missed) Tait; (penalty scored) Bowman; (penalty missed) Frear; (penalty missed) Rose

24 July 2018 3	Motherwell	2 – 0	Queen of the South	Motherwell
19:45 BST (UTC+1)	Sammon 12', 37'	Report	Semple (yellow card) 55'; Dykes (yellow card) 60'	Stadium: Fir Park; Attendance: 3,337; Referee: Don Robertson

28 July 2018 4	Clyde	1 – 3	Motherwell	Cumbernauld
15:00 BST (UTC+1)	Goodwillie 31'; Nicoll (yellow card) 86'	Report	Main 76'; Johnson 79'; Sammon 90+1'	Stadium: Broadwood Stadium; Attendance: 1,620; Referee: John Beaton

==== Knockout phase ====
18 August 2018 Second round	Livingston	0 – 1	Motherwell	Livingston
15:00 BST (UTC+1)		Report	Johnson 23'	Stadium: Tony Macaroni Arena; Attendance: 1,957; Referee: Willie Collum

26 September 2018 Quarterfinal	Heart of Midlothian	4 – 2	Motherwell	Edinburgh
19:45 BST (UTC+1)	Mitchell (yellow card) 28'; MacLean 35'; Haring 64'; Lee 88'; Naismith 90+1'	Report	Main 12' (pen.); McHugh (yellow card) 67'; Bowman 80'	Stadium: Tynecastle Park; Attendance: 14,377; Referee: Willie Collum

=== Challenge Cup ===
14 August 2018 First round	East Stirlingshire	0 – 3	Motherwell U20	Falkirk
19:45 BST (UTC+1)	Rodgers (yellow card) 72'; D.Ure (yellow card) 84'	Report	Turnbull 16'; B.Watson 20'; Hastie 22'; J.Armstrong (yellow card) 78'	Stadium: Falkirk Stadium; Attendance: 150; Referee: Duncan Smith

6 September 2018 Second round	Dundee U21s	1 – 2	Motherwell U20	Dundee
19:00 BST (UTC+1)	Armstrong 43' (o.g.)	Report	MacDonald 25'; Watson 86'	Stadium: Dens Park; Attendance: 208; Referee: Mike Roncone

13 October 2018 Third round	Motherwell U20	2 – 0	Sligo Rovers	Motherwell
15:00 BST (UTC+1)	P.McClean 12' (o.g.); C.Mbulu 71'	Report		Stadium: Fir Park; Attendance: 950; Referee: Richard Hulme

17 November 2018 Quarterfinal	Motherwell U20	1 – 2	Ross County	Motherwell
15:00 GMT (UTC)	Rodriguez (yellow card) 15'; Livingstone 53'; Mbulu (red card) 54'; B.Watson (yellow card) 90+4'	Report	Demetriou (yellow card) 45'; Stewart 51', 56'; Draper (yellow card) 53'	Stadium: Fir Park; Attendance: 1,209; Referee: David Munro

== Squad statistics ==
=== Appearances ===
As of match played 18 May 2019

No.	Pos	Nat	Player	Total		Scottish Premiership		Scottish Cup		League Cup	
No.	Pos	Nat	Player	Apps	Goals	Apps	Goals	Apps	Goals	Apps	Goals
1	GK	(Northern Ireland) NIR	Trevor Carson	17	0	12	0	0	0	5	0
2	DF	(Scotland) SCO	Richard Tait	45	1	37+1	1	1	0	6	0
4	MF	(Republic of Ireland) IRL	Carl McHugh	35	1	20+8	1	1	0	6	0
5	DF	(Scotland) SCO	Tom Aldred	40	3	37	3	1	0	2	0
6	DF	(England) ENG	Peter Hartley	18	2	14	1	1	0	3	1
7	MF	(Scotland) SCO	Chris Cadden	25	1	15+5	1	0	0	5	0
8	MF	(Scotland) SCO	Allan Campbell	40	2	31+4	2	0	0	4+1	0
9	FW	(England) ENG	Curtis Main	37	6	27+4	3	0+1	0	5	3
11	MF	(England) ENG	Elliott Frear	29	4	4+18	1	1	0	4+2	3
12	MF	(United States) USA	Gboly Ariyibi	18	2	17	2	1	0	0	0
13	GK	(Scotland) SCO	Rohan Ferguson	1	0	0+1	0	0	0	0	0
14	MF	(England) ENG	Liam Grimshaw	34	0	30+1	0	0	0	2+1	0
18	DF	(Republic of Ireland) IRL	Charles Dunne	26	0	23	0	1	0	2	0
19	FW	(Republic of Ireland) IRL	Conor Sammon	21	3	6+10	0	0	0	3+2	3
20	GK	(England) ENG	Mark Gillespie	29	0	26+1	0	1	0	1	0
21	DF	(England) ENG	Christian Mbulu	6	0	4+2	0	0	0	0	0
22	DF	(Northern Ireland) NIR	Liam Donnelly	11	1	6+1	1	0	0	3+1	0
23	MF	(Spain) ESP	Alex Rodriguez	24	0	16+4	0	0+1	0	1+2	0
24	FW	(England) ENG	Danny Johnson	28	8	12+10	6	1	0	1+4	2
28	MF	(Scotland) SCO	David Turnbull	30	15	26+3	15	1	0	0	0
29	DF	(Scotland) SCO	Adam Livingstone	3	0	0+3	0	0	0	0	0
32	MF	(Scotland) SCO	Jake Hastie	15	7	12+2	6	0+1	1	0	0
34	DF	(Scotland) SCO	David Devine	1	0	0+1	0	0	0	0	0
35	FW	(Scotland) SCO	James Scott	12	1	6+6	1	0	0	0	0
38	MF	(Scotland) SCO	Dean Cornelius	1	0	0+1	0	0	0	0	0
39	FW	(Scotland) SCO	Jamie Semple	3	0	0+3	0	0	0	0	0
44	FW	(Scotland) SCO	Ross McCormack	4	0	0+3	0	1	0	0	0
Players away from the club on loan:
3	DF	(Scotland) SCO	Aaron Taylor-Sinclair	9	0	5+1	0	0	0	1+2	0
30	DF	(Scotland) SCO	Barry Maguire	2	0	1+1	0	0	0	0	0
Players who left Motherwell during the season:
5	DF	(Ivory Coast) CIV	Cédric Kipré	3	0	0	0	0	0	3	0
12	FW	(England) ENG	Ryan Bowman	20	2	7+9	1	0	0	3+1	1
15	MF	(Australia) AUS	Andy Rose	17	0	10+2	0	0	0	4+1	0
17	MF	(Burundi) BDI	Gaël Bigirimana	21	1	12+7	1	0	0	2	0

=== Goal scorers ===
As of match played 12 May 2019

Ranking	Nation	Position	Number	Name	Scottish Premiership	Scottish Cup	League Cup	Total
1	MF	(Scotland)	28	David Turnbull	15	0	0	15
2	FW	(England)	24	Danny Johnson	6	0	2	8
3	MF	(Scotland)	32	Jake Hastie	6	1	0	7
4	FW	(England)	9	Curtis Main	3	0	3	6
5	MF	(England)	11	Elliott Frear	1	0	3	4
6	DF	(Scotland)	5	Tom Aldred	3	0	0	3
6	FW	(Republic of Ireland)	19	Conor Sammon	0	0	3	3
8	MF	(Scotland)	8	Allan Campbell	2	0	0	2
8	MF	(United States)	12	Gboly Ariyibi	2	0	0	2
8	DF	(England)	6	Peter Hartley	1	0	1	2
8	FW	(England)	12	Ryan Bowman	1	0	1	2
8	DF	(Scotland)	2	Richard Tait	1	0	1	2
12	MF	(Republic of Ireland)	4	Carl McHugh	1	0	0	1
12	MF	(Burundi)	17	Gaël Bigirimana	1	0	0	1
12	MF	(Scotland)	7	Chris Cadden	1	0	0	1
12	FW	(Scotland)	35	James Scott	1	0	0	1
12	DF	(Northern Ireland)	22	Liam Donnelly	1	0	0	1
TOTALS					46	1	14	61

=== Clean sheets ===
As of match played 12 May 2019

Ranking	Nation	Position	Number	Name	Scottish Premiership	Scottish Cup	League Cup	Total
1	GK	(England)	20	Mark Gillespie	7	0	1	8
2	GK	(Northern Ireland)	1	Trevor Carson	2	0	2	4
TOTALS					9	0	3	12

=== Disciplinary record ===
As of match played 18 May 2019

Nation	Position	Number	Name	Premier League		Scottish Cup		League Cup		Total	
Nation	Position	Number	Name	Yellow card	Red card	Yellow card	Red card	Yellow card	Red card	Yellow card	Red card
(Scotland)	DF	2	Richard Tait	5	0	0	0	0	0	5	0
(Republic of Ireland)	MF	4	Carl McHugh	11	2	0	0	1	0	12	2
(Scotland)	DF	5	Tom Aldred	9	0	0	0	0	0	9	0
(England)	DF	6	Peter Hartley	5	0	0	0	0	0	5	0
(Scotland)	MF	8	Allan Campbell	7	0	0	0	0	0	7	0
(England)	FW	9	Curtis Main	5	1	0	0	0	0	5	1
(England)	MF	11	Elliott Frear	2	0	0	0	0	0	2	0
(United States)	MF	12	Gboly Ariyibi	2	0	0	0	0	0	2	0
(England)	MF	14	Liam Grimshaw	4	0	0	0	0	0	4	0
(Republic of Ireland)	DF	18	Charles Dunne	1	0	0	0	0	0	1	0
(Republic of Ireland)	FW	19	Conor Sammon	1	0	0	0	0	0	1	0
(England)	GK	20	Mark Gillespie	1	0	0	0	0	0	1	0
(Northern Ireland)	DF	22	Liam Donnelly	1	0	0	0	0	0	1	0
(Spain)	MF	23	Alex Rodriguez	8	1	0	0	0	0	8	1
(England)	FW	24	Danny Johnson	6	0	0	0	0	0	6	0
(Scotland)	MF	28	David Turnbull	2	0	0	0	0	0	2	0
(Scotland)	DF	29	Adam Livingstone	1	0	0	0	0	0	1	0
(Scotland)	MF	32	Jake Hastie	1	0	0	0	0	0	1	0
Players who left Motherwell during the season:
(Ivory Coast)	DF	5	Cédric Kipré	0	0	0	0	1	0	1	0
(England)	FW	12	Ryan Bowman	3	0	0	0	0	0	3	0
(Burundi)	MF	17	Gaël Bigirimana	5	0	0	0	0	0	5	0
			TOTALS	76	3	0	0	2	0	78	3

== See also ==
- List of Motherwell F.C. seasons
