= David Turnbull (footballer) =

Scottish footballer

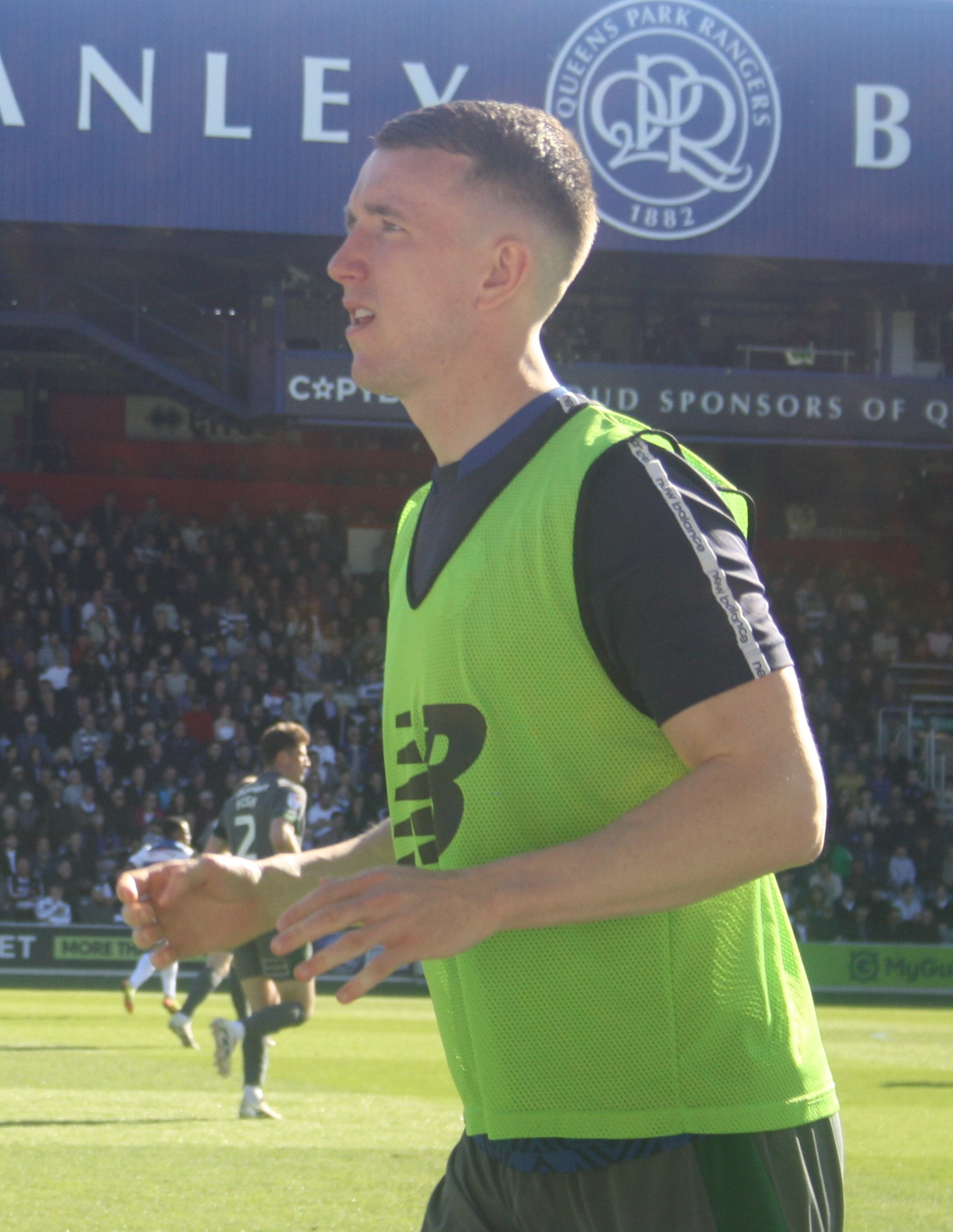
- Turnbull in 2025.

Personal information
- Full name: David Turnbull
- Date of birth: 10 July 1999 (age 27)
- Place of birth: Carluke, Scotland
- Height: 6 ft 1 in (1.85 m)
- Position: Attacking midfielder

Team information
- Current team: Cardiff City
- Number: 14

Youth career
- 2005–2009: Newmains Hammers
- 2009–2017: Motherwell

Senior career*
Years	Team	Apps	(Gls)
2017–2020	Motherwell	39	(16)
2020–2024	Celtic	100	(25)
2024–	Cardiff City	87	(3)

International career^{‡}
2014	Scotland U16	1	(0)
2017–2018	Scotland U19	3	(1)
2018	Scotland U20	1	(0)
2019–2020	Scotland U21	5	(1)
2021–	Scotland	5	(0)
- * Club domestic league appearances and goals as of 8 November 2026 (UTC) ‡ National team caps and goals as of 07:03, 13 November 2021 (UTC)

David Turnbull (born 10 July 1999) is a Scottish professional footballer who plays as an attacking midfielder for EFL Championship club Cardiff City and the Scotland national team. He began his career at Motherwell before moving to Celtic in 2020 where he won the three Scottish domestic competitions twice each; he also won both the major Young Player of the Year awards (SFWA with Motherwell and PFA with Celtic). He joined Cardiff in February 2024.

== Club career ==
=== Motherwell ===
Raised in Wishaw where he attended Coltness High School, Turnbull joined the Motherwell Youth Academy in 2009. He was selected for the Scotland football team (represented by North Lanarkshire school pupils) at the 2014 International Children's Games alongside fellow Motherwell player Jake Hastie, who had already been a teammate for several years during their development. On 27 April 2016, Turnbull, Hastie and another long-term academy colleague Allan Campbell were in the Well team that won the Scottish Youth Cup, beating Heart of Midlothian 5–2.

Turnbull made his senior debut for Motherwell on 10 February 2018, in a 2–0 victory away at Dundee in the Scottish Cup. On 8 May 2018, he made his first start and Scottish Professional Football League debut in a 1–0 victory away to Partick Thistle. Later that month he was an unused substitute in the 2018 Scottish Cup Final which Motherwell lost 2–0 to Celtic.

On 31 October 2018, Turnbull scored his first goal for Motherwell against St Mirren. In January 2019, he was the sole goalscorer in two consecutive league wins in the space of four days, at home to Hibernian and away to Dundee. A few days later he signed a new contract with Motherwell, running until summer 2021. In May 2019, amid more goals and growing media praise for his performances, he was nominated for the season's PFA Scotland Young Player of the Year, along with Jake Hastie; the award was won by Ryan Kent. Turnbull won the SFWA Young Player of the Year award for 2018–19, voted for by Scottish football journalists. He was the first Motherwell player to win that award since James McFadden in 2001–02.

In June 2019, Motherwell agreed a club-record £3.25 million fee with Celtic for Turnbull. The proposed deal collapsed when medical tests found that Turnbull would require preventative surgery on his left knee, and the clubs could not agree revised terms. Turnbull returned to Motherwell, had his knee operation – performed by renowned London surgeon Andy Williams – then underwent a rehabilitation programme across the winter (alongside teammate Charles Dunne who was recovering from a groin injury) and resumed full training in February 2020. His mental and physical recovery was chartered in a behind-the-scenes club documentary which followed him from the day of his collapsed move through operations, rehabilitation and to his eventual return to first-team action. He made his return to the first team as a second half substitute at home to St Mirren on 25 February. On 11 March 2020, Turnbull signed a contract extension with Motherwell to run until 2022. With the 2019–20 season halted days afterwards due to the COVID-19 pandemic in Scotland, he successfully re-established himself as an important member of the side at the outset of 2020–21.

=== Celtic ===
Turnbull joined Celtic on 27 August 2020, on a four-year deal. The fee of around £3 million was a club record for Motherwell.

After three substitute appearances during September, he made his first start for the club on 4 October against St Johnstone. While there was initially few opportunities in the early part of the season, on 10 December 2020 Turnbull started in a UEFA Europa League home fixture against Ligue 1 side Lille OSC. He scored his first goal for Celtic and made an assist for Christopher Jullien in a 3–2 win against the French champion in the last group stage match that season. His subsequent form in the Scottish Premiership saw him named the SPFL Player of the Month for December. Turnbull finished the 2020–21 season with ten goals and won the PFA Scotland Young Player of the Year award, proving to be a positive for Celtic in an otherwise disappointing campaign where they lost the Premiership title and failed to win a trophy.

Under new Celtic manager Ange Postecoglou, Turnbull played regularly in the first half of the 2021–22 season. On 12 August 2021, he scored twice in a 3–0 (agg 7–2) UEFA Europa League play-off win against Czech First League side FK Jablonec. Later that month, he scored a hat-trick in a 6–0 victory against St Mirren in the league. Turnbull featured as a starter in the 2021–22 Scottish League Cup final but was forced off with a hamstring injury after 27 minutes; Celtic defeated Hibernian 2–1 and he collected a winner's medal.

On 3 September 2022, Turnbull scored in a 4–0 win against Rangers, taking advantage of an error from Jon McLaughlin. He was an unused substitute in that season's Scottish League Cup final and came off the bench in the 2023 Scottish Cup final.

=== Cardiff City ===
Having never fully established himself in the Celtic starting lineup and with his contract due to expire in four months, on 1 February 2024 Turnbull signed for EFL Championship club Cardiff City on a permanent deal (the fee was undisclosed but reported at around £2 million) running to 2027.

Turnbull scored his first goal for the Bluebirds in a 3–1 defeat to Blackburn Rovers on 9 November 2024.

On 16 December 2025, he scored the only goal for his club in a 3–1 home defeat to Chelsea in the quarterfinals of the EFL Cup.

== International career ==
Turnbull has played at under-16, under-19 and under-20 level for Scotland. He made his debut for the under-21 team in March 2019. He was added to the full national squad for the first time in May 2021, ahead of the delayed UEFA Euro 2020 tournament. He made his debut on 2 June 2021 in a friendly against Netherlands, as a starter. He was selected in the squad for the Euro finals, but did not make an appearance.

== Career statistics ==
As of 19 September 2026

Appearances and goals by club, season and competition
Club	Season	League			National cup (Note: Includes Scottish Cup, FA Cup)		League cup (Note: Includes Scottish League Cup, EFL Cup)		Other		Total	
Club	Season	Division	Apps	Goals	Apps	Goals	Apps	Goals	Apps	Goals	Apps	Goals
Motherwell	2016–17	Scottish Premiership	0	0	0	0	0	0	—		0	0
Motherwell	2017–18	Scottish Premiership	2	0	1	0	0	0	—		3	0
Motherwell	2018–19	Scottish Premiership	30	15	1	0	0	0	—		31	15
Motherwell	2019–20	Scottish Premiership	2	0	0	0	0	0	—		2	0
Motherwell	2020–21	Scottish Premiership	5	1	0	0	0	0	0	0	5	1
Motherwell	Total		39	16	2	0	0	0	0	0	41	16
Motherwell U20/U21 (Note: Matches in the Scottish Challenge Cup, in which age-restricted teams from the SPFL Premiership clubs compete against senior clubs.)	2016–17		—						2	0	2	0
Motherwell U20/U21	2017–18		—						2	1	2	1
Motherwell U20/U21	2018–19		—						3	1	3	1
Motherwell U20/U21	Total		0	0	0	0	0	0	7	2	7	2
Celtic	2020–21	Scottish Premiership	31	8	3 (Note: One appearance in the previous season's Scottish Cup which was rescheduled to October due to COVID-19)	0	0	0	1 (Note: Appearances in the UEFA Europa League)	1	35	9
Celtic	2021–22	Scottish Premiership	25	6	0	0	4	1	12 (Note: 2 appearances in the UEFA Champions League, 10 appearances in UEFA Europa League)	3 (Note: 3 goals in the UEFA Europa League)	34	10
Celtic	2022–23	Scottish Premiership	28	4	2	1	2	0	5 (Note: Appearances in the UEFA Champions League)	0	37	5
Celtic	2023–24	Scottish Premiership	16	7	0	0	1	0	2	0	19	7
Celtic	Total		100	25	5	1	7	1	20	4	125	31
Cardiff City	2023–24	Championship	17	0	0	0	0	0	—		17	0
Cardiff City	2024–25	Championship	19	1	0	0	0	0	—		19	1
Cardiff City	2025–26	EFL League One	41	2	1	0	4	1	2 (Note: Appearances in EFL Trophy)	0	48	3
Cardiff City	2026–27	Championship	4	0	0	0	2	0	—		6	0
Cardiff City	Total		81	3	1	0	6	1	2	0	90	4
Career total			220	44	8	1	13	2	24	6	265	53

== Honours ==
Motherwell

- Scottish Youth Cup: 2015–16

Celtic

- Scottish Premiership: 2021–22, 2022–23
- Scottish Cup: 2019–20, 2022–23
- Scottish League Cup: 2021–22, 2022–23

Individual

- SFWA Young Player of the Year: 2018–19
- PFAS Young Player of the Year: 2020–21
- PFA Scotland Team of the Year: 2020–21
- MFC Fans' Player of the Year: 2018–19
- Motherwell Players' Player of the Year: 2018–19
- Motherwell Young Player of the Year: 2018–19
- Motherwell Goal of the Season: 2018–19
- Celtic FC Player of the Year: 2020–21
- Celtic FC Young Player of the Year: 2020–21
- Evening Times Celtic Player of the Year: 2020–21
- SPFL Premiership Player of the Month: December 2020
