= Andy Williams (surgeon) =

British knee and sports surgeon (born 1964)

- Williams in 2014
- Born: Andrew Michael Williams; March 14, 1964; England, United Kingdom
- Education: King's College Hospital
- Occupation: Orthopaedic surgeon
- Medical career
- Institutions: Imperial College London; Nuffield Orthopaedic Centre
- Sub-specialties: Ligament injuries
- Awards: The Times' Britain's Top Surgeons 2011; Honorary Reader, Imperial College London 2010; Hunterian Professor, Royal College of Surgeons of England, 2005-2006

Andrew Michael Williams (born 14 March 1964) is a British knee and sports surgeon who specialises in soft tissue knee injuries especially to ligament, menisci and joint surface. He is known for treating professional athletes, including English Premier League footballers. and English Premiership rugby union players. Williams is a Reader at Imperial College London and co-founder of London musculoskeletal health centre Fortius Clinic. He was named in The Times 2011 list of Britain's top surgeons.

== Biography ==
Williams qualified in medicine at King's College Hospital, London in 1987. He completed his orthopaedic training at the Royal National Orthopaedic Hospital in Stanmore in 1996, before undertaking a year-long fellowship in Brisbane, Australia in 1996-97 with Dr Peter Myers.

He then became Senior Lecturer / Honorary Consultant at The Royal National Orthopaedic Hospital, before becoming Consultant at The Chelsea and Westminster Hospital until 2015.

Williams is also a researcher and lecturer on knee-related issues. He is a Reader at Imperial College, London and an Honorary Senior Research Fellow at Nuffield Department of Orthopaedics, University of Oxford.

He has published award winning research - for this he received the British Orthopaedic Association / Royal College of Surgeons of England’s Arnott Prize, Hunterian Professorship, and The Robert Jones Medal. The research has been focused on understanding knee motion in health and disease with implications for knee replacement and knee injury, and soft tissue anatomy and biomechanics to further understanding of ligament and meniscus function, injury, and best treatment. In addition clinical follow up studies of athletes have shown how the lessons learned in the lab have improved patient outcomes.

In 2014 Williams became a member of the ESSKA (European Society for Sports Traumatology, Knee Surgery and Arthroscopy) Sports Committee. He was also a board member at The Bone & Joint Journal for which he remains a reviewer as he is for The American Journal of Sports Medicine. He was a lead editor on the 39th edition of Gray's Anatomy.

He sits on the board of directors of ISAKOS (International Society of Arthroscopy, Knee Surgery, and Orthopaedic Sports Medicine), and will be president of The ACL Study Group in 2030.

== Notable patients ==
Williams has treated a number of Premier League footballers and many at other levels, including Virgil van Dijk, Danny Welbeck, Alex Oxlade-Chamberlain, Andy Carroll, Theo Walcott, John Terry, David Turnbull, Saša Kalajdžić, James Maddison, Ben Chilwell. He treated international cricket players Andrew Flintoff, Ben Stokes and Shoaib Akhtar in 2009, former England rugby union captain Lawrence Dallaglio in 2011, and British Olympic snowboarder Billy Morgan in 2014. He has also treated current UFC Heavyweight Champion Tom Aspinall.
