= George Newell =

English footballer

Personal information
- Full name: George Stephen Newell
- Date of birth: 27 January 1997 (age 29)
- Place of birth: Formby, England
- Height: 1.84 m (6 ft 0 in)
- Position: Forward

Team information
- Current team: Marine
- Number: 9

Youth career
- 2010–2015: Everton

Senior career*
Years	Team	Apps	(Gls)
2015–2017	Bolton Wanderers	2	(0)
2016	→ AFC Fylde (loan)	2	(0)
2017–2019	Motherwell	8	(0)
2019	→ Albion Rovers (loan)	11	(2)
2019–2022	Southport	17	(7)
2019–2020	→ Marine (loan)	6	(5)
2021–2022	→ Marine (loan)	9	(4)
2022–2025	Bala Town	59	(28)
2025–	Marine	36	(8)
- * Club domestic league appearances and goals as of 12:47, 26 April 2026

George Stephen Newell (born 27 January 1997) is an English footballer who plays as a forward for National League North club Marine.

== Early life ==
Newell was born in Formby and has been with Bolton Wanderers since the summer of 2015 after completing a two-year scholarship with Everton.

== Club career ==
Newell initially joined Bolton Wanderers U21 team and made his first team debut on 30 April 2016, coming on as a substitute for Emile Heskey in the home game against Hull City in the Football League Championship. The EFL retained and released list published on 13 June 2017 confirmed that Newell had left the club.

On 24 July 2017, Newell signed a one-year contract with Scottish Premiership side Motherwell. He was released in July 2019.

On 10 September 2019, Newell joined Southport. In November 2019 he joined Marine on loan until 6 January 2020. He returned to his parent club in early January.

In February 2021, after a horrific double compound leg fracture, Southport set up a GoFundMe to help fund his medical bills. He joined Marine on loan again in December 2021 and the loan was extended in January 2022. He was recalled to Southport in February.

In July 2022 he signed for Bala Town.

In June 2025 he signed permanently for Marine.

== Personal life ==
Newell is the son of former Blackburn Rovers and Everton forward Mike Newell.

== Career statistics ==
=== Club ===
As of match played 18 July 2018

Appearances and goals by club, season and competition
Club	Season	League			National Cup		League Cup		Continental		Other		Total	
Club	Season	Division	Apps	Goals	Apps	Goals	Apps	Goals	Apps	Goals	Apps	Goals	Apps	Goals
Bolton Wanderers	2015–16	Championship	2	0	0	0	0	0	–		–		2	0
Bolton Wanderers	2016–17	League One	0	0	0	0	0	0	–		–		0	0
Bolton Wanderers	Total		2	0	0	0	0	0	0	0	0	0	2	0
AFC Fylde (loan)	2016–17	National League North	2	0	0	0	0	0	–		–		2	0
Motherwell	2017–18	Scottish Premiership	8	0	1	0	1	0	–		1	1	11	1
Motherwell	2018–19	Scottish Premiership	0	0	0	0	0	0	–		–		0	0
Motherwell	Total		8	0	1	0	1	0	0	0	1	1	11	1
Career total			12	0	1	0	1	0	0	0	1	1	15	1
