= 2018–19 Scottish Challenge Cup =

Tournament details
- Country: Scotland
- Teams: 58

Final positions
- Champions: Ross County
- Runners-up: Connah's Quay Nomads

Tournament statistics
- Matches played: 56
- Goals scored: 172 (3.07 per match)
- Attendance: 37,300 (666 per match)
- Top goal scorer(s): Blair Henderson (6 goals)

The 2018–19 Scottish Challenge Cup, known as the IRN-BRU Cup due to sponsorship reasons, was the 28th season of the competition. The tournament took on a similar format from the previous season with the addition of two teams from England's National League entering the competition for the first time. This took the total number of participating clubs to 58.

Thirty teams from the Scottish Championship, Scottish League One and Scottish League Two competed, along with four teams from the Highland Football League (one eliminated in preliminary round) and four from the Lowland Football League (one eliminated in preliminary round). In addition to this, Under-21 teams of the clubs competing in the Scottish Premiership were represented. This was the third edition with two clubs from both Northern Ireland's NIFL Premiership and the Welsh Premier League and was the second time that two teams from the League of Ireland entered. A new change was the addition of two entrants from the English National League (fifth tier).

Inverness Caledonian Thistle were the defending champions after they beat Dumbarton 1–0 in the 2018 final, but they lost 1–0 in the first round to Dunfermline Athletic.

Ross County won the competition for the third time, defeating Connah's Quay Nomads 3–1 in the final.

== Format ==
Round	Date	Fixtures	Clubs	New entries
Preliminary round	31 July–1 August 2018	2	58 → 56	Teams placed 3rd and 4th in 2017–18 Lowland Football League & teams placed 3rd and 4th in 2017–18 Highland Football League
First round	14–15 August 2018	24	56 → 32	Teams from 2018–19 Scottish Championship; Teams from 2018–19 Scottish League One; Teams from 2018–19 Scottish League Two; 3 teams from 2018–19 Highland Football League (1st, 2nd and preliminary round winner); 3 teams from 2018–19 Lowland Football League (1st, 2nd and preliminary round winner); 12 U21 teams from 2018–19 Scottish Premiership
Second round	8–9 September 2018	16	32 → 16	2 teams from 2017–18 NIFL Premiership (1st and 2nd); 2 teams from 2017–18 Welsh Premier League (1st and 3rd); 2 teams from 2018 League of Ireland Premier Division (6th and 7th); 2 teams from 2017–18 National League (3rd and 4th)
Third round	13–14 October 2018	8	16 → 8	
Quarter-finals	17–18 November 2018	4	8 → 4	
Semi-finals	16–17 February 2019	2	4 → 2	
Final	24 March 2019	1	2 → 1	

== Preliminary round ==
=== Matches ===
29 July 2018	BSC Glasgow	0–1	East Stirlingshire	Alloa
15:00		Report	Tennant 50' (o.g.)	Stadium: Indodrill Stadium; Attendance: 147; Referee: Chris Graham

1 August 2018	Inverurie Loco Works	2–2 (5–4 p)	Fraserburgh	Inverurie
20:00	McCabe 37'; Smith 68'	Report	Beagrie 8'; Campbell 84'	Stadium: Harlaw Park; Attendance: 399; Referee: Mat Northcroft
	Penalties
	Gauld (penalty scored); Butcher (penalty scored); Layden (penalty scored); Smith (penalty missed); Duff (penalty scored); McCabe (penalty scored)		(penalty scored) Campbell; (penalty scored) Angus; (penalty scored) Christie; (penalty scored) Hay; (penalty missed) Buchan; (penalty missed) Rae

== First round ==
The draw for the first round was made on 26 June 2018 at 1pm live on the SPFL Facebook page.

=== North Section ===
==== Draw ====
Teams in Bold advanced to the second round.

North section

01. **Alloa Athletic**
02. **Arbroath**
03. Brechin City
04. Cowdenbeath
05. **Dundee United**
06. **Dunfermline Athletic**

07. **East Fife**
08. Elgin City
09. Forfar Athletic
10. Inverness CT
11. **Montrose**
12. **Peterhead**

13. **Raith Rovers**
14. **Ross County**
15. Stirling Albion
16. Aberdeen U21s
17. **Dundee U21s**
18. Heart of Midlothian U21s

19. Hibernian U21s
20. **Livingston U21s**
21. St Johnstone U21s
22. Cove Rangers
23. **Formartine United**
24. Inverurie Loco Works

==== Matches ====
14 August 2018	Livingston U21s	**1–0** **(Abandoned)**	Forfar Athletic	Livingston, Scotland
19:45	Watson 30'	Report		Stadium: Almondvale Stadium; Referee: David Dickinson

14 August 2018	**Dundee U21s**	**2–2** (**4–3** p)	Hibernian U21s	Dundee, Scotland
19:45	Bradbury 22'; Jefferies 85'	Report	F. Murray 25'; Mackie 75'	Stadium: Dens Park; Attendance: 191; Referee: Chris Fordyce
	**Penalties**
	Scott (penalty scored); Henvey (penalty scored); Lambert (penalty missed); Dow (penalty scored); Bradbury (penalty scored)		(penalty scored) Gullan; (penalty missed) Stirling; (penalty scored) Waugh; (penalty missed) I. Murray; (penalty scored) Allan

14 August 2018	**Peterhead**	**2–1**	Brechin City	Peterhead, Scotland
19:45	McLean 76'; Leitch 86'	Report	Shields 12'	Stadium: Balmoor Stadium; Attendance: 496; Referee: Steven Kirkland

14 August 2018	Inverness Caledonian Thistle	**1–2**	**Dunfermline Athletic**	Inverness, Scotland
19:45	White 61'	Report	Higginbotham 25' (pen.); Smith 87'	Stadium: Caledonian Stadium; Attendance: 1,046; Referee: Alan Muir

14 August 2018	Heart of Midlothian U21s	**1–2**	**Ross County**	Edinburgh, Scotland
19:45	Keena 44'	Report	McKay 4', 30'	Stadium: Tynecastle Park; Attendance: 344; Referee: Gavin Duncan

14 August 2018	Cowdenbeath	**1–3**	**East Fife**	Cowdenbeath, Scotland
19:45	Sheerin 30'	Report	Goodfellow 68' (o.g.); Dowds 75'; Court 90'	Stadium: Central Park; Attendance: 261; Referee: David Munro

14 August 2018	**Raith Rovers**	**3–1**	Aberdeen U21s	Kirkcaldy, Scotland
19:45	Wedderburn 16'; Matthews 28'; Nisbet 30'	Report	Anderson 72'	Stadium: Stark's Park; Attendance: 479; Referee: Grant Irvine

14 August 2018	**Alloa Athletic**	**3–1**	Stirling Albion	Alloa, Scotland
19:45	Cawley 40', 45'; Flannigan 46'	Report	Hamilton 55'	Stadium: Recreation Park; Attendance: 332; Referee: David Lowe

14 August 2018	Inverurie Loco Works	**0–1**	**Formartine United**	Inverurie, Scotland
20:00		Report	Gethins 61'	Stadium: Harlaw Park; Attendance: 399; Referee: Mike Roncone

15 August 2018	Cove Rangers	**2–2** (**3–4** p)	**Montrose**	Cove Bay, Scotland
19:45	McManus 44', 49'	Report	I. Campbell 34' (pen.); Callaghan 69'	Stadium: Balmoral Stadium; Attendance: 420; Referee: Graham Beaton
	**Penalties**
	Meggison (penalty scored); McManus (penalty scored); McKenzie (penalty missed); Masson (penalty scored); Brown (penalty missed)		(penalty scored) I. Campbell; (penalty missed) Fotheringham; (penalty scored) Steeves; (penalty scored) R. Campbell; (penalty scored) Johnston

15 August 2018	Elgin City	**1–1** (**6–7** p)	**Arbroath**	Elgin, Scotland
19:45	O'Brien 57'	Report	McHardy 83'	Stadium: Borough Briggs; Attendance: 401; Referee: Scott Lambie
	**Penalties**
	McGovern (penalty scored); McHardy (penalty scored); Sutherland (penalty scored); Cameron (penalty missed); McLeish (penalty scored); Lowdon (penalty scored); Byrne (penalty scored); Cooper (penalty missed)		(penalty scored) Wallace; (penalty scored) Hamilton; (penalty missed) Linn; (penalty scored) McCord; (penalty scored) Swankie; (penalty scored) Thomson; (penalty scored) Denholm; (penalty scored) Gold

15 August 2018	**Dundee United**	**3–2**	St Johnstone U21s	Dundee, Scotland
19:45	Chalmers 64'; McMullan 78', 90+2'	Report	Hendry 21', 58'	Stadium: Tannadice Park; Attendance: 700; Referee: Colin Steven

Notes

1. A-The Livingston U21s-Forfar Athletic match was abandoned with Livingston U21s leading 1–0 after 71 minutes due poor lighting caused by a power outage. The match was replayed on 21 August 2018.

==== Replay ====
21 August 2018	**Livingston U21s**	**0–0** (**5–4** p)	Forfar Athletic	Livingston, Scotland
19:45		Report		Stadium: Almondvale Stadium; Attendance: 460; Referee: David Dickinson
	**Penalties**
	Jacobs (penalty scored); McMillan (penalty scored); Clark (penalty scored); Hamilton (penalty scored); Watson (penalty missed); Thomson (penalty scored)		(penalty scored) Munro; (penalty scored) Meechan; (penalty scored) Whyte; (penalty missed) Baird; (penalty scored) Bain; (penalty missed) Malone

=== South Section ===
==== Draw ====
Teams in Bold advanced to the second round.

South section

25. **Airdrieonians**
26. Albion Rovers
27. **Annan Athletic**
28. Ayr United
29. Berwick Rangers
30. Clyde

31. **Dumbarton**
32. **Edinburgh City**
33. **Falkirk**
34. Greenock Morton
35. **Partick Thistle**
36. **Queen of the South**

37. **Queen's Park**
38. Stenhousemuir
39. Stranraer
40. Celtic U21s
41. **Hamilton Academical U21s**
42. Kilmarnock U21s

43. **Motherwell U21s**
44. Rangers U21s
45. **St Mirren U21s**
46. Spartans
47. **East Kilbride**
48. East Stirlingshire

==== Matches ====
14 August 2018	Kilmarnock U21s	**1–2**	**St Mirren U21s**	Kilmarnock, Scotland
19:00	Thomas 48'	Report	Jamieson 10'; MacPherson 55'	Stadium: Rugby Park; Attendance: 208; Referee: Stephen Brown

14 August 2018	Stenhousemuir	**0–3**	**Queen of the South**	Stenhousemuir, Scotland
19:30		Report	Dobbie 59', 66'; Dykes 62'	Stadium: Ochilview Park; Attendance: 387; Referee: Kevin Graham

14 August 2018	Rangers U21s	**1–2**	**Falkirk**	Stirling, Scotland
19:30	Rudden 90'	Report	Lewis 4'; Harrison 21'	Stadium: Forthbank Stadium; Attendance: 636; Referee: Euan Anderson

14 August 2018	**Queen's Park**	**0–0** (**4–2** p)	Ayr United	Glasgow, Scotland
19:45		Report		Stadium: Hampden Park; Attendance: 834; Referee: Greg Aitken
	**Penalties**
	McKernon (penalty missed); Gibson (penalty scored); Mortimer (penalty scored); Roberts (penalty scored); Osadolor (penalty scored)		(penalty scored) Rose; (penalty missed) Murdoch; (penalty scored) Shankland; (penalty missed) Forrest

14 August 2018	**Hamilton Academical U21s**	**4–1**	Clyde	Hamilton, Scotland
19:45	Enigbokan-Bloomfield 8', 90'; Cunningham 62'; Hughes 73'	Report	McStay 9'	Stadium: New Douglas Park; Attendance: 297; Referee: Chris Graham

14 August 2018	East Stirlingshire	**0–3**	**Motherwell U21s**	Falkirk, Scotland
19:45		Report	Turnbull 16'; Watson 20'; Hastie 22'	Stadium: Falkirk Stadium; Attendance: 150; Referee: Duncan Smith

14 August 2018	**Annan Athletic**	**4–0**	Celtic U21s	Annan, Scotland
19:45	Wallace 9'; Fergusson 55', 67', 81'	Report		Stadium: Galabank; Attendance: 266; Referee: Lloyd Wilson

14 August 2018	**Edinburgh City**	**3–1**	Albion Rovers	Edinburgh, Scotland
19:45	Shepherd 70'; Henderson 77', 83' (pen.)	Report	Cunningham 15'	Stadium: Ainslie Park; Attendance: 182; Referee: Steven Reid

14 August 2018	Stranraer	**0–5**	**Partick Thistle**	Stranraer, Scotland
19:45		Report	O'Ware 10'; Fitzpatrick 34', 90+2'; Mbuyi-Mutombo 36'; Melbourne 89'	Stadium: Stair Park; Attendance: 480; Referee: Alan Newlands

14 August 2018	**Dumbarton**	**2–1**	Greenock Morton	Dumbarton, Scotland
19:45	Paton 12'; Russell 26'	Report	Oliver 39'	Stadium: Dumbarton Football Stadium; Attendance: 680; Referee: Gavin Ross

14 August 2018	Berwick Rangers	**0–3**	**Airdrieonians**	Berwick-upon-Tweed, England
19:45		Report	Conroy 2'; Carrick 19'; McIntosh 22' (pen.)	Stadium: Shielfield Park; Attendance: 317; Referee: John McKendrick

15 August 2018	**East Kilbride**	**1–1** (**5–4** p)	Spartans	East Kilbride, Scotland
19:45	McNeil 61'	Report	Cennarazo 3'	Stadium: K-Park Training Academy; Attendance: 207; Referee: Duncan Williams
	**Penalties**
	Winter (penalty scored); Malcolm (penalty scored); Longworth (penalty scored); Reid (penalty scored); Coll (penalty scored)		(penalty scored) Corbett; (penalty scored) Stevenson; (penalty missed) Smith; (penalty scored) Herd; (penalty scored) Maxwell

== Second round ==
Teams from Wales (The New Saints and Connah's Quay Nomads), Northern Ireland (Crusaders and Coleraine), England (Sutton United and Boreham Wood) and the Republic of Ireland (Bohemians and Sligo Rovers) entered in the second round. Originally, Bray Wanderers were to be the second side to represent the League of Ireland however, they were subsequently thrown out by the FAI on 16 July 2018 for failing to pay their players and replaced by Limerick. A similar statement was released by the FAI hours later about Limerick who were also in financial difficulties. St Patrick's Athletic were then invited to compete as the next ranked team in line but declined. Sligo Rovers accepted the position in their place so they would represent the League of Ireland instead.

=== Draw ===
The draw for the second round was made on 16 August 2018 at 1pm live on the SPFL Facebook page.

Teams in Bold advanced to the third round.

Teams in Italics were not known at the time of the draw.

(Scotland) SPFL	Other Scottish	Teams from other countries
Championship: **Alloa Athletic**; Dundee United; **Dunfermline Athletic**; Falkirk; Partick Thistle; **Queen of the South**; **Ross County**; League One: Airdrieonians; **Arbroath**; Dumbarton; **East Fife**; **Montrose**; Raith Rovers; League Two: Annan Athletic; **Edinburgh City**; Peterhead; **Queen's Park**	Highland League: Formartine United; Lowland League: East Kilbride; Premiership U21s: Dundee U21; Hamilton Academical U21; Livingston U21; **Motherwell U21**; **St Mirren U21**	(England) National League: Boreham Wood; **Sutton United**; (Northern Ireland) NIFL Premiership: **Coleraine**; Crusaders; (Wales) Welsh Premier League: **Connah's Quay Nomads**; The New Saints; (Republic of Ireland) Premier Division: **Bohemians**; **Sligo Rovers**

=== Matches ===
6 September 2018	Dundee U21s	**1–2**	**Motherwell U21s**	Dundee, Scotland
19:00	Armstrong 43' (o.g.)	Report	MacDonald 25'; Watson 86'	Stadium: Dens Park; Attendance: 208; Referee: Mike Roncone

8 September 2018	Boreham Wood	**0–0** (**5–6** p)	**Dunfermline Athletic**	Borehamwood, England
13:00		Report		Stadium: Meadow Park; Attendance: 1,001; Referee: Evan Boyce
	**Penalties**
	Murtagh (penalty scored); Umerah (penalty scored); Fyfield (penalty scored); Ilesanmi (penalty scored); Hackett-Fairchild (penalty scored); C. Smith (penalty missed)		(penalty scored) M. Martin; (penalty scored) Craigen; (penalty scored) Hippolyte; (penalty scored) El Bakhtaoui; (penalty scored) Connolly; (penalty scored) Muirhead

8 September 2018	**Queen of the South**	**4–3**	Crusaders	Dumfries, Scotland
14:30	Dobbie 22', 31'; Dykes 25'; Harkins 29'	Report	Patterson 47', 51' (pen.); Heatley 85'	Stadium: Palmerston Park; Attendance: 1,204; Referee: Damian McGrath

8 September 2018	Falkirk	**0–1**	**Connah's Quay Nomads**	Falkirk, Scotland
15:00		Report	Wilde 46'	Stadium: Falkirk Stadium; Attendance: 1,637; Referee: Daniel Middleton

8 September 2018	Airdrieonians	**0–1**	**Sutton United**	Airdrie, Scotland
15:00		Report	Wright 21'	Stadium: Excelsior Stadium; Attendance: 831; Referee: Mark Petch

8 September 2018	Peterhead	**0–1**	**Bohemians**	Peterhead, Scotland
15:00		Report	Devaney 63'	Stadium: Balmoor Stadium; Attendance: 713; Referee: Sam Purkiss

8 September 2018	**East Fife**	**2–1**	Partick Thistle	Methil, Scotland
15:00	Agnew 51'; Currie 74'	Report	Mbuyi-Mutombo 22'	Stadium: Bayview Stadium; Attendance: 932; Referee: Alan Muir

8 September 2018	**Arbroath**	**3–0**	Annan Athletic	Arbroath, Scotland
15:00	Linn 8'; Denholm 71'; McKenna 83'	Report		Stadium: Gayfield Park; Attendance: 524; Referee: Colin Steven

8 September 2018	Dumbarton	**0–1**	**Montrose**	Dumbarton, Scotland
15:00		Report	Johnston 19'	Stadium: Dumbarton Football Stadium; Attendance: 456; Referee: David Munro

8 September 2018	Dundee United	**1–1** (**4–5** p)	**Alloa Athletic**	Dundee, Scotland
15:00	Smith 15'	Report	Trouten 78' (pen.)	Stadium: Tannadice Park; Attendance: 1,040; Referee: Greg Aitken
	**Penalties**
	Fyvie (penalty scored); Thomas (penalty missed); Glass (penalty scored); McMullan (penalty scored); Smith (penalty scored)		(penalty scored) Taggart; (penalty scored) Flannigan; (penalty scored) Zanatta; (penalty scored) Trouten; (penalty scored) Graham

8 September 2018	East Kilbride	**2–3**	**Edinburgh City**	East Kilbride, Scotland
15:00	McNeil 72'; Malcolm 73'	Report	Henderson 36'; Smith 84', 86'	Stadium: K-Park Training Academy; Attendance: 287; Referee: Steven Kirkland

8 September 2018	**St Mirren U21s**	**3–2**	Hamilton Academical U21s	Paisley, Scotland
15:00	Jamieson 10'; MacPherson 39' (pen.); Potter 70'	Report	A. Smith 27'; L. Smith 87'	Stadium: St Mirren Park; Attendance: 316; Referee: Graham Beaton

8 September 2018	**Ross County**	**5–0**	Raith Rovers	Dingwall, Scotland
15:00	Graham 18', 29', 40', 42'; Lindsay 37'	Report		Stadium: Victoria Park; Attendance: 1,232; Referee: John Beaton

8 September 2018	The New Saints	**2–2** (**2–4** p)	**Queen's Park**	Oswestry, England
19:35	Hart 30' (o.g.); Nembhard 90+5'	Report	Osadolor 89'; Hawke 90+1'	Stadium: Park Hall; Attendance: 278; Referee: Bernard Connolly
	**Penalties**
	Mullan (penalty missed); Brobbel (penalty missed); Ebbe (penalty scored); Marriott (penalty scored)		(penalty scored) McLean; (penalty missed) Gibson; (penalty scored) Foy; (penalty scored) Roberts; (penalty scored) Peters

8 September 2018	**Coleraine**	**1–1** (**2–1** p)	Formartine United	Coleraine, Northern Ireland
19:45	Carson 31'	Report	MacPhee 20'	Stadium: The Showgrounds; Attendance: 973; Referee: David Morgan
	**Penalties**
	Parkhill (penalty missed); Carson (penalty missed); McConaghie (penalty scored); Bradley (penalty scored)		(penalty missed) S. Anderson; (penalty missed) Fraser; (penalty missed) MacPhee; (penalty scored) Greig; (penalty missed) Gethins

8 September 2018	**Sligo Rovers**	**4–1**	Livingston U21s	Sligo, Ireland
19:45	Drennan 15', 52', 86'; Cawley 60'	Report	Knox 3'	Stadium: The Showgrounds; Attendance: 408; Referee: Lee Tavinder

== Third round ==
=== Draw ===
The draw for the third round was made on 11 September 2018 at 1pm live on the SPFL Facebook page.

Teams in Bold advanced to the quarter-finals.

(Scotland) SPFL	Teams from other countries
Championship: **Alloa Athletic**; Dunfermline Athletic; Queen of the South; **Ross County**; League One: Arbroath; **East Fife**; Montrose; League Two: **Edinburgh City**; **Queen's Park**; Premiership U21s: **Motherwell U21**; St Mirren U21	(England) National League: Sutton United; (Northern Ireland) NIFL Premiership: Coleraine; (Wales) Welsh Premier League: **Connah's Quay Nomads**; (Republic of Ireland) Premier Division: **Bohemians**; Sligo Rovers

=== Matches ===
12 October 2018	Arbroath	**1–4**	**Edinburgh City**	Arbroath, Scotland
19:35	McKenna 11'	Report	B. Henderson 25' (pen.), 68' (pen.); Shepherd 56'; L. Henderson 78'	Stadium: Gayfield Park; Attendance: 506; Referee: Alan Muir

13 October 2018	**East Fife**	**2–0**	Queen of the South	Methil, Scotland
15:00	Smith 34'; Dowds 78'	Report		Stadium: Bayview Stadium; Attendance: 579; Referee: Barry Cook

13 October 2018	**Bohemians**	**0–0** (**4–3** p)	Sutton United	Dublin, Ireland
15:00		Report		Stadium: Dalymount Park; Attendance: 1,130; Referee: Mike Roncone
	**Penalties**
	Lunney (penalty scored); Pender (penalty scored); Brennan (penalty missed); Stokes (penalty missed); Supple (penalty scored); Cornwall (penalty scored)		(penalty scored) Lafayette; (penalty scored) Davis; (penalty scored) Drinan; (penalty missed) Cadogan; (penalty missed) Eastmond; (penalty missed) Thomas

13 October 2018	Dunfermline Athletic	**2–2** (**4–5** p)	**Alloa Athletic**	Dunfermline, Scotland
15:00	L. Longridge 28', 47' (pen.)	Report	Trouten 8', 70'	Stadium: East End Park; Attendance: 1,469; Referee: Nick Walsh
	**Penalties**
	Craigen (penalty scored); L. Longridge (penalty scored); Hippolyte (penalty scored); Beadling (penalty scored); Connolly (penalty missed)		(penalty scored) Taggart; (penalty scored) Flannigan; (penalty scored) Zanatta; (penalty scored) Trouten; (penalty scored) Graham

13 October 2018	**Ross County**	**3–1**	Montrose	Dingwall, Scotland
15:00	Stewart 20'; Keillor-Dunn 41', 51'	Report	Johnston 44'	Stadium: Victoria Park; Attendance: 1,122; Referee: Craig Napier

13 October 2018	St Mirren U21s	**2–4**	**Queen's Park**	Paisley, Scotland
15:00	Jamieson 2'; Breadner 63'	Report	Hawke 61'; McLean 66', 82' (pen.); East 80'	Stadium: St Mirren Park; Attendance: 507; Referee: Grant Irvine

13 October 2018	**Motherwell U21s**	**2–0**	Sligo Rovers	Motherwell, Scotland
15:00	McClean 12' (o.g.); Mbulu 71'	Report		Stadium: Fir Park; Attendance: 950; Referee: Richard Hulme

13 October 2018	**Connah's Quay Nomads**	**2–0**	Coleraine	Connah's Quay, Wales
19:30	Horan 61'; Owens 90'	Report		Stadium: Deeside Stadium; Attendance: 624; Referee: Colin Steven

== Quarter-finals ==
=== Draw ===
The draw for the quarter-finals was made on 16 October 2018 at 1pm at The Hub in Edinburgh live on the SPFL Facebook page.

Teams in Bold advanced to the semi-finals.

(Scotland)	Teams from other countries
Championship: Alloa Athletic; **Ross County**; League One: **East Fife**; League Two: **Edinburgh City**; Queen's Park; Premiership U21s: Motherwell U21	(Wales) Welsh Premier League: **Connah's Quay Nomads**; (Republic of Ireland) Premier Division: Bohemians

=== Matches ===
16 November 2018	Queen's Park	**1–2**	**Connah's Quay Nomads**	Glasgow, Scotland
19:45	Hawke 64'	Report	Horan 81'; Wilde 84'	Stadium: Hampden Park; Attendance: 559; Referee: David Rock

17 November 2018	**Edinburgh City**	**2–2** (**4–3** p)	Alloa Athletic	Edinburgh, Scotland
15:00	B. Henderson 45'; Shepherd 57'		Zanatta 2'; Trouten 12'	Stadium: Ainslie Park; Attendance: 478; Referee: Don Robertson
	**Penalties**
	L. Henderson (penalty scored); Laird (penalty scored); Smith (penalty scored); Thomson (penalty scored)		(penalty missed) Taggart; (penalty scored) Flannigan; (penalty scored) Zanatta; (penalty scored) Trouten; (penalty missed) Graham

17 November 2018	Motherwell U21s	**1–2**	**Ross County**	Motherwell, Scotland
15:00	Livingstone 53'	Report	Stewart 51', 56'	Stadium: Fir Park; Attendance: 1,209; Referee: David Munro

2 February 2019	Bohemians	**w/o**	**East Fife**	Dublin, Ireland
15:00		Report		Stadium: Dalymount Park

Notes

1. B-The Bohemians-East Fife match was originally due to take place on 17 November 2018 but was rearranged as the Irish football season had finished. It was rearranged to be played on 2 February 2019 but was called off due to a frozen pitch at 14:53, seven minutes before kick-off. Following discussions with the SPFL in an attempt to rearrange the fixture again, Bohemians withdrew from the competition and East Fife advanced to the semi-finals.

== Semi-finals ==
=== Draw ===
The draw for the semi-finals was made on 21 November 2018 at 1pm at Hampden Park live on the SPFL Facebook page.

15 February 2019	Ross County	2–1	East Fife	Dingwall, Scotland
19:45	Armstrong 18'; McManus 37'	Report	Dowds 39'	Stadium: Victoria Park; Attendance: 1,283; Referee: Alan Newlands

16 February 2019	Connah's Quay Nomads	1–1 (a.e.t.) (5–4 p)	Edinburgh City	Connah's Quay, Wales
19:25	Wilde 18'	Report	Walker 2'	Stadium: Deeside Stadium; Attendance: 1,068; Referee: James Oldham
	Penalties
	Morris (penalty scored); Harrison (penalty scored); Disney (penalty scored); Bakare (penalty scored); Wilde (penalty missed); Horan (penalty scored)		(penalty scored) L.Henderson; (penalty scored) Laird; (penalty scored) Donaldson; (penalty missed) Thomson; (penalty scored) B.Henderson; (penalty missed) Diver

== Final ==
23 March 2019	Ross County	3–1	Connah's Quay Nomads	Inverness, Scotland
16:30	Mullin 75', 78'; Lindsay 86'	Report	Bakare 22'	Stadium: Caledonian Stadium; Attendance: 3,057; Referee: Alan Muir

== Player of the Round ==
The Golden Ball Award is a 'Player of the Round' award given to the player who is adjudged to have had the best performance of that round out of all the players in teams left competing in that round of the competition. The winner is voted for by supporters from a chosen short-list of players, which is posted on the Irn-Bru Football Twitter page.

Round	Player	Club	Match	Ref
First Round	(Scotland) Aidan Fitzpatrick	Partick Thistle	5–0 v Stranraer (A)	
Second Round	(Republic of Ireland) Mikey Drennan	Sligo Rovers	4–1 v Livingston U21s (H)	
Third Round	(England) Christian Mbulu	Motherwell U21s	2–0 v Sligo Rovers (H)	
Quarter-finals	(Scotland) Scott Shepherd	Edinburgh City	2–2 v Alloa Athletic (H)	
Semi-finals	(Scotland) Ross Stewart	Ross County	2–1 v East Fife (H)	

== Broadcasting rights ==
The domestic broadcasting rights for the competition are held jointly by BBC Alba, S4C (for matches involving Welsh teams) and subscription channel Premier Sports. Prior to the re-format in the 2016–17 season, BBC Alba had exclusive rights.

One of the semi-final matches was also confirmed as being broadcast live on BT Sport despite no apparent previous announcement of rights.

The following matches were broadcast live on UK television:

Round	BBC Alba	S4C	Premier Sports	BT Sport
Second Round		The New Saints v Queen's Park		
Third Round	Arbroath v Edinburgh City	Connah's Quay Nomads v Coleraine		
Quarter-Finals	Queen's Park v Connah's Quay Nomads			
Semi-Finals	Ross County v East Fife	Connah's Quay Nomads v Edinburgh City		Ross County v East Fife
Final	Ross County v Connah's Quay Nomads	Ross County v Connah's Quay Nomads		Ross County v Connah's Quay Nomads
