= Christian Mbulu =

English footballer (1996–2020)

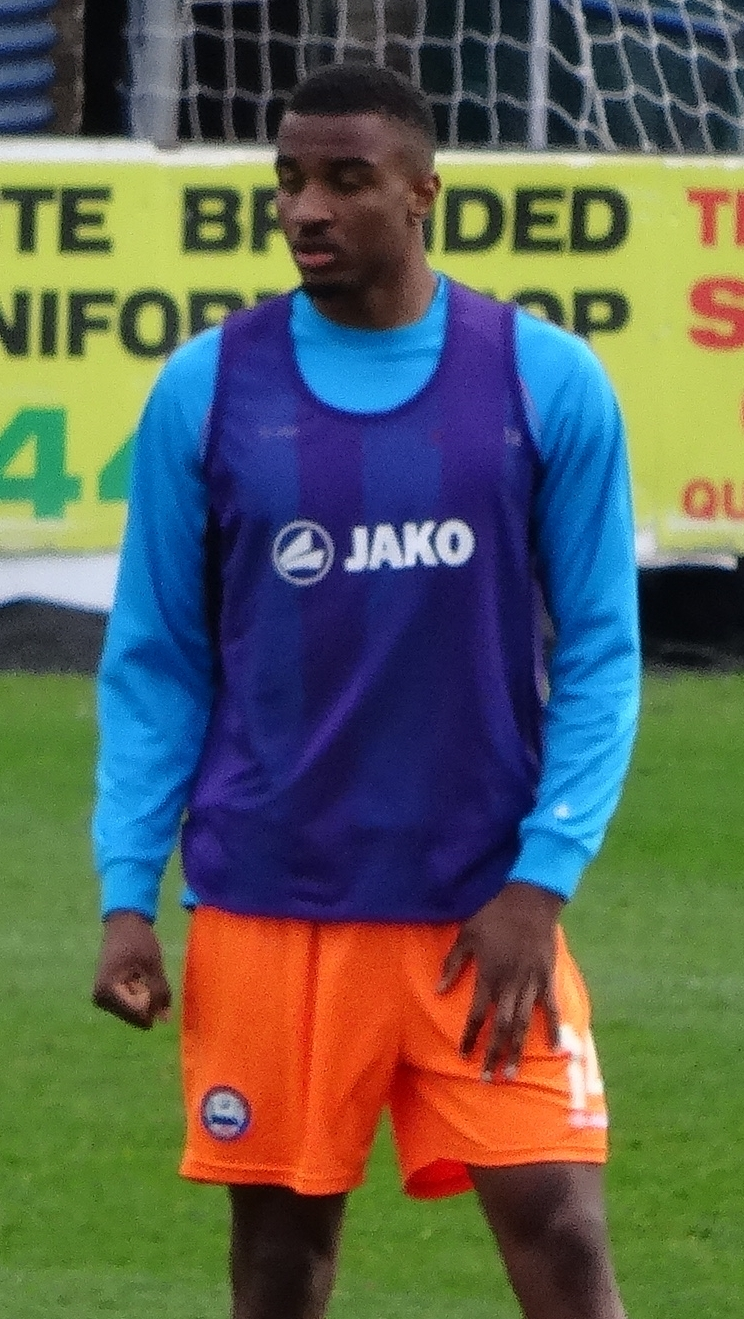
- Mbulu with Braintree Town in April 2017

Personal information
- Full name: Christian Mbulu
- Date of birth: 6 August 1996
- Place of birth: Newham, England
- Date of death: 26 May 2020 (aged 23)
- Place of death: Cottam, England
- Height: 1.93 m (6 ft 4 in)
- Position: Defender

Youth career
- Thurrock
- East Thurrock United

Senior career*
Years	Team	Apps	(Gls)
2013–2015	Brentwood Town	64	(2)
2015–2018	Millwall	0	(0)
2016	→ Canvey Island (loan)	3	(0)
2017	→ Braintree Town (loan)	3	(0)
2018–2019	Motherwell	6	(0)
2019–2020	Crewe Alexandra	4	(0)
2020	Morecambe	3	(0)
Total		83	(2)
- * Club domestic league appearances and goals

Christian Mbulu (6 August 1996 – 26 May 2020) was an English professional footballer who played as a defender. During his career he played for Brentwood Town, Millwall (including loans to Canvey Island and Braintree Town), Motherwell, Crewe Alexandra and Morecambe.

== Club career ==
=== Brentwood Town ===
Mbulu began his senior career at the age of 17 when he signed to non-League club Brentwood Town in the 2013–14 season, following spells at fellow Essex-based clubs Thurrock and East Thurrock United.

=== Millwall ===
After a successful 2015–16 pre-season trial, Mbulu signed his first professional contract for Millwall on his 19th birthday, 6 August 2015. Mbulu rejected a contract offer from Colchester United where he had also been on trial. During his time at the South London club he attracted interest from clubs such Chelsea, Swansea City, Watford, and Crystal Palace and a loan spell to Braintree Town respectively. He spent three seasons at Millwall before they released him at the end of the 2017–18 season.

==== Loans ====
In January 2016, Mbulu joined Canvey Island on a one-month loan. Mbulu made three appearances during his time at the club.

In March 2017, Mbulu moved to Braintree Town on a month-long loan deal.

=== Motherwell ===
On 10 August 2018, Mbulu signed a one-year contract with Motherwell after his release from Millwall at the end of the previous season. In October 2018, Mbulu was named as Player of the Round for the third round of the Scottish Challenge Cup after scoring to help Motherwell's under-21 side to a 2–0 win against League of Ireland club Sligo Rovers. Mbulu made his league debut for Motherwell on 11 November, when he came on as a second-half substitute in the 77th minute of a game against Rangers at Ibrox. On 9 December, two Hearts supporters were arrested on suspicion of racially abusing Mbulu during a match at Tynecastle. On 21 May 2019, Motherwell confirmed that Mbulu would be released at the end of his contract on 31 May 2019.

=== Crewe Alexandra ===
On 30 October 2019, Mbulu signed a short-term contract with Crewe Alexandra until January 2020, making his debut in an EFL Trophy tie against Everton U21s at Gresty Road on 5 November 2019. He left Crewe Alexandra by mutual consent on 24 January 2020.

=== Morecambe ===
Following his release from Crewe, Mbulu joined Morecambe on a deal until the end of the season, making his Morecambe debut in a 2–0 win at Walsall on 28 January 2020.

== Personal life ==
Born to Jean Claude Mbulu and Vicky Nzeba, Mbulu of Congolese descent, grew up in London as the eldest of four brothers surrounded by family, love and football. This was evident from childhood, and at the age of 6 he chose his career path to become a professional footballer.

=== Death ===
Mbulu died on 26 May 2020, aged 23. Police were called to his home in Preston and did not treat the death as suspicious. His team placed a picture of him on the substitutes bench during a visit to Chelsea in the FA Cup in January 2021 and at the Wembley play-off final against Newport in May 2021.

Following his death the Christian Mbulu Trust was subsequently setup in his memory to empower, guide and assist young people in their own journeys through life.

== Career statistics ==
Appearances and goals by club, season and competition
Club	Season	League			National Cup		League Cup		Other		Total	
Club	Season	Division	Apps	Goals	Apps	Goals	Apps	Goals	Apps	Goals	Apps	Goals
Brentwood Town	2013–14	Isthmian League	26	0	0	0	0	0	2	0	28	0
Brentwood Town	2014–15	Isthmian League	38	2	0	0	0	0	6	0	44	2
Brentwood Town	Total		64	2	0	0	0	0	8	0	72	2
Millwall	2015–16	League One	0	0	0	0	0	0	0	0	0	0
Millwall	2016–17	League One	0	0	0	0	0	0	0	0	0	0
Millwall	2017–18	Championship	0	0	0	0	0	0	—		0	0
Millwall	Total		0	0	0	0	0	0	0	0	0	0
Canvey Island (loan)	2015–16	Isthmian League	3	0	0	0	0	0	0	0	3	0
Braintree Town (loan)	2016–17	National League	3	0	0	0	—		0	0	3	0
Motherwell	2018–19	Scottish Premiership	6	0	0	0	0	0	3 (Note: Matches in the Scottish Challenge Cup, in which age-restricted teams from the Scottish Premiership clubs compete against senior clubs.)	1	9	1
Crewe Alexandra	2019–20	League Two	4	0	2	0	0	0	1 (Note: Appearance in EFL Trophy)	0	7	0
Morecambe	2019–20	League Two	3	0	0	0	0	0	0	0	3	0
Career total			83	2	2	0	0	0	12	1	97	3
