= Adam Livingstone =

Scottish footballer

Personal information
- Date of birth: 22 February 1998 (age 28)
- Place of birth: Law, Scotland
- Positions: Left-back; left winger

Youth career
- 2008–2017: Motherwell

Senior career*
Years	Team	Apps	(Gls)
2017–2020	Motherwell	5	(0)
2018	→ East Fife (loan)	9	(0)
2019–2020	→ Greenock Morton (loan)	4	(0)
2020	→ Clyde (loan)	6	(0)
2020–2021	Cove Rangers	11	(0)
2021–2022	Clyde	34	(0)
2022	Stafford Rangers	9	(2)
2022	Hednesford Town	20	(1)
2023	AFC Telford United	18	(1)
2023–2024	Hereford	21	(0)
2024	Buxton	15	(0)
2024–2025	East Kilbride	17	(0)
2025–2026	Dumbarton	34	(0)
2026–	Forfar Athletic	1	(0)
2026–	→ Johnstone Burgh (loan)	3	(0)
- * Club domestic league appearances and goals as of 22:18, 2 October 2026 (UTC)

Adam Livingstone (born 22 February 1998) is a Scottish footballer who plays as a left-back or a left winger. He has previously played for Motherwell, East Fife, Greenock Morton, Cove Rangers, Clyde, Stafford Rangers, Hednesford Town, AFC Telford United, Hereford, Buxton, East Kilbride and Dumbarton.

== Career ==
On 16 May 2017, Livingstone made his debut for Motherwell as a substitute in a 3–1 victory against Kilmarnock. On 31 January 2018, Livingstone signed for East Fife on loan until the end of the season.

On 29 March 2019, Livingstone extended his contract with Motherwell until the summer of 2020. He moved to Greenock Morton on a season-long loan on 2 September 2019. He returned to Motherwell on 31 January 2020, his loan having been terminated early at Motherwell's request. On 4 February 2020, he was sent on loan again, to Clyde for the remainder of the season. On 31 May, Motherwell confirmed that Livingstone would be leaving the club after his contract expired.

Livingstone signed a two-year contract with Cove Rangers in August 2020.

He returned to Clyde in June 2021 for the season, where he won Player of the Year.

In the summer of 2022, Adam moved to England and played for Stafford Rangers, Hednesford Town and AFC Telford United during the 2022–23 season.

On 30 May 2023, it was announced that Livingstone had signed for National League North club Hereford, and made his debut on the right wing in their opening league fixture of the season.

On 2 February 2024, it was announced that Livingstone had signed for fellow National League North club Buxton for an undisclosed fee. After a season with East Kilbride where he won promotion from the Lowland League, Livingstone signed for Dumbarton in June 2025. He played 40 times for the Sons in his solitary season at the club.

== Career statistics ==
As of end of 2025–26 season

Appearances and goals by club, season and competition
Club	Season	League			National cup (Note: Includes Scottish Cup, FA Cup)		League cup (Note: Includes Scottish League Cup, EFL Cup)		Other		Total	
Club	Season	Division	Apps	Goals	Apps	Goals	Apps	Goals	Apps	Goals	Apps	Goals
Motherwell	2016–17	Scottish Premiership	2	0	0	0	0	0	1 (Note: Appearance(s) in Scottish Challenge Cup)	0	3	0
Motherwell	2017–18	Scottish Premiership	0	0	0	0	0	0	2	1	2	1
Motherwell	2018–19	Scottish Premiership	3	0	0	0	0	0	4	1	7	1
Motherwell	2019–20	Scottish Premiership	0	0	0	0	0	0	0	0	0	0
Motherwell	Total		5	0	0	0	0	0	7	2	12	2
East Fife (loan)	2017–18	Scottish League Two	9	0	0	0	0	0	0	0	9	0
Greenock Morton (loan)	2019–20	Scottish Championship	4	0	0	0	0	0	1	0	5	0
Clyde (loan)	2019–20	Scottish League One	6	0	1	0	0	0	0	0	7	0
Cove Rangers	2020–21	Scottish League One	11	0	1	0	4	0	0	0	16	0
Clyde	2021–22	Scottish League One	34	0	0	0	4	0	1	0	39	0
Stafford Rangers	2022–23	Northern Premier League; Premier Division	9	2	1	0	—		0	0	10	2
Hednesford Town	2022–23	Southern League; Premier Division Central	20	1	0	0	—		1 (Note: Appearance(s) in FA Trophy)	0	21	1
AFC Telford United	2022–23	National League North	18	1	0	0	—		0	0	18	1
Hereford	2023–24	National League North	21	0	3	0	—		2	0	26	0
Buxton	2023–24	National League North	15	0	—		—		1 (Note: Appearance in Derbyshire Senior Cup)	0	16	0
Dumbarton	2025–26	Scottish League Two	34	0	1	0	2	0	3	0	40	0
Career total			186	4	7	0	13	0	18	3	224	7
