= Jake Hastie =

Scottish footballer (born 1999)

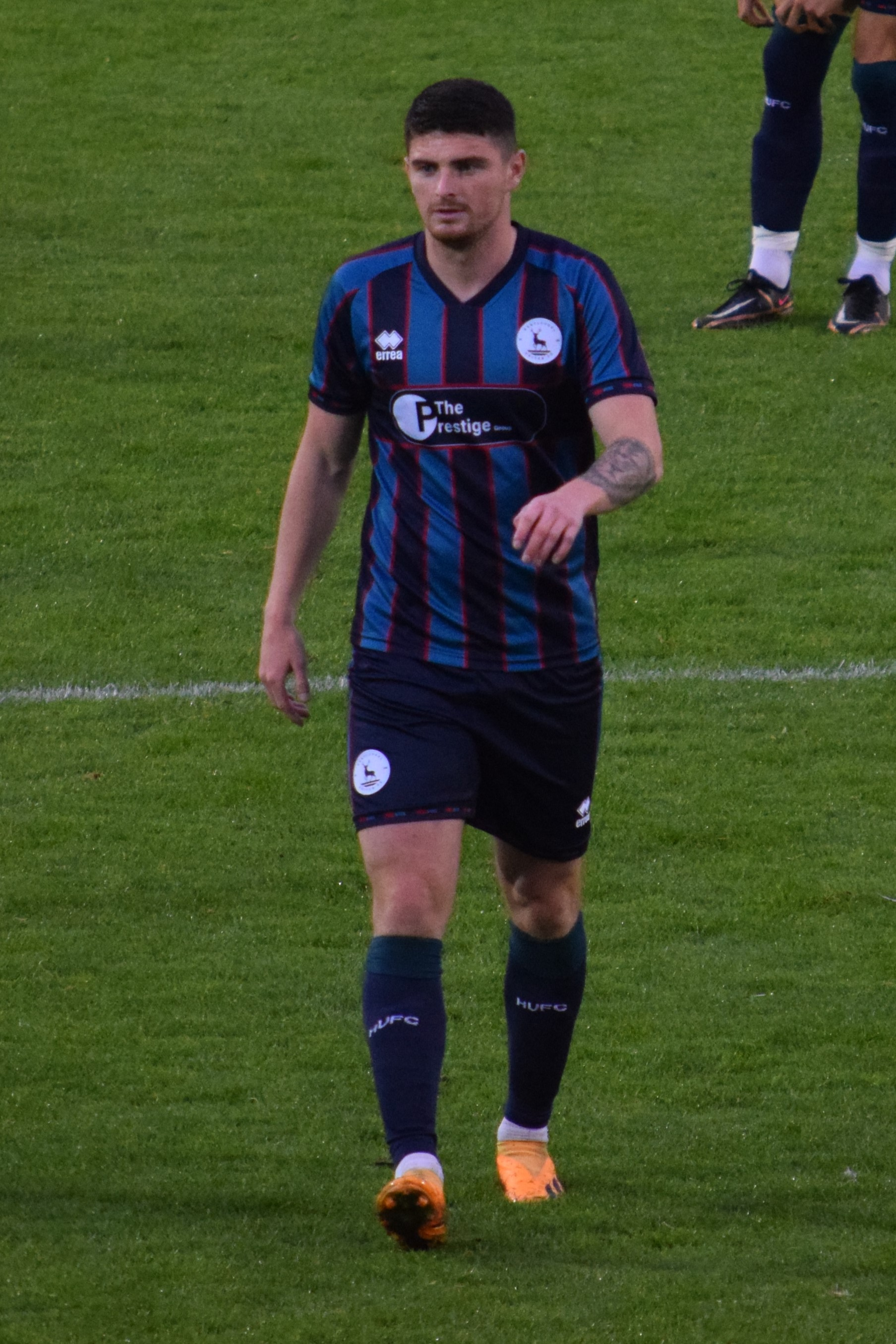
- Hastie playing for Hartlepool United in 2023

Personal information
- Date of birth: 18 March 1999 (age 27)
- Place of birth: Law, Scotland
- Height: 5 ft 11 in (1.81 m)
- Position: Winger

Team information
- Current team: Airdrieonians
- Number: 33

Youth career
- 2009–2016: Motherwell

Senior career*
Years	Team	Apps	(Gls)
2016–2019	Motherwell	17	(6)
2017–2018	→ Airdrieonians (loan)	31	(2)
2018	→ Alloa Athletic (loan)	19	(1)
2019–2022	Rangers	0	(0)
2019–2020	→ Rotherham United (loan)	14	(3)
2020–2021	→ Motherwell (loan)	14	(0)
2021–2022	→ Partick Thistle (loan)	6	(0)
2022	→ Linfield (loan)	9	(0)
2022–2024	Hartlepool United	32	(4)
2024	→ Hamilton Academical (loan)	14	(3)
2024–2025	Ayr United	30	(0)
2025	→ Airdrieonians (loan)	10	(0)
2026–	Airdrieonians	8	(0)

International career^{‡}
2019	Scotland U21	2	(0)
- * Club domestic league appearances and goals as of 08:51, 3 May 2026 (UTC) ‡ National team caps and goals as of 21:47, 4 April 2019 (UTC)

Jake Hastie (born 18 March 1999) is a Scottish footballer who plays as a winger for Scottish Championship club Airdrieonians.

Hastie is a product of the Motherwell academy, and has previously played for Motherwell (two spells), Airdrieonians, Alloa Athletic, Rangers, Rotherham United, Partick Thistle, Linfield, Hartlepool United and Hamilton Academical.

== Club career ==
=== Motherwell ===
Raised in Carfin, Hastie joined the Motherwell Youth Academy in 2009. He was selected for the Scotland football team (represented by North Lanarkshire school pupils) at the 2014 International Children's Games alongside Well colleague David Turnbull, who had already been a teammate for several years during their youth careers. On 27 April 2016, Hastie was part of the Motherwell team that won the Scottish Youth Cup, beating Heart of Midlothian 5–2.

On 15 October 2016, Hastie made his senior debut for Motherwell as a substitute in a 2–0 defeat against Celtic. He signed a new two-and-a-half-year deal with Motherwell in January 2017.

In August 2017, he went out on a six-month development loan to Airdrieonians which was subsequently extended until the end of the season. He was loaned to Alloa Athletic in July 2018.

On his first league start for Motherwell on 23 January 2019, with a "slick move", Hastie provided David Turnbull with an assist for the only goal of a win over Hibernian. On 2 February it was the role of Turnbull, via a free kick, to set up a headed goal for Hastie – who also netted the third – in a 3–0 victory over Livingston. Hastie then scored again four days later with the first goal of the match, a "stunning 20-yard drive", as Motherwell defeated St Mirren 2–1, and on 17 February opened the scoring again as his team defeated Hearts at Fir Park by the same scoreline. As his good form drew increasing attention from supporters and the media, he commented that he was an admirer of Gareth Bale and had been studying the Welsh player's moves to improve his game. In March 2019 he won the Scottish Premiership Player of the Month award for February, and was linked with a transfer to a bigger club. Hastie was nominated for the 2018–19 PFA Scotland Young Player of the Year, along with David Turnbull; the award was won by Ryan Kent.

=== Rangers ===
On 1 May 2019, Rangers announced that Hastie had agreed a pre-contract with the club, signing a four-year contract with the move to be completed in the coming summer and a compensation payment to be made to Motherwell in recognition of his development at the club, reported as being around £350,000.

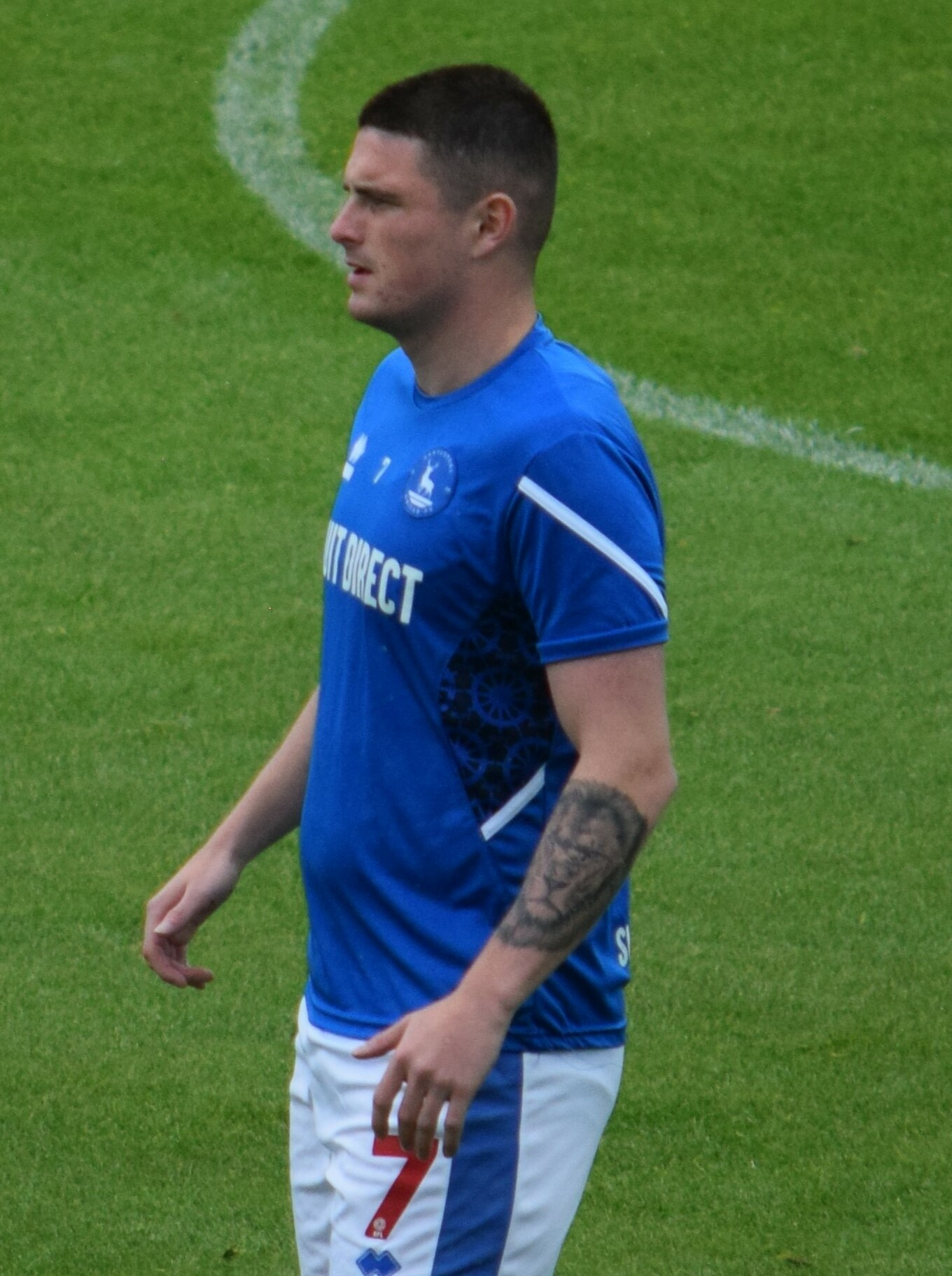
Hastie warming up for Hartlepool United in 2022

Hastie was loaned to Rotherham United in September 2019. He scored the opening goal on his debut in the EFL League One match against Doncaster Rovers on 7 September 2019. He was recalled on 28 January 2020.

On 3 July 2020, Hastie made a return to Motherwell on a season-long loan deal.

Hastie was loaned to Scottish Championship club Partick Thistle in August 2021. He returned to Rangers in January 2022.

On 29 January 2022 Hastie joined NIFL Premiership side Linfield on loan until the end of the 2021–22 season.

=== Hartlepool United ===
On 24 June 2022, Hastie signed for League Two side Hartlepool United. On 5 August 2023, Hastie scored his first Hartlepool goal in a 3–2 defeat to Barnet. In January 2024, he signed on loan for Hamilton Academical until the end of the season. He was released by Hartlepool United at the end of the 2023–24 season.

=== Ayr United ===
On 8 July 2024, Hastie signed for Scottish Championship club Ayr United on a one-year deal.

== International career ==
Hastie was selected for the Scotland under-21 squad in March 2019; He made his debut on 22 March.

== Career statistics ==
As of match played 14 April 2026

Club	Season	League			Cup		League Cup		Other		Total	
Club	Season	Division	Apps	Goals	Apps	Goals	Apps	Goals	Apps	Goals	Apps	Goals
Motherwell	2016–17	Scottish Premiership	3	0	0	0	0	0	2 (Note: Appearance(s) in Scottish Challenge Cup)	0	5	0
Motherwell	2017–18	Scottish Premiership	0	0	0	0	0	0	1	0	1	0
Motherwell	2018–19	Scottish Premiership	14	6	1	1	0	0	4	1	19	8
Motherwell	Total		17	6	1	1	0	0	7	1	25	8
Airdrieonians (loan)	2017–18	Scottish League One	31	2	1	1	0	0	0	0	32	3
Alloa Athletic (loan)	2018–19	Scottish Championship	19	1	0	0	4	2	0	0	23	3
Rangers	2019–20	Scottish Premiership	0	0	0	0	1	0	1 (Note: One appearance in UEFA Europa League)	0	3	0
Rangers	2020–21	Scottish Premiership	0	0	0	0	0	0	0	0	0	0
Rangers	Total		0	0	0	0	1	0	2	0	3	0
Rotherham United (loan)	2019–20	League One	14	3	1	0	0	0	1 (Note: Appearance in EFL Trophy)	0	16	3
Motherwell (loan)	2020–21	Scottish Premiership	14	0	2	0	0	0	1 (Note: Appearance in UEFA Europa League)	0	17	0
Partick Thistle (loan)	2021–22	Scottish Championship	6	0	0	0	0	0	0	0	6	0
Linfield (loan)	2021–22	NIFL Premiership	9	0	1	0	0	0	0	0	10	0
Hartlepool United	2022–23	League Two	18	0	4	0	1	0	1	0	24	0
Hartlepool United	2023–24	National League	14	4	1	0	0	0	2 (Note: Appearance(s) in FA Trophy)	0	17	4
Hartlepool United	Total		32	4	5	0	1	0	3	0	41	4
Hamilton Academical (loan)	2023–24	Scottish League One	14	3	0	0	0	0	0	0	14	3
Ayr United	2024–25	Scottish Championship	25	0	1	1	4	1	2	0	32	2
Ayr United	2025–26	Scottish Championship	5	0	0	0	3	0	0	0	8	0
Ayr United	Total		30	0	1	1	7	1	2	0	40	2
Airdrieonians	2025–26	Scottish Championship	18	0	1	0	0	0	4	1	23	1
Career total			204	19	13	3	13	3	20	2	250	27

== Honours ==
Linfield

- NIFL Premiership: 2021–22

Hamilton Academical

- Scottish Championship play-off winners: 2024
