= 2024–25 Queen of the South F.C. season =

Queen of the South
2024–25 season
- Chairman: Billy Hewitson
- Manager: Peter Murphy
- Stadium: Palmerston Park
- Scottish League One: 3rd
- Scottish Cup: Fourth round
- League Cup: Group stages
- Challenge Cup: Third round
- Top goalscorer: League: Adam Brooks (10); All: Adam Brooks (10)
- Highest home attendance: 2,702 vs. Annan Athletic, 28 December 2024
- Lowest home attendance: 775 vs. Inverness Caledonian Thistle, 21 January 2025
- Average home league attendance: 1,235
Home colours	Away colours

The 2024–25 season is Queen of the South's third consecutive season back in the third tier of Scottish football, in Scottish League One. Queens are also competing in the Challenge Cup, League Cup and the Scottish Cup.

== Summary ==
Queens finished third in Scottish League One in their third season back in Scottish Football's third tier and their league position qualified the club for the semi-final stage of the play-offs, where the played Cove Rangers and were defeated 2–1 on aggregate.

Queens reached the third round of the Challenge Cup, losing 3-0 to Airdrieonians at Palmerston Park.

The Doonhamers were knocked out after the first round of the League Cup after the completion of fixtures in Group A that included Aberdeen, Airdrieonians, Dumbarton and East Kilbride.

Queens reached the fourth round of the Scottish Cup, losing 3-1 to St Mirren at Palmerston Park.

== Results and fixtures ==
Win Draw Loss Abandoned or Postponed

=== Preseason ===
22 June 2024 Friendly	Abbey Vale	0-7	Queen of the South	New Abbey
15:00		Daily Record Report		Stadium: Maryfield Park

25 June 2024 Friendly	Queen of the South	1-3	Clyde	Dumfries
19:45	Dickenson 27'	Bully Wee Report	Redfern 17'; Connell 43'; Rennie 45'	Stadium: Palmerston Park

29 June 2024 Friendly	Greenock Morton	1-0	Queen of the South	Greenock
15:00	Reynolds 85'	Ton Report		Stadium: Cappielow Park

6 July 2024 Friendly	Queen of the South	0-1	Stirling Albion	Dumfries
15:00		Binos Report	Carrick 23'	Stadium: Palmerston Park

=== Scottish League One ===
3 August 2024 Match 1	Alloa Athletic	0-0	Queen of the South	Alloa
15:00		QOSFC Report; SPFL Report		Stadium: Indodrill Stadium; Attendance: 767; Referee: Lee; Man of the Match: Brydon

10 August 2024 Match 2	Queen of the South	2-1	Cove Rangers	Dumfries
15:00	McKechnie 69'; Hewitt 71'	QOSFC Report; SPFL Report	Emslie 62'	Stadium: Palmerston Park; Attendance: 1,126; Referee: Gamble; Man of the Match: Hewitt

17 August 2024 Match 3	Queen of the South	2-0	Annan Athletic	Dumfries
15:00	Douglas 11'; McKechnie 81'	QOSFC Report; SPFL Report		Stadium: Palmerston Park; Attendance: 2,214; Referee: Graham; Man of the Match: Cochrane

24 August 2024 Match 4	Montrose	1-0	Queen of the South	Montrose
17:30	Brown 21'	QOSFC Report; SPFL Report		Stadium: Links Park; Attendance: 377; Referee: Grainger; Man of the Match: Brydon

31 August 2021 Match 5	Inverness Caledonian Thistle	1-0	Queen of the South	Inverness
15:00	McKay 19'	ICTFC Report; SPFL Report		Stadium: Caledonian Stadium; Attendance: 1,703; Referee: Duncan; Man of the Match: Lyon

14 September 2024 Match 6	Queen of the South	2-1	Arbroath	Dumfries
15:00	McKechnie 6'; Lyon 48'	QOSFC Report; SPFL Report	Dow 10'	Stadium: Palmerston Park; Attendance: 996; Referee: Graves; Man of the Match: Dickenson

21 September 2024 Match 7	Stenhousemuir	0-0	Queen of the South	Larbert
15:00		QOSFC Report; SPFL Report		Stadium: Ochilview Park; Attendance: 583; Referee: Kirkland; Man of the Match: Kennedy

28 September 2024 Match 8	Queen of the South	2-0	Dumbarton	Dumfries
15:00	O'Donnell 14'; Hewitt 50'; McIntosh (penalty missed) 84'	QOSFC Report; SPFL Report	Durnan (red card) 71'	Stadium: Palmerston Park; Attendance: 1,146; Referee: Hanvidge; Man of the Match: O'Donnell

5 October 2024 Match 9	Queen of the South	1-5	Kelty Hearts	Dumfries
15:00	Hewitt 58'; Douglas (yellow card) 24' (yellow-red card) 67'	QOSFC Report; SPFL Report	Cunningham 26', 35' (pen.); Williamson 41', 70'; Harding 63'	Stadium: Palmerston Park; Attendance: 1,342; Referee: Kirkland; Man of the Match: O'Donnell

19 October 2024 Match 10	Cove Rangers	2-0	Queen of the South	Aberdeen
15:00	Fyvie 35'; Megginson 82'	QOSFC Report; SPFL Report		Stadium: Balmoral Stadium; Attendance: 519; Referee: Napier; Man of the Match: Kennedy

26 October 2024 Match 11	Annan Athletic	1-0	Queen of the South	Annan
17:30	A. Smith 57'	QOSFC Report; SPFL Report		Stadium: Galabank; Attendance: 1,005; Referee: Grieve; Man of the Match: Kennedy

2 November 2024 Match 12	Queen of the South	1-0	Montrose	Dumfries
15:00	Willis 17'; Kennedy (penalty missed) 86'	QOSFC Report; SPFL Report	Masson (red card) 58'; Gardyne (red card) 85'	Stadium: Palmerston Park; Attendance: 945; Referee: Napier; Man of the Match: Kennedy

9 November 2024 Match 13	Queen of the South	1-1	Alloa Athletic	Dumfries
17:30	Walker 59'	QOSFC Report; SPFL Report	Rankin 53'	Stadium: Palmerston Park; Attendance: 853; Referee: McFarlane; Man of the Match: MacIntyre

16 November 2024 Match 14	Dumbarton	2-1	Queen of the South	Dumbarton
15:00	Ruth 73'; Wallace 90+5' (pen.)	QOSFC Report; SPFL Report	Doherty 83'	Stadium: Marbill Coaches Stadium; Attendance: 708; Referee: Kirkland; Man of the Match: Doherty

23 November 2024	Queen of the South	P – P	Inverness Caledonian Thistle	Dumfries
15:00		QOSFC News		Stadium: Palmerston Park
Note: Postponed due to waterlogged pitch

7 December 2024 Match 15	Arbroath	2-1	Queen of the South	Arbroath
17:30	Murray 76'; Gallagher 90+1'	QOSFC Report; SPFL Report	Douglas 72'	Stadium: Greenversity Stadium at Gayfield; Attendance: 709; Referee: Whyte; Man of the Match: Douglas

14 December 2024 Match 16	Queen of the South	2-1	Stenhousemuir	Dumfries
15:00	Lyon 12'; Brooks 59'	QOSFC Report; SPFL Report	C. O'Donnell 64'	Stadium: Palmerston Park; Attendance: 906; Referee: Williams; Man of the Match: Dickenson

21 December 2024 Match 17	Kelty Hearts	2-0	Queen of the South	Kelty
15:00	Cunningham 64', 87' (pen.)	QOSFC Report; SPFL Report		Stadium: New Central Park; Attendance: 434; Referee: Soutar; Man of the Match: O'Donnell

28 December 2024 Match 18	Queen of the South	1-1	Annan Athletic	Dumfries
15:00	Brooks 17'	QOSFC Report; SPFL Report	Gibson 87' (pen.)	Stadium: Palmerston Park; Attendance: 2,702; Referee: Napier; Man of the Match: Brooks

4 January 2025 Match 19	Queen of the South	1-0	Cove Rangers	Dumfries
15:00	Hewitt 23'	QOSFC Report; SPFL Report		Stadium: Palmerston Park; Attendance: 915; Referee: Nicolson; Man of the Match: Hewitt

11 January 2025 Match 20	Alloa Athletic	1-1	Queen of the South	Alloa
15:00	Taggart 90+2' (pen.)	QOSFC Report; SPFL Report	Luissint 4'; Lyon (penalty missed) 59'	Stadium: Indodrill Stadium; Attendance: 732; Referee: Grieve; Man of the Match: Dickenson

21 January 2025 Match 21	Queen of the South	3-2	Inverness Caledonian Thistle	Dumfries
19:45	Brooks 12', 53'; Allan 79'	QOSFC Report; SPFL Report	Bavidge 10'; Bray 74'	Stadium: Palmerston Park; Attendance: 775; Referee: Duncan; Man of the Match: Luissint

25 January 2025 Match 22	Queen of the South	3-1	Dumbarton	Dumfries
15:00	Brooks 3', 54'; Dickenson 66'	QOSFC Report; SPFL Report	Durnan 28'	Stadium: Palmerston Park; Attendance: 1,027; Referee: Wilson; Man of the Match: Walker

1 February 2025 Match 23	Inverness Caledonian Thistle	1-0	Queen of the South	Inverness
15:00	Bavidge 36'	QOSFC Report; SPFL Report	Brydon (yellow card) 72' (yellow-red card) 81'	Stadium: Caledonian Stadium; Attendance: 1,726; Referee: Grieve; Man of the Match: Lyon

8 February 2025 Match 24	Stenhousemuir	2-1	Queen of the South	Larbert
15:00	Alston 12'; C. O'Donnell 28'	QOSFC Report; SPFL Report	Allan (penalty missed) 16'; Dickenson 90+1'	Stadium: Ochilview Park; Attendance: 630; Referee: Kirkland; Man of the Match: L. Smith

15 February 2025 Match 25	Queen of the South	0-3	Arbroath	Dumfries
15:00		QOSFC Report; SPFL Report	Stewart 13'; Taylor 22'; Douglas 26' (o.g.)	Stadium: Palmerston Park; Attendance: 1,203; Referee: Williams; Man of the Match: Doherty

22 February 2025 Match 26	Montrose	0-3	Queen of the South	Montrose
15:00		QOSFC Report; SPFL Report	Brooks 20' (pen.) (penalty missed) 79'; Cochrane 80'; Bryden 85' (pen.)	Stadium: Links Park; Attendance: 573; Referee: Snedden; Man of the Match: Dickenson

1 March 2025 Match 27	Queen of the South	0-1	Kelty Hearts	Dumfries
15:00		QOSFC Report; SPFL Report	Moore 45+4'	Stadium: Palmerston Park; Attendance: 923; Referee: Grainger; Man of the Match: Dickenson

8 March 2025 Match 28	Cove Rangers	3-1	Queen of the South	Aberdeen
15:00	Yule 28'; Emslie 36', 62'	QOSFC Report; SPFL Report	Lyon 7'	Stadium: Balmoral Stadium; Attendance: 411; Referee: Anderson; Man of the Match: Lyon

15 March 2025 Match 29	Queen of the South	3-2	Alloa Athletic	Dumfries
15:00	O'Donnell 11'; L. Smith 24'; Kennedy 50'	QOSFC Report; SPFL Report	Rankin 38', 69'	Stadium: Palmerston Park; Attendance: 934; Referee: Luke; Man of the Match: Kennedy

22 March 2025 Match 30	Dumbarton	0-0	Queen of the South	Dumbarton
15:00		QOSFC Report; SPFL Report		Stadium: Marbill Coaches Stadium; Attendance: 688; Referee: Whtye; Man of the Match: Lyon

29 March 2025 Match 31	Queen of the South	4-1	Inverness Caledonian Thistle	Dumfries
15:00	Hannah 29'; Allan 57'; Brooks 68', 89'	QOSFC Report; SPFL Report	Stewart 24'	Stadium: Palmerston Park; Attendance: 1,006; Referee: Williams; Man of the Match: Brooks

5 April 2025 Match 32	Annan Athletic	0-2	Queen of the South	Annan
17:30		QOSFC Report; SPFL Report	Brooks (penalty missed) 44'; L. Smith 57'; Allan 72'	Stadium: Galabank; Attendance: 1,353; Referee: Steven; Man of the Match: L. Smith

12 April 2025 Match 33	Queen of the South	2-1	Montrose	Dumfries
15:00	Brooks 6'; Allan 61'	QOSFC Report; SPFL Report	Masson (yellow card) 13' (yellow-red card) 39'; Lyons 80'	Stadium: Palmerston Park; Attendance: 978; Referee: Kirkland; Man of the Match: Cochrane

19 April 2025 Match 34	Kelty Hearts	1-3	Queen of the South	Kelty
15:00	MacIntyre 3'	QOSFC Report; SPFL Report	Luissint 28'; Allan 63'; Kennedy 69'	Stadium: New Central Park; Attendance: 590; Referee: McFarlane; Man of the Match: Luissint

26 April 2025 Match 35	Queen of the South	2-0	Stenhousemuir	Dumfries
15:00	Bryden 59'; Cochrane 63' (pen.)	QOSFC Report; SPFL Report	C. O'Donnell (penalty missed) 79'	Stadium: Palmerston Park; Attendance: 2,242; Referee: Stuart; Man of the Match: Stewart

3 May 2025 Match 36	Arbroath	1-1	Queen of the South	Arbroath
15:00	Dow 75'; O'Brien (yellow card) 68' (yellow-red card) 84'	QOSFC Report; SPFL Report	Lyon 43'; Bryden (penalty missed) 85'	Stadium: Greenversity Stadium at Gayfield; Attendance: 2,314; Referee: Soutar; Man of the Match: O'Donnell

=== Championship play-offs ===
6 May 2025 Semi Final 1st Leg	Queen of the South	0-0	Cove Rangers	Dumfries
19:45		QOSFC Report; BBC Sport Report		Stadium: Palmerston Park; Attendance: 1,784; Referee: Lee; Man of the Match: Hannah

10 May 2025 Semi Final 2nd Leg	Cove Rangers	2-1 (2-1 agg.)	Queen of the South	Aberdeen
15:00	Megginson 8' (pen.); Yule 47'	QOSFC Report; BBC Sport Report	Kennedy 77'	Stadium: Balmoral Stadium; Attendance: 1,065; Referee: Scott; Man of the Match: Kennedy

=== Scottish League Cup ===
13 July 2024 Round 1;Group A-1	Queen of the South	0-3	Aberdeen	Dumfries
17:15		QOSFC Report; SPFL Report	Sokler 6', 37'; Shinnie 23'	Stadium: Palmerston Park; Attendance: 2,274; Referee: D. Robertson; Man of the Match: Lyon

16 July 2024 Round 1; Group A-2	Queen of the South	2-0	Dumbarton	Dumfries
19:45	McIntosh 7'; McKechnie 58'	QOSFC Report; SPFL Report		Stadium: Palmerston Park; Attendance: 778; Referee: Luke; Man of the Match: McKechnie

23 July 2024 Round 1; Group A-3	East Kilbride	1-3	Queen of the South	East Kilbride
19:45	Fagan 33'; McDonald (yellow card) 22' (yellow-red card) 76'	QOSFC Report; SPFL Report	Walker 41'; Lyon 42'; Dickenson 45+3'	Stadium: K-Park Training Academy; Attendance: 400; Referee: Grieve; Man of the Match: Lyon

27 July 2024 Round 1; Group A-4	Airdrieonians	2-0	Queen of the South	Airdrie
15:00	Wilson 44'; Agyemang 64'	QOSFC Report; SPFL Report		Stadium: Excelsior Stadium; Attendance: 1,156; Referee: Duncan; Man of the Match: Dickenson

=== Scottish Challenge Cup ===
7 September 2023 Round 3	Queen of the South	0-3	Airdrieonians	Dumfries
15:00		QOSFC Report; SPFL Report	Frizzell 8'; Mochrie 64'; McGregor 71'	Stadium: Palmerston Park; Attendance: 957; Referee: Wilson; Man of the Match: Cochrane

=== Scottish Cup ===
30 November 2024 Round 3	Arbroath	0-1	Queen of the South	Arbroath
15:00		QOSFC Report; BBC Sport Report	Doherty 81'	Stadium: Greenversity Stadium at Gayfield; Attendance: 818; Referee: Stuart; Man of the Match: MacIntyre

18 January 2025 Round 4	Queen of the South	1-3	St Mirren	Dumfries
15:00	Dickenson 75'	QOSFC Report; BBC Sport Report	Olusanya 10', 21'; Boyd-Munce 90+4'	Stadium: Palmerston Park; Attendance: 2,567; Referee: Lee; Man of the Match: Dickenson

== Player statistics ==
=== Captains ===
No.	P	Name	Country	No. games	Notes
5	DF	Matty Douglas	(England)	38	Club Captain
4	MF	Reece Lyon	(Scotland)	7	Vice Captain

Last updated: 10 May 2025
Source: Competitive match reports.
Competitive matches only
Matches started as captain only
Country: FIFA nationality; No.: Squad number; P: Position; Name: Player name; No. Games: Number of games started as captain.

=== Squad ===
As of 10 May 2025

No.	Pos	Nat	Player	Total		Scottish League One		Challenge Cup		League Cup		Scottish Cup		Play-offs	
No.	Pos	Nat	Player	Apps	Goals	Apps	Goals	Apps	Goals	Apps	Goals	Apps	Goals	Apps	Goals
1	GK	(Scotland) SCO	Ross Stewart	42	0	36+0	0	0+0	0	2+0	0	2+0	0	2+0	0
2	DF	(Scotland) SCO	Michael Hewitt	35	4	27+0	4	0+0	0	4+0	0	2+0	0	2+0	0
3	DF	(Scotland) SCO	Daniel Church	1	0	0+1	0	0+0	0	0+0	0	0+0	0	0+0	0
4	MF	(Scotland) SCO	Reece Lyon	41	5	32+0	4	1+0	0	4+0	1	2+0	0	2+0	0
5	DF	(England) ENG	Matty Douglas	38	2	29+0	2	1+0	0	4+0	0	2+0	0	2+0	0
6	MF	(Scotland) SCO	Harry Cochrane	38	2	25+4	2	1+0	0	4+0	0	1+1	0	2+0	0
*7	MF	(Scotland) SCO	Kieran McKechnie	19	4	11+2	3	0+1	0	3+1	1	0+1	0	0+0	0
7	MF	(Scotland) SCO	Liam Smith	16	2	12+2	2	0+0	0	0+0	0	0+0	0	2+0	0
8	MF	(Guadeloupe) GLP	Benjamin Luissint	36	2	20+9	2	0+1	0	2+0	0	1+1	0	0+2	0
9	FW	(Scotland) SCO	Leighton McIntosh	19	1	8+7	0	1+0	0	2+0	1	1+0	0	0+0	0
10	MF	(Scotland) SCO	Kai Kennedy	30	3	20+4	2	0+1	0	1+2	0	0+0	0	2+0	1
11	MF	(England) ENG	Brennan Dickenson	28	4	19+3	2	1+0	0	4+0	1	1+0	1	0+0	0
12	FW	(Scotland) SCO	Adam Brooks	27	10	21+2	10	0+0	0	0+0	0	2+0	0	2+0	0
14	MF	(Scotland) SCO	Ben Johnstone	9	0	2+3	0	1+0	0	2+1	0	0+0	0	0+0	0
15	DF	(Scotland) SCO	Niall Rogerson	2	0	0+0	0	0+0	0	0+2	0	0+0	0	0+0	0
16	DF	(England) ENG	Jack Hannah	36	1	29+2	1	1+0	0	0+0	0	2+0	0	2+0	0
17	MF	(Scotland) SCO	Lewis O'Donnell	26	2	12+12	2	0+0	0	0+0	0	1+0	0	0+1	0
*18	MF	(Scotland) SCO	MacKenzie Strachan(T)	1	0	0+1	0	0+0	0	0+0	0	0+0	0	0+0	0
*18	MF	(England) ENG	Pharrell Willis	6	1	2+3	1	1+0	0	0+0	0	0+0	0	0+0	0
18	MF	(England) ENG	Taylor Charters	13	0	9+3	0	0+0	0	0+0	0	0+0	0	0+1	0
19	FW	(Scotland) SCO	Fraser Bryden	20	2	1+16	2	0+0	0	0+0	0	0+1	0	0+2	0
20	GK	(Scotland) SCO	Murray Johnson	1	0	0+1	0	0+0	0	0+0	0	0+0	0	0+0	0
21	MF	(Scotland) SCO	Euan Ross	6	0	2+0	0	0+0	0	2+2	0	0+0	0	0+0	0
22	DF	(Scotland) SCO	Oscar MacIntyre	44	0	30+5	0	1+0	0	3+1	0	2+0	0	2+0	0
23	MF	(Scotland) SCO	Josh Walker	27	2	7+14	1	1+0	0	2+2	1	0+1	0	0+0	0
25	FW	(Scotland) SCO	Kyle Doherty	28	2	15+8	1	0+1	0	2+0	0	1+1	1	0+0	0
28	FW	(Scotland) SCO	Zander Craik	5	0	0+1	0	0+0	0	1+3	0	0+0	0	0+0	0
29	FW	(Scotland) SCO	Jordan Allan	18	5	11+5	5	0+0	0	0+0	0	0+0	0	2+0	0
31	GK	(Scotland) SCO	Jay Hogarth	3	0	0+0	0	1+0	0	2+0	0	0+0	0	0+0	0
33	DF	(Scotland) SCO	Joe Thomson	3	0	1+2	0	0+0	0	0+0	0	0+0	0	0+0	0
35	DF	(Scotland) SCO	Jack Brydon	25	0	16+6	0	0+0	0	0+1	0	2+0	0	0+0	0

=== Disciplinary record ===
As of 10 May 2025 (UTC)

Number	Nation	Position	Name	Scottish League One		Challenge Cup		League Cup		Scottish Cup		Play-offs		Total	
Number	Nation	Position	Name	Booked	Sent off (straight red)	Booked	Sent off (straight red)	Booked	Sent off (straight red)	Booked	Sent off (straight red)	Booked	Sent off (straight red)	Booked	Sent off (straight red)
1	(Scotland)	GK	Ross Stewart	2	0	0	0	0	0	0	0	0	0	2	0
2	(Scotland)	DF	Michael Hewitt	6	0	0	0	0	0	1	0	1	0	8	0
4	(Scotland)	MF	Reece Lyon	6	0	0	0	1	0	0	0	1	0	8	0
5	(England)	DF	Matty Douglas	8	1	0	0	1	0	1	0	0	0	10	1
6	(Scotland)	MF	Harry Cochrane	7	1	1	0	1	0	0	0	0	0	9	1
7	(Scotland)	MF	Kieran McKechnie	4	0	0	0	1	0	0	0	0	0	5	0
7	(Scotland)	MF	Liam Smith	3	0	0	0	0	0	0	0	0	0	3	0
8	(Guadeloupe)	MF	Benjamin Luissint	3	0	0	0	1	0	0	0	0	0	4	0
10	(Scotland)	MF	Kai Kennedy	3	0	0	0	0	0	0	0	0	0	3	0
11	(England)	MF	Brennan Dickenson	7	0	0	0	1	0	0	0	0	0	8	0
12	(Scotland)	FW	Adam Brooks	0	0	0	0	0	0	1	0	0	0	1	0
14	(Scotland)	MF	Ben Johnstone	3	0	1	0	1	0	0	0	0	0	5	0
16	(England)	DF	Jack Hannah	4	0	0	0	0	0	0	0	0	0	4	0
17	(Scotland)	MF	Lewis O'Donnell	0	0	0	0	0	0	1	0	0	0	1	0
19	(Scotland)	FW	Fraser Bryden	1	0	0	0	0	0	0	0	0	0	1	0
22	(Scotland)	DF	Oscar MacIntyre	5	0	0	0	0	0	0	0	1	0	6	0
23	(Scotland)	MF	Josh Walker	2	0	1	0	0	0	0	0	0	0	3	0
25	(Scotland)	FW	Kyle Doherty	5	0	0	0	0	0	0	0	0	0	5	0
29	(Scotland)	FW	Jordan Allan	3	0	0	0	0	0	0	0	0	0	3	0
33	(Scotland)	DF	Joe Thomson	1	0	0	0	0	0	0	0	0	0	1	0
35	(Scotland)	DF	Jack Brydon	4	1	0	0	0	0	0	0	0	0	4	1
Totals				77	3	3	0	7	0	4	0	3	0	94	3

=== Top scorers ===
Last updated 10 May 2025

Position	Nation	Name	Scottish League One	League Cup	Challenge Cup	Scottish Cup	Play-offs	Total
1	(Scotland)	Adam Brooks	10	0	0	0	0	10
2	(Scotland)	Jordan Allan	5	0	0	0	0	5
=	(Scotland)	Reece Lyon	4	1	0	0	0	5
4	(Scotland)	Michael Hewitt	4	0	0	0	0	4
=	(Scotland)	Kieran McKechnie	3	1	0	0	0	4
=	(England)	Brennan Dickenson	2	1	0	1	0	4
7	(Scotland)	Kai Kennedy	2	0	0	0	1	3
8	(Scotland)	Josh Walker	1	1	0	0	0	2
=	(Scotland)	Kyle Doherty	1	0	0	1	0	2
=	(England)	Matty Douglas	2	0	0	0	0	2
=	(Scotland)	Lewis O'Donnell	2	0	0	0	0	2
=	(Scotland)	Liam Smith	2	0	0	0	0	2
=	(Guadeloupe)	Benjamin Luissint	2	0	0	0	0	2
=	(Scotland)	Harry Cochrane	2	0	0	0	0	2
=	(Scotland)	Fraser Bryden	2	0	0	0	0	2
16	(Scotland)	Leighton McIntosh	0	1	0	0	0	1
=	(England)	Pharrell Willis	1	0	0	0	0	1
=	(England)	Jack Hannah	1	0	0	0	0	1

=== Clean sheets ===
R	Pos	Nat	Name	Scottish League One	League Cup	Challenge Cup	Scottish Cup	Play-offs	Total
1	GK	(Scotland)	Ross Stewart	10	0	0	1	1	12
31	GK	(Scotland)	Jay Hogarth	0	1	0	0	0	1
Total				10	1	0	1	1	13

Last updated: 10 May 2025

== Team statistics ==
=== Scottish League One ===
==== League table ====
Pos	Team	Pld	W	D	L	GF	GA	GD	Pts	Promotion, qualification or relegation
1	Arbroath (C, P)	36	19	7	10	58	42	+16	64	Promotion to the Championship
2	Cove Rangers	36	16	9	11	62	44	+18	57	Qualification for the Championship play-offs
3	Queen of the South	36	16	7	13	46	41	+5	55	Qualification for the Championship play-offs
4	Stenhousemuir	36	15	8	13	48	45	+3	53	Qualification for the Championship play-offs
5	Alloa Athletic	36	13	12	11	55	47	+8	51	

Rules for classification: 1) Points; 2) Goal difference; 3) Goals scored; 4) Head-to-to head points; 5) Head-to-head goal difference; 6) Play-off (only for deciding promotion, play-off participation and relegation).
(C) Champions; (P) Promoted

==== Results by round ====
Round	1	2	3	4	5	6	7	8	9	10	11	12	13	14	15	16	17	18	19	20	21	22	23	24	25	26	27	28	29	30	31	32	33	34	35	36
Ground	A	H	H	A	A	H	A	H	H	A	A	H	H	A	A	H	A	H	H	A	H	H	A	A	H	A	H	A	H	A	H	A	H	A	H	A
Result	D	W	W	L	L	W	D	W	L	L	L	W	D	L	L	W	L	D	W	D	W	W	L	L	L	W	L	L	W	D	W	W	W	W	W	D
Position	8	3	2	3	4	2	3	1	4	6	7	5	6	6	7	7	7	7	6	6	5	3	4	4	5	5	5	6	5	5	4	4	4	3	3	3

Updated to match(es) played on 3 May 2025. Source:
A = Away; H = Home; W = Win; D = Draw; L = Loss

=== League Cup table ===
Pos	Team	Pld	W	PW	PL	L	GF	GA	GD	Pts	Qualification	ABE	AIR	QOS	EKB	DUM
1	Aberdeen	4	4	0	0	0	15	1	+14	12	Qualification for the second round	—	2–1	—	—	6–0
2	Airdrieonians	4	3	0	0	1	15	5	+10	9	Qualification for the second round	—	—	2–0	8–0	—
3	Queen of the South	4	2	0	0	2	5	6	−1	6		0–3	—	—	—	2–0
4	East Kilbride	4	0	1	0	3	2	16	−14	2		0–4	—	1–3	—	—
5	Dumbarton	4	0	0	1	3	4	13	−9	1		—	3–4	—	1–1p	—

Rules for classification: 1) goal difference, 2) goals scored, 3) away goals scored, 4) matches won, 5) away matches won, 6) drawing of lots.

=== Management statistics ===
Last updated 10 May 2025

Name	From	To	P	W	D	L	Win% (Note: Win% is the percentage of matches won rounded to two decimal places.)
Peter Murphy	13 July 2024	10 May 2025	45	19	8	18	42.22

== Transfers ==
=== Players in ===
Player	From	Fee
(Scotland) Jack Brydon	(Scotland) Queen of the South	Free
(Scotland) Daniel Church	(Scotland) Queen of the South	Free
(Scotland) Harry Cochrane	(Scotland) Queen of the South	Free
(Scotland) Kyle Doherty	(Scotland) Queen of the South	Free
(England) Jake Hutchinson	(Scotland) Queen of the South	Free
(Scotland) Kieran McKechnie	(Scotland) Queen of the South	Free
(Scotland) Ben Johnstone	(Scotland) Queen of the South	Free
(Scotland) Charlie Cowie	(Scotland) Queen of the South	Free
(England) Matty Douglas	(Scotland) Annan Athletic	Free
(Guadeloupe) Benjamin Luissint	(Scotland) Annan Athletic	Free
(Scotland) Reece Lyon	(Scotland) Kelty Hearts	Free
(Scotland) Niall Rogerson	(Scotland) Queen of the South	Free
(England) Brennan Dickenson	(England) Oldham Athletic	Free
(Scotland) Ross Stewart	(Scotland) Partick Thistle	Free
(Scotland) Leighton McIntosh	(Scotland) Arbroath	Free
(Scotland) Kai Kennedy	(England) York City	Free
(Scotland) Oscar MacIntyre	(Scotland) Hibernian	Loan
(Scotland) Jay Hogarth	(Scotland) Rangers	Loan
(Scotland) Josh Walker	(Scotland) Stranraer	Free
(Scotland) Michael Hewitt	(Scotland) Hamilton Academical	Free
(Scotland) Zander Craik	(Scotland) Kilmarnock	Loan
(England) Jack Hannah	(England) Middlesbrough	Loan
(Scotland) Lewis O'Donnell	(Scotland) Dundee United	Loan
(Scotland) Fraser Bryden	(Scotland) Ayr United	Loan
(England) Pharrell Willis	(England) Middlesbrough	Loan
(Scotland) Adam Brooks	(Scotland) Inverness Caledonian Thistle	Free
(Scotland) Jordan Allan	(Scotland) Falkirk	Loan
(Scotland) Liam Smith	(Wales) Swansea City	Undisclosed
(England) Taylor Charters	(England) Carlisle United	Loan
(Scotland) Murray Johnson	(Scotland) Hibernian	Loan

=== Players out ===
Player	To	Fee
(Scotland) Gavin Reilly	(Scotland) Arbroath	Free
(Scotland) Jordan Houston	(Scotland) Clyde	Free
(Scotland) Paul McKay	(Scotland) Clyde	Free
(Nigeria) Efe Ambrose	Free Agent	Free
(Switzerland) Gordon Botterill	Free Agent	Free
(Scotland) Cammy Logan	Free Agent	Free
(England) Harvey Walker	Free Agent	Free
(Scotland) Harry Stone	(Scotland) Heart of Midlothian	Loan
(Scotland) Kyle McClelland	(Scotland) Hibernian	Loan
(Scotland) Alex Ferguson	(Scotland) St Johnstone	Loan
(Sweden) Joel Mumbongo	(Scotland) Hamilton Academical	Loan
(England) Max Kilsby	(Scotland) Carlisle United	Loan
(Scotland) Oscar MacIntyre	(Scotland) Hibernian	Loan
(Scotland) Murray Johnson	(Scotland) Hibernian	Loan
(Scotland) Jay Burns	Free Agent	Free
(Scotland) Finlay Kennedy	Free Agent	Free
(Scotland) Craig McGuffie	(Scotland) Dumbarton	Free
(Scotland) Lewis Gibson	(Scotland) Raith Rovers	Undisclosed
(England) Jake Hutchinson	(England) Worthing	Undisclosed
(Scotland) Reegan Mimnaugh	(Scotland) East Kilbride	Free
(Scotland) Lee Connelly	(Scotland) Clyde	Free
(Scotland) Charlie Cowie	(Scotland) Gartcairn Juniors	Undisclosed
(Scotland) Euan Ross	(Scotland) Cumbernauld Colts	Loan
(Scotland) Zander Craik	(Scotland) Kilmarnock	Loan
(England) Pharrell Willis	(England) Middlesbrough	Loan
(Scotland) Kieran McKechnie	Free Agent	Free
(Scotland) Ben Johnstone	(Scotland) Cumbernauld Colts	Loan
(Scotland) Niall Rogerson	(Scotland) Threave Rovers	Loan
(Scotland) Leighton McIntosh	Free Agent	Free

== See also ==
- List of Queen of the South F.C. seasons
