= 2024–25 Scottish League Cup group stage =

2024–25 Scottish League Cup (group stage)
Tournament details
- Country: Scotland
- Dates: 13 July 2024 – 28 July 2024
- Teams: 40

Tournament statistics
- Matches played: 80
- Goals scored: 269 (3.36 per match)
- Top goal scorer: Ben Wilson (6 goals)

The 2024–25 Scottish League Cup group stage was played from 13 July to 28 July 2024. A total of 40 teams competed in the group stage. The winners of each of the eight groups as well as the three best runners-up progressed to the second round (last 16) of the 2024–25 Scottish League Cup.

== Format ==
The competition begins with eight groups of five teams; each team plays one match only against each other team in the group, either home or away, for a total of two home and two away matches. The five clubs initially competing in the UEFA Champions League (Celtic and Rangers), Europa League (Heart of Midlothian and Kilmarnock) and Conference League (St Mirren) receive a bye to the second round. The group stage consists of 40 teams: all remaining teams that competed across the SPFL in 2023–24, the 2023–24 Highland Football League champions (Buckie Thistle) and runners-up (Brechin City), and the 2023–24 Lowland Football League champions (East Kilbride).

The winners of each of the eight groups, as well as the three best runners-up, progress to the second round (last 16). At this stage, the competition reverts to the traditional knock-out format. The three group winners with the highest points total and the European entrants are seeded.

The traditional point system of awarding three points for a win and one point for a draw is used. In addition, for each group stage match that finishes in a draw, a penalty shoot-out takes place, with the winner being awarded a bonus point.

The draw for the group stage took place on 29 May 2024 and was broadcast live on the Premier Sports and SPFL YouTube channels.

== Teams ==
The teams are seeded according to their final league positions in 2023–24 and drawn into eight groups, with each group comprising one team from each pot.

=== Seeding ===
Teams in Bold qualified for the second round.

Pot 1	Pot 2	Pot 3	Pot 4	Pot 5
01. **Dundee**; 02. **Aberdeen**; 03. **Hibernian**; 04. **Motherwell**; 05. **St Johnstone**; 06. **Ross County**; 07. Livingston; 08. **Dundee United**	09. Raith Rovers; 10. Partick Thistle; 11. **Airdrieonians**; 12. Greenock Morton; 13. Dunfermline Athletic; 14. Ayr United; 15. **Queen's Park**; 16. Inverness Caledonian Thistle	17. Arbroath; 18. **Falkirk**; 19. Hamilton Academical; 20. Alloa Athletic; 21. Montrose; 22. Cove Rangers; 23. Kelty Hearts; 24. Queen of the South	25. Annan Athletic; 26. Stirling Albion; 27. Edinburgh City; 28. Stenhousemuir; 29. Peterhead; 30. **The Spartans**; 31. Dumbarton; 32. East Fife	33. Forfar Athletic; 34. Elgin City; 35. Bonnyrigg Rose; 36. Clyde; 37. Stranraer; 38. East Kilbride; 39. Buckie Thistle; 40. Brechin City

== Group stage ==
All times are BST (UTC +1).

=== Group A ===
Pos	Team	Pld	W	PW	PL	L	GF	GA	GD	Pts	Qualification	ABE	AIR	QOS	EKB	DUM
1	Aberdeen	4	4	0	0	0	15	1	+14	12	Qualification for the second round	—	2–1	—	—	6–0
2	Airdrieonians	4	3	0	0	1	15	5	+10	9	Qualification for the second round	—	—	2–0	8–0	—
3	Queen of the South	4	2	0	0	2	5	6	−1	6		0–3	—	—	—	2–0
4	East Kilbride	4	0	1	0	3	2	16	−14	2		0–4	—	1–3	—	—
5	Dumbarton	4	0	0	1	3	4	13	−9	1		—	3–4	—	1–1p	—

Rules for classification: 1) goal difference, 2) goals scored, 3) away goals scored, 4) matches won, 5) away matches won, 6) drawing of lots.

==== Matches ====
13 July 2024
15:00

Dumbarton	1–1	East Kilbride
Orsi 16'		Wilson 7' (o.g.)
Penalties
Wallace (penalty missed); Ruth (penalty scored); Hilton (penalty scored); Orsi (penalty missed)	2–4	(penalty scored) McDonald; (penalty scored) Spence; (penalty missed) Daramola; (penalty scored) Robertson; (penalty scored) Wilson

Dumbarton Football Stadium, Dumbarton
Attendance: 370
Referee: Joel Kennedy
13 July 2024
17:15

Queen of the South	0–3	Aberdeen
		Sokler 6', 37'; Shinnie 23'

Palmerston Park, Dumfries
Attendance: 2,274
Referee: Don Robertson
16 July 2024
19:45

Airdrieonians	8–0	East Kilbride
Wilson 2' (pen.), 20', 34'; McGregor 9', 52', 53'; Armstrong 32'; Hancock 37'

Excelsior Stadium, Airdrie
Attendance: 978
Referee: George Calder
16 July 2024
19:45

Queen of the South	2–0	Dumbarton
McIntosh 7'; McKechnie 58'

Palmerston Park, Dumfries
Attendance: 778
Referee: Stewart Luke
20 July 2024
15:00

Dumbarton	3–4	Airdrieonians
Gray 27'; Hilton 47', 51' (pen.)		McGrattan 35'; Armstrong 69'; Agyemang 84'; Wilson 88'

Dumbarton Football Stadium, Dumbarton
Attendance: 659
Referee: Lloyd Wilson
20 July 2024
15:00

East Kilbride	0–4	Aberdeen
		Devlin 27'; McGrath 35'; Clarkson 54'; Morris 62'

K-Park Training Academy, East Kilbride
Attendance: 686
Referee: Grant Irvine
23 July 2024
19:45

Aberdeen	2–1	Airdrieonians
Shinnie 49'; Clarkson 59'		Wilson 40'

Pittodrie Stadium, Aberdeen
Attendance: 9,161
Referee: Chris Graham
23 July 2024
19:45

East Kilbride	1–3	Queen of the South
Fagan 33'		Walker 41'; Lyon 42'; Dickenson 45+3'

K-Park Training Academy, East Kilbride
Attendance: 398
Referee: Alastair Grieve
27 July 2024
15:00

Aberdeen	6–0	Dumbarton
MacKenzie 46'; Sokler 48', 61'; Ambrose 84'; McGarry 86'; Rubežić 90+2'

Pittodrie Stadium, Aberdeen
Attendance: 8,450
Referee: Craig Napier
27 July 2024
15:00

Airdrieonians	2–0	Queen of the South
Wilson 44'; Agyemang 64'

Excelsior Stadium, Airdrie
Attendance: 1,156
Referee: Gavin Duncan

=== Group B ===
Pos	Team	Pld	W	PW	PL	L	GF	GA	GD	Pts	Qualification	FAL	DUN	AYR	STE	BUC
1	Falkirk	4	3	0	0	1	11	2	+9	9	Qualification for the second round	—	2–0	—	4–0	—
2	Dundee United	4	3	0	0	1	10	5	+5	9	Qualification for the second round	—	—	2–1	3–0	—
3	Ayr United	4	3	0	0	1	9	5	+4	9		1–0	—	—	—	3–2
4	Stenhousemuir	4	1	0	0	3	5	11	−6	3		—	—	1–4	—	4–0
5	Buckie Thistle	4	0	0	0	4	5	17	−12	0		1–5	2–5	—	—	—

Rules for classification: 1) goal difference, 2) goals scored, 3) away goals scored, 4) matches won, 5) away matches won, 6) drawing of lots.

==== Matches ====
13 July 2024
15:00

Falkirk	2–0	Dundee United
Tait 62'; MacIver 71'

Falkirk Stadium, Falkirk
Attendance: 3,305
Referee: Iain Snedden
13 July 2024
15:00

Stenhousemuir	4–0	Buckie Thistle
Aitken 19'; Taylor 41'; Anderson 59', 69'

Ochilview Park, Stenhousemuir
Attendance: 254
Referee: Alastair Grieve
16 July 2024
19:45

Ayr United	1–0	Falkirk
Dowds 5'

Somerset Park, Ayr
Attendance: 1,900
Referee: Calum Scott
16 July 2024
19:45

Dundee United	3–0	Stenhousemuir
Moult 25'; Gallagher 34'; Trapanovski 47'

Tannadice Park, Dundee
Attendance: 1,966
Referee: Don Robertson
20 July 2024
15:00

Buckie Thistle	1–5	Falkirk
MacAskill 30'		Fyffe 24' (o.g.); Nesbitt 32', 88'; Mackie 34'; Shanley 90+4'

Victoria Park, Buckie
Attendance: 1,023
Referee: Greg Soutar
20 July 2024
17:15

Dundee United	2–1	Ayr United
Babunski 17'; Forbes 68'		Rus 55'

Tannadice Park, Dundee
Attendance: 2,157
Referee: Kevin Clancy
23 July 2024
19:45

Stenhousemuir	1–4	Ayr United
Taylor 6'		Oakley 8'; Musonda 26'; Dowds 56'; Henderson 65'

Ochilview Park, Stenhousemuir
Attendance: 629
Referee: Gavin Duncan
23 July 2024
20:00

Buckie Thistle	2–5	Dundee United
McCabe 48'; MacIver 67' (pen.)		Trapanovski 19', 53'; Holt 32' (pen.), 77' (pen.); Babunski 61'

Victoria Park, Buckie
Attendance: 1,220
Referee: Calum Scott
27 July 2024
15:00

Ayr United	3–2	Buckie Thistle
Henderson 30', 43'; Hastie 67'		Peters 45'; McLeod 57'

Somerset Park, Ayr
Attendance: 1,415
Referee: Colin Steven
27 July 2024
15:00

Falkirk	4–0	Stenhousemuir
Morrison 25' (pen.); MacIver 31', 46'; Henderson 68'

Falkirk Stadium, Falkirk
Attendance: 2,964
Referee: Lloyd Wilson

=== Group C ===
Pos	Team	Pld	W	PW	PL	L	GF	GA	GD	Pts	Qualification	HIB	QPA	PET	KEL	ELG
1	Hibernian	4	3	0	0	1	14	2	+12	9	Qualification for the second round	—	5–1	4–0	—	—
2	Queen's Park	4	3	0	0	1	16	5	+11	9	Qualification for the second round	—	—	—	6–0	4–0
3	Peterhead	4	2	0	0	2	5	11	−6	6		—	0–5	—	—	4–2
4	Kelty Hearts	4	1	0	1	2	2	8	−6	4		1–0	—	0–1	—	—
5	Elgin City	4	0	1	0	3	3	14	−11	2		0–5	—	—	p1–1	—

Rules for classification: 1) goal difference, 2) goals scored, 3) away goals scored, 4) matches won, 5) away matches won, 6) drawing of lots.

==== Matches ====
13 July 2024
15:00

Elgin City	0–5	Hibernian
		Vente 8', 44', 58'; Ekpiteta 51'; Boyle 54'

Borough Briggs, Elgin
Attendance: 1,788
Referee: Colin Steven
13 July 2024
15:00

Peterhead	0–5	Queen's Park
		Rudden 30'; MacGregor 60'; Mauchin 80'; McLeish 85'; Brown 90+2' (o.g.)

Balmoor Stadium, Peterhead
Attendance: 548
Referee: Duncan Nicolson
16 July 2024
19:45

Elgin City	1–1	Kelty Hearts
Dangana 70'		Williamson 45+1'
Penalties
Dingwall (penalty scored); Draper (penalty scored); Murray (penalty scored); Cameron (penalty scored); Golding (penalty scored)	5–4	(penalty scored) Moore; (penalty missed) Allan; (penalty scored) Cunningham; (penalty scored) Brown; (penalty scored) Williamson

Borough Briggs, Elgin
Attendance: 473
Referee: Dan McFarlane
16 July 2024
19:45

Hibernian	5–1	Queen's Park
O'Hora 15'; Boyle 19', 77'; Molotnikov 45+2'; Levitt 72'		Turner 90+6'

Easter Road, Edinburgh
Attendance: 4,795
Referee: Ross Hardie
20 July 2024
15:00

Kelty Hearts	1–0	Hibernian
Flatman 58'

New Central Park, Kelty
Attendance: 1,813
Referee: Chris Graham
20 July 2024
15:00

Peterhead	4–2	Elgin City
Armour 25'; Goldie 71'; Jas. Brown 79', 84'		Murray 62'; Golding 67' (pen.)

Balmoor Stadium, Peterhead
Attendance: 623
Referee: Andy Gamble
23 July 2024
19:45

Kelty Hearts	0–1	Peterhead
		Barry 27'

New Central Park, Kelty
Attendance: 346
Referee: Ryan Lee
23 July 2024
19:45

Queen's Park	4–0	Elgin City
MacGregor 40', 44'; Thomas 51'; Scott 71'

Lesser Hampden, Glasgow
Attendance: 478
Referee: Lloyd Wilson
27 July 2024
15:00

Hibernian	4–0	Peterhead
Miller 5', 50'; Molotnikov 59'; Moriah-Welsh 71'

Easter Road, Edinburgh
Attendance: 4,670
Referee: Euan Anderson
27 July 2024
15:00

Queen's Park	6–0	Kelty Hearts
Thomas 11'; Welsh 32'; MacGregor 42', 61'; Turner 57', 90'

Lesser Hampden, Glasgow
Attendance: 665
Referee: Matthew MacDermid

=== Group D ===
Pos	Team	Pld	W	PW	PL	L	GF	GA	GD	Pts	Qualification	DND	ANN	ARB	ICT	BON
1	Dundee	4	4	0	0	0	18	2	+16	12	Qualification for the second round	—	3–1	—	6–0	—
2	Annan Athletic	4	2	0	1	1	7	5	+2	7		—	—	—	1–0	2–2p
3	Arbroath	4	1	1	0	2	1	5	−4	5		0–2	0–3	—	—	—
4	Inverness Caledonian Thistle	4	1	0	1	2	3	7	−4	4		—	—	0–0p	—	3–0
5	Bonnyrigg Rose	4	0	1	0	3	3	13	−10	2		1–7	—	0–1	—	—

Rules for classification: 1) goal difference, 2) goals scored, 3) away goals scored, 4) matches won, 5) away matches won, 6) drawing of lots.

==== Matches ====
13 July 2024
15:00

Annan Athletic	1–0	Inverness Caledonian Thistle
Goss 21'

Galabank, Annan
Attendance: 427
Referee: Jordan Curran
13 July 2024
15:00

Bonnyrigg Rose	1–7	Dundee
Osadolor 75'		Main 12', 31', 79'; Portales 15'; Cameron 17', 63'; Astley 52'

New Dundas Park, Bonnyrigg
Attendance: 987
Referee: Dan McFarlane
16 July 2024
19:45

Annan Athletic	2–2	Bonnyrigg Rose
McGowan 13'; Smith 31'		Barrett 7'; Rodden 87'
Penalties
Goss (penalty scored); Smith (penalty scored); Todd (penalty missed); Kilsby (penalty scored); Dixon (penalty missed); T. Muir (penalty scored); Quigg (penalty scored); Fleming (penalty scored); R. Muir (penalty missed)	6–7	(penalty scored) Martyniuk; (penalty missed) Currie; (penalty scored) Rodden; (penalty scored) Higginbotham; (penalty missed) Arnott; (penalty scored) Grigor; (penalty scored) Waddell; (penalty scored) Somerville; (penalty scored) Scarborough

Galabank, Annan
Attendance: 429
Referee: Alastair Grieve
16 July 2024
19:45

Arbroath	0–2	Dundee
		McCowan 51' (pen.); Ingram 79'

Gayfield Park, Arbroath
Attendance: 1,796
Referee: Chris Graham
20 July 2024
15:00

Arbroath	0–3	Annan Athletic
		Todd 28', 90+3'; Dixon 60'

Gayfield Park, Arbroath
Attendance: 559
Referee: Duncan Nicolson
20 July 2024
15:00

Inverness Caledonian Thistle	3–0	Bonnyrigg Rose
Brooks 9'; Bray 17'; Longstaff 43'

Caledonian Stadium, Inverness
Attendance: 682
Referee: Ryan Lee
23 July 2024
19:45

Dundee	3–1	Annan Athletic
Murray 34', 85'; Palmer-Houlden 90+1'		Goss 40'

Glebe Park, Brechin
Attendance: 888
Referee: Iain Snedden
23 July 2024
19:45

Inverness Caledonian Thistle	0–0	Arbroath
Penalties
Mckay (penalty scored); Longstaff (penalty missed); Savage (penalty scored); Gilmour (penalty scored)	3–5	(penalty scored) Murray; (penalty scored) Callaghan; (penalty scored) Stowe; (penalty scored) Wilkie; (penalty scored) Bisland

Caledonian Stadium, Inverness
Attendance: 754
Referee: Stewart Luke
27 July 2024
15:00

Bonnyrigg Rose	0–1	Arbroath
		Reilly 87'

New Dundas Park, Bonnyrigg
Attendance: 622
Referee: Jordan Curran
27 July 2024
15:00

Dundee	6–0	Inverness Caledonian Thistle
Murray 1', 18', 29'; Palmer-Houlden 23', 39'; Portales 79'

Glebe Park, Brechin
Attendance: 1,057
Referee: John Beaton

=== Group E ===
Pos	Team	Pld	W	PW	PL	L	GF	GA	GD	Pts	Qualification	SPA	LIV	FOR	DNF	COV
1	The Spartans	4	3	0	0	1	7	3	+4	9	Qualification for the second round	—	—	1–0	0–3	—
2	Livingston	4	3	0	0	1	5	1	+4	9		0–1	—	—	1–0	—
3	Forfar Athletic	4	2	0	0	2	5	3	+2	6		—	0–2	—	—	3–0 (Note: Forfar Athletic were awarded a technical 3−0 win over Cove, who fielded an ineligible player. The match had originally finished 1–1, with Forfar securing the bonus point following a 3–1 win on penalties.)
4	Dunfermline Athletic	4	1	0	0	3	4	5	−1	3		—	—	0–2	—	1–2
5	Cove Rangers	4	1	0	0	3	2	11	−9	3		0–5	0–2	—	—	—

Rules for classification: 1) goal difference, 2) goals scored, 3) away goals scored, 4) matches won, 5) away matches won, 6) drawing of lots.

==== Matches ====
13 July 2024
15:00

Forfar Athletic	0–2	Livingston
		Sole 49'; Muirhead 88'

Station Park, Forfar
Attendance: 538
Referee: Stewart Luke
13 July 2024
15:00

The Spartans	0–3	Dunfermline Athletic
		McCann 4'; Ritchie-Hosler 82'; Sutherland 87'

Ainslie Park, Edinburgh
Attendance: 856
Referee: Peter Stuart
16 July 2024
19:45

Cove Rangers	0–5	The Spartans
		Henderson 17' (pen.); Gillingham 29' (o.g.); Dishington 53'; Russell 73', 82'

Balmoral Stadium, Aberdeen
Attendance: 275
Referee: Duncan Nicolson
16 July 2024
19:45

Dunfermline Athletic	0–2	Forfar Athletic
		MacLean 28'; Whatley 52'

East End Park, Dunfermline
Attendance: 1,358
Referee: Colin Whyte
20 July 2024
15:00

Forfar Athletic	3–0 (awarded)	Cove Rangers
Malcolm 21'		Scully 31'
Penalties
Skelly (penalty missed); Allan (penalty scored); Taylor (penalty scored); Cannon (penalty scored)	3–1	(penalty missed) Fyvie; (penalty scored) Glass; (penalty missed) Kerr; (penalty missed) Gallagher

Station Park, Forfar
Attendance: 458
Referee: George Calder
20 July 2024
15:00

Livingston	1–0	Dunfermline Athletic
Muirhead 11'

Almondvale Stadium, Livingston
Attendance: 1,555
Referee: Colin Steven
23 July 2024
19:45

Cove Rangers	0–2	Livingston
		Murray 6' (o.g.); Sole 86'

Balmoral Stadium, Aberdeen
Attendance: 243
Referee: Euan Anderson
23 July 2024
19:45

The Spartans	1–0	Forfar Athletic
Henderson 86'

Ainslie Park, Edinburgh
Attendance: 257
Referee: Gary Hanvidge
27 July 2024
15:00

Dunfermline Athletic	1–2	Cove Rangers
Sutherland 88'		Doyle 58'; Gaffney 84'

East End Park, Dunfermline
Attendance: 1,011
Referee: Calum Scott
27 July 2024
15:00

Livingston	0–1	The Spartans
		Russell 85'

Almondvale Stadium, Livingston
Attendance: 848
Referee: George Calder

Notes

1. A: Forfar Athletic were awarded a technical 3−0 win over Cove Rangers, who fielded an ineligible player. The match had originally finished 1–1, with Forfar securing the bonus point following a 3–1 win on penalties.

=== Group F ===
Pos	Team	Pld	W	PW	PL	L	GF	GA	GD	Pts	Qualification	STJ	ALL	EFI	GMO	BRE
1	St Johnstone	4	3	0	0	1	11	5	+6	9	Qualification for the second round	—	—	5–1	2–0	—
2	Alloa Athletic	4	2	1	0	1	7	5	+2	8		3–2	—	p0–0	—	—
3	East Fife	4	2	0	1	1	8	5	+3	7		—	—	—	3–0	4–0
4	Greenock Morton	4	2	0	0	2	3	6	−3	6		—	2–1	—	—	1–0
5	Brechin City	4	0	0	0	4	2	10	−8	0		1–2	1–3	—	—	—

Rules for classification: 1) goal difference, 2) goals scored, 3) away goals scored, 4) matches won, 5) away matches won, 6) drawing of lots.

==== Matches ====
13 July 2024
15:00

Brechin City	1–2	St Johnstone
Moreland 90+1'		Carey 45+2' (pen.); Cameron 65'

Glebe Park, Brechin
Attendance: 1,075
Referee: Craig Napier
13 July 2024
15:00

East Fife	3–0	Greenock Morton
Trouten 17', 22' (pen.), 54'

Bayview Stadium, Methil
Attendance: 662
Referee: Colin Whyte
16 July 2024
19:45

Alloa Athletic	0–0	East Fife
Penalties
Taggart (penalty scored); Donnelly (penalty scored); Sammon (penalty scored); Roberts (penalty scored); Waters (penalty scored)	5–3	(penalty missed) Munro; (penalty scored) Shepherd; (penalty scored) Murdoch; (penalty scored) McManus

Recreation Park, Alloa
Attendance: 442
Referee: Iain Snedden
16 July 2024
19:45

Greenock Morton	1–0	Brechin City
Ballantyne 58'

Cappielow, Greenock
Attendance: 834
Referee: Euan Anderson
20 July 2024
15:00

Brechin City	1–3	Alloa Athletic
Scott 84'		Taggart 17' (pen.); Cawley 66'; Rankin 75'

Glebe Park, Brechin
Attendance: 274
Referee: Colin Whyte
20 July 2024
15:00

St Johnstone	2–0	Greenock Morton
Mbunga Kimpioka 12', 44'

McDiarmid Park, Perth
Attendance: 2,403
Referee: Iain Snedden
23 July 2024
19:45

Alloa Athletic	3–2	St Johnstone
Neill 54'; Rankin 83', 88'		Mbunga Kimpioka 55'; Sanders 90'

Recreation Park, Alloa
Attendance: 1,112
Referee: Colin Steven
23 July 2024
19:45

East Fife	4–0	Brechin City
Newton 15'; Austin 23', 46'; Shepherd 40'

Bayview Stadium, Methil
Attendance: 558
Referee: Daniel Graves
27 July 2024
15:00

Greenock Morton	2–1	Alloa Athletic
Moffatt 31'; Garrity 58'		Sammon 70'

Cappielow, Greenock
Attendance: 823
Referee: Ross Hardie
27 July 2024
15:00

St Johnstone	5–1	East Fife
Sidibeh 15', 44'; Mbunga Kimpioka 28', 90+1'; Kirk 88'		Trouten 64'

McDiarmid Park, Perth
Attendance: 2,424
Referee: Don Robertson

=== Group G ===
Pos	Team	Pld	W	PW	PL	L	GF	GA	GD	Pts	Qualification	MOT	PAR	MON	CLY	EDI
1	Motherwell	4	2	1	1	0	7	2	+5	9	Qualification for the second round	—	0–0p	—	—	3–0
2	Partick Thistle	4	2	1	0	1	11	5	+6	8		—	—	3–2	2–3	—
3	Montrose	4	2	0	1	1	6	5	+1	7		1–1p	—	—	—	2–1
4	Clyde	4	2	0	0	2	9	6	+3	6		1–3	—	0–1	—	—
5	Edinburgh City	4	0	0	0	4	1	16	−15	0		—	0–6	—	0–5	—

Rules for classification: 1) goal difference, 2) goals scored, 3) away goals scored, 4) matches won, 5) away matches won, 6) drawing of lots.

==== Matches ====
13 July 2024
15:00

Motherwell	3–0	Edinburgh City
Balmer 43'; Casey 56'; O'Donnell 61'

Fir Park, Motherwell
Attendance: 2,587
Referee: Calum Scott
13 July 2024
15:00

Partick Thistle	3–2	Montrose
Muirhead 43'; Turner 47'; Graham 75'		Maciver-Redwood 37'; Hermiston 64'

Firhill Stadium, Glasgow
Attendance: 1,923
Referee: Matthew MacDermid
16 July 2024
19:45

Montrose	1–1	Motherwell
Shrive 86'		Blaney 31'
Penalties
Gardyne (penalty scored); Shrive (penalty scored); Machado (penalty missed); Maciver-Redwood (penalty scored); Brown (penalty scored)	4–5	(penalty scored) Stuparević; (penalty scored) Blaney; (penalty scored) Miller; (penalty scored) O'Donnell; (penalty scored) Ebiye

Links Park, Montrose
Attendance: 1,036
Referee: Colin Steven
17 July 2024
19:45

Edinburgh City	0–5	Clyde
		Connell 22'; Rennie 55'; Redfern 58'; Connelly 75'; Dunachie 77'

Meadowbank Stadium, Edinburgh
Attendance: 307
Referee: Sean Murdoch
20 July 2024
15:00

Clyde	1–3	Motherwell
Hamilton 62'		Ebiye 12'; Miller 65' (pen.); Stuparević 86'

New Douglas Park, Hamilton
Attendance: 1,948
Referee: Craig Napier
20 July 2024
15:00

Edinburgh City	0–6	Partick Thistle
		Robinson 57'; Graham 69'; Milne 75'; Diack 78'; Williams 85'; Turner 90+1'

Meadowbank Stadium, Edinburgh
Attendance: 746
Referee: Ross Hardie
23 July 2024
19:45

Montrose	2–1	Edinburgh City
Smith 7'; Lyons 65'		Lawson 29'

Links Park, Montrose
Attendance: 414
Referee: Peter Stuart
23 July 2024
19:45

Partick Thistle	2–3	Clyde
Fitzpatrick 5'; Graham 61'		Ashcroft 27' (o.g.); Dunachie 44', 86'

Firhill Stadium, Glasgow
Attendance: 2,848
Referee: John Beaton
27 July 2024
15:00

Clyde	0–1	Montrose
		Brown 5'

New Douglas Park, Hamilton
Attendance: 525
Referee: Alex Shepherd
28 July 2024
15:00

Motherwell	0–0	Partick Thistle
Penalties
Seddon (penalty missed); O'Donnell (penalty missed); Ebiye (penalty scored); Wells (penalty missed)	1–3	(penalty missed) Muirhead; (penalty scored) Turner; (penalty scored) Graham; (penalty missed) Stanway; (penalty scored) McBeth

Fir Park, Motherwell
Attendance: 5,695
Referee: David Dickinson

=== Group H ===
Pos	Team	Pld	W	PW	PL	L	GF	GA	GD	Pts	Qualification	ROS	RAI	HAM	STI	STR
1	Ross County	4	4	0	0	0	10	3	+7	12	Qualification for the second round	—	2–1	—	3–0	—
2	Raith Rovers	4	2	1	0	1	7	4	+3	8		—	—	p1–1	—	2–1
3	Hamilton Academical	4	1	0	2	1	5	3	+2	5		1–2	—	—	0–0p	—
4	Stirling Albion	4	0	2	0	2	2	8	−6	4		—	0–3	—	—	p2–2
5	Stranraer	4	0	0	1	3	4	10	−6	1		1–3	—	0–3	—	—

Rules for classification: 1) goal difference, 2) goals scored, 3) away goals scored, 4) matches won, 5) away matches won, 6) drawing of lots.

==== Matches ====
13 July 2024
15:00

Stirling Albion	0–3	Raith Rovers
		Connolly 17', 25', 66'

Forthbank Stadium, Stirling
Attendance: 1,202
Referee: Greg Soutar
13 July 2024
15:00

Stranraer	1–3	Ross County
Lang 81'		White 6', 32'; Brophy 83'

Stair Park, Stranraer
Attendance: 515
Referee: Lloyd Wilson
16 July 2024
19:45

Hamilton Academical	0–0	Stirling Albion
Penalties
McGowan (penalty missed); O'Hara (penalty missed); Murray (penalty scored); MacDonald (penalty scored)	2–4	(penalty scored) Wright; (penalty scored) Weir; (penalty scored) McKinley; (penalty missed) Crane; (penalty scored) Featherstone

New Douglas Park, Hamilton
Attendance: 668
Referee: Lloyd Wilson
16 July 2024
19:45

Raith Rovers	2–1	Stranraer
Hamilton 5'; Murray 90'		Dunlop 84'

Stark's Park, Kirkcaldy
Attendance: 1,435
Referee: Grant Irvine
20 July 2024
15:00

Ross County	2–1	Raith Rovers
White 29'; Harmon 87'		Smith 50'

Victoria Park, Dingwall
Attendance: 1,228
Referee: Euan Anderson
20 July 2024
15:00

Stranraer	0–3	Hamilton Academical
		Bradley 35'; Kyle MacDonald 55'; Henderson 87'

Stair Park, Stranraer
Attendance: 438
Referee: Peter Stuart
23 July 2024
19:45

Hamilton Academical	1–2	Ross County
Shaw 11'		Hale 25'; White 28'

New Douglas Park, Hamilton
Attendance: 561
Referee: Matthew MacDermid
23 July 2024
19:45

Stirling Albion	2–2	Stranraer
McKinlay 25'; Roy 78'		Edgar 83'; Lang 85'
Penalties
Wright (penalty scored); Carrick (penalty scored); Roy (penalty scored); Featherstone (penalty scored)	4–2	(penalty scored) Ross; (penalty missed) Cummins; (penalty scored) Edgar; (penalty missed) Orr

Forthbank Stadium, Stirling
Attendance: 343
Referee: Joel Kennedy
27 July 2024
15:00

Raith Rovers	1–1	Hamilton Academical
Kilday 61' (o.g.)		McGinty 56'
Penalties
Connolly (penalty scored); Smith (penalty scored); Gibson (penalty scored); Easton (penalty scored); Hamilton (penalty scored)	5–3	(penalty missed) MacDonald; (penalty scored) Murray; (penalty scored) Todorov; (penalty scored) Bradley

Stark's Park, Kirkcaldy
Attendance: 1,910
Referee: Chris Graham
27 July 2024
15:00

Ross County	3–0	Stirling Albion
Hale 29', 43'; Brown 80'

Victoria Park, Dingwall
Attendance: 1,027
Referee: Nick Walsh

== Best runners-up ==
Pos	Grp	Team	Pld	W	PW	PL	L	GF	GA	GD	Pts	Qualification
1	C	Queen's Park	4	3	0	0	1	16	5	+11	9	Qualification for the second round
2	A	Airdrieonians	4	3	0	0	1	15	5	+10	9	Qualification for the second round
3	B	Dundee United	4	3	0	0	1	10	5	+5	9	Qualification for the second round
4	E	Livingston	4	3	0	0	1	5	1	+4	9	
5	G	Partick Thistle	4	2	1	0	1	11	5	+6	8	
6	H	Raith Rovers	4	2	1	0	1	7	4	+3	8	
7	F	Alloa Athletic	4	2	1	0	1	7	5	+2	8	
8	D	Annan Athletic	4	2	0	1	1	7	5	+2	7	

Rules for classification: 1) goal difference, 2) goals scored, 3) away goals scored, 4) matches won, 5) away matches won, 6) drawing of lots.
