= 2023–24 Queen of the South F.C. season =

Queen of the South
2023–24 season
- Chairman: Billy Hewitson
- Manager: Marvin Bartley
- Stadium: Palmerston Park
- Scottish League One: 7th
- Scottish Cup: Fourth round
- League Cup: Group stages
- Challenge Cup: Fourth round
- Top goalscorer: League: Gavin Reilly (9); All: Gavin Reilly (14)
- Highest home attendance: 1,899 vs. Annan Athletic, 19 August 2023
- Lowest home attendance: 724 vs. Montrose, 24 February 2024
- Average home league attendance: 1,136
Home colours	Away colours

The 2023–24 season is Queen of the South's second consecutive season in the third tier of Scottish football, in Scottish League One. Queens are also competing in the Challenge Cup, League Cup and the Scottish Cup.

== Summary ==
Queens finished seventh in Scottish League One in their second season back in Scottish Football's third tier.

Queens reached the fourth round of the Challenge Cup, losing 2–1 to Arbroath at Palmerston Park.

The Doonhamers were knocked out after the first round of the League Cup after the completion of fixtures in Group G that included East Fife, Elgin City, Motherwell and Queen's Park.

Queens reached the fourth round of the Scottish Cup, losing 1–0 to St Mirren at St Mirren Park.

== Results and fixtures ==
Win Draw Loss Abandoned or Postponed

=== Preseason ===
24 June 2023 Friendly	East Kilbride	1–1	Queen of the South	East Kilbride
15:00	L. Brown (pen.)	QOSFC Report	Reilly	Stadium: K-Park Training Academy

1 July 2023 Friendly	Livingston	2–0	Queen of the South	Livingston
15:00	Pittman; Bradley	QOSFC Report		Stadium: Almondvale Stadium; Attendance: 511

5 July 2023 Friendly	Queen of the South	3–0	Gretna 2008	Dumfries
19:30	Kennedy; Mendy; Connelly	QOSFC Report		Stadium: Palmerston Park

9 July 2023 Friendly	Dundee United	2–1	Queen of the South	St Andrews
	Middleton; Glass	DUFC Report	McGuffie	Stadium: St Andrews Training Centre; Attendance: Closed doors

=== Scottish League One ===
5 August 2023 Match 1	Queen of the South	3–4	Alloa Athletic	Dumfries
15:00	McKechnie 2'; Reilly 37' (pen.), 84' (pen.)	QOSFC Report; SPFL Report	D. McKay 6'; Rodden 15', 44'; Sammon 29'	Stadium: Palmerston Park; Attendance: 1,134; Referee: Hardie; Man of the Match: Mimnaugh

12 August 2023 Match 2	Edinburgh City	1–2	Queen of the South	Edinburgh
15:00	Murray 14'	QOSFC Report; SPFL Report	Doherty 80'; McClelland 83' (yellow card) 45' (yellow-red card) 84'	Stadium: Meadowbank Stadium; Attendance: 523; Referee: L. Wilson; Man of the Match: Ambrose

19 August 2023 Match 3	Queen of the South	3–1	Annan Athletic	Dumfries
15:00	Connelly 60'; Reilly (penalty missed) 27' 62'; Walker 71'	QOSFC Report; SPFL Report	Ambrose 6' (o.g.)	Stadium: Palmerston Park; Attendance: 1,899; Referee: Grainger; Man of the Match: Reilly

26 August 2023 Match 4	Cove Rangers	1–2	Queen of the South	Aberdeen
15:00	Gillingham (yellow card) 45+3' (yellow-red card) 90+6'; Mykyta 90+8'	QOSFC Report; SPFL Report	Walker 3'; Mimnaugh 45+4'; Botterill (red card) 68'	Stadium: Balmoral Stadium; Attendance: 612; Referee: Grieve; Man of the Match: Ambrose

2 September 2023 Match 5	Queen of the South	2–3	Montrose	Dumfries
15:00	McKechnie 48'; L. Gibson 60'	QOSFC Report; SPFL Report	Quinn 10'; Brown 15', 67'	Stadium: Palmerston Park; Attendance: 1,201; Referee: Snedden; Man of the Match: L. Gibson

16 September 2023 Match 6	Falkirk	1–0	Queen of the South	Falkirk
15:00	Spencer 88'	QOSFC Report; SPFL Report		Stadium: Falkirk Stadium; Attendance: 4,502; Referee: Steven; Man of the Match: Ambrose

23 September 2023 Match 7	Queen of the South	1–2	Hamilton Academical	Dumfries
15:00	Cochrane 28'	QOSFC Report; SPFL Report	Henderson 15'; J. Longridge 84'	Stadium: Palmerston Park; Attendance: 1,250; Referee: Kirkland; Man of the Match: Stone

30 September 2023 Match 8	Kelty Hearts	3–1	Queen of the South	Kelty
15:00	Moore 43' (pen.); Lyon 48'; Tidser 90+4'	QOSFC Report; SPFL Report	Hutchinson 40'	Stadium: New Central Park; Attendance: 509; Referee: Whyte; Man of the Match: Hutchinson

7 October 2023 Match 9	Queen of the South	0–1	Stirling Albion	Dumfries
15:00		QOSFC Report; SPFL Report	McGregor 78'	Stadium: Palmerston Park; Attendance: 1,016; Referee: Stuart; Man of the Match: P. McKay

21 October 2023 Match 10	Annan Athletic	0–1	Queen of the South	Annan
15:00		QOSFC Report; SPFL Report	Reilly 43'	Stadium: Galabank; Attendance: 1,351; Referee: Scott; Man of the Match: Botterill

28 October 2023 Match 11	Queen of the South	0–1	Cove Rangers	Dumfries
15:00		QOSFC Report; SPFL Report	Burrell 83'	Stadium: Palmerston Park; Attendance: 1,024; Referee: Lambie; Man of the Match: P. McKay

4 November 2023 Match 12	Queen of the South	1–1	Falkirk	Dumfries
15:00	Reilly 24'	QOSFC Report; SPFL Report	Lang 11'	Stadium: Palmerston Park; Attendance: 1,498; Referee: Napier; Man of the Match: MacIntyre

11 November 2023 Match 13	Alloa Athletic	1–0	Queen of the South	Alloa
15:00	Roy 64'	QOSFC Report; SPFL Report		Stadium: Indodrill Stadium; Attendance: 687; Referee: Stuart; Man of the Match: MacIntyre

18 November 2023 Match 14	Queen of the South	1–3	Kelty Hearts	Dumfries
15:00	Thomson 31' (o.g.)	QOSFC Report; SPFL Report	F. Owens 44'; Tidser 49'; Lyon 55'	Stadium: Palmerston Park; Attendance: 942; Referee: Duncan; Man of the Match: Connelly

2 December 2023 Match 15	Hamilton Academical	5–0	Queen of the South	Hamilton
15:00	O'Hara 5', 54'; L. Smith 38'; Tumilty 44'; Murray 89'	QOSFC Report; SPFL Report	Doherty (red card) 86'	Stadium: New Douglas Park; Attendance: 1,279; Referee: L. Wilson; Man of the Match: Todd

9 December 2023 Match 16	Montrose	1–4	Queen of the South	Montrose
15:00	Brown 90+3'	QOSFC Report; SPFL Report	Connelly 4', 43'; Ferguson 22', 34'	Stadium: Links Park; Attendance: 451; Referee: Grainger; Man of the Match: Connelly

16 December 2023 Match 17	Queen of the South	3–1	Edinburgh City	Dumfries
15:00	Reilly 13'; L. Gibson 58'; McGuffie 90+4'	QOSFC Report; SPFL Report	Mahon 56'	Stadium: Palmerston Park; Attendance: 957; Referee: Calder; Man of the Match: Reilly

23 December 2023 Match 18	Stirling Albion	1–1	Queen of the South	Stirling
15:00	Carrick 26'	QOSFC Report; SPFL Report	P. McKay 75'	Stadium: Forthbank Stadium; Attendance: 898; Referee: Duncan; Man of the Match: McClelland

30 December 2023 Match 19	Queen of the South	2–1	Annan Athletic	Dumfries
15:00	McGuffie 38'; Reilly 61'	QOSFC Report; SPFL Report	A. Smith 31'; Goss (yellow card) 87' (yellow-red card) 90+3'	Stadium: Palmerston Park; Attendance: 1,556; Referee: Stuart; Man of the Match: Ambrose

6 January 2024 Match 20	Falkirk	1–0	Queen of the South	Falkirk
15:00	Nesbitt 46'	QOSFC Report; SPFL Report		Stadium: Falkirk Stadium; Attendance: 4,769; Referee: Fordyce; Man of the Match: Stone

13 January 2024 Match 21	Queen of the South	1–1	Alloa Athletic	Dumfries
15:00	Connelly 43'	QOSFC Report; SPFL Report	Wales 25'	Stadium: Palmerston Park; Attendance: 965; Referee: Grainger; Man of the Match: Connelly

27 January 2024 Match 22	Cove Rangers	0–2	Queen of the South	Aberdeen
15:00		QOSFC Report; SPFL Report	Brydon 13'; Doherty 65'	Stadium: Balmoral Stadium; Attendance: 564; Referee: Soutar; Man of the Match: Brydon

3 February 2024 Match 23	Queen of the South	0–2	Hamilton Academical	Dumfries
15:00		QOSFC Report; SPFL Report	L. Smith 57'; O'Hara 66'	Stadium: Palmerston Park; Attendance: 1,264; Referee: Wilson; Man of the Match: Brydon

10 February 2024 Match 24	Kelty Hearts	0–0	Queen of the South	Kelty
15:00		QOSFC Report; SPFL Report		Stadium: New Central Park; Attendance: 405; Referee: Grieve; Man of the Match: Brydon

17 February 2024 Match 25	Edinburgh City	1–1	Queen of the South	Edinburgh
15:00	Adams 90+6'	QOSFC Report; SPFL Report	Mumbongo 71'	Stadium: Meadowbank Stadium; Attendance: 456; Referee: Fordyce; Man of the Match: L. Gibson

24 February 2024 Match 26	Queen of the South	2–3	Montrose	Dumfries
17:30	Connelly 26'; Mumbongo 81'	QOSFC Report; SPFL Report	Gardyne 60'; Webster 71' (pen.), 75' (pen.)	Stadium: Palmerston Park; Attendance: 724; Referee: Scott; Man of the Match: Connelly

2 March 2024 Match 27	Queen of the South	2–2	Stirling Albion	Dumfries
15:00	Ferguson 6'; Todd 65'	QOSFC Report; SPFL Report	McPake 27'; Carrick (penalty missed) 39' 89'	Stadium: Palmerston Park; Attendance: 799; Referee: Lambie; Man of the Match: Todd

9 March 2024 Match 28	Annan Athletic	2–1	Queen of the South	Annan
15:00	Goss 26'; Douglas 34'	QOSFC Report; SPFL Report	Reilly 79'	Stadium: Galabank; Attendance: 1,318; Referee: Steven; Man of the Match: Reilly

16 March 2024 Match 29	Queen of the South	1–4	Falkirk	Dumfries
17:30	Todd 55'	QOSFC Report; SPFL Report	Morrison 59', 78' (pen.); Henderson 66'; Nesbitt 90'	Stadium: Palmerston Park; Attendance: 1,236; Referee: Duncan; Man of the Match: Todd

23 March 2024 Match 30	Alloa Athletic	0–2	Queen of the South	Alloa
15:00		QOSFC Report; SPFL Report	Mumbongo 11'; McGuffie 82'	Stadium: Indodrill Stadium; Attendance: 708; Referee: Muir; Man of the Match: McClelland

30 March 2024 Match 31	Hamilton Academical	0–0	Queen of the South	Hamilton
15:00	Barjonas (yellow card) 83' (yellow-red card) 84'	QOSFC Report; SPFL Report		Stadium: New Douglas Park; Attendance: 907; Referee: Hardie; Man of the Match: McClelland

6 April 2024 Match 32	Queen of the South	1-2	Kelty Hearts	Dumfries
15:00	Todd 66'	QOSFC Report; SPFL Report	Moore 15'; Johnston 68'	Stadium: Palmerston Park; Attendance: 953; Referee: Grieve; Man of the Match: Todd

13 April 2024 Match 33	Queen of the South	2-0	Edinburgh City	Dumfries
15:00	Reilly 65'; P. McKay 86'	QOSFC Report; SPFL Report		Stadium: Palmerston Park; Attendance: 859; Referee: Murdoch; Man of the Match: L. Gibson

20 April 2024 Match 34	Stirling Albion	0-0	Queen of the South	Stirling
15:00		QOSFC Report; SPFL Report		Stadium: Forthbank Stadium; Attendance: 1,138; Referee: Wilson; Man of the Match: Todd

27 April 2024 Match 35	Queen of the South	2-0	Cove Rangers	Dumfries
15:00	Houston 30'; Connelly 41' (pen.)	QOSFC Report; SPFL Report		Stadium: Palmerston Park; Attendance: 1,176; Referee: Calder; Man of the Match: L. Gibson

4 May 2024 Match 36	Montrose	3-2	Queen of the South	Montrose
15:00	Callaghan 52'; Quinn 64', 82'	QOSFC Report; SPFL Report	Mumbongo 18', 42'	Stadium: Links Park; Attendance: 871; Referee: Stuart; Man of the Match: Mumbongo

=== Scottish League Cup ===
18 July 2023 Round 1;Group G-1	Queen of the South	3–3 (4–5 p)	Motherwell	Dumfries
19:45	McKechnie 18'; Reilly 73', 83' (pen.)	QOSFC Report; SPFL Report	Spittal 40', 75'; Slattery 56'; Lamie (yellow card) 84' (yellow-red card) 90+1'	Stadium: Palmerston Park; Attendance: 1,932; Referee: Napier; Man of the Match: Reilly
	Penalties
	Reilly (penalty scored); Mimnaugh (penalty scored); P. McKay (penalty scored); Todd (penalty scored); McKechnie (penalty missed)		Spittal (penalty scored); Wilkinson (penalty scored); Slattery (penalty scored); P. McGinn (penalty scored); O'Donnell (penalty scored)

22 July 2023 Round 1; Group G-2	Elgin City	0–2	Queen of the South	Elgin
15:00		QOSFC Report; SPFL Report	McKechnie 17'; McClelland (yellow card) 66' (yellow-red card) 71'; P. McKay 89'	Stadium: Borough Briggs; Attendance: 517; Referee: Stuart; Man of the Match: McKechnie

25 July 2023 Round 1 Group G-3	Queen of the South	0–0 (3–5 p)	East Fife	Dumfries
19:45	McGuffie (red card) 79'	QOSFC Report; SPFL Report		Stadium: Palmerston Park; Attendance: 1,101; Referee: Grainger; Man of the Match: Botterill
	Penalties
	Reilly (penalty missed); Mimnaugh (penalty scored); P. McKay (penalty scored); Todd (penalty scored)		McManus (penalty scored); Shepherd (penalty scored); Murdoch (penalty scored); Walls (penalty scored); Newton (penalty scored)

29 July 2023 Round 1 Group G-4	Queen's Park	1–2	Queen of the South	Glasgow
15:00	Fox (red card) 47'; Paton (penalty missed) 84'; Healy 89'	QOSFC Report; SPFL Report	Reilly 65'; Cochrane 77'	Stadium: Lesser Hampden; Attendance: 826; Referee: Irvine; Man of the Match: McClelland

=== Scottish Challenge Cup ===
9 September 2023 Round 3	Partick Thistle	2–3	Queen of the South	Glasgow
15:00	Lawless 11' (pen.); Stanway 48'	QOSFC Report; SPFL Report	McGuffie 7'; Reilly 24'; Ambrose 87'	Stadium: Firhill Stadium; Attendance: 2,307; Referee: Anderson; Man of the Match: Ambrose

14 October 2023 Round 4	Queen of the South	1–2	Arbroath	Dumfries
15:00	Doherty 12'	QOSFC Report; SPFL Report	Bird 54'; McKenna 90'	Stadium: Palmerston Park; Attendance: 786; Referee: Williams; Man of the Match: Doherty

=== Scottish Cup ===
25 November 2022 Round 3	Queen of the South	2–2 (a.e.t.) (4–3 p)	Dundee United	Dumfries
15:00	Reilly 17'; Connelly 50'	QOSFC Report; BBC Sport Report	Fotheringham 6', 58'	Stadium: Palmerston Park; Attendance: 1,603; Referee: Graham; Man of the Match: Stone
	Penalties
	Todd (penalty scored); Johnstone (penalty scored); Irving (penalty scored); Connelly (penalty scored)		Holt (penalty scored); Moult (penalty scored); Middleton (penalty scored); Grimshaw (penalty missed); Cudjoe (penalty missed)

20 January 2024 Round 4	St Mirren	1–0	Queen of the South	Paisley
15:00	Gogic 71'	QOSFC Report; BBC Sport Report		Stadium: St Mirren Park; Attendance: 3,425; Referee: Walsh; Man of the Match: Ambrose

== Player statistics ==
=== Captains ===
No.	P	Name	Country	No. games	Notes
8	MF	Josh Todd	(England)	8	Vice Captain
6	MF	Harry Cochrane	(Scotland)	24	Club Captain
5	DF	Paul McKay	(Scotland)	8	Vice Captain
9	FW	Gavin Reilly	(Scotland)	4	Vice Captain

Last updated: 4 May 2024
Source: Competitive match reports.
Competitive matches only
Matches started as captain only
Country: FIFA nationality; No.: Squad number; P: Position; Name: Player name; No. Games: Number of games started as captain.

=== Squad ===
As of 4 May 2024

No.	Pos	Nat	Player	Total		Scottish League One		Challenge Cup		League Cup		Scottish Cup	
No.	Pos	Nat	Player	Apps	Goals	Apps	Goals	Apps	Goals	Apps	Goals	Apps	Goals
1	GK	(Switzerland) SUI	Gordon Botterill	18	0	12+2	0	1+0	0	3+0	0	0+0	0
2	DF	(Scotland) SCO	Jordan Houston	17	1	9+1	1	2+0	0	4+0	0	0+1	0
3	DF	(Scotland) SCO	Daniel Church	13	0	10+2	0	1+0	0	0+0	0	0+0	0
*4	MF	(Scotland) SCO	Iain Wilson	0	0	0+0	0	0+0	0	0+0	0	0+0	0
4	DF	(England) ENG	Max Kilsby	10	0	9+1	0	0+0	0	0+0	0	0+0	0
5	DF	(Scotland) SCO	Paul McKay	38	3	25+5	2	1+1	0	4+0	1	2+0	0
6	MF	(Scotland) SCO	Harry Cochrane	31	2	24+2	1	2+0	0	3+0	1	0+0	0
7	MF	(Scotland) SCO	Kieran McKechnie	42	4	20+14	2	1+1	0	4+0	2	0+2	0
8	MF	(England) ENG	Josh Todd	36	3	25+3	3	1+1	0	3+1	0	2+0	0
9	FW	(Scotland) SCO	Gavin Reilly	36	14	24+6	9	1+0	1	4+0	3	1+0	1
10	FW	(Scotland) SCO	Lee Connelly	38	7	25+6	6	1+0	0	2+2	0	2+0	1
11	MF	(Scotland) SCO	Craig McGuffie	27	4	8+13	3	1+0	1	2+1	0	1+1	0
12	GK	(Scotland) SCO	Charlie Cowie	1	0	0+1	0	0+0	0	0+0	0	0+0	0
14	FW	(England) ENG	Jake Hutchinson	17	1	5+8	1	0+2	0	0+0	0	0+2	0
15	DF	(Northern Ireland) NIR	Kyle McClelland	37	1	31+0	1	1+0	0	3+0	0	2+0	0
17	MF	(Scotland) SCO	Alex Ferguson	34	3	27+6	3	0+0	0	0+0	0	1+0	0
18	MF	(Scotland) SCO	Reegan Mimnaugh	11	1	5+1	1	1+0	0	4+0	0	0+0	0
19	DF	(Scotland) SCO	Oscar MacIntyre	15	0	11+3	0	0+0	0	0+0	0	1+0	0
20	FW	(Scotland) SCO	Ross Irving	7	0	0+2	0	0+0	0	0+4	0	0+1	0
21	GK	(Scotland) SCO	Murray Johnson	1	0	0+0	0	0+0	0	1+0	0	0+0	0
*22	MF	(England) ENG	Toby Raggett	0	0	0+0	0	0+0	0	0+0	0	0+0	0
22	FW	(Sweden) SWE	Joel Mumbongo	12	5	5+7	5	0+0	0	0+0	0	0+0	0
23	DF	(Scotland) SCO	Cammy Logan	43	0	32+3	0	1+1	0	4+0	0	2+0	0
24	DF	(Nigeria) NGA	Efe Ambrose	32	1	21+5	0	2+0	1	2+0	0	2+0	0
25	FW	(Scotland) SCO	Kyle Doherty	28	3	10+16	2	1+0	1	0+0	0	1+0	0
26	MF	(Scotland) SCO	Euan Ross	1	0	0+1	0	0+0	0	0+0	0	0+0	0
27	FW	(Scotland) SCO	Lewis Gibson	31	2	12+16	2	2+0	0	0+0	0	1+0	0
28	MF	(Scotland) SCO	Ben Johnstone	11	0	4+4	0	0+0	0	0+2	0	0+1	0
29	DF	(Scotland) SCO	Jay Burns	1	0	0+1	0	0+0	0	0+0	0	0+0	0
30	MF	(England) ENG	Harvey Walker	33	2	7+19	2	0+1	0	1+3	0	1+1	0
31	GK	(Scotland) SCO	Harry Stone	27	0	24+0	0	1+0	0	0+0	0	2+0	0
32	DF	(Scotland) SCO	Lewis Currie	1	0	0+1	0	0+0	0	0+0	0	0+0	0
33	MF	(Scotland) SCO	Finlay Kennedy	0	0	0+0	0	0+0	0	0+0	0	0+0	0
34	DF	(Scotland) SCO	Niall Rogerson	0	0	0+0	0	0+0	0	0+0	0	0+0	0
35	DF	(Scotland) SCO	Jack Brydon	14	1	11+1	1	1+0	0	0+0	0	1+0	0
36	MF	(Scotland) SCO	Greig Frame	0	0	0+0	0	0+0	0	0+0	0	0+0	0
37	FW	(Scotland) SCO	Keir Foster	0	0	0+0	0	0+0	0	0+0	0	0+0	0
38	MF	(Scotland) SCO	Andrew Oram	0	0	0+0	0	0+0	0	0+0	0	0+0	0
39	FW	(The Gambia) GAM	Peter Mendy	0	0	0+0	0	0+0	0	0+0	0	0+0	0

=== Disciplinary record ===
As of 4 May 2024 (UTC)

Number	Nation	Position	Name	Scottish League One		Challenge Cup		League Cup		Scottish Cup		Total	
Number	Nation	Position	Name	Booked	Sent off (straight red)	Booked	Sent off (straight red)	Booked	Sent off (straight red)	Booked	Sent off (straight red)	Booked	Sent off (straight red)
1	(Switzerland)	GK	Gordon Botterill	0	1	0	0	0	0	0	0	0	1
2	(Scotland)	DF	Jordan Houston	0	0	0	0	1	0	0	0	1	0
3	(Scotland)	DF	Daniel Church	2	0	0	0	0	0	0	0	2	0
4	(England)	DF	Max Kilsby	1	0	0	0	0	0	0	0	1	0
5	(Scotland)	DF	Paul McKay	1	0	1	0	0	0	0	0	2	0
6	(Scotland)	MF	Harry Cochrane	4	0	1	0	2	0	0	0	7	0
7	(Scotland)	MF	Kieran McKechnie	5	0	0	0	0	0	0	0	5	0
8	(England)	MF	Josh Todd	2	0	0	0	0	0	0	0	2	0
9	(Scotland)	FW	Gavin Reilly	3	0	0	0	0	0	0	0	3	0
10	(Scotland)	FW	Lee Connelly	9	0	0	0	1	0	1	0	11	0
11	(Scotland)	MF	Craig McGuffie	1	0	0	0	0	1	0	0	1	1
14	(England)	FW	Jake Hutchinson	2	0	0	0	0	0	0	0	2	0
15	(Northern Ireland)	DF	Kyle McClelland	10	1	0	0	2	1	0	0	12	2
17	(Scotland)	MF	Alex Ferguson	7	0	0	0	0	0	0	0	7	0
18	(Scotland)	MF	Reegan Mimnaugh	2	0	0	0	0	0	0	0	2	0
19	(Scotland)	DF	Oscar MacIntyre	1	0	0	0	0	0	0	0	1	0
20	(Scotland)	FW	Ross Irving	1	0	0	0	0	0	0	0	1	0
22	(Sweden)	FW	Joel Mumbongo	3	0	0	0	0	0	0	0	3	0
23	(Scotland)	DF	Cammy Logan	1	0	0	0	0	0	0	0	1	0
24	(Nigeria)	DF	Efe Ambrose	3	0	1	0	0	0	0	0	4	0
25	(Scotland)	FW	Kyle Doherty	4	1	0	0	0	0	0	0	4	1
27	(Scotland)	FW	Lewis Gibson	3	0	0	0	0	0	0	0	3	0
28	(Scotland)	MF	Ben Johnstone	0	0	0	0	1	0	0	0	1	0
30	(England)	MF	Harvey Walker	3	0	0	0	0	0	0	0	3	0
31	(Scotland)	GK	Harry Stone	1	0	0	0	0	0	0	0	1	0
35	(Scotland)	DF	Jack Brydon	3	0	0	0	0	0	0	0	3	0
Totals				72	3	3	0	7	2	1	0	83	5

=== Top scorers ===
Last updated 4 May 2024

Position	Nation	Name	Scottish League One	League Cup	Challenge Cup	Scottish Cup	Total
1	(Scotland)	Gavin Reilly	9	3	1	1	14
2	(Scotland)	Lee Connelly	6	0	0	1	7
3	(Sweden)	Joel Mumbongo	5	0	0	0	5
4	(Scotland)	Kieran McKechnie	2	2	0	0	4
=	(Scotland)	Craig McGuffie	3	0	1	0	4
6	(Scotland)	Kyle Doherty	2	0	1	0	3
=	(Scotland)	Alex Ferguson	3	0	0	0	3
=	(England)	Josh Todd	3	0	0	0	3
=	(Scotland)	Paul McKay	2	1	0	0	3
10	(England)	Harvey Walker	2	0	0	0	2
=	(Scotland)	Harry Cochrane	1	1	0	0	2
=	(Scotland)	Lewis Gibson	2	0	0	0	2
13	(Northern Ireland)	Kyle McClelland	1	0	0	0	1
=	(Scotland)	Reegan Mimnaugh	1	0	0	0	1
=	(Nigeria)	Efe Ambrose	0	0	1	0	1
=	(England)	Jake Hutchinson	1	0	0	0	1
=	(Scotland)	Jack Brydon	1	0	0	0	1
=	(Scotland)	Jordan Houston	1	0	0	0	1

=== Clean sheets ===
R	Pos	Nat	Name	Scottish League One	League Cup	Challenge Cup	Scottish Cup	Total
1	GK	(Switzerland)	Gordon Botterill	2.5	1	0	0	3.5
12	GK	(Scotland)	Charlie Cowie	0	0	0	0	0
21	GK	(Scotland)	Murray Johnson	0	1	0	0	1
31	GK	(Scotland)	Harry Stone	5.5	0	0	0	5.5
Total				8	2	0	0	10

Last updated: 4 May 2024
Source: Match reports in Competitive matches

== Team statistics ==
=== Scottish League One ===
==== League table ====
Pos	Team	Pld	W	D	L	GF	GA	GD	Pts	Promotion, qualification or relegation
5	Cove Rangers	36	14	7	15	58	63	−5	49	
6	Kelty Hearts	36	12	8	16	48	63	−15	44	
7	Queen of the South	36	11	8	17	46	53	−7	41	
8	Annan Athletic	36	9	12	15	55	68	−13	39	
9	Stirling Albion (R)	36	10	9	17	39	58	−19	39	Qualification for the League One play-offs

Rules for classification: 1) Points; 2) Goal difference; 3) Goals scored; 4) Head-to-to head points; 5) Head-to-head goal difference; 6) Play-off (only for deciding promotion, play-off participation and relegation).
(R) Relegated

==== Results by round ====
Round	1	2	3	4	5	6	7	8	9	10	11	12	13	14	15	16	17	18	19	20	21	22	23	24	25	26	27	28	29	30	31	32	33	34	35	36
Ground	H	A	H	A	H	A	H	A	H	A	H	H	A	H	A	A	H	A	H	A	H	A	H	A	A	H	H	A	H	A	A	H	H	A	H	A
Result	L	W	W	W	L	L	L	L	L	W	L	D	L	L	L	W	W	D	W	L	D	W	L	D	D	L	D	L	L	W	D	L	W	D	W	L
Position	6	4	3	3	4	4	5	6	7	6	7	8	8	8	8	8	7	7	5	7	7	5	7	7	7	8	8	8	8	8	7	7	7	7	7	7

Updated to match(es) played on 4 May 2024. Source:
A = Away; H = Home; W = Win; D = Draw; L = Loss

=== League Cup table ===
Pos	Team	Pld	W	PW	PL	L	GF	GA	GD	Pts	Qualification	MOT	QOS	EFI	QPA	ELG
1	Motherwell	4	3	1	0	0	9	3	+6	11	Qualification for the second round	—	—	3–0	1–0	—
2	Queen of the South	4	2	0	2	0	7	4	+3	8		3–3p	—	0–0p	—	—
3	East Fife	4	1	2	0	1	3	4	−1	7		—	—	—	p0–0	3–1
4	Queen's Park	4	1	0	1	2	6	3	+3	4		—	1–2	—	—	5–0
5	Elgin City	4	0	0	0	4	1	12	−11	0		0–2	0–2	—	—	—

Rules for classification: 1) goal difference, 2) goals scored, 3) away goals scored, 4) matches won, 5) away matches won, 6) drawing of lots.

=== Management statistics ===
Last updated 4 May 2024

Name	From	To	P	W	D	L	Win% (Note: Win% is the percentage of matches won rounded to two decimal places.)
Marvin Bartley	18 July 2023	4 May 2024	44	14	11	19	31.82

== Transfers ==
=== Players in ===
Player	From	Fee
(Scotland) Kieran McKechnie	Free Agent	Free
(Switzerland) Gordon Botterill	Free Agent	Free
(Scotland) Murray Johnson	(Scotland) Hibernian	Loan
(Scotland) Kyle Doherty	(Scotland) Clyde	Undisclosed
(Scotland) Charlie Cowie	(Scotland) Queen of the South	Free
(England) Josh Todd	(Scotland) Queen of the South	Free
(Scotland) Ross Irving	(Scotland) Queen of the South	Free
(Scotland) Harry Cochrane	(Scotland) Queen of the South	Free
(Northern Ireland) Kyle McClelland	(Scotland) Hibernian	Loan
(Scotland) Lee Connelly	(Scotland) Queen of the South	Free
(Scotland) Craig McGuffie	(Scotland) Falkirk	Free
(Scotland) Reegan Mimnaugh	(Scotland) Hamilton Academical	Free
(Scotland) Cammy Logan	(Scotland) Heart of Midlothian	Free
(England) Harvey Walker	(England) Aldershot Town	Free
(Nigeria) Efe Ambrose	(Scotland) Greenock Morton	Free
(Scotland) Alex Ferguson	(Scotland) St Johnstone	Loan
(Scotland) Oscar MacIntyre	(Scotland) Hibernian	Loan
(England) Toby Raggett	(England) Marlow	Free
(Scotland) Harry Stone	(Scotland) Heart of Midlothian	Loan
(England) Jake Hutchinson	(England) Colchester United	Free
(Sweden) Joel Mumbongo	(Scotland) Hamilton Academical	Loan
(England) Max Kilsby	(England) Carlisle United	Loan

=== Players out ===
Player	To	Fee
(Scotland) David McKay	(Scotland) Alloa Athletic	Free
(Scotland) Ciaran McKenna	Free Agent	Free
(Scotland) Stuart Morrison	(Scotland) Forfar Athletic	Free
(Scotland) Stephen Hendrie	(Scotland) Hamilton Academical	Free
(Scotland) Connor Murray	(Scotland) Hamilton Academical	Free
(Scotland) Michael Ruth	(Scotland) Dumbarton	Free
(Republic of Ireland) Ruari Paton	(Scotland) Queen's Park	Free
(Scotland) Calvin McGrory	(Scotland) East Kilbride	Free
(Scotland) Euan East	(Northern Ireland) Linfield	Free
(Scotland) Dom McMahon	(Scotland) Albion Rovers	Free
(Scotland) Ryan Muir	(Scotland) Annan Athletic	Free
(Scotland) Charlie Cowie	(Scotland) Gretna 2008	Loan
(Scotland) Iain Wilson	(Scotland) Greenock Morton	Loan
(England) Jake Hutchinson	(England) Eastbourne Borough	Loan
(England) Toby Raggett	(England) Marlow	Free
(Scotland) Finlay Kennedy	(Scotland) Threave Rovers	Loan
(Scotland) Ross Irving	(Scotland) Threave Rovers	Loan
(Scotland) Oscar MacIntyre	(Scotland) Hibernian	Loan

== See also ==
- List of Queen of the South F.C. seasons
