= 2024–25 Scottish League Cup =

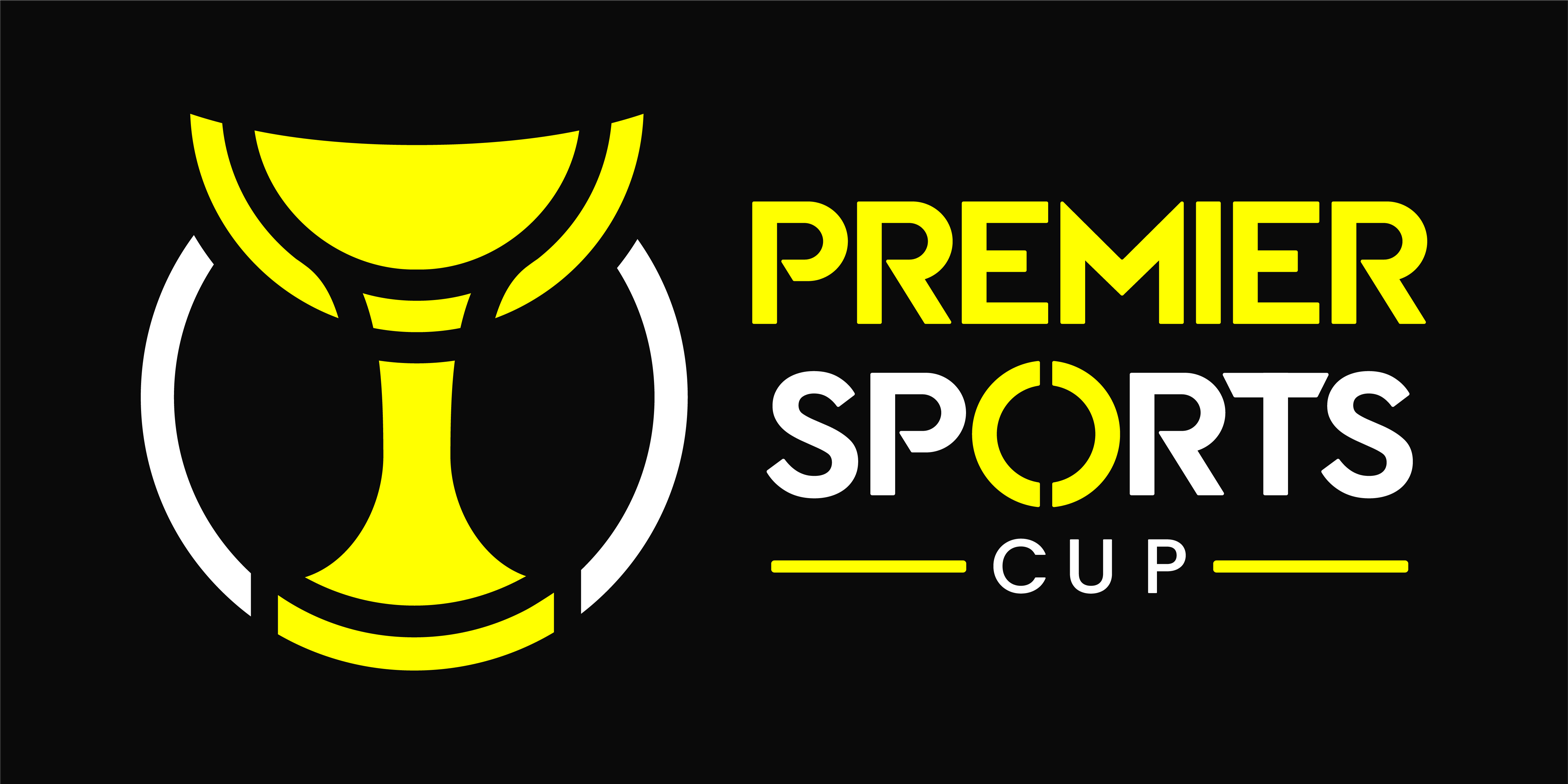
- Premier Sports Cup logo

Tournament details
- Country: Scotland
- Dates: 13 July – 15 December 2024
- Teams: 45

Final positions
- Champions: Celtic (22nd title)
- Runners-up: Rangers

Tournament statistics
- Matches played: 95
- Goals scored: 320 (3.37 per match)
- Attendance: 441,031 (4,642 per match)
- Top goal scorer: Daizen Maeda (6 goals) Ben Wilson (6 goals)

The 2024–25 Scottish League Cup, also known as the Premier Sports Cup for sponsorship reasons, was the 79th season of Scotland's second-most prestigious football knockout competition. Rangers were the defending champions, but they lost 4–5 on penalties to Celtic in the final.

== Schedule ==
Round	First match date	Fixtures	Clubs
Group stage	13 July 2024	80	45 → 16
Second round	17 August 2024	8	16 → 8
Quarter-finals	21 September 2024	4	8 → 4
Semi-finals	2 November 2024	2	4 → 2
Final	15 December 2024	1	2 → 1

== Format ==
The competition began with eight groups of five teams. The five clubs initially competing in the UEFA Champions League (Celtic and Rangers), Europa League (Heart of Midlothian and Kilmarnock) and Conference League (St Mirren) received a bye to the second round. The group stage consists of 40 teams: all remaining teams that competed across the SPFL in 2023–24, the 2023–24 Highland Football League champions (Buckie Thistle) and runners-up (Brechin City), and the 2023–24 Lowland Football League champions (East Kilbride).

The winners of each of the eight groups, as well as the three best runners-up, progressed to the second round (last 16). At this stage, the competition reverted to the traditional knock-out format. The three group winners with the highest points total and the European entrants were seeded.

=== Bonus point system ===
The traditional point system of awarding three points for a win and one point for a draw was used. In addition, for each group stage match that finishes in a draw, a penalty shoot-out took place, with the winner being awarded a bonus point.

== Group stage ==
The teams were seeded according to their final league positions in 2023–24 and drawn into eight groups, with each group comprising one team from each pot. The draw for the group stage took place on 29 May 2024 and was broadcast live on the Premier Sports and SPFL YouTube channels.

=== Group A ===
Pos	Team	Pld	W	PW	PL	L	GF	GA	GD	Pts	Qualification	ABE	AIR	QOS	EKB	DUM
1	Aberdeen	4	4	0	0	0	15	1	+14	12	Qualification for the second round	—	2–1	—	—	6–0
2	Airdrieonians	4	3	0	0	1	15	5	+10	9	Qualification for the second round	—	—	2–0	8–0	—
3	Queen of the South	4	2	0	0	2	5	6	−1	6		0–3	—	—	—	2–0
4	East Kilbride	4	0	1	0	3	2	16	−14	2		0–4	—	1–3	—	—
5	Dumbarton	4	0	0	1	3	4	13	−9	1		—	3–4	—	1–1p	—

Rules for classification: 1) goal difference, 2) goals scored, 3) away goals scored, 4) matches won, 5) away matches won, 6) drawing of lots.

=== Group B ===
Pos	Team	Pld	W	PW	PL	L	GF	GA	GD	Pts	Qualification	FAL	DUN	AYR	STE	BUC
1	Falkirk	4	3	0	0	1	11	2	+9	9	Qualification for the second round	—	2–0	—	4–0	—
2	Dundee United	4	3	0	0	1	10	5	+5	9	Qualification for the second round	—	—	2–1	3–0	—
3	Ayr United	4	3	0	0	1	9	5	+4	9		1–0	—	—	—	3–2
4	Stenhousemuir	4	1	0	0	3	5	11	−6	3		—	—	1–4	—	4–0
5	Buckie Thistle	4	0	0	0	4	5	17	−12	0		1–5	2–5	—	—	—

Rules for classification: 1) goal difference, 2) goals scored, 3) away goals scored, 4) matches won, 5) away matches won, 6) drawing of lots.

=== Group C ===
Pos	Team	Pld	W	PW	PL	L	GF	GA	GD	Pts	Qualification	HIB	QPA	PET	KEL	ELG
1	Hibernian	4	3	0	0	1	14	2	+12	9	Qualification for the second round	—	5–1	4–0	—	—
2	Queen's Park	4	3	0	0	1	16	5	+11	9	Qualification for the second round	—	—	—	6–0	4–0
3	Peterhead	4	2	0	0	2	5	11	−6	6		—	0–5	—	—	4–2
4	Kelty Hearts	4	1	0	1	2	2	8	−6	4		1–0	—	0–1	—	—
5	Elgin City	4	0	1	0	3	3	14	−11	2		0–5	—	—	p1–1	—

Rules for classification: 1) goal difference, 2) goals scored, 3) away goals scored, 4) matches won, 5) away matches won, 6) drawing of lots.

=== Group D ===
Pos	Team	Pld	W	PW	PL	L	GF	GA	GD	Pts	Qualification	DND	ANN	ARB	ICT	BON
1	Dundee	4	4	0	0	0	18	2	+16	12	Qualification for the second round	—	3–1	—	6–0	—
2	Annan Athletic	4	2	0	1	1	7	5	+2	7		—	—	—	1–0	2–2p
3	Arbroath	4	1	1	0	2	1	5	−4	5		0–2	0–3	—	—	—
4	Inverness Caledonian Thistle	4	1	0	1	2	3	7	−4	4		—	—	0–0p	—	3–0
5	Bonnyrigg Rose	4	0	1	0	3	3	13	−10	2		1–7	—	0–1	—	—

Rules for classification: 1) goal difference, 2) goals scored, 3) away goals scored, 4) matches won, 5) away matches won, 6) drawing of lots.

=== Group E ===
Pos	Team	Pld	W	PW	PL	L	GF	GA	GD	Pts	Qualification	SPA	LIV	FOR	DNF	COV
1	The Spartans	4	3	0	0	1	7	3	+4	9	Qualification for the second round	—	—	1–0	0–3	—
2	Livingston	4	3	0	0	1	5	1	+4	9		0–1	—	—	1–0	—
3	Forfar Athletic	4	2	0	0	2	5	3	+2	6		—	0–2	—	—	3–0 (Note: Forfar Athletic were awarded a technical 3−0 win over Cove, who fielded an ineligible player. The match had originally finished 1–1, with Forfar securing the bonus point following a 3–1 win on penalties.)
4	Dunfermline Athletic	4	1	0	0	3	4	5	−1	3		—	—	0–2	—	1–2
5	Cove Rangers	4	1	0	0	3	2	11	−9	3		0–5	0–2	—	—	—

Rules for classification: 1) goal difference, 2) goals scored, 3) away goals scored, 4) matches won, 5) away matches won, 6) drawing of lots.

=== Group F ===
Pos	Team	Pld	W	PW	PL	L	GF	GA	GD	Pts	Qualification	STJ	ALL	EFI	GMO	BRE
1	St Johnstone	4	3	0	0	1	11	5	+6	9	Qualification for the second round	—	—	5–1	2–0	—
2	Alloa Athletic	4	2	1	0	1	7	5	+2	8		3–2	—	p0–0	—	—
3	East Fife	4	2	0	1	1	8	5	+3	7		—	—	—	3–0	4–0
4	Greenock Morton	4	2	0	0	2	3	6	−3	6		—	2–1	—	—	1–0
5	Brechin City	4	0	0	0	4	2	10	−8	0		1–2	1–3	—	—	—

Rules for classification: 1) goal difference, 2) goals scored, 3) away goals scored, 4) matches won, 5) away matches won, 6) drawing of lots.

=== Group G ===
Pos	Team	Pld	W	PW	PL	L	GF	GA	GD	Pts	Qualification	MOT	PAR	MON	CLY	EDI
1	Motherwell	4	2	1	1	0	7	2	+5	9	Qualification for the second round	—	0–0p	—	—	3–0
2	Partick Thistle	4	2	1	0	1	11	5	+6	8		—	—	3–2	2–3	—
3	Montrose	4	2	0	1	1	6	5	+1	7		1–1p	—	—	—	2–1
4	Clyde	4	2	0	0	2	9	6	+3	6		1–3	—	0–1	—	—
5	Edinburgh City	4	0	0	0	4	1	16	−15	0		—	0–6	—	0–5	—

Rules for classification: 1) goal difference, 2) goals scored, 3) away goals scored, 4) matches won, 5) away matches won, 6) drawing of lots.

=== Group H ===
Pos	Team	Pld	W	PW	PL	L	GF	GA	GD	Pts	Qualification	ROS	RAI	HAM	STI	STR
1	Ross County	4	4	0	0	0	10	3	+7	12	Qualification for the second round	—	2–1	—	3–0	—
2	Raith Rovers	4	2	1	0	1	7	4	+3	8		—	—	p1–1	—	2–1
3	Hamilton Academical	4	1	0	2	1	5	3	+2	5		1–2	—	—	0–0p	—
4	Stirling Albion	4	0	2	0	2	2	8	−6	4		—	0–3	—	—	p2–2
5	Stranraer	4	0	0	1	3	4	10	−6	1		1–3	—	0–3	—	—

Rules for classification: 1) goal difference, 2) goals scored, 3) away goals scored, 4) matches won, 5) away matches won, 6) drawing of lots.

=== Best runners-up ===
Pos	Grp	Team	Pld	W	PW	PL	L	GF	GA	GD	Pts	Qualification
1	C	Queen's Park	4	3	0	0	1	16	5	+11	9	Qualification for the second round
2	A	Airdrieonians	4	3	0	0	1	15	5	+10	9	Qualification for the second round
3	B	Dundee United	4	3	0	0	1	10	5	+5	9	Qualification for the second round
4	E	Livingston	4	3	0	0	1	5	1	+4	9	
5	G	Partick Thistle	4	2	1	0	1	11	5	+6	8	
6	H	Raith Rovers	4	2	1	0	1	7	4	+3	8	
7	F	Alloa Athletic	4	2	1	0	1	7	5	+2	8	
8	D	Annan Athletic	4	2	0	1	1	7	5	+2	7	

Rules for classification: 1) goal difference, 2) goals scored, 3) away goals scored, 4) matches won, 5) away matches won, 6) drawing of lots.

== Knockout phase ==
=== Second round ===
==== Draw and seeding ====
Celtic, Rangers, Heart of Midlothian, Kilmarnock and St Mirren entered the competition at this stage, due to their participation in UEFA club competitions.

Teams in bold advanced to the quarter-finals.

Seeded	Unseeded
**Aberdeen**; **Celtic**; **Dundee**; Heart of Midlothian; Kilmarnock; **Rangers**; Ross County; St Mirren	Airdrieonians†; **Dundee United**; **Falkirk**†; Hibernian; **Motherwell**; Queen's Park†; St Johnstone; **The Spartans****

Notes

- † denotes teams playing in the Championship.
- ** denotes team playing in League Two.

==== Matches ====
17 August 2024	**Aberdeen**	**1–0**	Queen's Park	Aberdeen
15:00	Keskinen 90'			Stadium: Pittodrie Stadium; Attendance: 8,939; Referee: Colin Steven

17 August 2024	**Falkirk**	**2–0**	Heart of Midlothian	Falkirk
15:00	Ross 53'; Tait 81'			Stadium: Falkirk Stadium; Attendance: 6,653; Referee: David Dickinson

17 August 2024	**Dundee**	**6–1**	Airdrieonians	Dundee
15:00	Palmer-Houlden 12'; McGhee 40'; Tiffoney 61'; Portales 74'; Main 86'; Cameron 90'		Frizzell 76'	Stadium: Dens Park; Attendance: 3,327; Referee: Euan Anderson

17 August 2024	**The Spartans**	**1–0**	Ross County	Edinburgh
15:00	Henderson 46'			Stadium: Ainslie Park; Attendance: 712; Referee: Dan McFarlane

17 August 2024	**Rangers**	**2–0**	St Johnstone	Glasgow
17:45	Dessers 61'; McCausland 90'			Stadium: Hampden Park; Attendance: 23,261; Referee: Matthew MacDermid

18 August 2024	**Dundee United**	**1–0**	St Mirren	Dundee
14:00	Graham 34'			Stadium: Tannadice Park; Attendance: 4,285; Referee: John Beaton

18 August 2024	**Motherwell**	**1–0** (a.e.t.)	Kilmarnock	Motherwell
14:00	Ebiye 96'			Stadium: Fir Park; Attendance: 4,371; Referee: Nick Walsh

18 August 2024	**Celtic**	**3–1**	Hibernian	Glasgow
15:00	Maeda 4', 15'; Kühn 56'		Kukharevych 34'	Stadium: Celtic Park; Attendance: 47,370; Referee: Kevin Clancy

=== Draw ===
The draw for the quarter-finals took place on 18 August 2024 following the Celtic v Hibernian match live on Premier Sports 1.

Teams in bold advanced to the semi-finals.

Premiership	Championship	League Two
**Aberdeen**; **Celtic**; Dundee; Dundee United; **Motherwell**; **Rangers**	Falkirk	The Spartans

==== Matches ====
20 September 2024	**Motherwell**	**2–1**	Dundee United	Motherwell
19:45	Robinson 45'; Miller 90' (pen.)		Moult 83'	Stadium: Fir Park; Attendance: 8,327; Referee: John Beaton

21 September 2024	**Aberdeen**	**4–0**	The Spartans	Aberdeen
17:30	Guèye 14'; Nisbet 44'; Clarkson 46'; Sokler 72'			Stadium: Pittodrie Stadium; Attendance: 11,615; Referee: Ross Hardie

21 September 2024	**Rangers**	**3–0**	Dundee	Glasgow
17:30	Dessers 18', 66'; Tavernier 50' (pen.)			Stadium: Ibrox Stadium; Attendance: 33,665 (partial closure of Copland Road Stand); Referee: Chris Graham

22 September 2024	**Celtic**	**5–2**	Falkirk	Glasgow
15:00	Bernardo 21'; Idah 70', 72'; Kühn 81', 84'		MacIver 11'; Yeats 45'	Stadium: Celtic Park; Attendance: 42,960; Referee: Calum Scott

=== Draw ===
The draw for the semi-finals took place on 22 September 2024 following the Celtic v Falkirk match live on Premier Sports 1.

Teams in bold advanced to the final.

- Aberdeen
- **Celtic**
- Motherwell
- **Rangers**

==== Matches ====
2 November 2024	**Celtic**	**6–0**	Aberdeen	Glasgow
17:30 GMT	Carter-Vickers 29'; Furuhashi 32'; Maeda 40', 49', 85'; Kühn 59'			Stadium: Hampden Park; Attendance: 47,544; Referee: Kevin Clancy

3 November 2024	Motherwell	**1–2**	**Rangers**	Glasgow
15:00 GMT	Halliday 25'		Dessers 49'; Bajrami 81'	Stadium: Hampden Park; Attendance: 37,077; Referee: Nick Walsh

=== Final ===
15 December 2024	**Celtic**	**3–3** (a.e.t.) (**5–4** p)	Rangers	Hampden Park, Glasgow
15:30 GMT	Taylor 56'; Maeda 60'; Kühn 87'	Report	Bajrami 41'; Diomande 75'; Danilo 88'	Attendance: 49,420; Referee: John Beaton

== Media coverage ==
The domestic broadcasting rights for the competition are held exclusively by Premier Sports, who will broadcast between 12 and 16 live matches per season, as well as highlights. Premier Sports further announced they would stream up to 25 additional games from the group stage on their website. The broadcaster will also broadcast all games live from the second round onwards, either streamed or televised, subject to blackout rules.

The following matches will be broadcast live:

Round	Date	Match
Group stage	13 July 2024 (Matchday 1)	Falkirk v Dundee United (streamed); Elgin City v Hibernian (streamed); Bonnyrigg Rose v Dundee (streamed); Brechin City v St. Johnstone (streamed); Motherwell v Edinburgh City (streamed); Stranraer v Ross County (streamed); Queen of the South v Aberdeen
Group stage	16 July 2024 (Matchday 2)	Dundee United v Stenhousemuir (streamed); Arbroath v Dundee (streamed); Dunfermline Athletic v Forfar Athletic (streamed); Montrose v Motherwell (streamed); Hibernian v Queen's Park
Group stage	20 July 2024 (Matchday 3)	East Kilbride v Aberdeen (streamed); Kelty Hearts v Hibernian (streamed); St. Johnstone v Greenock Morton (streamed); Clyde v Motherwell (streamed); Ross County v Raith Rovers (streamed); Dundee United v Ayr United
Group stage	23 July 2024 (Matchday 4)	Buckie Thistle v Dundee United (streamed); Dundee v Annan Athletic (streamed); Alloa Athletic v St. Johnstone (streamed); Hamilton Academical v Ross County (streamed); Partick Thistle v Clyde (streamed); Aberdeen v Airdrieonians
Group stage	27 July 2024 (Matchday 5)	Aberdeen v Dumbarton (streamed); Hibernian v Peterhead (streamed); Dundee v Inverness CT (streamed); St. Johnstone v East Fife (streamed); Ross County v Stirling Albion (streamed)
Group stage	28 July 2024 (Matchday 5)	Motherwell v Partick Thistle
Second Round	17 August 2024	Aberdeen v Queen's Park (streamed); Falkirk v Heart of Midlothian (streamed); Dundee v Airdrieonians (streamed); The Spartans v Ross County (streamed); Rangers v St. Johnstone
Second Round	18 August 2024	Dundee United v St. Mirren (streamed); Motherwell v Kilmarnock (streamed); Celtic v Hibernian
Quarter-Finals	20 September 2024	Motherwell v Dundee United (streamed)
Quarter-Finals	21 September 2024	Aberdeen v The Spartans (streamed); Rangers v Dundee
Quarter-Finals	22 September 2024	Celtic v Falkirk
Semi-Finals	2 November 2024	Celtic v Aberdeen
Semi-Finals	3 November 2024	Motherwell v Rangers
Final	15 December 2024	Celtic v Rangers
