= Pharrell Willis =

English footballer (born 2003)

Personal information
- Full name: Pharrell Jeremiah Kieran Willis
- Date of birth: 23 February 2003 (age 23)
- Place of birth: London, England
- Position: Midfielder

Team information
- Current team: Columbus Crew 2
- Number: 36

Youth career
- –2019: Independent FC
- 2019–2022: Middlesbrough

Senior career*
Years	Team	Apps	(Gls)
2022–2025	Middlesbrough	1	(0)
2024–2025	→ Queen of the South (loan)	5	(1)
2025	→ Maidstone United (loan)	6	(0)
2025–	Columbus Crew 2	4	(1)
- * Club domestic league appearances and goals as of 14:14, 16 May 2025 (UTC)

Pharrell Jeremiah Kieran Willis (born 23 February 2003) is an English footballer who plays as a midfielder for MLS Next Pro club Columbus Crew 2.

== Career ==
Born in London, Willis joined Championship club Middlesbrough aged sixteen having been spotted by Academy scout Martin Carter playing for Independent FC.

In July 2022, Willis signed a first professional contract having impressed for the under-23s side in his third year as a scholar. On 8 November 2022, he made his senior professional debut as a substitute in a 3–0 league victory away at Blackpool. He was rewarded later that same week with a new contract, keeping him at the club until 2025. He was unable to fully capitalise on the opportunity however, suffering an injury in January 2023 during an under-21 fixture, ruling him out until the following February.

On 30 August 2024, Willis joined Scottish League One club Queen of the South on loan until January 2025. On 28 March 2025, he joined National League South side Maidstone United on loan for the remainder of the season.

Willis was released by Middlesbrough at the end of the 2024–25 season.

== Career statistics ==
As of end of 2024–25 season

Appearances and goals by club, season and competition
Club	Season	League			FA Cup		League Cup		Other		Total	
Club	Season	Division	Apps	Goals	Apps	Goals	Apps	Goals	Apps	Goals	Apps	Goals
Middlesbrough	2022–23	Championship	1	0	0	0	0	0	0	0	1	0
Middlesbrough	2023–24	Championship	0	0	0	0	0	0	—		0	0
Middlesbrough	2024–25	Championship	0	0	0	0	0	0	—		0	0
Middlesbrough	Total		1	0	0	0	0	0	0	0	1	0
Queen of the South (loan)	2024–25	Scottish League One	5	1	0	0	0	0	1 (Note: Appearance(s) in Scottish Challenge Cup)	0	6	1
Maidstone United (loan)	2024–25	National League South	6	0	0	0	—		0	0	6	0
Career total			12	1	0	0	0	0	1	0	13	1
