= Oscar MacIntyre =

Scottish footballer

Personal information
- Full name: Oscar Boyd MacIntyre
- Date of birth: 21 December 2004 (age 21)
- Height: 1.75 m (5 ft 9 in)
- Position: Left back

Youth career
- –2019: Spartans
- 2019–2022: Hibernian

Senior career*
Years	Team	Apps	(Gls)
2022–2025	Hibernian	3	(0)
2023–2024	→ Queen of the South (loan)	14	(0)
2024	→ Annan Athletic (loan)	11	(0)
2024–2025	→ Queen of the South (loan)	35	(0)
2025–2026	Inverness Caledonian Thistle	28	(0)
- * Club domestic league appearances and goals as of 13:39, 31 May 2026 (UTC)

Oscar MacIntyre (born 21 December 2004) is a Scottish professional footballer who most recently played as a left back for Inverness Caledonian Thistle. He has previously played for Hibernian, Queen of the South, and Annan Athletic.

== Club career ==
=== Hibernian ===
MacIntyre signed for the Hibernian youth academy from The Spartans in 2019, joining up at the same time as his younger brother Jacob. In April 2021, Oscar signed his first professional contract with Hibernian and debuted for the first-team in May 2022. Both brothers signed long-term contracts with the Hibees in August 2022.

On 25 August 2023, MacIntyre was sent out on loan to Queen of the South. In February 2024 he was loaned to Annan Athletic for the remainder of the 2023–24 season. He returned to Queen of the South on loan for the 2024–25 season.

=== Inverness Caledonian Thistle ===
MacIntyre moved to Inverness Caledonian Thistle on a permanent basis in July 2025.

On 25 May 2026 it was announced that MacIntyre was one of 9 players who would be leaving Inverness upon the expiration of his contract.

== Sports family ==
His younger brother Jacob MacIntyre is also a footballer, currently in the Hibernian youth academy. Both brothers are the first cousin of professional golfer Robert MacIntyre.

== Career statistics ==
As of 22 September 2023

Appearances and goals by club, season and competition
Club	Season	League			Scottish Cup		League Cup		Other		Total	
Club	Season	Division	Apps	Goals	Apps	Goals	Apps	Goals	Apps	Goals	Apps	Goals
Hibernian	2021–22	Scottish Premiership	1	0	0	0	0	0	0	0	1	0
Hibernian	2022–23	Scottish Premiership	2	0	0	0	0	0	0	0	2	0
Hibernian	Total		3	0	0	0	0	0	0	0	3	0
Queen of the South	2023-24	Scottish League One	3	0	0	0	0	0	0	0	3	0
Career total			6	0	0	0	0	0	0	0	6	0
