= Kyle McClelland =

Northern Ireland association football player

Personal information
- Full name: David Kyle McClelland
- Date of birth: 10 February 2002 (age 24)
- Place of birth: Glasgow, Scotland
- Height: 1.80 m (5 ft 11 in)
- Position: Defender

Youth career
- –2020: Rangers

Senior career*
Years	Team	Apps	(Gls)
2020–2022	Rangers	0	(0)
2020–2021	→ Falkirk (loan)	6	(0)
2022–2025	Hibernian	1	(0)
2022–2023	→ Cove Rangers (loan)	9	(0)
2023–2024	→ Queen of the South (loan)	31	(1)
2024–2025	→ Coleraine (loan)	35	(0)
2025–2026	Glenavon	16	(1)
2026	→ Cliftonville (loan)	2	(0)

International career
2019	Northern Ireland U-17	6	(0)
2023	Northern Ireland U-21	2	(0)
- * Club domestic league appearances and goals as of 29 April 2026

David Kyle McClelland (born 10 February 2002) is a professional footballer who plays as a defender and is currently a free agent. Born and raised in Scotland, he is a Northern Ireland youth international.

== Club career ==
=== Rangers ===
McClelland came through the youth ranks at Rangers, having joined the club at seven years-old. He spent time on loan at Scottish League One side Falkirk in 2021, making his debut against Clyde on 10 April 2021. He left Rangers in the summer of 2022 upon the conclusion of his contract despite being offered new terms by the Glasgow club.

=== Hibernian ===
McClelland signed a three-year contract with Hibernian in June 2022 in the hope of earning more first-team football opportunities. He made his debut for Hibernian in the Scottish Premiership away at Livingston on 13 August 2022.

McClelland had a spell on loan with Cove Rangers in the 2022-23 season, and he made his debut in a 2-2 draw with Partick Thistle on 17 September 2022. He was recalled from the loan spell in March 2023.

McClelland joined Queen of the South on loan for the 2023-24 season. He made his debut on 18 July 2023, against Motherwell in the Scottish League Cup.

He was released by Hibs in May 2025, at the end of his contract.

=== Glenavon ===
On 15 July 2025, it was announced that McClelland had signed for NIFL Premiership club Glenavon. He made his debut in a 2-0 defeat to Ballymena United.

== International career ==
Having previously featured at under-17 level, McClelland earned his first call-up to the Northern Ireland national under-21 football team in May 2021.
