= Ben Wilson (footballer, born 2001) =

Northern Irish footballer

Personal information
- Full name: Benjamin John Wilson
- Date of birth: 5 December 2001 (age 24)
- Place of birth: Derry, Northern Ireland
- Position: Forward

Team information
- Current team: The New Saints
- Number: 28

Youth career
- Coleraine
- 2018–2023: Brighton & Hove Albion

Senior career*
Years	Team	Apps	(Gls)
2023–2024	Cliftonville	34	(18)
2024–2025	Airdrieonians	32	(9)
2025–	The New Saints	25	(12)

International career^{‡}
2017	Northern Ireland U17	2	(1)
2019	Northern Ireland U19	2	(0)
- * Club domestic league appearances and goals as of 06:17, 16 September 2026 (UTC) ‡ National team caps and goals as of 10 October 2023

Ben Wilson (born 5 December 2001) is a footballer who plays as a forward for Cymru Premier side The New Saints.

== Club career ==
=== Brighton & Hove Albion ===
Wilson began his youth career at Coleraine. Wilson joined English club Brighton & Hove Albion in July 2018. He made regular appearances in the club's under-23 side. In 2020, Wilson scored a two goals in a 3–2 defeat against Leyton Orient in the EFL Trophy. Wilson left the club following the expiry of his contract in 2023.

=== Cliftonville ===
Following his departure from Brighton, Wilson joined Cliftonville. On 12 August 2023, Wilson made his league debut for Cliftonville against Glenavon. He scored his first league goal three days later against Newry City.

=== Airdrieonians ===
Having scored 18 league goals in his first season of senior football, Wilson departed Cliftonville at the end of his contract and joined Scottish Championship side Airdrieonians on 27 June 2024. He made his Airdrieonians debut on 16 July in a Scottish League Cup match against East Kilbride and scored a hat-trick in an 8–0 win. In his second game, he scored the fourth goal in a 4–3 comeback win for Airdrieonians over Dumbarton.

=== The New Saints ===
In June 2025 he moved to The New Saints, joining the Cymru Premier team for a club record transfer fee.

== International career ==
In 2017, Wilson was capped twice for Northern Ireland Under 17s, scoring one goal. He made two appearances for Northern Ireland's Under-19 team in 2019.

== Career statistics ==
As of match played 16 July 2024

Club	Season	League			National cup (Note: Includes Irish Cup)		League cup (Note: Includes Irish League Cup, Scottish League Cup)		Other		Total	
Club	Season	Division	Apps	Goals	Apps	Goals	Apps	Goals	Apps	Goals	Apps	Goals
Cliftonville	2023–24	NIFL Premiership	34	18	2	0	2	1	2 (Note: Appearances in Scottish Challenge Cup)	1	40	20
Airdrieonians	2024–25	Scottish Championship	2	0	0	0	4	6	0	0	6	6
Career total			36	18	2	0	6	7	2	1	46	26

== Honours ==
Cliftonville

- Irish Cup: 2023–24
