= Adam Brooks (footballer) =

Scottish footballer

Personal information
- Date of birth: 9 February 2004 (age 22)
- Place of birth: Bonhill, Scotland
- Position: Forward

Team information
- Current team: Crusaders
- Number: 9

Youth career
- –2013: Dumbarton United
- 2013–2022: Celtic

Senior career*
Years	Team	Apps	(Gls)
2022–2023	Celtic B	19	(13)
2023–2024	Inverness Caledonian Thistle	27	(1)
2024–2025	Queen Of the South	23	(10)
2025–	Crusaders	37	(7)
- * Club domestic league appearances and goals as of 26 April 2026

Adam Brooks (born 9 February 2004) is a Scottish professional footballer who played as a striker for NIFL Premiership club Crusaders

== Career ==
Born in Bonhill, Brooks started his youth career with Dumbarton United, before being scouted by Celtic's Youth Academy, where he rose through the ranks before joining the 'B' Team in the Scottish Lowland League, where he scored 13 goals in 19 appearances as Celtic narrowly missed out on the title with a 3rd-place finish behind Spartans and Rangers 'B', respectively.

In July 2023, Brooks got his first senior move, moving to Inverness Caledonian Thistle in the Scottish Championship, making his debut less than a week later in a 2–1 League Cup win over Bonnyrigg Rose. On 24 October 2024, Brooks had his contract terminated as Inverness slipped into administration. Following this, he was picked up by fellow League One side, Queen of the South.

On 6 July 2025, Brooks left Queen of the South and joined Northern Irish Premiership side, Crusaders, on a two year deal.
