= 2023–24 Highland Football League =

Breedon Highland League
- Season: 2023–24
- Dates: 29 July 2023 – 27 April 2024
- Champions: Buckie Thistle
- Matches: 306
- Goals: 1,124 (3.67 per match)
- Biggest home win: Fraserburgh 11–0 Strathspey Thistle (20 April 2024)
- Biggest away win: Strathspey Thistle 1–10 Brora Rangers (6 March 2024)
- Highest scoring: Strathspey Thistle 1–10 Brora Rangers (6 March 2024); Fraserburgh 11–0 Strathspey Thistle (20 April 2024)
- Longest winning run: 10 matches: Brechin City & Fraserburgh
- Longest unbeaten run: 19 matches: Banks o' Dee
- Longest winless run: 16 matches: Clachnacuddin & Strathspey Thistle
- Longest losing run: 14 matches: Strathspey Thistle
- All statistics correct as of 27 April 2024.

The 2023–24 Highland Football League (known as the Breedon Highland League for sponsorship reasons) was the 121st season of the Highland Football League, and the 10th season as part of the fifth tier of the Scottish football pyramid system. Brechin City were the reigning champions, and were one of three teams that could have won the title in the final round of games, along with Buckie Thistle and Fraserburgh.

Buckie Thistle's 1–0 win – a sixth consecutive win to finish the season – over Keith gave them their 12th Highland League title on goal difference from Brechin City, with Fraserburgh three points behind in third, having won their last ten games.

However, Buckie Thistle were not eligible for the pyramid play-off (they would have played the winners of the 2023–24 Lowland Football League (East Kilbride)) as they did not hold a bronze-level club licence.

== Teams ==
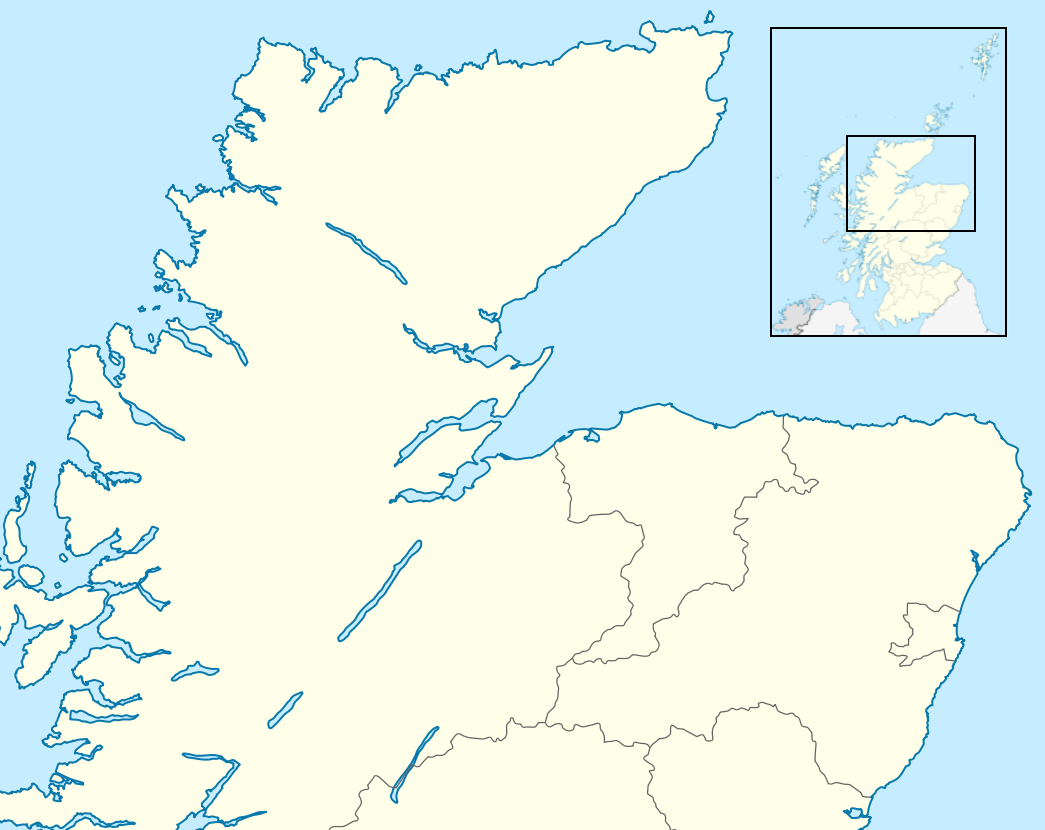
Location of teams in 2023-24 Highland Football League

=== Stadia and locations ===
All grounds are equipped with floodlights as required by league regulations.

Team	Location	Stadium	Capacity	Seats
Banks o' Dee	Aberdeen	Spain Park	876	122
Brechin City	Brechin	Glebe Park	4,083	1,519
Brora Rangers	Brora	Dudgeon Park	2,000	250
Buckie Thistle	Buckie	Victoria Park	3,000	400
Clachnacuddin	Inverness	Grant Street Park	2,074	154
Deveronvale	Banff	Princess Royal Park	2,651	360
Formartine United	Pitmedden	North Lodge Park	1,800	300
Forres Mechanics	Forres	Mosset Park	2,700	502
Fraserburgh	Fraserburgh	Bellslea Park	1,865	480
Huntly	Huntly	Christie Park	2,200	270
Inverurie Loco Works	Inverurie	Harlaw Park	2,500	250
Keith	Keith	Kynoch Park	2,362	370
Lossiemouth	Lossiemouth	Grant Park	2,050	250
Nairn County	Nairn	Station Park	2,250	250
Rothes	Rothes	Mackessack Park	1,731	167
Strathspey Thistle	Grantown-on-Spey	Seafield Park	1,600	150
Turriff United	Turriff	The Haughs	2,135	135
Wick Academy	Wick	Harmsworth Park	2,412	300

== League table ==
Pos	Team	Pld	W	D	L	GF	GA	GD	Pts	Qualification or relegation
1	Buckie Thistle (C)	34	26	3	5	98	34	+64	81	Ineligible for the Pyramid play-off
2	Brechin City	34	26	3	5	90	28	+62	81	
3	Fraserburgh	34	25	3	6	102	37	+65	78	
4	Banks o' Dee	34	21	9	4	87	33	+54	72	
5	Formartine United	34	22	6	6	87	43	+44	72	
6	Brora Rangers	34	17	8	9	64	46	+18	59	
7	Huntly	34	16	6	12	81	61	+20	54	
8	Nairn County	34	16	5	13	59	58	+1	53	
9	Turriff United	34	15	3	16	75	63	+12	48	
10	Inverurie Loco Works	34	13	5	16	52	58	−6	44	
11	Rothes	34	10	7	17	47	71	−24	37	
12	Wick Academy	34	10	6	18	49	70	−21	36	
13	Keith	34	9	6	19	35	61	−26	33	
14	Forres Mechanics	34	7	9	18	37	64	−27	30	
15	Lossiemouth	34	7	8	19	36	66	−30	29	
16	Deveronvale	34	5	10	19	43	91	−48	25	
17	Clachnacuddin	34	5	8	21	47	89	−42	23	
18	Strathspey Thistle	34	3	1	30	35	151	−116	10	

Rules for classification: 1) Points; 2) Goal difference; 3) Number of goals scored
(C) Champions

== Results ==
Home \ Away	BAN	BRE	BRO	BUC	CLA	DEV	FOU	FOM	FRA	HUN	INV	KEI	LOS	NAI	RTH	STR	TUR	WIC
Banks o' Dee		0–1	2–2	2–0	2–2	4–1	2–1	4–0	2–0	2–1	3–0	2–0	1–1	3–0	4–0	4–1	3–2	4–0
Brechin City	0–0		2–1	2–3	6–0	5–1	1–0	6–1	0–1	5–0	2–1	3–1	2–0	2–0	3–1	5–0	5–1	3–1
Brora Rangers	1–2	1–2 (Note: Match played at King George V Park, Golspie.)		1–5	1–0	3–3 (Note: Match played at King George V Park, Golspie, due to an unplayable pitch at Dudgeon Park.)	1–4	3–2	1–2	3–0	1–1	4–1 (Note: Match played at King George V Park, Golspie, due to an unplayable pitch at Dudgeon Park.)	3–2 (Note: Match played at King George V Park, Golspie.)	2–1	1–0	3–1	4–2 (Note: Match played at King George V Park, Golspie.)	1–0 (Note: Match played at King George V Park, Golspie.)
Buckie Thistle	2–1	2–1	2–0 (Note: Match played at Grant Park, Lossiemouth, due to an unplayable pitch at Victoria Park.)		2–3	6–1	2–0	3–1	1–0 (Note: Match played at Grant Park, Lossiemouth.)	3–0	1–1	1–0	3–0	6–0	3–1 (Note: Match played at Princess Royal Park, Banff.)	6–1	4–0	5–2
Clachnacuddin	1–0	0–2	0–2	2–3		2–2	0–5	1–4	2–6	2–4	2–4	3–1	2–0	0–1	0–1	4–4	1–5	8–0
Deveronvale	3–3	0–4	0–3	0–0	0–0		0–3	1–1	2–4	0–6	2–1	1–0	3–1	1–3	2–2	0–3	0–1	0–0
Formartine United	1–4	4–3	3–3	1–1	3–0	5–0		2–0	2–2	2–1	1–1	6–2	2–2	5–1	6–1	4–0	2–4	3–1
Forres Mechanics	2–2	1–1	0–1	1–8	1–1	0–2	0–4		1–2	2–2	0–1	2–1	1–1	0–0	0–1	2–1	1–0	3–1
Fraserburgh	2–1	4–2	2–0	1–3	2–2	3–2	1–2	2–1		6–0	4–2	3–0	3–1	3–0	5–0	11–0	3–0	3–0
Huntly	1–3	2–2	1–0	2–3	8–0	5–1	0–1	3–0	4–1		1–2	1–1	2–1	0–0	4–4	7–0	4–2	2–1
Inverurie Loco Works	0–2	0–2	2–2	0–2	1–0	3–0	1–2	1–0	0–7	2–3		1–2	1–1	6–0	0–1	5–0	1–4	3–1
Keith	1–3	0–1	0–1	0–3	1–1	3–2	2–3	1–1	2–2	1–0	1–2		1–0	1–1	2–1	3–1	1–0	0–4
Lossiemouth	1–6	0–3	1–1	2–1	5–3	3–3	1–2	0–3	0–1	1–3	0–1	1–0		1–4	3–1	2–1	0–0	1–0
Nairn County	3–3	0–1	0–1	3–0	1–1	4–2	0–2	2–1	0–3	2–4	4–0	3–2	5–1		0–2	4–1	2–1	2–0
Rothes	2–2	0–2	0–1	1–3	3–2	2–1	2–2	1–1	0–3	1–4	1–4	0–0	1–0	0–3		8–2	1–3	3–0
Strathspey Thistle	0–6	1–6	1–10	0–7	2–1	5–2	0–1	0–2	1–5	1–4	0–2	1–2	0–3	0–4	2–4		1–8	1–6
Turriff United	0–4	0–3	2–2	1–3	4–1	1–3	1–2	2–0	3–2	4–0	4–1	1–2	0–0	1–3	3–1	7–1		3–1
Wick Academy	1–1	1–2	0–0	3–1	3–0	2–2	3–1	3–2	0–3	2–2	2–1	2–0	3–0	2–3	0–0	3–2	1–5	

Legend: Blue = home team win; Yellow = draw; Red = away team win.

== Highland League play-off ==
Subject to the tier 6 champion clubs meeting the required licensing criteria for promotion, a play-off was scheduled to take place between the winners of the 2023–24 Midlands Football League (Dundee North End), 2023–24 North Caledonian Football League (Invergordon) and the 2023–24 North Region Junior Football League (Culter), with the winners then playing Strathspey Thistle, who finished bottom of the Highland League. However, none of the tier 6 champions had the required SFA licence and as such there was no promotion to, or relegation from, the Highland League.
