= Kieran McKechnie =

Scottish association football player

Personal information
- Date of birth: 4 April 2001 (age 25)
- Place of birth: Glasgow, Scotland
- Height: 1.73 m (5 ft 8 in)
- Position: Midfielder

Team information
- Current team: Crusaders
- Number: 7

Youth career
- –2020: Rangers

Senior career*
Years	Team	Apps	(Gls)
2020–2025	Queen of the South	74	(6)
2025	Arbroath	8	(0)
2025–	Crusaders	11	(1)
- * Club domestic league appearances and goals as of 26 April 2026

Kieran McKechnie (born 4 April 2001) is a Scottish professional footballer who plays as a midfielder for NIFL Premiership club Crusaders.

== Career ==
McKechnie spent eleven years as a youth player at Rangers, before signing a one-year contract with Queen of the South in the summer of 2020.

McKechnie debuted for Queen of the South in the Scottish Championship on the 7 November 2020 versus Arbroath in a 1-1 draw. A knee injury caused him to have surgery in March 2021, which kept him out of action until April 2022. McKechnie scored his first league goal for the club on 4 March 2023 against Airdrieonians in a 3-2 victory.

McKechnie started the 2023-24 season, with goals in his first two games versus Scottish Premiership club Motherwell in the Scottish League Cup, then again the following week versus Elgin City.

McKechnie moved to Arbroath in January 2025 before signing for NIFL Premiership club Crusaders in May 2025.
