= 2022 Scottish Challenge Cup final =

- Event: 2021–22 Scottish Challenge Cup
Raith Rovers	Queen of the South
3	1
- Date: 3 April 2022
- Venue: Excelsior Stadium, Airdrie
- Referee: Grant Irvine
- Attendance: 4,452

The 2022 Scottish Challenge Cup final, also known as the SPFL Trust Trophy final for sponsorship reasons, was a football match that took place on 3 April 2022 between Raith Rovers and Queen of the South. It was the 29th final of the Scottish Challenge Cup since it was first organised in 1990 to celebrate the centenary of the now defunct Scottish Football League, and the seventh since the SPFL was formed. It was the first final played since 2019, as the 2020 final and the 2020–21 competition were cancelled due to the COVID-19 pandemic.

== Route to the final ==
The competition is a knock-out tournament and was contested by 50 teams from Scotland in 2021–22. In previous years clubs from England, Wales, Northern Ireland and the Republic of Ireland have competed, but the competition was restricted to Scottish clubs in 2021–22 to reduce unnecessary travel during the COVID-19 pandemic.

=== Raith Rovers ===
As a 2020–21 Scottish Championship club, Raith Rovers were given a bye to the second round.

Round	Opposition	Score
Second round	Forfar Athletic (h)	1–0
Third round	East Fife (h)	3–1
Quarter-final	Inverness Caledonian Thistle (a)	0–0 (a.e.t.); 5–4 (p)
Semi-final	Kilmarnock (a)	2–1

=== Queen of the South ===
As a 2020–21 Scottish Championship club, Queen of the South were given a bye to the second round.

Round	Opposition	Score
Second round	Broomhill (h)	3–0
Third round	Partick Thistle (h)	2–0
Quarter-final	Greenock Morton (h)	2–1
Semi-final	Cove Rangers (a)	1–0

== Match details ==
3 April 2022
16:15 GMT
Final

Raith Rovers	3–1	Queen of the South
Poplatnik 16', 70'; Ross 78'	Report	Roy 45+3'

Excelsior Stadium, Airdrie
Attendance: 4,452
Referee: Grant Irvine

Raith Rovers	Queen of the South

GK	1	(Scotland) Jamie MacDonald
RB	2	(Scotland) Reghan Tumilty (yellow card)
CB	4	(Zambia) Frankie Musonda
CB	3	(Scotland) Liam Dick (substituted off) 83'
LB	21	(Scotland) Sean Mackie
RM	7	(Scotland) Aidan Connolly
CM	16	(Scotland) Sam Stanton
CM	8	(Scotland) Ross Matthews
LM	22	(Scotland) Ethan Ross (substituted off) 87'
FW	99	(Slovenia) Matej Poplatnik (yellow card)
FW	18	(Republic of Ireland) Ethon Varian (yellow card) (substituted off) 56'
Substitutes:
GK	17	(Scotland) Robbie Thomson
DF	5	(Scotland) Christophe Berra
DF	14	(Scotland) David McKay (substituted in) 83'
DF	29	(Scotland) Greig Young
MF	13	(Scotland) Brad Spencer
MF	25	(Scotland) Aaron Arnott (substituted in) 87'
FW	10	(Scotland) Lewis Vaughan
FW	11	(Canada) Dario Zanatta (substituted in) 56'
Manager:
(Scotland) John McGlynn

- Man of the match: Matej Poplatnik

GK	1	(Scotland) Josh Rae
RB	3	(Scotland) Alex Cooper
CB	16	(Scotland) Euan East
CB	2	(Republic of Ireland) Darragh O'Connor
LB	33	(Scotland) Willie Gibson
RM	8	(England) Josh Todd
CM	6	(Scotland) Harry Cochrane
CM	15	(Scotland) Calvin McGrory
LM	10	(Scotland) Lee Connelly (substituted off) 81'
FW	9	(Northern Ireland) Ally Roy
FW	7	(Republic of Ireland) Ruari Paton (substituted off) 81'
Substitutes:
GK	30	(Scotland) Charlie Cowie
DF	13	(Nigeria) Josh Debayo
DF	20	(England) Roberto Nditi
DF	29	(Scotland) Matthew Henderson
MF	14	(England) Ben Liddle
MF	18	(Scotland) Kieran McKechnie (substituted in) 81'
FW	17	(Scotland) Niyah Joseph
FW	44	(Portugal) Rúben Soares Júnior (substituted in) 81'
Manager:
(Scotland) Willie Gibson

Match rules

- 90 minutes.
- 30 minutes of extra-time if necessary.
- Penalty shoot-out if scores still level.
