= 2021–22 Queen of the South F.C. season =

Queen of the South
2021–22 season
- Chairman: Billy Hewitson
- Manager: Allan Johnston; Willie Gibson
- Stadium: Palmerston Park
- Scottish Championship: 10th (relegated)
- Scottish Cup: Third round
- League Cup: Group stages
- Challenge Cup: Runners-up
- Top goalscorer: League: Lee Connelly (7); All: Ally Roy (12)
- Highest home attendance: 2,271 vs. Ayr United, 23 April 2022
- Lowest home attendance: 437 vs. Hamilton Academical, 2 January 2022
- Average home league attendance: 1,083
Home colours	Away colours	Third colours

The 2021–22 season is Queen of the South's ninth consecutive season in the second tier of Scottish football, the Scottish Championship, having been promoted as champions from the Scottish Second Division at the end of the 2012–13 season. Queens are also competing in the Challenge Cup, League Cup and the Scottish Cup.

== Summary ==
Queens finished tenth in the Scottish Championship and were relegated to Scottish League One, ending nine straight seasons in Scottish Football's second tier.

Queens reached the 2022 Scottish Challenge Cup Final, ending runners-up to Raith Rovers, losing 3-1 at the Excelsior Stadium, Airdrie.

The Doonhamers were knocked out after the first round of the League Cup after the completion of fixtures in Group F that included Airdrieonians, Annan Athletic, Motherwell and Queen's Park.

Queens reached the third round of the Scottish Cup, losing 3-0 at Palmerston to Cove Rangers in a replay, after a 2-2 draw at the Balmoral Stadium.

== Results and fixtures ==
Win Draw Loss Abandoned or Postponed

=== Preseason ===
26 June 2021 Friendly	Queen of the South	2–3	Annan Athletic	Palmerston Park
13:00	Roy 10'; Soares-Junior 20'	QOSFC Report; Black & Golds Photos	Anderson 55'; A. Smith 65' (pen.); Cairnie 75'	Attendance: Closed doors

29 June 2021 Friendly	East Fife	0–3	Queen of the South	Bayview Stadium
19:45		QOSFC Report; Fifers Photos	Broadfoot 32'; Todd 42'; Connelly 48'	Attendance: Closed doors

3 July 2021 Friendly	Queen of the South	2–1	Stranraer	Palmerston Park
14:00	Joseph 16'; Connelly 44'	QOSFC Report; Blues Photos	Moore 41'	Attendance: Closed doors

=== Scottish Championship ===
31 July 2021 Match 1	Partick Thistle	3–2	Queen of the South	Firhill Stadium
15:00	Graham 16', 30'; Tiffoney 85'	QOSFC Report; BBC Sport Report; Harry Wraggs Photos	Gibson 10'; Paton 74'	Attendance: 1,534; Referee: Aitken; Man of the Match: Gibson

7 August 2021 Match 2	Queen of the South	0–1	Kilmarnock	Palmerston Park
15:00		QOSFC Report; BBC Sport Report; Killie Photos	Naismith 90+1'	Attendance: 1,195; Referee: Newlands; Man of the Match: Debayo

21 August 2021 Match 3	Greenock Morton	2–3	Queen of the South	Cappielow Park
15:00	Jacobs 31'; Brynn 83' (o.g.)	QOSFC Report; BBC Sport Report; Ton Photos	Roy 24'; Jacobs 55' (o.g.); Soares-Junior 72'	Attendance: 1,429; Referee: Lambie; Man of the Match: Gibson

28 August 2021 Match 4	Queen of the South	1–2	Hamilton Academical	Palmerston Park
15:00	Paton 54'	QOSFC Report; BBC Sport Report; Accies Photos	Ryan 46'; Smith 74'	Attendance: 1,232; Referee: Duncan; Man of the Match: Paton

11 September 2021 Match 5	Raith Rovers	0–1	Queen of the South	Stark's Park
15:00		QOSFC Report; BBC Sport Report; Rovers Photos	Connelly 12'	Attendance: 1,640; Referee: Napier; Man of the Match: Soares-Junior

18 September 2021 Match 6	Queen of the South	0–2	Arbroath	Palmerston Park
15:00		QOSFC Report; BBC Sport Report; Red Lichties Photos	O'Brien 16'; Gold (red card) 57'; Nouble 79'	Attendance: 1,174; Referee: Walsh; Man of the Match: East

25 September 2021 Match 7	Inverness Caledonian Thistle	2–1	Queen of the South	Caledonian Stadium
15:00	Welsh 12'; Gardyne 81'	QOSFC Report; BBC Sport Report; Caley Jags Photos	Connelly 74'	Attendance: 1,184; Referee: Newlands; Man of the Match: Connelly

2 October 2021 Match 8	Queen of the South	1–0	Dunfermline Athletic	Palmerston Park
15:00	Connelly 85'	QOSFC Report; BBC Sport Report; Pars Photos		Attendance: 1,071; Referee: McLean; Man of the Match: Connelly

16 October 2021 Match 9	Ayr United	2–1	Queen of the South	Somerset Park
15:00	Muirhead 73' (pen.); Maxwell 79'	QOSFC Report; BBC Sport Report; Honest Men Photos	Connelly 68'	Attendance: 1,663; Referee: Dickinson; Man of the Match: Gibson

23 October 2021 Match 10	Queen of the South	0–0	Greenock Morton	Palmerston Park
15:00		QOSFC Report; BBC Sport Report; Ton Photos		Attendance: 1,093; Referee: Dallas; Man of the Match: Connelly

26 October 2021 Match 11	Hamilton Academical	1–0	Queen of the South	New Douglas Park
19:45	Ryan 76'	QOSFC Report; BBC Sport Report; Accies Photos		Attendance: 942; Referee: Duncan; Man of the Match: Johnston

30 October 2021 Match 12	Kilmarnock	4–0	Queen of the South	Rugby Park
15:00	Shaw 17', 59'; Hendry 90'; Burke 90+2'	QOSFC Report; BBC Sport Report; Killie Photos		Attendance: 3,992; Referee: D Robertson; Man of the Match: Gibson

6 November 2021 Match 13	Queen of the South	1–1	Raith Rovers	Palmerston Park
15:00	Johnston 49'	QOSFC Report; BBC Sport Report; Rovers Photos	Connolly 72'	Attendance: 964; Referee: Clancy; Man of the Match: Johnston

13 November 2021 Match 14	Arbroath	1-1	Queen of the South	Gayfield Park
15:00	McKenna 67'	QOSFC Report; BBC Sport Report; Red Lichties Photos	Cameron 55'	Attendance: 1,408; Referee: Steven; Man of the Match: Brynn

19 November 2021 Match 15	Queen of the South	1-2	Inverness Caledonian Thistle	Palmerston Park
19:45	Connelly 75'	QOSFC Report; BBC Sport Report; Caley Jags Photos	Mckay 19' (pen.), 50'	Attendance: 941; Referee: D Robertson; Man of the Match: Connelly

4 December 2021 Match 16	Queen of the South	0-0	Partick Thistle	Palmerston Park
15:00		QOSFC Report; BBC Sport Report; Harry Wraggs Photos		Attendance: 1,308; Referee: Duncan; Man of the Match: McKay

11 December 2021 Match 17	Dunfermline Athletic	3-3	Queen of the South	East End Park
15:00	Kennedy 21'; Connolly 54'; McCann 88'	DAFC Report; BBC Sport Report; Pars Photos	Cooper 3'; Connelly 48'; Cameron 65'	Attendance: 3,425; Referee: D Robertson; Man of the Match: East

18 December 2021 Match 18	Queen of the South	3-0	Ayr United	Palmerston Park
15:00	East 9'; Cameron 29'; Todd 48'	QOSFC Report; BBC Sport Report; Honest Men Photos		Attendance: 997; Referee: Munro; Man of the Match: Todd

2 January 2022 Match 19	Queen of the South	0-3	Hamilton Academical	Palmerston Park
15:00	Gibson (yellow card) 20' (yellow-red card) 21'	QOSFC Report; BBC Sport Report; Accies Photos	Moyo 20'; Hamilton 70'; Mullin 77'	Attendance: 437; Referee: Cook; Man of the Match: Rae

8 January 2022 Match 20	Queen of the South	0-2	Kilmarnock	Palmerston Park
15:00		QOSFC Report; BBC Sport Report; Killie Photos	Stokes 43'; Shaw 71' (pen.)	Attendance: 492; Referee: Steven; Man of the Match: Todd

15 January 2022 Match 21	Inverness Caledonian Thistle	2-2	Queen of the South	Caledonian Stadium
15:00	Mckay 62'; Walsh 73'	QOSFC Report; BBC Sport Report; Caley Jags Photos	Connelly 39'; Roy 77'	Attendance: 479; Referee: Collum; Man of the Match: McGrory

29 January 2022 Match 22	Queen of the South	0-2	Dunfermline Athletic	Palmerston Park
15:00		QOSFC Report; BBC Sport Report; Pars Photos	Dorrans 22'; Pybus 29'	Attendance: 1,222; Referee: Aitken; Man of the Match: Gibson

1 February 2022 Match 23	Raith Rovers	3-3	Queen of the South	Stark's Park
19:45	Zanatta 9'; Connolly 13'; Poplatnik 83'	QOSFAN Report; BBC Sport Report; Rovers Photos	Liddle 17'; Cooper 48'; Gordon 85'	Attendance: 1,005; Referee: Irvine; Man of the Match: Gordon

12 February 2022 Match 24	Greenock Morton	2-1	Queen of the South	Cappielow Park
15:00	Reilly 80'; Blues 81'	QOSFAN Report; BBC Sport Report; Ton Photos	East 59'	Attendance: 1,445; Referee: Roncone; Man of the Match: Gibson

19 February 2022 Match 25	Queen of the South	0-0	Arbroath	Palmerston Park
15:00		QOSFAN Report; BBC Sport Report; Red Lichties Photos		Attendance: 1,067; Referee: D Robertson; Man of the Match: Cameron

26 February 2022 Match 26	Ayr United	0-1	Queen of the South	Somerset Park
15:00		QOSFAN Report; BBC Sport Report; Honest Men Photos	Fitzpatrick 32'	Attendance: 1,875; Referee: McLean; Man of the Match: Gibson

5 March 2022 Match 27	Queen of the South	3-0	Greenock Morton	Palmerston Park
15:00	Johnston 19'; Fitzpatrick 31'; Paton 52' (pen.)	QOSFAN Report; BBC Sport Report; Ton Photos		Attendance: 1,217; Referee: Irvine; Man of the Match: Johnston

8 March 2022 Match 28	Partick Thistle	1-0	Queen of the South	Firhill Stadium
19:45	Holt 82' (pen.)	QOSFAN Report; BBC Sport Report; Harry Wraggs Photos		Attendance: 2,044; Referee: Walsh; Man of the Match: Rae

12 March 2022 Match 29	Queen of the South	0-1	Raith Rovers	Palmerston Park
15:00		QOSFAN Report; BBC Sport Report; Rovers Photos	Poplatnik 21'	Attendance: 1,091; Referee: Dickinson; Man of the Match: O'Connor

19 March 2022 Match 30	Kilmarnock	2-1	Queen of the South	Rugby Park
15:00	Taylor 42'; Shaw 81'	QOSFAN Report; BBC Sport Report; Killie Photos	Roy 66'	Attendance: 4,074; Referee: Duncan; Man of the Match: Rae

26 March 2022 Match 31	Hamilton Academical	1-0	Queen of the South	New Douglas Park
15:00	Winter 65'	QOSFAN Report; BBC Sport Report; Accies Photos	Liddle (yellow card) 11' (yellow-red card) 40'	Attendance: 1,214; Referee: Grainger; Man of the Match: Gibson

8 April 2022 Match 32	Queen of the South	0-1	Partick Thistle	Palmerston Park
19:45		QOSFAN Report; BBC Sport Report; Harry Wraggs Photos	Tiffoney 62'	Attendance: 1,099; Referee: Clancy; Man of the Match: East

16 April 2022 Match 33	Arbroath	5-1	Queen of the South	Gayfield Park
15:00	C. Hamilton 25'; J. Hamilton 37', 59'; Cameron 54' (o.g.); Craigen 90'	QOSFAN Report; BBC Sport Report; Red Lichties Photos	Roy 12'	Attendance: 2,413; Referee: Anderson; Man of the Match: McGrory

19 April 2022 Match 34	Queen of the South	2-1	Inverness Caledonian Thistle	Palmerston Park
19:45	Todd 6'; East 40'	QOSFAN Report; BBC Sport Report; Caley Jags Photos	Chalmers 17'	Attendance: 631; Referee: McDermid; Man of the Match: East

23 April 2022 Match 35	Queen of the South	1-1	Ayr United	Palmerston Park
15:00	East 80'	QOSFAN Report; BBC Sport Report; Honest Men Photos	East 87' (o.g.)	Attendance: 2,271; Referee: Collum; Man of the Match: O'Connor

29 April 2022 Match 36	Dunfermline Athletic	1-2	Queen of the South	East End Park
19:45	Edwards 6'	QOSFAN Report; BBC Sport Report; Pars Photos	Chalmers 51' (o.g.); O'Connor 71'	Attendance: 5,406; Referee: Munro; Man of the Match: O'Connor

=== Scottish League Cup ===
10 July 2021 Round 1;Group F-1	Queen of the South	0–1	Queen's Park	Palmerston Park
15:00		QOSFAN Report; BBC Sport Report; Spiders Photos	Biggar 54'	Attendance: 500; Referee: Beaton; Man of the Match: Soares-Junior

13 July 2021 Round 1;Group F-2	Annan Athletic	1–3	Queen of the South	Galabank
19:45	K. Fleming 74'	QOSFAN Report; BBC Sport Report; Black & Golds Photos	Paton 29'; Roy 49', 84'	Attendance: 300; Referee: Roncone; Man of the Match: Roy

17 July 2021 Round 1;Group F-3	Motherwell	3–2	Queen of the South	Fir Park
15:00	Watt 49'; Lamie 72'; Woolery 75'	QOSFAN Report; BBC Sport Report; Steelmen Photos	Paton 40'; Roy 45+1'	Attendance: 2,000; Referee: Anderson; Man of the Match: Paton

24 July 2021 Round 1;Group F-4	Queen of the South	4–1	Airdrieonians	Palmerston Park
15:00	Roy 23', 35', 58'; Soares-Junior 55'	QOSFAN Report; BBC Sport Report; Diamonds Photos	McGill 90+1'	Attendance: 300; Referee: Scott; Man of the Match: Roy

=== Scottish Challenge Cup ===
5 September 2021 Round 2	Queen of the South	3–0	Broomhill	Palmerston Park
14:00	Paton 7' (pen.); Connelly 62'; Gibson 78' (pen.)	QOSFAN Report; BBC Sport Report; BSC Photos		Attendance: 717; Referee: Stuart; Man of the Match: Johnston

8 October 2021 Round 3	Queen of the South	2–0	Partick Thistle	Palmerston Park
19:45	Connelly 69'; Roy 90+2'	QOSFAN Report; BBC Sport Report; Harry Wraggs Photos		Attendance: 1,043; Referee: Newlands; Man of the Match: Connelly

1 December 2021 Round 4	Queen of the South	2-1	Greenock Morton	Palmerston Park
19:30	Johnston 28'; Paton 88'	QOSFAN Report; BBC Sport Report; Ton Photos	Lithgow 86'	Attendance: 525; Referee: Newlands; Man of the Match: Gibson

1 March 2022 Round 5	Cove Rangers	0-1	Queen of the South	Balmoral Stadium
19:30		QOSFAN Report; BBC Sport Report; Toonsers Photos	Fitzpatrick 2'	Attendance: 728; Referee: Dickinson; Man of the Match: Rae

3 April 2022 Final	Raith Rovers	3-1	Queen of the South	Excelsior Stadium
16:15	Poplatnik 16', 70'; Ross 78'	QOSFAN Report; BBC Sport Report; Rovers Photos	Roy 45+3'	Attendance: 4,452; Referee: Irvine; Man of the Match: O'Connor

=== Scottish Cup ===
27 November 2021 Round 3	Cove Rangers	2-2	Queen of the South	Balmoral Stadium
15:00	Vigurs 33'; McAllister 90+1'	QOSFAN Report; BBC Sport Report; Toonsers Photos	Soares-Junior 32'; Paton 72'; Nditi (red card) 82'	Attendance: 468; Referee: Lambie; Man of the Match: Brynn

7 December 2021 Round 3 replay	Queen of the South	0-3	Cove Rangers	Palmerston Park
19:45		QOSFAN Report; BBC Sport Report; Toonsers Photos	Fyvie 38'; Megginson 80', 83'	Attendance: 527; Referee: Lambie; Man of the Match: Brynn

== Player statistics ==
=== Captains ===
No.	P	Name	Country	No. games	Notes
33	DF	Willie Gibson	(Scotland)	33	Club Captain
8	MF	Josh Todd	(England)	12	Club Captain
16	DF	Euan East	(Scotland)	2	Vice Captain

Last updated: 30 April 2022
Source: Competitive match reports.
Competitive matches only
Matches started as captain only
Country: FIFA nationality; No.: Squad number; P: Position; Name: Player name; No. Games: Number of games started as captain.

=== Squad ===
As of 30 April 2022

No.	Pos	Nat	Player	Total		Scottish Championship		Challenge Cup		League Cup		Scottish Cup	
No.	Pos	Nat	Player	Apps	Goals	Apps	Goals	Apps	Goals	Apps	Goals	Apps	Goals
1	GK	(Scotland) SCO	Josh Rae	26	0	20+0	0	2+0	0	4+0	0	0+0	0
2	DF	(Republic of Ireland) IRL	Darragh O'Connor	17	1	15+0	1	2+0	0	0+0	0	0+0	0
3	DF	(Scotland) SCO	Alex Cooper	27	2	18+2	2	3+1	0	1+0	0	2+0	0
4	DF	(Nigeria) NGR	Udoka Chima	1	0	0+1	0	0+0	0	0+0	0	0+0	0
5	DF	(Scotland) SCO	Paul McKay	22	0	16+0	0	3+0	0	0+1	0	2+0	0
6	MF	(Scotland) SCO	Harry Cochrane	26	0	14+7	0	3+1	0	0+0	0	1+0	0
7	FW	(Republic of Ireland) IRL	Ruari Paton	45	8	23+11	3	4+1	2	4+0	2	1+1	1
8	MF	(England) ENG	Josh Todd	34	2	21+4	2	4+0	0	3+0	0	1+1	0
9	FW	(Northern Ireland) NIR	Ally Roy	36	12	12+14	4	2+2	2	3+1	6	1+1	0
10	FW	(Scotland) SCO	Lee Connelly	40	9	28+2	7	4+0	2	4+0	0	2+0	0
11	MF	(Scotland) SCO	Aidan Fitzpatrick	14	3	3+9	2	2+0	1	0+0	0	0+0	0
12	GK	(England) ENG	Sol Brynn	21	0	16+0	0	3+0	0	0+0	0	2+0	0
13	DF	(Nigeria) NGR	Josh Debayo	26	0	21+2	0	3+0	0	0+0	0	0+0	0
14	MF	(England) ENG	Ben Liddle	19	1	9+8	1	1+1	0	0+0	0	0+0	0
15	MF	(Scotland) SCO	Calvin McGrory	33	0	23+1	0	3+1	0	3+0	0	2+0	0
16	DF	(Scotland) SCO	Euan East	35	4	24+2	4	2+2	0	4+0	0	0+1	0
17	FW	(Scotland) SCO	Niyah Joseph	18	0	2+8	0	0+3	0	3+1	0	1+0	0
18	MF	(Scotland) SCO	Kieran McKechnie	7	0	1+5	0	0+1	0	0+0	0	0+0	0
19	FW	(Scotland) SCO	Innes Cameron	23	3	23+0	3	0+0	0	0+0	0	0+0	0
20	DF	(England) ENG	Robert Nditi	33	0	22+4	0	2+0	0	4+0	0	1+0	0
21	MF	(Scotland) SCO	Dom McMahon	5	0	0+0	0	0+1	0	0+4	0	0+0	0
22	DF	(Scotland) SCO	Max Johnston	31	3	24+1	2	4+0	1	0+0	0	2+0	0
*23	MF	(Scotland) SCO	Olly McDonald	0	0	0+0	0	0+0	0	0+0	0	0+0	0
23	MF	(Northern Ireland) NIR	Shea Gordon	12	1	9+3	1	0+0	0	0+0	0	0+0	0
24	FW	(England) ENG	Sam Folarin	7	0	1+6	0	0+0	0	0+0	0	0+0	0
25	DF	(Scotland) SCO	Scott Dunn	3	0	0+0	0	0+0	0	3+0	0	0+0	0
26	DF	(Scotland) SCO	Ryan Muir	1	0	0+0	0	0+0	0	0+1	0	0+0	0
27	DF	(Scotland) SCO	Owen Hunter	0	0	0+0	0	0+0	0	0+0	0	0+0	0
28	MF	(Scotland) SCO	Connor Potts	1	0	0+0	0	0+0	0	0+1	0	0+0	0
29	DF	(Scotland) SCO	Matthew Henderson	0	0	0+0	0	0+0	0	0+0	0	0+0	0
30	GK	(Scotland) SCO	Charlie Cowie	1	0	0+1	0	0+0	0	0+0	0	0+0	0
31	DF	(Scotland) SCO	Aidan Moffat	0	0	0+0	0	0+0	0	0+0	0	0+0	0
32	DF	(Scotland) SCO	Christopher Stewart	0	0	0+0	0	0+0	0	0+0	0	0+0	0
33	DF	(Scotland) SCO	Willie Gibson	46	2	35+0	1	5+0	1	4+0	0	2+0	0
34	GK	(Scotland) SCO	Konar Pietsch	0	0	0+0	0	0+0	0	0+0	0	0+0	0
49	FW	(Portugal) POR	Ruben Soares-Junior	33	3	15+7	1	3+2	0	4+0	1	2+0	1

=== Disciplinary record ===
As of 30 April 2022 (UTC)

Number	Nation	Position	Name	Scottish Championship		Challenge Cup		League Cup		Scottish Cup		Total	
Number	Nation	Position	Name	Yellow card	Red card	Yellow card	Red card	Yellow card	Red card	Yellow card	Red card	Yellow card	Red card
1	(Scotland)	GK	Josh Rae	1	0	0	0	0	0	0	0	1	0
2	(Republic of Ireland)	DF	Darragh O'Connor	2	0	0	0	0	0	0	0	2	0
3	(Scotland)	DF	Alex Cooper	1	0	0	0	0	0	0	0	1	0
5	(Scotland)	DF	Paul McKay	1	0	0	0	0	0	0	0	1	0
7	(Republic of Ireland)	FW	Ruari Paton	3	0	2	0	0	0	0	0	5	0
8	(England)	MF	Josh Todd	2	0	0	0	0	0	0	0	2	0
9	(Northern Ireland)	FW	Ally Roy	3	0	0	0	0	0	0	0	3	0
10	(Scotland)	FW	Lee Connelly	2	0	0	0	1	0	1	0	4	0
13	(Nigeria)	DF	Josh Debayo	3	0	0	0	0	0	0	0	3	0
14	(England)	MF	Ben Liddle	6	1	0	0	0	0	0	0	6	1
15	(Scotland)	MF	Calvin McGrory	1	0	1	0	2	0	0	0	4	0
17	(Scotland)	FW	Niyah Joseph	0	0	0	0	1	0	1	0	2	0
19	(Scotland)	FW	Innes Cameron	4	0	0	0	0	0	0	0	4	0
20	(England)	DF	Robert Nditi	5	0	1	0	0	0	0	1	6	1
22	(Scotland)	DF	Max Johnston	3	0	0	0	0	0	1	0	4	0
25	(Scotland)	DF	Scott Dunn	0	0	0	0	1	0	0	0	1	0
33	(Scotland)	DF	Willie Gibson	5	1	0	0	0	0	1	0	6	1
49	(Portugal)	FW	Ruben Soares-Junior	0	0	2	0	0	0	0	0	2	0
Totals				42	2	6	0	5	0	4	1	57	3

=== Top scorers ===
Last updated 30 April 2022

Position	Nation	Name	Scottish Championship	League Cup	Challenge Cup	Scottish Cup	Total
1	(Northern Ireland)	Ally Roy	4	6	2	0	12
2	(Scotland)	Lee Connelly	7	0	2	0	9
3	(Republic of Ireland)	Ruari Paton	3	2	2	1	8
4	(Scotland)	Euan East	4	0	0	0	4
5	(Portugal)	Ruben Soares-Junior	1	1	0	1	3
=	(Scotland)	Innes Cameron	3	0	0	0	3
=	(Scotland)	Max Johnston	2	0	1	0	3
=	(Scotland)	Aidan Fitzpatrick	2	0	1	0	3
9	(Scotland)	Willie Gibson	1	0	1	0	2
=	(Scotland)	Alex Cooper	2	0	0	0	2
=	(England)	Josh Todd	2	0	0	0	2
12	(England)	Ben Liddle	1	0	0	0	1
=	(Northern Ireland)	Shea Gordon	1	0	0	0	1
=	(Republic of Ireland)	Darragh O'Connor	1	0	0	0	1

=== Clean sheets ===
R	Pos	Nat	Name	Scottish Championship	League Cup	Challenge Cup	Scottish Cup	Total
1	GK	(Scotland)	Josh Rae	3	0	1	0	4
12	GK	(England)	Sol Brynn	5	0	2	0	7
Total				8	0	3	0	11

Last updated: 30 April 2022
Source: Match reports in Competitive matches

== Team statistics ==
=== Scottish Championship ===
==== League table ====
Pos	Team	Pld	W	D	L	GF	GA	GD	Pts	Promotion, qualification or relegation
6	Hamilton Academical	36	10	12	14	38	53	−15	42	
7	Greenock Morton	36	9	13	14	36	47	−11	40	
8	Ayr United	36	9	12	15	39	52	−13	39	
9	Dunfermline Athletic (R)	36	7	14	15	36	53	−17	35	Qualification for the Championship play-offs
10	Queen of the South (R)	36	8	9	19	36	54	−18	33	Relegation to League One

Rules for classification: 1) Points; 2) Goal difference; 3) Goals scored; 4) Head-to-to head points; 5) Head-to-head goal difference; 6) Play-off (only for deciding promotion, play-off participation and relegation).
(R) Relegated

==== Results by round ====
Round	1	2	3	4	5	6	7	8	9	10	11	12	13	14	15	16	17	18	19	20	21	22	23	24	25	26	27	28	29	30	31	32	33	34	35	36
Ground	A	H	A	H	A	H	A	H	A	H	A	A	H	A	H	H	A	H	H	H	A	H	A	A	H	A	H	A	H	A	A	H	A	H	H	A
Result	L	L	W	L	W	L	L	W	L	D	L	L	D	D	L	D	D	W	L	L	D	L	D	L	D	W	W	L	L	L	L	L	L	W	D	W
Position	8	10	6	8	5	7	7	6	7	7	8	8	9	9	10	10	9	7	8	9	9	10	10	10	10	10	9	9	9	10	10	10	10	10	10	10

Updated to match(es) played on 30 April 2022. Source:
A = Away; H = Home; W = Win; D = Draw; L = Loss

=== League Cup table ===
Pos	Team	Pld	W	PW	PL	L	GF	GA	GD	Pts	Qualification	MOT	QPK	QOS	AIR	ANN
1	Motherwell	4	3	0	0	1	6	4	+2	9	Qualification for the second round	—	—	3–2	—	2–0
2	Queen's Park	4	2	0	1	1	3	2	+1	7		0–1	—	—	0–0p	—
3	Queen of the South	4	2	0	0	2	9	6	+3	6		–	0–1	—	4–1	—
4	Airdrieonians	4	1	1	1	1	4	5	−1	6		2–0	—	—	—	1–1p
5	Annan Athletic	4	0	1	0	3	3	8	−5	2		—	1–2	1–3	—	—

Rules for classification: 1) goal difference, 2) goals scored, 3) away goals scored, 4) matches won, 5) away matches won, 6) drawing of lots.

=== Management statistics ===
Last updated 30 April 2022

Name	From	To	P	W	D	L	Win% (Note: Win% is the percentage of matches won rounded to two decimal places.)
Allan Johnston	10 July 2021	12 February 2022	33	9	8	16	27.27
Willie Gibson	19 February 2022	29 April 2022	14	5	2	7	35.71

== Transfers ==
=== Players in ===
Player	From	Fee
(Scotland) Paul McKay	(Scotland) Airdrieonians	Free
(England) Josh Todd	(Scotland) Falkirk	Free
(England) Roberto Nditi	(Scotland) Forfar Athletic	Free
(Northern Ireland) Ally Roy	(Scotland) Airdrieonians	Free
(Scotland) Josh Rae	(Scotland) Peterhead	Free
(Scotland) Lee Connelly	(England) Sunderland	Free
(Republic of Ireland) Ruari Paton	(Scotland) Stranraer	Undisclosed
(Portugal) Ruben Soares-Junior	(England) Billericay Town	Free
(Scotland) Alex Cooper	(Republic of Ireland) Sligo Rovers	Free
(Scotland) Harry Cochrane	(Scotland) Heart of Midlothian	Undisclosed
(Nigeria) Josh Debayo	(England) Wealdstone	Free
(Nigeria) Udoka Chima	(England) Burnley	Free
(England) Sol Brynn	(England) Middlesbrough	Loan
(Scotland) Olly McDonald	(Scotland) Kilmarnock	Free
(Scotland) Matthew Henderson	(Scotland) Rangers	Free
(England) Ben Liddle	(England) Bristol Rovers	Loan
(Scotland) Max Johnston	(Scotland) Motherwell	Loan
(Scotland) Aidan Fitzpatrick	(England) Norwich City	Free
(Scotland) Gary Maley	(Scotland) Livingston	Loan
(Scotland) Innes Cameron	(Scotland) Kilmarnock	Loan
(Northern Ireland) Shea Gordon	(Scotland) Partick Thistle	Loan
(England) Sam Folarin	(England) Middlesbrough	Loan
(Republic of Ireland) Darragh O'Connor	(Scotland) Motherwell	Loan
(Scotland) Innes Cameron	(Scotland) Kilmarnock	Loan

=== Players out ===
Player	To	Fee
(Scotland) Connor Shields	(Scotland) Motherwell	Free
(England) Ayo Obileye	(Scotland) Livingston	Free
(Scotland) Stephen Dobbie	(England) AFC Fylde	Free
(Scotland) Rohan Ferguson	(Northern Ireland) Larne	Free
(Scotland) Joe McKee	(Scotland) Dumbarton	Free
(Scotland) Rhys McCabe	(Scotland) Airdrieonians	Free
(Scotland) Jack Leighfield	(England) Lancaster City	Free
(England) Nortei Nortey	Free Agent	Free
(Scotland) Gregor Buchanan	(Scotland) Dumbarton	Free
(England) Dan Pybus	(Scotland) Dunfermline Athletic	Free
(Scotland) Dom McMahon	(Scotland) Dalbeattie Star	Loan
(Scotland) Ryan Muir	(Scotland) Dalbeattie Star	Loan
(Scotland) Olly McDonald	(Scotland) East Stirlingshire	Loan
(Scotland) Scott Dunn	(Scotland) Broomhill	Loan
(Scotland) Matthew Henderson	(Scotland) Caledonian Braves	Loan
(Scotland) Connor Potts	(Scotland) Dalbeattie Star	Free
(England) Sol Brynn	(England) Middlesbrough	Loan
(Scotland) Innes Cameron	(Scotland) Kilmarnock	Loan
(Scotland) Scott Dunn	(Scotland) Cowdenbeath	Loan

== See also ==
- List of Queen of the South F.C. seasons
