= Alexander Clarke =

Alexander Clarke may refer to:

- Alexander Ross Clarke, British geodesist
- Alexander Clarke (cricketer), Guyanese cricketer

== See also ==
- Alex Clarke (disambiguation)
- Alexander Clark (disambiguation)
