= Alex Clark =

Alex Clark may refer to:

- Alex Clark (baseball), American baseball player
- Alex Clark (journalist), British literary journalist
- Alex Clark (politician) (1916–1991), American politician
- Alex Clark (squash player) (born 1987), Scottish squash player
- Alex Clark (commentator) (born 1993), American media personality

== See also ==
- Alex Clarke (disambiguation)
- Alexander Clark (disambiguation)
