= Willie Gibson (footballer, born 1984) =

Scottish footballer (born 1984)

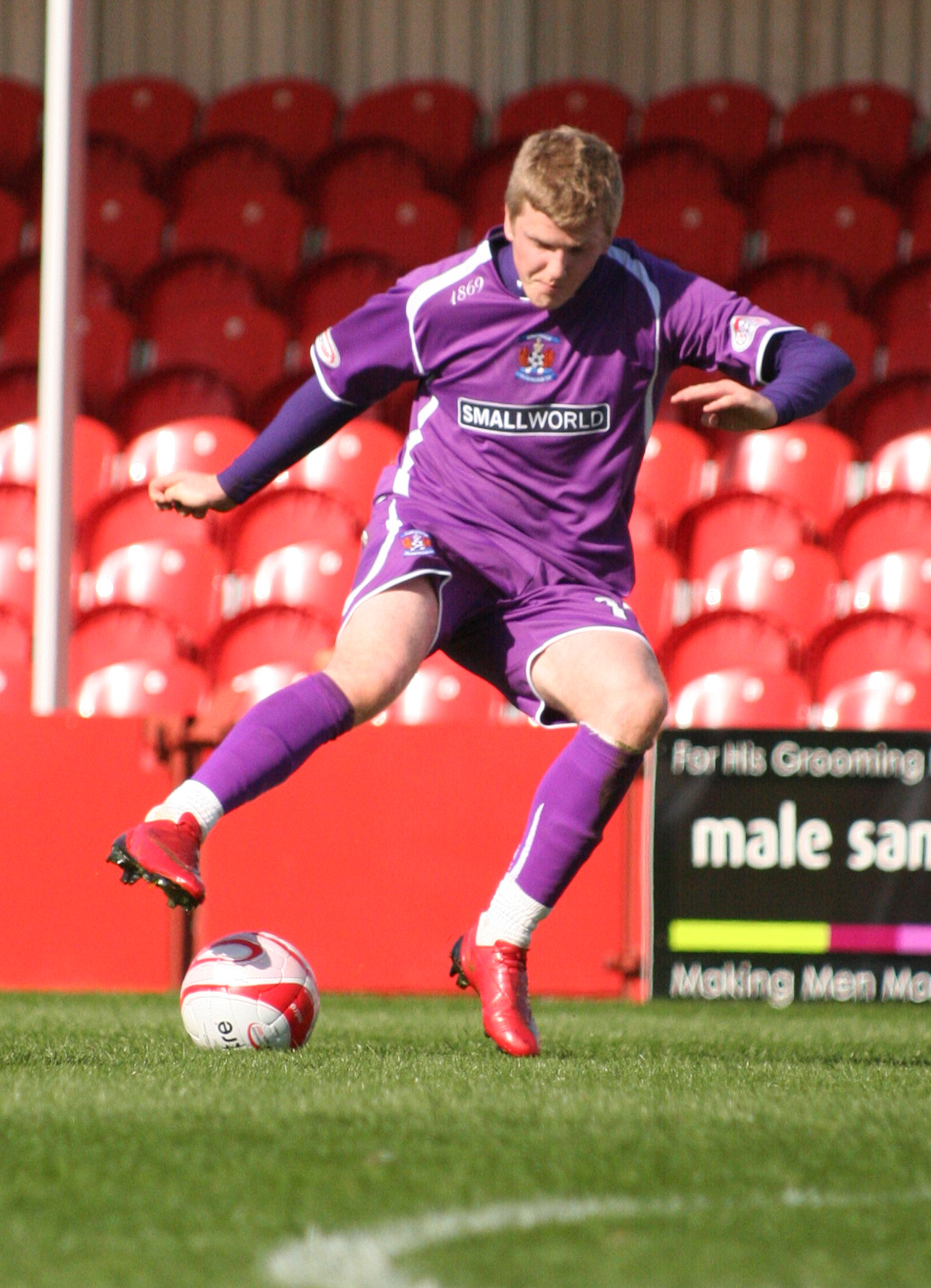
- Gibson playing for Kilmarnock

Personal information
- Date of birth: 6 August 1984 (age 42)
- Place of birth: Dumfries, Scotland
- Position: Right-back

Team information
- Current team: Annan Athletic (player-manager)

Senior career*
Years	Team	Apps	(Gls)
2001–2007	Queen of the South	93	(0)
2007–2009	Kilmarnock	51	(6)
2009–2011	Dunfermline Athletic	49	(15)
2011–2012	Crawley Town	14	(1)
2011–2012	→ St Johnstone (loan)	11	(0)
2012	Falkirk	12	(1)
2012–2013	Queen of the South	17	(2)
2013–2014	Celtic Nation	0	(0)
2014	Stranraer	28	(9)
2014–2015	Dumbarton	18	(2)
2015–2016	Stranraer	49	(11)
2016–2017	Peterhead	72	(6)
2017–2019	Stenhousemuir	8	(0)
2019–2022	Queen of the South	67	(3)
2023–	Annan Athletic	112	(11)

Managerial career
- 2022: Queen of the South
- 2024–: Annan Athletic
- * Club domestic league appearances and goals as of 18:46, 10 April 2026 (UTC)

William Gibson (born 6 August 1984) is a Scottish football player and coach who is the player-manager of Scottish League Two club Annan Athletic.

Gibson has previously had three spells with Queen of the South, and also appeared for Kilmarnock, Dunfermline Athletic, Crawley Town, St Johnstone, Falkirk, Celtic Nation, Workington, Stranraer (two spells), Dumbarton, Peterhead and Stenhousemuir in a playing career surpassing two decades. Gibson was also player-manager at Queen of the South from February until December 2022.

== Playing career ==
=== Queen of the South (first spell) ===
Born in Dumfries, Gibson started his senior career with hometown club Queen of the South and debuted on the final day of the 2000–01 season in a 1–0 loss to Queen's Park. Gibson played in 93 league matches for the Dumfries club without scoring a league goal, although he scored his only goal for Queens during his first spell with a 50th-minute winner in a 2–1 Scottish Cup third round match versus Montrose on 8 January 2005.

Gibson then signed for Kilmarnock from the Palmerston Park club in early 2007, in a deal which saw Stevie Murray and Jamie Adams join Queens on loan for the rest of the 2006–07 season. Gibson's last game for Queens, a Scottish Cup quarter final match at home versus Hibernian, was one of some controversy: manager Ian McCall selected Adams to play, despite Adams having been an unused sub for Kilmarnock in that season's Scottish Cup third round. Queens were subsequently fined £20,000 by the SFA for fielding an ineligible player. Queens chairman Davie Rae said of the fine "it's a substantial sum".

=== Kilmarnock ===
Gibson joined Killie on 1 March 2007 and debuted on 3 March 2007, appearing as a late substitute in a 2–0 win versus St Mirren; he played in three other matches that season.

In his first full season at Kilmarnock, Gibson made a good start, scoring his first goal in a 2–1 win over Dundee United in the second league match of the season. On 1 September 2007 he produced another impressive performance against Aberdeen, tormenting the Dons defence, although Kilmarnock were defeated 1–0; after the match, Gibson said he was disappointed the team had lost, believing they had enough possession and created enough chances to earn a victory. Gibson went on to score three goals against Gretna in separate matches.

The next season, Gibson sat out the club's first ten matches as an unused substitute and played his first match of the campaign, providing an assist, as Kilmarnock were defeated 2–1 by Falkirk. On 22 November 2008, Gibson scored his first goal of the season in a 2–1 defeat to Inverness Caledonian Thistle. During a 1–0 defeat against Hamilton on 29 November 2008, Gibson wore pink boots in the match so he would stand out. Shortly after this match he damaged his kneecap in training, although he was back fit to play after just one week out injured. On his return, Gibson appeared as a substitute and set-up both goals in a 2–0 win over Hibernian. Before kick-off in a match against Hearts, Gibson accidentally hit a young Killie supporter on the back of the head with the ball. As an apology, the young fan was treated to a day out behind-the-scenes at Rugby Park and presented with a pair of his football boots. Gibson played 51 league matches for Kilmarnock, scoring six league goals.

=== Dunfermline Athletic ===
Gibson signed for Dunfermline Athletic on 23 June 2009 for a nominal fee. His debut for the Pars was in a Scottish League Cup match, providing an assist for David Graham in a 5–0 win over Dumbarton. One week later Gibson made his league debut in the opening game of the season, a 1–0 defeat versus Inverness CT. A week later, Gibson received a straight red card after a clash with Darren Smith in a 3–1 defeat to Raith Rovers. Two months after joining the club, Gibson scored his first two goals on 10 October 2009, also providing an assist for Andy Kirk, in a 3–1 win versus Ayr United. Gibson scored another brace in a 3–1 win over Partick Thistle and then scored another six goals in his first season with the East End Park club.

In his second season, Gibson continued to score, with his first brace of the season, as the Pars drew 2–2 with Dundee on 23 October 2010. Then playing versus Queen of the South, on 11 December 2010, he was given a straight red card. Gibson played 49 league matches for Dunfermline, scoring 15 league goals.

=== Crawley Town ===
On 31 January 2011, Gibson signed for non-league club Crawley Town for an undisclosed fee, thought to be around £150,000, after turning down an offer from the club the previous summer. Gibson debuted in a 0–0 draw versus Kettering on 3 February 2011 in an away match. With only three appearances for Crawley Town, on 19 February 2011, Gibson started in the FA Cup match versus Manchester United at Old Trafford. Manchester United won the match 1–0 as Wes Brown scored the only goal.

On 24 August 2011, Gibson returned north of the border to sign for Perth club St Johnstone, in a loan deal until the end of January 2012 – he had been feeling homesick, as his two young children had remained in Scotland since his move down south. He debuted for St Johnstone on 24 August 2011 versus Livingston in the Scottish League Cup, in a 3–0 home win, and set up the first two goals. After his loan spell ended, Gibson left Crawley Town by mutual consent. He played 14 league matches for the Red Devils, scoring one league goal.

=== Falkirk ===
On 31 January 2012, STV reported on their website that Gibson had signed for Falkirk. This was not officially confirmed until 2 February when the club revealed he had signed until the end of the season. Gibson said his move to the Bairns could revive his career after experiencing a difficult spell at Crawley Town. Gibson debuted against Greenock Morton at Cappielow on 11 February 2012, appearing as a substitute. He scored his first goal against Queen of the South on 25 February 2012.

After being substituted versus Raith Rovers on 21 April 2012, Gibson stormed out of the Falkirk Stadium. After the match, he apologised for his actions. However, Falkirk manager Steven Pressley said that Gibson would never play for the Bairns ever again. In response, Gibson said he was treated as a scapegoat by Pressley and criticised him for "dishing the dirt" on him in public. At the end of the season Gibson's contract was not renewed and he departed the club, having played 12 league matches for the Bairns, scoring one league goal.

=== Queen of the South (second spell) ===
On 14 June 2012, Gibson returned to Queen of the South on a one-year contract. Manager Allan Johnston commented that Gibson could help the Doonhamers gain promotion straight back up to the First Division. Gibson departed Palmerston Park by mutual consent in April 2013, having played 17 league matches, scoring two league goals.

=== Celtic Nation ===
For the 2013–14 season, Gibson signed for Northern League club Celtic Nation.

=== Stranraer, Dumbarton, Peterhead and Stenhousemuir ===
On 28 August 2014, Gibson signed for Scottish League One club Stranraer. He scored on his debut with a free-kick versus former club Dunfermline Athletic and overall played 28 league matches, having scored nine league goals in his first spell with the Blues.

Gibson signed for Dumbarton in June 2015, teaming up with his former manager Stevie Aitken. Gibson scored the winner on his debut in a 1–0 win over Edinburgh City. He scored a free-kick winner at home on his league debut against Hibernian and netted again from a free kick the following week in another 2–1 victory, this time versus St Mirren. After six months with Dumbarton, Gibson was released from his contract with the Sons, having played 18 league matches, scoring two league goals. Gibson then re-signed for Stranraer on an 18-month contract. He departed at the end of his contract in May 2017, having played 49 league goals, scoring 11 league goals in his second spell at Stair Park.

Gibson subsequently joined recently relegated Scottish League Two club Peterhead on 7 June 2017, where he initially signed a one-year contract, before signing a one-year extension. Gibson played 72 league matches, scoring six league goals in his two seasons at the Blue Toon.

Gibson then signed for Stenhousemuir for the 2019–20 season and played 8 league matches without scoring any goals.

=== Queen of the South (third spell) ===
After one season as manager of Queen of the South's reserve team, Gibson signed for the Doonhamers on 15 September 2020 for a third spell at his hometown club.

On 8 January 2021, Gibson opened the scoring in the Doonhamers 3–0 Scottish Cup 2nd round win over Queen's Park at Hampden Park; it was only his fourth goal for the club over three spells. The following month he scored Queens' third goal in a 3–2 win against Dundee at Dens Park, then scored the only goal of a victory over former club Dunfermline Athletic at Palmerston Park. On 5 March 2021, Gibson was named Scottish Championship Player of the Month for February 2021.

On 12 May 2021, Gibson signed a one-year contract extension to remain at Palmerston for the 2021–22 season. Before the start of the season he was named the new club captain, after the departure of Stephen Dobbie.

On 25 February 2022, Gibson relinquished the club captaincy after being appointed player-manager earlier in the week and handed the role to the club's vice-captain Josh Todd. In September 2022, he and 17-year-old son Lewis made history when they appeared together in the closing minutes of a League One fixture against FC Edinburgh, becoming the first parent and child to play in the same team in Scottish senior football. After largely focusing on the management side of his role, Gibson would depart the club by mutual consent on 21 December 2022.

=== Annan Athletic ===
On 25 January 2023, Gibson joined Scottish League Two club Annan Athletic until the end of the season.

== Coaching career ==
=== Queen of the South ===
On 13 February 2022, following the departure of Allan Johnston and Sandy Clark, Gibson was appointed interim player-manager of Queen of the South. In his first match in interim charge, Gibson (with former Raith Rovers manager Grant Murray as his assistant) earned a 0–0 draw with Arbroath, then leaders of the Scottish Championship, at Palmerston Park. On 21 February 2022, the Doonhamers announced that Gibson and Murray would be the management team until the end of the 2021–22 season. On 4 May 2022, this was extended to the end of 2022–23. On 21 December 2022, Gibson departed the Dumfries club by mutual consent, with his assistant manager Murray then placed in interim charge of the Doonhamers.

=== Annan Athletic ===
Gibson was appointed manager of Annan Athletic on 16 May 2024.

== Career statistics ==
As of match played 4 April 2026

Club	Season	League			National Cup		League Cup		Other		Total	
Club	Season	Division	Apps	Goals	Apps	Goals	Apps	Goals	Apps	Goals	Apps	Goals
Queen of the South	2000–01	Scottish Second Division	1	0	0	0	0	0	0	0	1	0
Queen of the South	2002–03	Scottish First Division	3	0	0	0	0	0	0	0	3	0
Queen of the South	2003–04	Scottish First Division	15	0	0	0	1	0	1	0	17	0
Queen of the South	2004–05	Scottish First Division	20	0	2	1	0	0	1	0	23	1
Queen of the South	2005–06	Scottish First Division	32	0	2	0	1	0	0	0	35	0
Queen of the South	2006–07	Scottish First Division	22	0	3	0	1	0	2	0	28	0
Queen of the South	Total		93	0	7	1	3	0	4	0	107	1
Kilmarnock	2006–07	Scottish Premier League	7	0	0	0	0	0	0	0	7	0
Kilmarnock	2007–08	Scottish Premier League	23	4	2	0	2	0	0	0	27	4
Kilmarnock	2008–09	Scottish Premier League	21	1	3	0	1	0	0	0	25	1
Kilmarnock	Total		51	5	5	0	3	0	0	0	59	5
Dunfermline Athletic	2009–10	Scottish First Division	34	9	3	1	2	0	2	0	41	10
Dunfermline Athletic	2010–11	Scottish First Division	15	6	1	1	2	0	0	0	18	7
Dunfermline Athletic	Total		49	15	4	2	4	0	2	0	59	17
Crawley Town	2010–11	Blue Square Bet Premier	14	1	1	0	0	0	0	0	15	1
St Johnstone	2011–12	Scottish Premier League	11	0	0	0	2	0	0	0	13	0
Falkirk	2011–12	Scottish First Division	12	1	1	0	0	0	1	0	14	1
Queen of the South	2012–13	Scottish Second Division	17	2	2	0	2	0	2	0	23	2
Celtic Nation	2013–14	Northern Football League	7	0	0	0	0	0	0	0	7	0
Stranraer	2014–15	Scottish League One	28	9	3	1	0	0	4	0	35	10
Dumbarton	2015–16	Scottish Championship	18	2	0	0	1	0	2	0	21	2
Stranraer	2015–16	Scottish League One	16	3	1	0	0	0	4	1	21	4
Stranraer	2016–17	Scottish League One	33	8	2	1	4	0	3	1	42	10
Stranraer	Total		49	11	3	1	4	0	7	2	63	14
Peterhead	2017–18	Scottish League Two	35	3	3	0	4	0	7	0	49	3
Peterhead	2018–19	Scottish League Two	36	3	3	0	3	0	2	0	44	3
Peterhead	2019–20	Scottish League One	1	0	0	0	4	0	0	0	5	0
Peterhead	Total		72	6	6	0	11	0	9	0	98	6
Stenhousemuir	2019–20	Scottish League Two	8	0	1	0	0	0	3	0	12	0
Queen of the South	2020–21	Scottish Championship	27	2	2	1	3	0	0	0	32	3
Queen of the South	2021–22	Scottish Championship	35	1	2	0	4	0	5	1	46	2
Queen of the South	2022–23	Scottish League One	5	0	0	0	1	0	2	0	9	0
Queen of the South	Total		67	3	4	1	8	0	7	1	86	5
Annan Athletic	2022–23	Scottish League Two	13	2	0	0	0	0	3	0	16	2
Annan Athletic	2023–24	Scottish League One	36	3	1	0	3	0	2	0	42	3
Annan Athletic	2024–25	Scottish League One	34	4	1	0	4	0	2	1	43	5
Annan Athletic	2025–26	Scottish League Two	29	2	3	2	2	0	6	0	40	4
Career total			608	66	42	8	47	0	54	4	751	78

== Honours ==
Falkirk

- Scottish Challenge Cup: 2011–12

== Managerial record ==
As of match played 14 November 2026

Managerial record by team and tenure
Team	Nat	From	To	Record					Ref.
Team	Nat	From	To	G	W	D	L	Win %	Ref.
Queen of the South	(Scotland)	13 February 2022	21 December 2022	41	15	8	18	36.59	
Annan Athletic	(Scotland)	16 May 2024		122	37	25	60	30.33	
Career Total				163	52	33	78	31.90	—

- Initially caretaker at Queen of the South and was appointed permanently on 21 February 2022
