= Alexander Clark (disambiguation) =

Alexander Clark was a businessman and ambassador.

Alexander Clark may also refer to:

- Alexander Clark (rower)
- Alexander Clark of Balbirnie, Scottish merchant and Provost of Edinburgh
- Alexander Clark (football manager)

== See also ==
- Alex Clark (disambiguation)
- Alexander Clarke (disambiguation)
