= Ruari Paton =

Irish association footballer

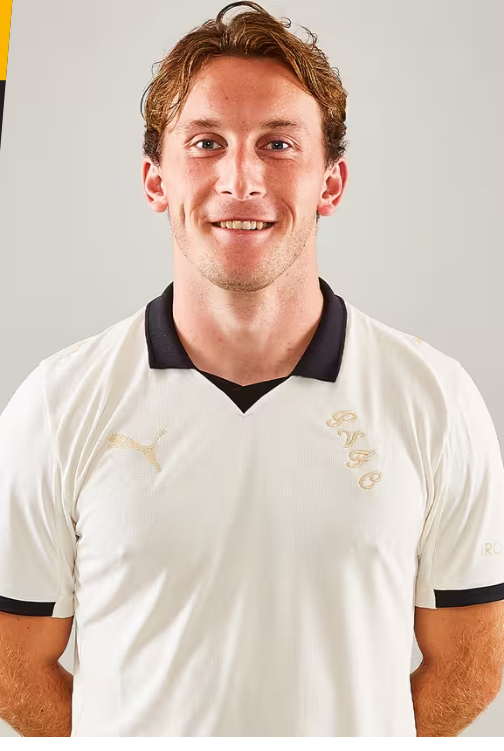
- Paton in 2025

Personal information
- Full name: Ruari Michael Paton
- Date of birth: 9 August 2000 (age 26)
- Place of birth: Dublin, Ireland
- Height: 1.77 m (5 ft 9 1/2 in)
- Position: Striker

Team information
- Current team: St Johnstone

Youth career
- 2012: Shelbourne
- 2013: St Kevin's Boys
- 2014–2016: Belvedere
- 2016–2018: Hibernian

Senior career*
Years	Team	Apps	(Gls)
2018–2019	Hibernian	0	(0)
2018–2019	→ Gala Fairydean Rovers (loan)		
2019–2020	East Kilbride		
2020–2021	Stranraer	21	(6)
2021–2023	Queen of the South	70	(25)
2023–2024	Queen's Park	36	(17)
2024–2026	Port Vale	32	(2)
2025	→ Dundee United (loan)	12	(0)
2026	→ St Johnstone (loan)	13	(5)
2026–	St Johnstone	5	(1)

International career
	Republic of Ireland U16	2	(0)
- * Club domestic league appearances and goals as of 21:54, 9 September 2026 (UTC)

Ruari Michael Paton (born 9 August 2000) is an Irish professional footballer who plays as a striker for Scottish Premiership club St Johnstone. He has represented the Republic of Ireland at under-16 level.

Paton, a talented dancer, spent his youth with Shelbourne, St Kevin's Boys and Belvedere, before he left Ireland to join the development squad at Scottish club Hibernian. He spent time on loan at Gala Fairydean Rovers, before joining East Kilbride in July 2019 after being released from Hibernian. His goal record in the Lowland League earned him a move to Stranraer in Scottish League Two. He was signed by Queen of the South in July 2021 and played on the losing side in the 2022 final of the Scottish Challenge Cup. He was named to the PFA Scotland Team of the Year following 22 Scottish League One goals in the 2022–23 season. He was sold to Queen's Park in June 2023 and was again named on the PFA Scotland Team of the Year after scoring 17 Scottish Championship goals in the 2023–24 campaign. He was signed by English club Port Vale for an undisclosed fee in July 2024 and returned to Scotland on loan at Dundee United in January 2025 and at St Johnstone in February 2026. He helped St Johnstone to win the Scottish Championship title at the end of the 2025–26 campaign and joined the club permanently in the summer.

== Early life ==
Ruari Paton was born in Dublin on 9 August 2000. He grew up in Carpenterstown. His mother came from Bristol. He was a talented dancer in his youth. He gained a Higher in PE and a Sports Leadership Award from Ross High School.

== Career ==
=== Early career ===
Paton played for Belvedere in Dublin before signing for Hibernian as a 16-year-old on a pro-youth contract. On 19 September 2018, he joined Gala Fairydean Rovers of the Lowland League on loan. On 22 September, he scored a hat-trick in a 6–0 win over Lossiemouth in a Scottish Cup qualification match at Netherdale. He scored 13 league goals in the 2018–19 season. He did not play a first-team game at Easter Road and was one of 17 players released from Hibernian in May 2019. He later said "I went there thinking I was the man and had it all sorted out and would go to the first team. It did not work out that way and life comes around and hits you in the face."

Paton failed a trial with Airdrieonians as manager Ian Murray felt he was not good enough for professional football. On 3 July 2019, he signed with Lowland League champions East Kilbride. Paton said that "Stuart Malcolm [East Kilbride manager] gave me a chance there when no one else would". He supplemented his income playing for East Kilbride by working as a labourer on a building site. He later said that "I was eating Pot Noodles every day for dinner" due to lack of finances, but that he refused to accept returning to Ireland without having made a success of his footballing career in Scotland. He scored 12 goals by November, helping the Lowland League side to reach the third round of the Scottish Cup. He scored 12 league goals in the 2019–20 season.

=== Stranraer ===
Paton agreed a two-year contract with Stranraer. He had caught the eye of manager Stephen Farrell with his goalscoring record the previous season, which had been cut short due to the COVID-19 pandemic in Scotland. He was signed to compete with Thomas Orr for a place alongside veteran forward Darryl Duffy. The three players ended up playing as an attacking trio. The Blues qualified for the Scottish League Two play-offs at the end of the 2020–21 season, losing to Dumbarton at the semi-final stage. Paton scored nine goals in 30 matches at Stair Park.

=== Queen of the South ===
On 2 July 2021, Paton signed a two-year contract with Queen of the South in Dumfries, following an undisclosed transfer fee. Manager Allan Johnston said he was "a great young prospect that we all have high hopes for". Paton scored his first goals for the Palmerston Park club later that month in his first two games versus Annan Athletic and Motherwell in the Scottish League Cup. He scored the winning goal in the Scottish Challenge Cup quarter-finals. Queen of the South reached the final of the Challenge Cup at Excelsior Stadium, where they were beaten 3–1 by Raith Rovers. Paton ended the 2021–22 campaign with eight goals in 45 games, with three goals coming in the league. Queens were relegated from the Scottish Championship in last place.

Paton finished the 2022–23 season with 25 goals for the Doonhamers. Paton finished as joint-top scorer in Scottish League One, alongside Calum Gallagher of Airdrieonians, and was also named on the PFA Scotland Team of the Year. Speaking in March, manager Marvin Bartley told his players to be less reliant on Paton's goalscoring ability to win games for them. The team finished in fifth place, missing out on the play-offs by three points.

=== Queen's Park ===
On 22 June 2023, Paton returned to the Scottish Championship after signing a three-year contract with Queen's Park. On 25 July, Paton scored four goals in a 5–0 win over Elgin City in the Scottish League Cup at Hampden Park, his first professional hat-trick and four-goal haul in his career. He was named Scottish Championship Player of the Month after scoring three league goals to send Robin Veldman's Spiders top of the table in August. Paton scored 25 goals in the 2023–24 season and was named on the PFA Scotland Team of the Year, and was also nominated for the Player of the Year award. In the expectation that Paton would leave the club, manager Callum Davidson signed Zak Rudden as his replacement in July 2024.

=== Port Vale ===
On 15 July 2024, Paton signed a three-year deal with English League Two club Port Vale for an undisclosed "six-figure" transfer fee. He scored his first goal for the Valiants in his second appearance for the club, converting a 25 yards (23 m) free kick in a 3–2 defeat at Barrow in an EFL Cup fixture on 13 August; he was also named as man of the match. Paton lost his first-team place, but marked his return to the starting eleven with the only goal of the game at Harrogate Town on 22 October. He struggled for league starts for the Valiants under Darren Moore, however, and returned to Scotland on loan at Premiership club Dundee United on 20 January 2025 after manager Jim Goodwin looked to bolster his attacking line. He made his debut for the "Tangerines" later that day in the Dundee derby and "was denied a debut goal by an outstanding Ethan Ingram block" as United lost 1–0 at Dundee. He played a total of 13 games for Dundee United.

On 22 July 2025, Paton became the first player to score against Everton at the new Everton Stadium in a pre-season friendly defeat. He missed the first month of the 2025–26 season, however, after tweaking a hip muscle. His goal at Exeter City on 13 September was his first in the EFL since October, and he said after the match he was aiming to give the manager no choice but to play him. Paton was named on that week's League One Team of the Week.

=== St Johnstone ===
On 2 February 2026, Paton joined Scottish Championship leaders St Johnstone on loan until the end of the 2025–26 season. He said he felt "pure excitement" at joining the promotion push at McDiarmid Park. He scored on his debut at Airdrieonians 11 days later to extend the Saints lead at the top of the table. On 21 April, he scored the second goal of a 2–0 victory at Dunfermline Athletic that confirmed St Johnstone as champions of the Championship. He returned to Vale Park to find himself transfer listed, and joined St Johnstone for an undisclosed fee on 25 June.

== Style of play ==
Paton is a hard-working striker with an excellent goalscoring record. He often celebrates goals by dancing.

== Career statistics ==
As of match played 1 May 2026

Appearances and goals by club, season and competition
Club	Season	League			National cup (Note: Includes Scottish Cup, FA Cup)		League cup (Note: Includes Scottish League Cup, EFL Cup)		Other		Total	
Club	Season	Division	Apps	Goals	Apps	Goals	Apps	Goals	Apps	Goals	Apps	Goals
Gala Fairydean Rovers (loan)	2018–19	Lowland League (Note: Appearance data in the Lowland League not available)			3	4	—				3	4
East Kilbride	2019–20	Lowland League			3	3	4	0			7	3
Stranraer	2020–21	Scottish League Two	21	6	3	1	4	2	2 (Note: Appearances in Scottish League Two play-offs)	0	30	9
Queen of the South	2021–22	Scottish Championship	34	3	2	1	4	2	5 (Note: Appearances in Scottish Challenge Cup)	2	45	8
Queen of the South	2022–23	Scottish League One	36	22	1	0	5	3	4	0	46	25
Queen of the South	Total		70	25	3	1	9	5	9	2	91	33
Queen's Park	2023–24	Scottish Championship	36	17	1	0	4	4	2	1	43	22
Port Vale	2024–25	League Two	19	1	1	0	1	1	3 (Note: Appearance in EFL Trophy)	1	24	3
Port Vale	2025–26	League One	13	1	2	2	2	0	5	3	22	6
Port Vale	Total		32	2	3	2	3	1	8	4	46	9
Dundee United (loan)	2024–25	Scottish Premiership	12	0	1	0	—		—		13	0
St Johnstone (loan)	2025–26	Scottish Championship	13	5	—		—		1	0	14	5
St Johnstone	2026–27	Scottish Premiership	0	0	0	0	0	0	—		0	0
St Johnstone	Total		13	5	0	0	0	0	1	0	14	5
Career total			184	55	17	11	24	12	22	7	247	85

== Honours ==
Queen of the South

- Scottish Challenge Cup runner-up: 2021–22

Port Vale

- EFL League Two second-place promotion: 2024–25

St Johnstone

- Scottish Championship: 2025–26

Individual

- PFA Scotland Team of the Year: 2022–23 League One, 2023–24 Championship
