= Josh Todd =

Josh Todd may refer to:

- Josh Todd (footballer) (born 1994), English footballer
- Josh Todd (musician) (born 1970), American musician, singer, songwriter and actor
