= Max Johnston (footballer) =

Scottish footballer (born 2003)

Personal information
- Full name: Max Johnston
- Date of birth: 26 December 2003 (age 22)
- Place of birth: Middlesbrough, England
- Height: 1.80 m (5 ft 11 in)
- Position: Right-back

Team information
- Current team: Derby County
- Number: 22

Youth career
- –2021: Motherwell

Senior career*
Years	Team	Apps	(Gls)
2021–2023	Motherwell	19	(3)
2021–2022	→ Queen of the South (loan)	25	(2)
2022	→ Cove Rangers (loan)	11	(0)
2023–2025	Sturm Graz	47	(2)
2023	Sturm Graz II	7	(0)
2025–	Derby County	23	(0)

International career^{‡}
2019	Scotland U16	1	(1)
2022	Scotland U19	2	(0)
2022–2024	Scotland U21	10	(1)
2025–	Scotland	4	(0)
- * Club domestic league appearances and goals as of 22:24, 6 November 2026 (UTC) ‡ National team caps and goals as of 07:17, 9 September 2025 (UTC)

Max Johnston (born 26 December 2003) is a Scottish professional footballer who plays as a right-back for EFL Championship club Derby County and the Scotland national team.

Johnston started his career at the Motherwell academy, making his senior debut in 2021, where he also had loan spells at Queen of the South and Cove Rangers. In 2023, Johnston moved to Austria to sign with Sturm Graz where he would stay for two years, before moving to England to sign with Derby County.

== Club career ==
=== Motherwell ===
Johnston signed for Motherwell at 12 years old, progressing through the club's academy system, then joining up with the first-team squad ahead of the 2020–21 season. Johnston debuted for the Steelmen on 13 February 2021, as a substitute in the Lanarkshire derby versus Hamilton Academical.

On 1 September 2021, Johnston signed for Queen of the South on a season long loan deal, with the former Doonhamers manager being his father Allan. He was then loaned to Cove Rangers in September 2022. After making 10 appearances with Cove, Johnston was recalled on 1 January 2023. He then became a regular in the Motherwell first team, and won the SFWA Young Player of the Year award for 2022–23.

=== Sturm Graz ===
On 25 July 2023, Austrian Bundesliga club Sturm Graz announced the signing of Johnston on a contract until the summer of 2027.

Johnston made 65 appearances for Sturm Graz, scoring two goals and whilst at the club he won the Austrian Bundesliga in 2024 and 2025 and the Austrian Cup in 2024.

=== Derby County ===
On 27 August 2025, Johnston signed with EFL Championship club Derby County on a four-year contract after Derby agreed an undisclosed fee with Sturm Graz for Johnston's services. On 30 August 2025, Johnston made his debut for Derby in a 2–2 league draw at Ipswich Town. Johnston sustained a hamstring injury on 25 October 2025 in a match against Queens Park Rangers. Johnston was set to return to action in January 2026, however he picked up a calf injury in training which extended his stay on the sidelines. Johnston returned to action in April 2026 and made 15 appearances during his first season at Derby County.

== International career ==
Johnston represented Scotland at under-16 level, scoring on his debut versus Australia in 2019. On 17 March 2022, Johnston was called up late to the Scotland under-19 squad.

He was added to the full Scotland squad for the first time in October 2023, following withdrawals by Aaron Hickey and Andrew Robertson. He made his senior debut on 20 March 2025 as a late substitute for Billy Gilmour in a UEFA Nations League victory over Greece.

== Personal life ==
Johnston's father is former Scotland international Allan; his uncle Sammy was also a footballer.

== Career statistics ==
=== Club ===
As of match played 3 November 2026

Appearances and goals by club, season and competition
Club	Season	League			National cup (Note: Includes Scottish Cup, Austrian Cup, FA Cup)		League cup (Note: Includes Scottish League Cup, EFL Cup)		Continental		Other		Total	
Club	Season	Division	Apps	Goals	Apps	Goals	Apps	Goals	Apps	Goals	Apps	Goals	Apps	Goals
Motherwell	2020–21	Scottish Premiership	2	0	0	0	0	0	0	0	–		2	0
Motherwell	2021–22	Scottish Premiership	0	0	0	0	0	0	–		–		0	0
Motherwell	2022–23	Scottish Premiership	17	3	2	0	0	0	0	0	–		19	3
Motherwell	Total		19	3	2	0	0	0	0	0	–		21	3
Queen of the South (loan)	2021–22	Scottish Championship	25	2	2	0	0	0	–		4 (Note: Appearances in Scottish Challenge Cup)	1	31	3
Cove Rangers (loan)	2022–23	Scottish Championship	11	0	0	0	0	0	–		–		11	0
Sturm Graz	2023–24	Austrian Bundesliga	20	0	2	0	–		7 (Note: One appearance in UEFA Champions League, two appearances in UEFA Europa League, four appearances in UEFA Europa Conference League)	0	–		29	0
Sturm Graz	2024–25	Austrian Bundesliga	24	1	2	0	–		5 (Note: Appearances in UEFA Champions League)	0	–		31	1
Sturm Graz	2025–26	Austrian Bundesliga	3	1	1	0	–		1 (Note: One appearance in UEFA Champions League)	0	–		5	1
Sturm Graz	Total		47	2	5	0	0	0	13	0	–		65	2
Sturm Graz II	2023–24	2. Liga	7	0	–		–		–		–		7	0
Derby County	2025–26	EFL Championship	15	0	0	0	–		–		–		15	0
Derby County	2026–27	EFL Championship	8	0	0	0	1	0	–		–		9	0
Derby County	Total		23	0	0	0	1	0	–		–		24	0
Career total			132	7	9	0	1	0	13	0	4	1	159	8

=== International ===
As of match played 8 September 2025

Appearances and goals by national team and year
National team	Year	Apps	Goals
Scotland	2025	4	0
Total		4	0

== Honours ==
Sturm Graz

- Austrian Cup: 2023–24
- Austrian Football Bundesliga: 2023–24, 2024-25

Individual

- SFWA Young Player of the Year: 2022–23
