= Sammy Johnston =

Scottish footballer (1967–2025)

Personal information
- Full name: Samuel Johnston
- Date of birth: 13 April 1967
- Place of birth: Glasgow, Scotland
- Date of death: 14 August 2025 (aged 58)
- Height: 5 ft 9 in (1.75 m)
- Position: Midfielder

Youth career
- Eastercraigs Boys Club
- Bishopbriggs Boys Club

Senior career*
Years	Team	Apps	(Gls)
1984–1990	St Johnstone	201	(33)
1990–1991	Ayr United	24	(9)
1991–1993	Partick Thistle	53	(4)
1993	Ballymena United	11	(1)
1994	Stranraer	2	(0)
1994–1997	Glenavon	117	(37)
1997	Finn Harps	21	(7)
1998	Coleraine	13	(1)
1998–1999	Partick Thistle	21	(2)
1999–2001	Pollok	72	(16)
Total		600	(122)

Managerial career
- 2005–2008: Neilston Juniors
- 2008-2010: Arthurlie Juniors
- * Club domestic league appearances and goals

Samuel Johnston (13 April 1967 – 14 August 2025) was a Scottish professional footballer who played as a midfielder for clubs including St Johnstone, Partick Thistle and Glenavon.

== Career ==
Johnston began his professional career as a teenager with St Johnstone, playing over 200 times for the Perth club including the semi-final of the 1988–89 Scottish Cup when the part-time, second-tier side took champions-elect Rangers to a replay, and a match described as 'McDiarmid Park's greatest' when closest challengers Airdrieonians were defeated to virtually confirm the 1989–90 Scottish First Division title and promotion to the Premier Division.

Johnston's contribution for the Saints in the top flight consisted of one appearance as a substitute against Dundee United in August 1990 before he quickly returned to the First Division upon being signed by Ayr United. He stayed at Somerset Park for less than a season before switching to Partick Thistle in a swap deal involving Cammy Duncan in March 1991. He was involved in another successful promotion run with the Jags as they finished runners-up in the 1991–92 Scottish First Division, followed by a solid Premier Division campaign in 1992–93, although by then Johnston was out of favour. After departing from Firhill, he had short spells with Ballymena United in Northern Ireland and Stranraer in Scotland, before crossing the Irish Sea for a longer period, playing in the Irish League for Glenavon – where he had a car park fistfight with opponent Pat McAllister, scored in the 1995–96 UEFA Cup and won the Irish Cup in 1997 – and Coleraine, and in the League of Ireland for Finn Harps.

In 1998 he returned to Partick Thistle, now in the third tier, then dropped into the Junior leagues to join Pollok. After retiring from playing, he later managed Neilston Juniors for three years (leading them to the SJFA West Region Premiership) and was assistant to Mark Cameron at Arthurlie.

== Personal life and death ==
His younger brother Allan (a Scottish international with 18 caps) and nephew Max also played professionally.

Sammy Johnston died on 14 August 2025, at the age of 58 after an illness.

== See also ==
- List of Scottish football families
- List of St Johnstone F.C. players
