= Harry Cochrane =

Scottish footballer (born 2001)

Personal information
- Date of birth: 24 April 2001 (age 25)
- Place of birth: Glasgow, Scotland
- Position: Midfielder

Team information
- Current team: Greenock Morton
- Number: 47

Youth career
- 2011–2013: Rangers
- 2014–2017: Heart of Midlothian

Senior career*
Years	Team	Apps	(Gls)
2017–2021	Heart of Midlothian	30	(1)
2019–2020	→ Dunfermline Athletic (loan)	12	(0)
2020–2021	→ Montrose (loan)	13	(0)
2021–2025	Queen of the South	103	(6)
2025–2026	Arbroath	35	(1)
2026–	Greenock Morton	0	(0)

International career
2015	Scotland U14	3	(0)
2015	Scotland U15	1	(0)
2016–2017	Scotland U16	5	(0)
2018	Scotland U17	3	(0)
2018–2019	Scotland U19	5	(0)
- * Club domestic league appearances and goals as of 4 May 2026

Harry Cochrane (born 24 April 2001) is a Scottish footballer who plays as a midfielder for Greenock Morton. Cochrane has previously played for Heart of Midlothian, Queen of the South, and Arbroath, as well as loan spells with Dunfermline Athletic and Montrose.

== Career ==
=== Youth football ===
Cochrane attended Kirklandpark Primary in Strathaven and later studied at Grange Academy, Kilmarnock where he was part of the Scottish Football Association Performance School. Cochrane began his football career with Rangers, before transferring to Heart of Midlothian at under-13 level.

=== Heart of Midlothian ===
In June 2017 Cochrane signed a professional contract with Heart of Midlothian, which committed him to the club until 2020. The following month he played in all four of the first team's pre season friendlies, netting in a 4–1 win against Linfield. On 15 August 2017, Cochrane played for Hearts Under-20s in the Scottish Challenge Cup against Formartine United. He made his first team debut for Hearts, aged 16, on 30 September 2017, playing from the start in a 2–1 defeat against Dundee at Dens Park. In doing so he became the first Scottish Football Association Performance School graduate to start a Scottish Premiership game.

Cochrane scored the opening goal in Hearts' 4–0 win over Celtic on 17 December 2017, a result that ended Celtic's 69-game unbeaten run in domestic matches. In doing so he became the club's youngest league goalscorer. The following week he was sent off in a match against St Johnstone for a second bookable offence. In April 2018, Cochrane signed a new contract with Hearts, which ran until 2021.

==== Dunfermline loan ====
Cochrane, along with Hearts teammate Anthony McDonald, moved on a season-long loan to Scottish Championship side Dunfermline Athletic on 30 August 2019.

==== Montrose loan ====
On 30 October 2020, Cochrane joined Scottish League One club Montrose on loan until January 2021. The loan agreement was later extended to the end of the season.

In April 2021, it was announced that Cochrane was set to leave Hearts at the end of the season following the expiration of his contract.

=== Queen of the South ===
On 24 July 2021, Cochrane signed a two-year deal with Scottish Championship club Queen of the South after a successful trial period.

On 24 May 2023, Cochrane signed a contract extension with the Doonhamers until 31 May 2025.

During September 2023, Cochrane was appointed Queens new club captain, after Josh Todd decided to concentrate more on his own playing performances.

=== Arbroath ===
After spending four years with the Doonhamers, Cochrane joined Scottish Championship club Arbroath in July 2025.

Greenock Morton

On 25 June, 2026, Cochrane was announced as a new signing for Championship side Greenock Morton, where he signed a one-year deal.

== International career ==
He was a member of the Scotland under-16 Victory Shield squad. He was called up to represent Scotland at under-17 level in October 2017, however was withdrawn from the squad by Hearts manager Craig Levein, as he felt the "experience of being involved and perhaps playing in the first team at this minute in his career is more valuable than playing an international game."

== Career statistics ==
As of 22 September 2023

Appearances and goals by club, season and competition
Club	Season	League			Scottish Cup		League Cup		Other		Total	
Club	Season	Division	Apps	Goals	Apps	Goals	Apps	Goals	Apps	Goals	Apps	Goals
Heart of Midlothian	2017–18	Scottish Premiership	22	1	2	0	0	0	—		24	1
Heart of Midlothian	2018–19	Scottish Premiership	8	0	0	0	0	0	—		8	0
Heart of Midlothian	2019–20	Scottish Premiership	0	0	0	0	0	0	—		0	0
Heart of Midlothian	2020–21	Scottish Championship	0	0	0	0	1	0	—		1	0
Heart of Midlothian	Total		30	1	2	0	1	0	0	0	33	1
Heart of Midlothian U20/U21 (Note: Matches in the Scottish Challenge Cup, in which age-restricted teams from the SPFL Premiership clubs compete against senior clubs.)	2017–18		—						2	0	2	0
Heart of Midlothian U20/U21	2018–19		—						1	0	1	0
Heart of Midlothian U20/U21	2019–20		—						3	0	3	0
Heart of Midlothian U20/U21	Total		0	0	0	0	0	0	6	0	6	0
Dunfermline Athletic (loan)	2019–20	Scottish Championship	12	0	0	0	0	0	—		12	0
Montrose (loan)	2020–21	Scottish League One	13	0	2	0	0	0	—		15	0
Queen of the South	2021–22	Scottish Championship	21	0	1	0	0	0	4	0	26	0
Queen of the South	2022–23	Scottish League One	27	3	1	0	5	0	3	0	36	3
Queen of the South	2023–24	Scottish League One	5	0	0	0	3	1	1	0	9	1
Queen of the South	Total		53	3	2	0	8	1	8	0	71	4
Career total			118	4	6	0	9	1	14	0	147	5
