= Matej Poplatnik =

Slovenian footballer (born 1992)

Personal information
- Date of birth: 15 July 1992 (age 34)
- Place of birth: Ljubljana, Slovenia
- Height: 1.78 m (5 ft 10 in)
- Position: Forward

Team information
- Current team: Triglav Kranj

Youth career
- –2005: Domžale
- 2006–2008: Slovan
- 2008–2009: Olimpija Ljubljana

Senior career*
Years	Team	Apps	(Gls)
2010–2012	Zarica Kranj		
2012–2015	Triglav Kranj	75	(24)
2013	→ Zarica Kranj (loan)	3	(1)
2015	Montana	14	(0)
2016–2018	Triglav Kranj	68	(46)
2018–2020	Kerala Blasters	16	(4)
2019–2020	→ Kaposvári Rákóczi (loan)	6	(0)
2020–2022	Livingston	19	(0)
2021–2022	→ Raith Rovers (loan)	31	(7)
2022–2023	Ilirija 1911	24	(24)
2023–2025	Bravo	71	(24)
2025–2026	Celje	20	(6)
2026–	Triglav Kranj	0	(0)

International career
2013	Slovenia U20	1	(0)
2013	Slovenia U21	1	(0)
2024	Slovenia	1	(0)
- * Club domestic league appearances and goals as of 7 September 2026

Matej Poplatnik (born 15 July 1992) is a Slovenian footballer who plays as a forward for Triglav Kranj.

== Club career ==
Poplatnik started his senior career with Zarica Kranj, before joining Triglav Kranj in 2012. He made his Slovenian PrvaLiga debut for Triglav in a 1–0 away loss against Celje on 15 July 2012, coming on as a second-half substitute. Poplatnik scored his first goal for Triglav a week later in a 1–0 win over Aluminij at Stanko Mlakar Stadium. In the 2014–15 season, he finished as Slovenian Second League top scorer with 18 goals.

On 20 June 2015, Poplatnik signed a two-year contract with Bulgarian side Montana, after a successful trial period with the club.

On 8 July 2018, Poplatnik joined Indian Super League club Kerala Blasters. He scored on his debut, in a 2–0 league away victory against ATK on 29 September 2018.

On 30 July 2019, Poplatnik joined Hungarian club Kaposvári Rákóczi on a season-long loan.

On 8 July 2020, Poplatnik signed for Scottish Premiership club Livingston. He would join Scottish Championship side Raith Rovers on a season-long loan. For Raith Rovers, Poplatnik scored eleven goals in all competitions, including two goals in a victory in the 2022 Scottish Challenge Cup final.

== International career ==
Poplatnik made his debut for the senior Slovenia national team on 20 January 2024 in a friendly against the United States.

== Personal life ==
His older brother, Aleš Poplatnik, is also a footballer.

== Honours ==
Triglav Kranj

- Slovenian Second League: 2016–17

Raith Rovers

- Scottish Challenge Cup: 2021–22

Celje

- Slovenian PrvaLiga: 2025–26
