= Ally Roy =

Scottish footballer

Personal information
- Full name: Alistair Roy
- Date of birth: 26 May 1997 (age 29)
- Place of birth: Airdrie, Scotland
- Height: 1.88 m (6 ft 2 in)
- Position: Striker

Youth career
- Kilsyth Rangers
- –2014: Stirling Albion

Senior career*
Years	Team	Apps	(Gls)
2014–2018	Heart of Midlothian	1	(0)
2015–2016	→ East Stirlingshire (loan)	14	(4)
2016–2017	→ Stenhousemuir (loan)	28	(3)
2017–2018	→ Dumbarton (loan)	16	(2)
2018	→ Sligo Rovers (loan)	17	(2)
2018	Derry City	11	(2)
2019	Partick Thistle	4	(0)
2019–2021	Airdrieonians	33	(5)
2021–2022	Queen of the South	26	(4)
2022–2023	Glentoran	20	(1)
2023	→ Greenock Morton (loan)	6	(0)
2023–2024	East Kilbride	6	(2)
2024	→ Alloa Athletic (loan)	17	(5)
2024–2025	Stirling Albion	16	(1)
2025–2026	Dumbarton	27	(2)

International career
2018	Northern Ireland U21	3	(0)
- * Club domestic league appearances and goals as of 07:17, 26 April 2026 (UTC)

Alistair Roy (born 26 May 1997) is a professional footballer who last played as a striker for Scottish League Two side Dumbarton. Born in Scotland, he represented Northern Ireland internationally at junior level.

== Career ==
Roy was born in Airdrie. On 20 August 2014, Roy debuted for the Hearts first-team at the age of 17, coming on as a 65th-minute substitute in a Scottish Challenge Cup match versus Livingston, replacing Liam Gordon in a 4–1 defeat. Roy went on to make his league debut in a victory over Raith Rovers on 23 August 2014.

In July 2015, Roy moved out on loan to Scottish League Two club East Stirlingshire until January 2016. Roy signed a new one-year deal with the Jambos in March 2016, and was loaned out to Scottish League One club Stenhousemuir at the beginning of the 2016–17 season.

After signing a new contract with Hearts in the summer of 2017, he joined Scottish Championship club Dumbarton on loan until January 2018. Roy scored his first goal for the Sons in a 1–1 draw with Falkirk in August 2017. After making 25 appearances for the Sons, scoring three goals, Roy returned to Hearts in January 2018. Roy was then loaned out to Irish club Sligo Rovers in February 2018, on a deal due to run until 30 June 2018.

Roy departed Hearts and signed for Derry City in July 2018, where he remained for the duration of the League of Ireland season before joining Scottish Championship club Partick Thistle in January 2019.

This allowed him his first taste of European football as he featured in both legs of the club's 2018–19 UEFA Europa League tie against Dinamo Minsk of Belarus. Derry lost the first leg 2–0 at home. Roy scored in the away leg as Derry bowed out despite winning the game.

On 10 June 2019, Roy signed for Airdrieonians, where he remained for two seasons until 31 May 2021.

On 10 June 2021, Roy signed for Scottish Championship club Queen of the South in a one-year deal. On 24 July 2021, Roy scored his first hat-trick for the Doonhamers at Palmerston in the Premier Sports Cup versus Airdrieonians in a 4–1 win. Following relegation to Scottish League One, Roy was released by the club at the end of the 2021–22 season.

On 1 June 2022, Roy signed a two-year deal with Glentoran. On 10 January 2023, Roy joined Scottish Championship club Greenock Morton on loan until the end of the season. After spells with East Kilbride, Alloa Athletic and Stirling Albion, Roy joined Dumbarton for a second spell in the summer of 2025. He played 39 times, scoring three goals, before leaving the club after a season.

== Career statistics ==
As of 07:17, 26 April 2026 (UTC)

Appearances and goals by club, season and competition
Club	Season	League			National Cup		League Cup		Other		Total	
Club	Season	Division	Apps	Goals	Apps	Goals	Apps	Goals	Apps	Goals	Apps	Goals
Heart of Midlothian	2014–15	Scottish Championship	1	0	0	0	0	0	1	0	2	0
Heart of Midlothian	2015–16	Scottish Premiership	0	0	0	0	0	0	0	0	0	0
Heart of Midlothian	2016–17	Scottish Premiership	0	0	0	0	0	0	2	0	2	0
Heart of Midlothian	2017–18	Scottish Premiership	0	0	0	0	0	0	0	0	0	0
Heart of Midlothian	Total		1	0	0	0	0	0	3	0	4	0
East Stirlingshire (loan)	2015–16	Scottish League Two	14	4	1	0	1	0	0	0	16	4
Stenhousemuir (loan)	2016–17	Scottish League One	28	3	2	0	0	0	0	0	30	3
Dumbarton (loan)	2017–18	Scottish Championship	16	2	1	0	4	0	4	1	25	3
Sligo Rovers (loan)	2018	League of Ireland Premier Division	17	2	0	0	1	0	0	0	18	2
Derry City	2018	LOI Premier Division	11	2	3	5	0	0	2 (Note: Appearances in UEFA Europa League)	1	16	8
Partick Thistle	2018–19	Scottish Championship	4	0	1	0	0	0	0	0	5	0
Airdrieonians	2019–20	Scottish League One	20	2	0	0	4	3	3	0	27	5
Airdrieonians	2020–21	Scottish League One	13	3	1	0	1	0	3	0	18	3
Airdrieonians	Total		33	5	1	0	5	3	6	1	45	8
Queen of the South	2021–22	Scottish Championship	26	4	2	0	4	6	4	2	36	12
Glentoran	2022–23	NIFL Premiership	15	1	0	0	0	0	0	0	15	1
Greenock Morton (loan)	2022–23	Scottish Championship	6	0	1	0	0	0	0	0	7	0
Alloa Athletic	2023–24	Scottish League One	17	5	2	0	0	0	0	0	19	5
Stirling Albion	2024–25	Scottish League Two	16	1	1	0	4	1	1	0	22	2
Dumbarton	2025–26	Scottish League Two	27	2	2	0	4	1	6	0	39	3
Dumbarton	Dumbarton total (both spells)		43	4	3	0	8	1	10	1	64	6
Career total			231	31	17	5	23	11	26	4	297	51
