= Josh Debayo =

Nigerian footballer (born 1996)

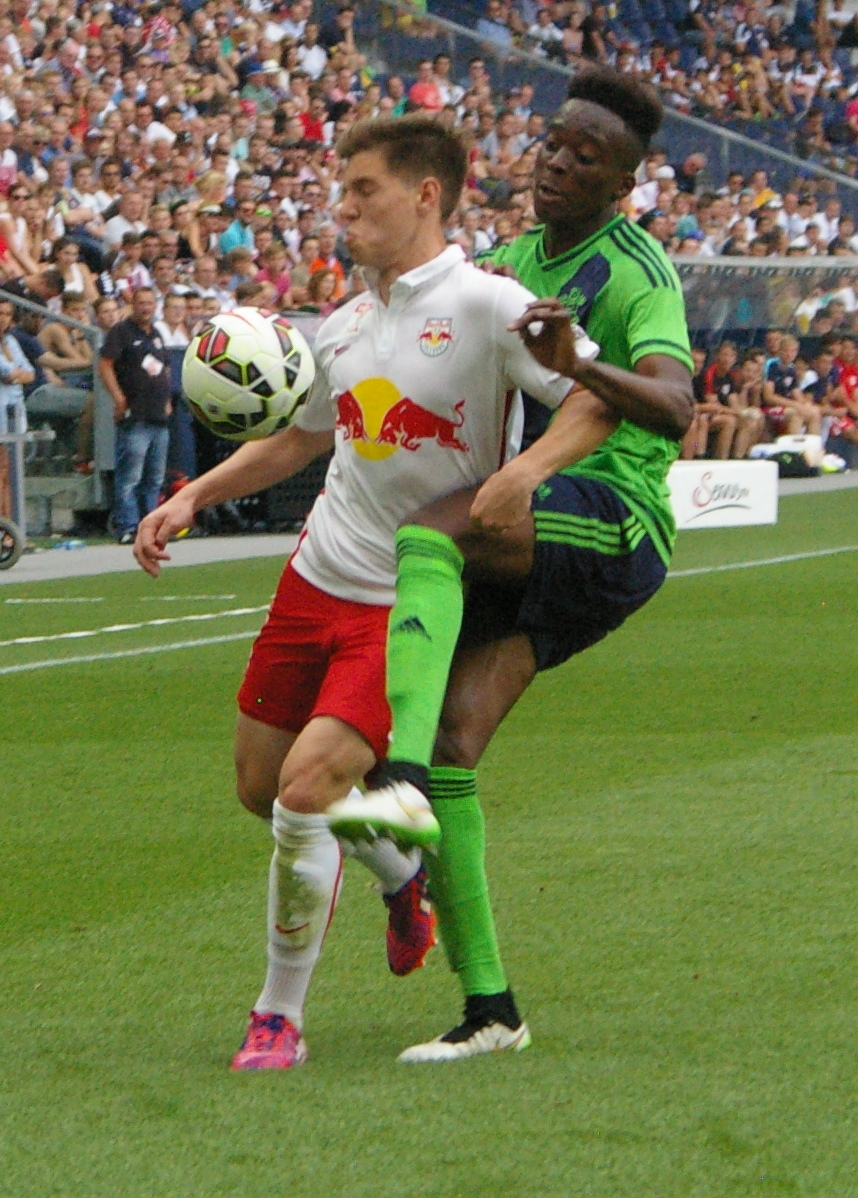
- Debayo (right) attempting to tackle Michael Brandner (left) in July 2015.

Personal information
- Full name: Joshua Akinkunmi Debayo
- Date of birth: 17 October 1996 (age 30)
- Place of birth: London, England
- Height: 6 ft 0 in (1.83 m)
- Position: Defender

Youth career
- Fulham
- Chelsea
- 2013–2016: Southampton
- 2016–2018: Leicester City

Senior career*
Years	Team	Apps	(Gls)
2018–2020	Cheltenham Town	12	(0)
2018–2019	→ Dover Athletic (loan)	16	(0)
2020–2021	Wealdstone	1	(0)
2021–2022	Queen of the South	23	(0)
2023–2024	Alloa Athletic	8	(0)
- * Club domestic league appearances and goals as of 27 January 2024

Joshua Akinkunmi Debayo (born 17 October 1996) is a Nigerian professional footballer who plays as a defender.

== Career ==
After playing youth football for Fulham, Chelsea, Southampton and Leicester City, Debayo signed with Cheltenham Town in July 2018.

On 11 October 2018, Debayo signed for Dover Athletic on loan until January 2019. Debayo debuted for the club two days later in a 2–2 away draw versus Harrogate Town. On 4 January 2019, Debayo signed a loan extension until the end of the 2018–19 season.

Debayo was offered a new contract by the Robins at the end of the 2019–20 season, although he rejected the offer and departed the club. Debayo then signed for Wealdstone on 19 December 2020. On 4 February 2021, Debayo departed the Royals after making just one league appearance for the club.

On 27 July 2021, Debayo signed a one-year contract with Scottish Championship club Queen of the South. Following relegation to Scottish League One, Debayo was released by the club at the end of the 2021–22 season.

On 18 July 2023, Debayo signed a one-year contract with Alloa Athletic.

== Career statistics ==
As of 27 December 2024

Appearances and goals by club, season and competition
Season	Club	League			National Cup		League Cup		Other		Total	
Season	Club	Division	Apps	Goals	Apps	Goals	Apps	Goals	Apps	Goals	Apps	Goals
Leicester City	2016–17	Premier League	0	0	0	0	0	0	3 (Note: Appearance(s) in Football League Trophy)	0	3	0
Leicester City	2017–18	Premier League	0	0	0	0	0	0	1	0	1	0
Leicester City	Total		0	0	0	0	0	0	4	0	4	0
Cheltenham Town	2018–19	League Two	5	0	0	0	2	0	0	0	7	0
Cheltenham Town	2019–20	League Two	7	0	0	0	1	0	1	0	9	0
Cheltenham Town	Total		12	0	0	0	3	0	1	0	16	0
Dover Athletic (loan)	2018–19	National League	16	0	2	0	—		2 (Note: Appearance in the FA Trophy.)	0	20	0
Wealdstone	2020–21	National League	1	0	0	0	—		0	0	1	0
Queen of the South	2021–22	Scottish Championship	23	0	0	0	0	0	3	0	26	0
Alloa Athletic	2023–24	Scottish League One	8	0	0	0	3	0	0	0	11	0
Career total			60	0	2	0	6	0	10	0	78	0
