= Euan East =

Scottish Catholic footballer

Personal information
- Date of birth: 5 July 2000 (age 26)
- Place of birth: Paisley, Scotland
- Height: 6 ft 0 in (1.83 m)
- Position: Centre back

Team information
- Current team: East Kilbride
- Number: 16

Youth career
- 2010–2017: St Mirren

Senior career*
Years	Team	Apps	(Gls)
2017–2018	Johnstone Burgh	0	(0)
2018–2019	Queen's Park	22	(1)
2019–2020	Albion Rovers	26	(7)
2020–2023	Queen of the South	77	(9)
2023–2026	Linfield	73	(4)
2026–	East Kilbride	6	(0)
- * Club domestic league appearances and goals as of 18 October 2026

Euan East (born 5 July 2000) is a Scottish professional footballer who plays as a centre back for Scottish League One side East Kilbride. East has previously played for Queen's Park, Albion Rovers, Queen of the South and Linfield.

== Club career ==
=== Queen's Park ===
East started his senior career at Queen's Park, where he was primarily used as a substitute, scoring one goal in the 2018–19 season.

=== Albion Rovers ===
On 11 July 2019, East signed for Albion Rovers. East scored seven league goals during his solitary season for the Coatbridge club. At the end of that season, East rejected a contract offer from the Wee Rovers, instead preferring to chase a full-time contract elsewhere.

=== Queen of the South ===
On 25 September 2020, East signed a full-time contract with Queen of the South before the start of the 2020–21 season. On 17 October 2020, East's league debut for the Doonhamers was in a 2–1 defeat versus Ayr United at Somerset Park. East had already played in two Betfred League Cup matches versus Greenock Morton and St Mirren earlier in October 2020.

On 10 November 2020, East scored his first goal for the Doonhamers versus Queen's Park, his first club, at Hampden Park in a 3-1 victory in the League Cup.

On 9 June 2021, East signed a one-year extension to his contract to remain at the Doonhamers for the 2021-22 season, where he has reverted from playing as a striker to a centre back.

On 8 April 2022, East was the captain versus Partick Thistle at Palmerston in a 1-0 defeat, in the absence of club captain Josh Todd due to injury.

On 16 April 2022, East once again captain versus Arbroath at Gayfield in a 5-1 defeat.

On 19 April 2022, East scored the winning goal in the 40th minute, as Queens won 2-1 versus Inverness Caledonian Thistle at Palmerston.

On 23 April 2022, East scored for Queens in the 80th minute, then scored an own goal in the 87th minute versus Ayr United in a 1-1 draw at Palmerston, that ultimately relegated the Doonhamers to League One.

On 15 June 2022, East signed a one-year extension to his existing contract to remain with the Doonhamers.

On 31 May 2023, East departed Queen of the South after three seasons with the Dumfries club.

=== Linfield ===
On 1 September 2023, East signed with Linfield on a contract until the end of the 23/24 season. He scored two goals for the club, against Larne and in the dying moments of their league against Crusaders. On 15 January 2024, Linfield announced that East had signed a new contract with the club, keeping him at Windsor Park until the conclusion of the 2024/25 campaign.

=== East Kilbride ===
On 3 September 2026, East signed for Scottish League One side East Kilbride.

== Career statistics ==
=== Club ===
As of 7 August 2024

Appearances and goals by club, season and competition
Club	Season	League			National Cup		League Cup		Continental		Other		Total	
Club	Season	Division	Apps	Goals	Apps	Goals	Apps	Goals	Apps	Goals	Apps	Goals	Apps	Goals
Queen's Park	2018-19	Scottish League Two	22	1	2	0	—		—		2 (Note: Appearance(s) in Scottish Challenge Cup)	1	26	2
Albion Rovers	2019-20	Scottish League Two	26	7	3	0	4	1	—		1	0	34	8
Queen of the South	2020-21	Scottish Championship	23	1	1	0	3	1	—		—		27	2
Queen of the South	2021-22	Scottish Championship	26	4	1	0	4	0	—		4	0	35	4
Queen of the South	2022-23	Scottish League One	28	4	1	0	2	0	—		2	0	33	4
Queen of the South	Total		77	9	3	0	9	1	—		6	0	95	10
Linfield	2023-24	NIFL Premiership	24	2	3	0	3	1	—		—		30	3
Linfield	2024-25	NIFL Premiership	—		—		—		0	0	—		0	0
Linfield	Total		24	2	3	0	3	1	0	0	—		30	3
Career Total			149	19	11	0	16	3	0	0	9	1	185	23
