= Ben Liddle =

English footballer (born 1998)

Personal information
- Full name: Ben George Liddle
- Date of birth: 21 September 1998 (age 28)
- Place of birth: Durham, England
- Height: 5 ft 7 in (1.70 m)
- Position: Central midfielder

Youth career
- –2016: Middlesbrough

Senior career*
| Years | Team | Apps | (Gls) |
| 2016–2020 | Middlesbrough | 1 | (0) |
| 2018 | → Blyth Spartans (loan) | 2 | (0) |
| 2019 | → Forest Green Rovers (loan) | 2 | (0) |
| 2020 | → Scunthorpe United (loan) | 4 | (0) |
| 2020–2022 | Bristol Rovers | 3 | (0) |
| 2021–2022 | → Queen of the South (loan) | 17 | (1) |
| 2022–2024 | Darlington | 61 | (7) |
- * Club domestic league appearances and goals as of 10:00, 22 April 2024 (UTC)

Ben George Liddle (born 21 September 1998) is an English former professional footballer who played as a central midfielder. He previous played in the Football League for Middlesbrough, Forest Green Rovers, Scunthorpe United and Bristol Rovers, in the Scottish Championship for Queen of the South, and in non-league football for Blyth Spartans and Darlington.

== Personal life ==
Liddle was born in 1998 in Durham. He is the son of Craig Liddle, who played as a centre back for Middlesbrough and Darlington.

== Club career ==
=== Middlesbrough ===
Liddle signed his first professional contract with Middlesbrough in the summer of 2016. Liddle appeared in the EFL Trophy for the Middlesbrough U23 side in both the 2017–18 and the 2018–19 competitions, featuring in all three group matches in each. He made his Championship debut for Middlesbrough on 30 November 2019, replacing Lewis Wing in the 70th minute of a 4–0 defeat at Leeds United. He made his first start for the club on 14 January 2020, playing 57 minutes of a 2–1 defeat away at Tottenham Hotspur in the FA Cup. This proved to be his last game for the club.

==== Blyth Spartans (loan) ====
On 22 March 2018, he joined National League North side Blyth Spartans on loan until the end of the season.

==== Forest Green Rovers (loan) ====
Liddle joined League Two club Forest Green Rovers on 31 January 2019 on loan until the end of the season. He made his debut on 12 February 2019, coming on as a substitute for Lloyd James in a 2–0 loss to Swindon Town at the County Ground.

==== Scunthorpe United (loan) ====
On 31 January 2020, Liddle joined another League Two club, Scunthorpe United, on loan until the end of the season. The following day he made his debut in the starting eleven away to Crawley Town, but was replaced at half-time with the score 3–0 to the hosts; the match ended 3–1. Liddle made another three appearances before the season was ended early due to the coronavirus pandemic.

=== Bristol Rovers ===
On 8 October 2020, Liddle joined Bristol Rovers for an undisclosed fee, signing a two-year deal. He made his debut on 7 November, coming on in the 73rd minute of a 2–1 FA Cup victory over Walsall. On 6 February 2021, Liddle made his league debut, and fourth appearance in all competitions, as he started before being replaced in the 65th minute of a 0–0 draw with Fleetwood Town.

He made one appearance in the 2021–22 EFL Cup before joining Scottish Championship club Queen of the South on a season-long loan. He made 19 appearances in all competitions, and scored his first senior goal, opening the scoring in a 3–3 draw away to Raith Rovers, before returning to Bristol Rovers, who released him when his contract expired at the end of the 2021–22 season.

=== Darlington ===
Having been without a club since leaving Bristol Rovers, Liddle signed for National League North club Darlington on 18 August 2022. He finished the season with six goals from 34 league appearances. He left the club when his contract expired at the end of the 2023–24 season.

== Career statistics ==
As of end of 2023–24 season

Appearances and goals by club, season and competition
| Club | Season | League | | | National cup (Note: Includes FA Cup, Scottish Cup) | | League cup (Note: Includes EFL Cup, Scottish League Cup) | | Other | | Total | |
| Club | Season | Division | Apps | Goals | Apps | Goals | Apps | Goals | Apps | Goals | Apps | Goals |
|---|---|---|---|---|---|---|---|---|---|---|---|---|
| Middlesbrough U21 | 2017–18 | — | — | | — | | — | | 3 (Note: Appearance(s) in EFL Trophy) | 0 | 3 | 0 |
| Middlesbrough U21 | 2018–19 | — | — | | — | | — | | 3 | 0 | 3 | 0 |
| Middlesbrough U21 | Total | | — | | — | | — | | 6 | 0 | 6 | 0 |
| Middlesbrough | 2017–18 | Championship | 0 | 0 | 0 | 0 | 0 | 0 | — | | 0 | 0 |
| Middlesbrough | 2018–19 | Championship | 0 | 0 | 0 | 0 | 0 | 0 | — | | 0 | 0 |
| Middlesbrough | 2019–20 | Championship | 1 | 0 | 1 | 0 | — | | — | | 2 | 0 |
| Middlesbrough | 2020–21 | Championship | 0 | 0 | — | | 0 | 0 | — | | 0 | 0 |
| Middlesbrough | Total | | 1 | 0 | 1 | 0 | 0 | 0 | 0 | 0 | 2 | 0 |
| Blyth Spartans (loan) | 2017–18 | National League North | 2 | 0 | — | | — | | — | | 2 | 0 |
| Forest Green Rovers (loan) | 2018–19 | League Two | 2 | 0 | — | | — | | 0 | 0 | 2 | 0 |
| Scunthorpe United (loan) | 2019–20 | League Two | 4 | 0 | — | | — | | — | | 4 | 0 |
| Bristol Rovers | 2020–21 | League One | 3 | 0 | 2 | 0 | — | | 1 | 0 | 6 | 0 |
| Bristol Rovers | 2021–22 | League Two | 0 | 0 | — | | 1 | 0 | 0 | 0 | 1 | 0 |
| Bristol Rovers | Total | | 3 | 0 | 2 | 0 | 1 | 0 | 1 | 0 | 7 | 0 |
| Queen of the South (loan) | 2021–22 | Scottish Championship | 17 | 1 | 0 | 0 | — | | 2 (Note: Appearances in Scottish Challenge Cup) | 0 | 19 | 1 |
| Darlington | 2022–23 | National League North | 34 | 6 | 2 | 0 | — | | 3 (Note: Appearances in FA Trophy) | 0 | 39 | 6 |
| Darlington | 2023–24 | National League North | 27 | 1 | 1 | 0 | — | | 0 | 0 | 28 | 1 |
| Darlington | Total | | 61 | 7 | 3 | 0 | — | | 3 | 0 | 67 | 7 |
| Career total | | | 90 | 8 | 6 | 0 | 1 | 0 | 12 | 0 | 109 | 8 |
