= Alex Clark (baseball) =

American baseball player

- Outfielder

Negro league baseball debut
- 1931, for the Louisville White Sox

Last appearance
- 1931, for the Louisville White Sox

Teams
- Louisville White Sox (1931)

Alex Clark was an American Negro league outfielder in the 1930s.

Clark played for the Louisville White Sox in 1931. In 12 recorded games, he posted six hits with a home run in 44 plate appearances.
