= Darragh O'Connor =

Irish footballer

Personal information
- Date of birth: 5 August 1999 (age 27)
- Place of birth: Croydon, England
- Height: 6 ft 2 in (1.88 m)
- Position: Central defender

Team information
- Current team: East Kilbride
- Number: 24

Youth career
- Cloughbawn
- Waterford
- Shamrock Rovers

Senior career*
Years	Team	Apps	(Gls)
2019	Wexford	20	(0)
2019–2021	Leicester City	0	(0)
2021–2022	Motherwell	1	(0)
2022	→ Queen of the South (loan)	15	(1)
2022–2024	Greenock Morton	53	(3)
2024–2026	York City	4	(0)
2025	→ Falkirk (loan)	1	(0)
2025–2026	→ Raith Rovers (loan)	23	(1)
2026–	East Kilbride	4	(1)
- * Club domestic league appearances and goals as of 27 August 2026

Darragh O'Connor (born 5 August 1999) is an Irish professional footballer who plays as a central defender for Scottish League One club East Kilbride.

== Early and personal life ==
O'Connor was born in Croydon, England to Irish parents and moved to Clonroche, County Wexford, Ireland in 2005. Some media have incorrectly reported him to have been born in Wexford.

== Career ==
O'Connor spent his early career with Cloughbawn, Waterford, Shamrock Rovers, and Wexford, before signing for Leicester City in 2019. O'Connor moved to Scottish Premiership club Motherwell in July 2021.

On 28 January 2022, O'Connor signed on loan for Dumfries club Queen of the South until the end of the 2021–22 season. He made a total of 17 appearances for the club in all competitions during his loan spell, scoring once.

On 25 May 2022, it was announced that O'Connor had signed a pre-contract agreement with Scottish Championship side Greenock Morton, signing on a permanent basis on a one-year contract. The contract was extended in February 2023 until summer of 2024.

On 25 June 2024, National League club York City announced that they had signed O'Connor upon the expiry of his contract at Greenock Morton. In January 2025, he joined Falkirk on loan for the remainder of the season. On 29 August 2025, O'Connor joined Raith Rovers on loan for the rest of the 2025–26 season.

On 11 May 2026, York announced it was releasing him. In July 2026, O'Connor transitioned to part-time football to "pursue other opportunities" and joined Scottish League One club East Kilbride. In his first league game for the club, O'Connor scored his first goal in a 5–1 rout of Queen of the South.

== Career statistics ==
As of 25 May 2022.

Club	Season	League			National Cup		League Cup		Other		Total	
Club	Season	Division	Apps	Goals	Apps	Goals	Apps	Goals	Apps	Goals	Apps	Goals
Wexford	2019	League of Ireland First Division	20	0	0	0	0	0	0	0	20	0
Leicester City	2019–20	Premier League	0	0	0	0	0	0	0	0	0	0
Leicester City	2020–21	Premier League	0	0	0	0	0	0	0	0	0	0
Leicester City	Total		0	0	0	0	0	0	0	0	0	0
Leicester City U23	2019–20	—			—		—		2 (Note: Appearances in the EFL Trophy.)	0	2	0
Leicester City U23	2020–21	—			—		—		4	0	4	0
Leicester City U23	Total		0	0	0	0	0	0	6	0	6	0
Motherwell	2021–22	Scottish Premiership	1	0	0	0	4	0	—		5	0
Queen of the South (loan)	2021–22	Scottish Championship	15	1	0	0	0	0	2	0	17	1
Greenock Morton	2022–23	Scottish Championship	0	0	0	0	0	0	0	0	0	0
Career total			36	1	0	0	4	0	8	0	48	1

== Honours ==
Raith Rovers

- Scottish Challenge Cup: 2025–26
