= Alex Clarke =

Alex Clarke may refer to:

- Alex Clarke (Australian footballer) (born 1907), Australian rules footballer
- Alex Clarke (netball) (born 1977), Australian retired netball player
- Alex Clarke (rugby union) (born 1981), rugby union player for London Scottish
- Alex Clarke (saxophonist) (born 1999), English saxophonist and jazz musician

== See also ==
- Alex Clark (disambiguation)
