= Sandy Clark =

Scottish footballer & coach (born 1956)

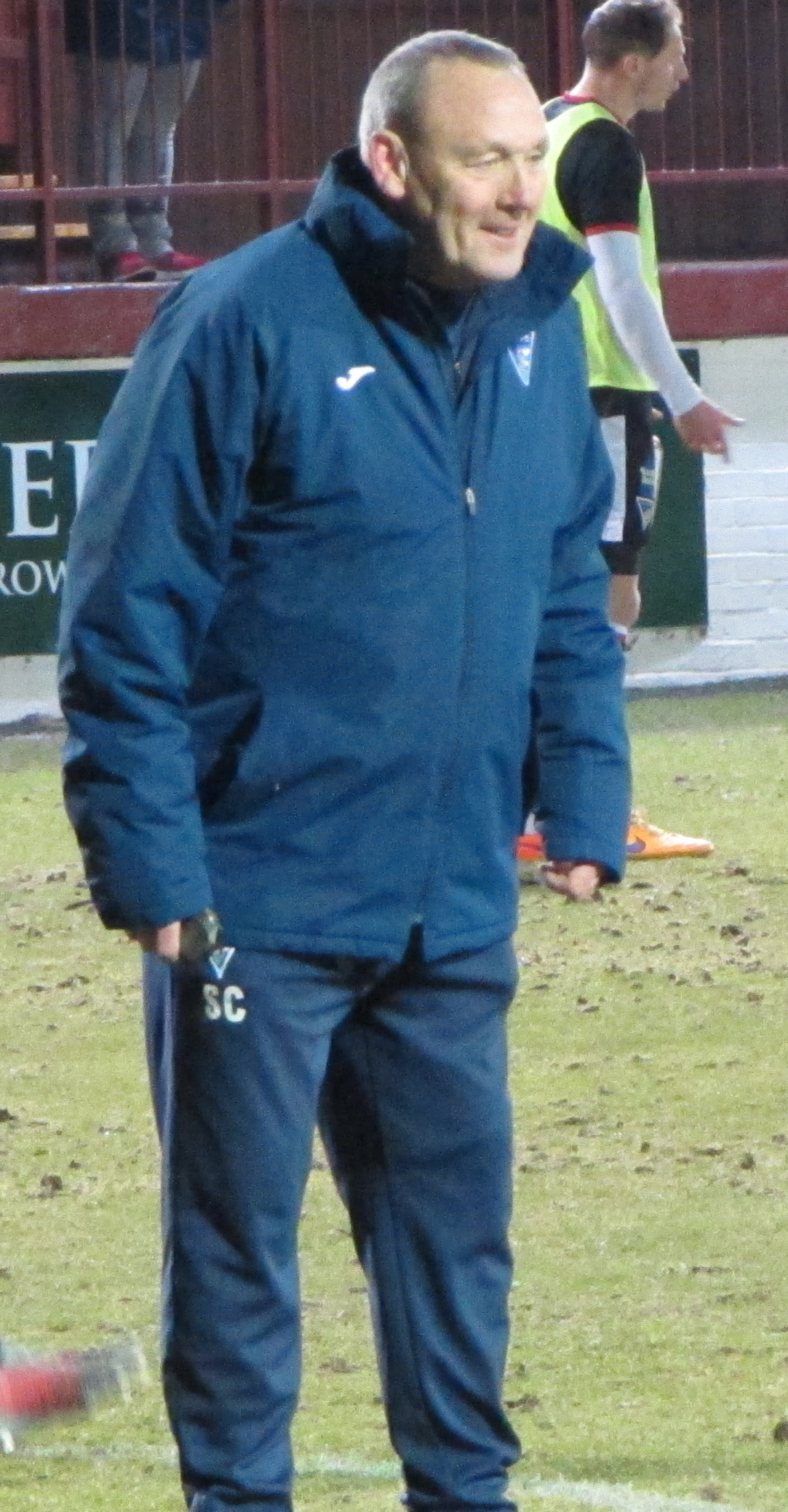

Personal information
- Full name: Alexander Clark
- Date of birth: 28 October 1956 (age 69)
- Place of birth: Airdrie, Scotland
- Position: Striker

Team information
- Current team: Queen of the South (assistant manager)

Senior career*
Years	Team	Apps	(Gls)
1974–1982	Airdrieonians	234	(92)
1982–1983	West Ham United	26	(7)
1983–1984	Rangers	62	(21)
1984–1989	Heart of Midlothian	136	(35)
1989–1990	Partick Thistle	3	(0)
1990	Dunfermline Athletic	4	(0)
Total		465	(155)

Managerial career
- 1989–1990: Partick Thistle
- 1993–1994: Heart of Midlothian
- 1996–1998: Hamilton Academical
- 1998–2001: St Johnstone
- 2004–2005: Berwick Rangers
- 2022–2023: East Stirlingshire
- 2023–2026: Albion Rovers
- * Club domestic league appearances and goals

Alexander Clark (born 28 October 1956) is a Scottish professional football manager and former player, who is an assistant-manager of Scottish Football League club Queen of the South.

== Career ==
Clark played for several clubs in his playing career including his home town club Airdrieonians, Rangers, Heart of Midlothian (Hearts) and West Ham United. His longest and most successful spells were those at Tynecastle and Broomfield. In 1982, Clark won the Scottish PFA Players' Player of the Year award. In 1984, Clark went on to win the Scottish League Cup final with Rangers in a 3–2 victory over Celtic.

He has managed several clubs, including Partick Thistle, Hamilton Academical, Hearts (twice, once as caretaker), St Johnstone and Berwick Rangers.

His work with BBC Scotland previously included TV commentary, where he was the regular summariser to main commentator Rob MacLean.

In 2005, Clark was appointed as a striker coach at Aberdeen. He left the club in May 2009, along with manager Jimmy Calderwood and assistant Jimmy Nicholl. In January 2010 he joined Kilmarnock as first team coach, working under the same management team until the end of the 2009–10 season. Clark was a sports performance lecturer at Cumbernauld College after leaving Kilmarnock.

Clark was appointed Queen of the South's assistant manager to Allan Johnston on 14 May 2012. Johnston and Clark signed a one-year contract extension on 13 April 2013, but then moved onto Kilmarnock as that club's new management team in June 2013. Clark left Kilmarnock in May 2014 and was appointed assistant manager to Darren Young at Albion Rovers in June 2014. At the end of the 2014–15 season, Clark departed Albion Rovers and was once again re-united with Allan Johnston, this time as assistant manager of Scottish Championship club Dunfermline Athletic. Johnston and Clark departed the Pars during January 2019 and returned to Dumfries club Queens for a second spell on 5 May 2019, after the departure of Gary Naysmith. Johnston and Clark joined on a two-year contract and their first game in-charge came in the Scottish Championship play-off first-leg versus Montrose. On 16 April 2021, Johnston and Clark signed a contract extension to remain the Doonhamers management team until May 2023. On 13 February 2022, Johnston and Clark departed the Doonhamers by mutual consent (4 wins in 24 matches) as the Dumfries club languished in the automatic relegation place in the Scottish Championship.

On 25 November 2022, Clark was appointed manager of Lowland League side East Stirlingshire. This was to be Clark's first managerial position since he departed Berwick Rangers in 2005.

On 28 March 2023, Clark would leave East Stirlingshire and was named the new manager of Scottish League Two club Albion Rovers.

On 25 May 2026, he was named as assistant-manager to his son Nicky at the Doonhamers.

== Personal life ==
Sandy Clark is the father of Nicky, who also played for Rangers.

=== Managerial record ===
As of 1 August 2023

Team	From	To	Record				
Team	From	To	G	W	D	L	Win %
Heart of Midlothian	10 May 1993	20 June 1994	51	15	20	16	29.41
Hamilton Academical	1 September 1996	5 September 1998	93	38	29	26	40.86
St Johnstone	7 September 1998	25 September 2001	132	40	43	49	30.30
Berwick Rangers	13 October 2004	31 May 2006	77	35	19	23	45.45
East Stirlingshire	25 November 2022	27 March 2023	15	6	2	7	40.00
Albion Rovers	28 March 2023	25 May 2026	14	4	2	8	28.57
Total			382	138	115	129	36.13

- Statistics from Partick Thistle unavailable.
