= Lee Connelly =

Scottish footballer (born 1999)

Personal information
- Date of birth: 18 October 1999 (age 27)
- Position: Striker

Youth career
- 2014–2016: Queen's Park
- 2016–2018: Sunderland

Senior career*
Years	Team	Apps	(Gls)
2018–2021	Sunderland	0	(0)
2019	→ South Shields (loan)	2	(0)
2020	→ Alloa Athletic (loan)	4	(1)
2020–2021	→ Alloa Athletic (loan)	12	(1)
2021–2024	Queen of the South	65	(11)
2024–2025	Clyde	7	(0)

International career^{‡}
2014	Scotland U15	2	(0)
2014	Scotland U16	2	(0)
2015–2016	Scotland U17	4	(0)
- * Club domestic league appearances and goals as of 02:43, 31 May 2025 (UTC) ‡ National team caps and goals as of 17:00, 16 September 2023 (UTC)

Lee Connelly (born 18 October 1999) is a Scottish professional footballer who plays as a striker. He has previously played for Sunderland, Queen of the South and Clyde, and has also had loan spells with South Shields and twice with Alloa Athletic.

== Club career ==
Connelly began his career with Queen's Park before moving to Sunderland in 2016. Connelly's senior debut was on 9 October 2018, in the EFL Trophy, alongside Jack Diamond. Connelly moved on loan to South Shields in August 2019, for whom he made 2 appearances, and Alloa Athletic in January 2020. Connelly was loaned again to Alloa in September 2020.

Connelly was released by Sunderland at the end of the season, and signed for Queen of the South in June 2021.

On 5 September 2021, he scored his first goal for Queens in the club's 3–0 win over Broomhill at Palmerston Park in the second round of the SPFL Trust Trophy.

On 11 September 2021, he scored his first league goal for Queens in the club's 1–0 win over Raith Rovers at Stark's Park in the 12th minute.

On 15 June 2022, Connelly signed a one-year extension to his existing contract to remain with the Doonhamers.

On 30 July 2022, Connelly scored Queens first goal of the 2022-23 season, after only 20 seconds and was also sent off for violent conduct in the 85th minute, as the Doonhamers were defeated 4-1 versus Clyde at Palmerston.

On 30 August 2022, Connelly scored Queens equaliser in the 17th minute at Ibrox, as the Doonhamers lost 3-1 to Rangers in the second round of the Premier Sports Cup

On 14 June 2023, Connelly signed a one-year extension to his existing contract to remain at Palmerston.

On 9 July 2024, Connelly signed a one-year deal with Clyde.

== International career ==
Connelly has represented Scotland at youth international level.
