= Josh Todd (footballer) =

English footballer (born 1994)

Personal information
- Date of birth: 11 June 1994 (age 32)
- Place of birth: Carlisle, England
- Position: Midfielder

Team information
- Current team: Dumbarton
- Number: 8

Youth career
- 2006-2010: Carlisle United

Senior career*
Years	Team	Apps	(Gls)
2010–2014	Carlisle United	1	(0)
2012	→ Workington (loan)	1	(0)
2013–2014	→ Annan Athletic (loan)	17	(9)
2014–2016	Annan Athletic	81	(23)
2016–2017	Dumbarton	20	(0)
2017–2018	St Mirren	14	(1)
2018	→ Queen of the South (loan)	8	(0)
2018–2019	Queen of the South	30	(5)
2019–2020	Dundee	13	(0)
2020–2021	Falkirk	12	(0)
2021	→ Ayr United (loan)	4	(1)
2021–2024	Queen of the South	84	(8)
2024–2026	Annan Athletic	51	(2)
2026–	Dumbarton	21	(1)
- * Club domestic league appearances and goals as of 20:37, 7 November 2026 (UTC)

Josh Todd (born 11 June 1994) is an English footballer who plays as a midfielder for Scottish League Two club Dumbarton.

== Club career ==
=== Carlisle United ===
Todd started his career in the youth team of Carlisle United and became a first-year scholar in 2010. Todd featured occasionally as an unused substitute for the first-team in seasons 2010–11, 2011–12 and 2012–13.

==== Workington loan ====
On 21 August 2012, Todd joined Conference North club Workington for a month to gain first-team experience, however he only made a single appearance during his time there, featuring as an unused substitute twice. Todd had his first-team debut for the Cumbrians in a 3–0 win at home to Hartlepool United on 26 December 2012, as a 22nd-minute substitute for Paul Thirlwell.

==== Annan Athletic loan ====
On 29 August 2013, Todd signed for Scottish League Two club Annan Athletic on loan. On 10 January 2014, Todd's loan at the Black and Golds was extended until the end of the season.

=== Annan Athletic ===
On 30 January 2014, Todd signed for Annan Athletic on a permanent deal after a successful loan period with the Dumfriesshire club.

=== Dumbarton ===
Todd then signed for Scottish Championship club Dumbarton as an amateur in July 2016, after spending time on trial with the Sons, Dunfermline Athletic and Ayr United. After only twenty league appearances for the Sons, Todd was released by the club on 13 January 2017.

=== St Mirren ===
On 16 January 2017, Todd signed a short-term contract with St Mirren. Despite being used mainly as a substitute until the end of the season, Todd signed a one-year contract extension with the club in May 2017. Todd was released by St Mirren at the end of the 2017–18 season.

==== Queen of the South loan ====
On 20 March 2018, Todd signed with Queen of the South on an emergency loan deal until the end of that current season. Todd debuted on 20 March 2018 in the 3–2 win at Dundee United.

=== Queen of the South (First spell) ===
On 8 May 2018, Todd signed a one-year contract with Queen of the South, after spending time on loan with the Dumfries club towards the end of the 2017–18 season.

=== Dundee ===
On 26 February 2019, Todd signed a two-year contract with Dundee on a pre-contract. Todd spent the first half of the 2019–20 season at Dens Park.

=== Falkirk ===
On 17 January 2020, after struggling to get first-team action at Dens Park, Todd signed for Scottish League One club Falkirk on an 18-month contract.

==== Ayr United loan ====
In March 2021, Todd was sent out on loan to Ayr United.

=== Queen of the South (Second spell) ===
On 9 June 2021, Todd signed once again for the Doonhamers.

On 8 January 2022, Todd was the captain versus Kilmarnock, as club captain Willie Gibson served a suspension.

On 25 February 2022, Todd signed a one-year extension to his contract to remain at the Doonhamers until the summer of 2023. Todd was also appointed the Dumfries club's new club captain, after Gibson was appointed player-manager.

On 12 June 2023, Todd signed a one-year extension to his contract to remain at the Doonhamers until the summer of 2024.

During September 2023, Todd decided to concentrate more on his own playing performances, as Harry Cochrane was appointed Queens new club captain.

=== Annan Athletic (Second spell) ===
On 27 May 2024, following the expiry of his contract with Queen of the South, Todd returned to his former club and Galloway rival Annan Athletic under former teammate and manager Willie Gibson. Todd made his return debut for the Galabankies in a win over Inverness Caledonian Thistle in the Scottish League Cup group stage. Todd netted his first goal of this spell in a League Cup win over Arbroath. He later scored in Annan's league-opening win over Cove Rangers on 3 August. Todd left Annan due to work commitments in January 2026.

=== Dumbarton (second spell) ===
Todd returned to Dumbarton for a second spell in January 2026, signing an 18-month deal with the Sons - having previously played for the club in the 2016–17 season. He scored and was named Man of the Match on his debut in a 2–2 draw with Elgin City. Todd was named as the club's vice-captain in the summer of 2026.

== Career statistics ==
As of 20:37, 7 November 2026 (UTC)

Appearances and goals by club, season and competition
Club	Season	League			National cup (Note: Includes FA Cup and Scottish Cup)		League cup (Note: Includes Football League Cup and Scottish League Cup)		Other		Total	
Club	Season	Division	Apps	Goals	Apps	Goals	Apps	Goals	Apps	Goals	Apps	Goals
Carlisle United	2010–11	League One	0	0	0	0	0	0	0	0	0	0
Carlisle United	2011–12	League One	0	0	0	0	0	0	0	0	0	0
Carlisle United	2012–13	League One	1	0	0	0	0	0	0	0	1	0
Carlisle United	2013–14	League One	0	0	0	0	0	0	0	0	0	0
Carlisle United	Total		1	0	0	0	0	0	0	0	1	0
Workington (loan)	2012–13	Conference North	1	0	0	0	—		0	0	1	0
Annan Athletic (loan)	2013–14	Scottish League Two	15	8	4	1	0	0	0	0	19	9
Annan Athletic	2013–14	Scottish League Two	12	4	—		—		2 (Note: Appearance(s) in Scottish League One play-offs)	0	14	4
Annan Athletic	2014–15	Scottish League Two	36	6	4	0	1	0	1 (Note: Appearance(s) in Scottish Challenge Cup)	0	42	6
Annan Athletic	2015–16	Scottish League Two	33	13	3	2	0	0	2	3	38	18
Annan Athletic	Total		81	23	7	2	1	0	5	3	94	28
Dumbarton	2016–17	Scottish Championship	20	0	2	0	4	0	1	0	27	0
St Mirren	2016–17	Scottish Championship	11	1	0	0	—		0	0	11	1
St Mirren	2017–18	Scottish Championship	3	0	0	0	0	0	0	0	3	0
St Mirren	Total		14	1	0	0	0	0	0	0	14	1
Queen of the South (loan)	2017–18	Scottish Championship	8	0	—		—		—		8	0
Queen of the South	2018–19	Scottish Championship	30	6	2	0	4	1	6 (Note: Two appearances in Scottish Challenge Cup; Four appearances in Scottish Championship play-offs)	0	42	7
Dundee	2019–20	Scottish Championship	13	0	0	0	4	0	1	0	18	0
Falkirk	2019–20	Scottish League One	4	0	2	0	—		—		6	0
Falkirk	2020–21	Scottish League One	8	0	0	0	4	0	0	0	12	0
Falkirk	Total		12	0	2	0	4	0	0	0	18	0
Ayr United (loan)	2020–21	Scottish Championship	4	1	1	0	—		—		5	1
Queen of the South	2021–22	Scottish Championship	25	2	2	0	3	0	4	0	34	2
Queen of the South	2022–23	Scottish League One	31	4	1	0	5	1	4	1	41	6
Queen of the South	2023–24	Scottish League One	28	2	2	0	4	0	2	0	36	2
Queen of the South	Total		84	8	5	0	12	1	10	1	111	10
Annan Athletic	2024–25	Scottish League One	33	2	1	0	4	1	6 (Note: Two appearances in Scottish Challenge Cup, Four appearances in Scottish League One play-offs)	0	44	3
Annan Athletic	2025–26	Scottish League Two	18	0	2	0	4	0	6	0	30	0
Annan Athletic	Total		52	2	3	0	8	1	12	0	74	3
Dumbarton	2025–26	Scottish League Two	13	1	0	0	0	0	0	0	13	1
Dumbarton	2026–27	Scottish League Two	8	0	0	0	4	0	5	0	17	0
Career total			355	44	25	3	41	3	39	4	451	54
