= Allan Johnston =

Scottish footballer & manager (born 1973)

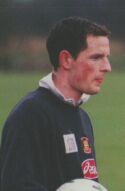
- Johnston (Sunderland) in 1998

Personal information
- Full name: Allan Johnston
- Date of birth: 14 December 1973 (age 52)
- Place of birth: Glasgow, Scotland
- Position: Midfielder

Senior career*
Years	Team	Apps	(Gls)
1990–1996	Heart of Midlothian	84	(12)
1996–1997	Rennes	23	(2)
1997–2000	Sunderland	87	(19)
1999	→ Birmingham City (loan)	8	(0)
2000	→ Bolton Wanderers (loan)	19	(3)
2000–2001	Rangers	14	(3)
2001–2004	Middlesbrough	17	(1)
2002–2003	→ Sheffield Wednesday (loan)	12	(2)
2004–2009	Kilmarnock	115	(5)
2009–2010	St Mirren	10	(0)
2010–2013	Queen of the South	61	(7)
Total		450	(51)

International career
1994–1996	Scotland U21	3	(0)
1998	Scotland B	2	(0)
1998–2002	Scotland	18	(2)

Managerial career
- 2012–2013: Queen of the South
- 2013–2015: Kilmarnock
- 2015–2019: Dunfermline Athletic
- 2019–2022: Queen of the South
- * Club domestic league appearances and goals

Allan Johnston (born 14 December 1973) is a Scottish football player and coach, who was most recently the manager of Queen of the South. He was the brother of footballer Sammy Johnston.

Nicknamed "Magic", Allan Johnston started his professional playing career with Heart of Midlothian and then followed on to French club Rennes before a spell in English football with Sunderland before returning to Scotland with Rangers. Johnston then returned to England with Middlesbrough and Sheffield Wednesday. Johnston returned to Scotland and played out his playing career with Kilmarnock, St Mirren and Queen of the South. Johnston played for Scotland 18 times in full internationals, and also played for the Scotland under-21 and B international teams.

Johnston started his managerial career in 2012, as player-manager of Queen of the South. Johnston won the Second Division championship in his first season as a manager, then moved to Kilmarnock. Johnston departed Rugby Park after 18 months after a dispute with the club's board about the sale of a player. Johnston was appointed manager of Dunfermline Athletic in 2015, where he won the League One Championship in his first season.

== Playing career ==
=== Club ===
==== Heart of Midlothian ====
Johnston began his career with Heart of Midlothian, becoming a first-team regular in the mid-1990s. In January 1996, Johnston scored his first career hat-trick, scoring all three goals in a 3–0 win against Rangers at Ibrox. Johnston picked up a Scottish Cup runners-up medal that season in the defeat to Rangers where Brian Laudrup dominated the final.

==== Rennes ====
During the summer of 1996, Johnston moved to French club Rennes (Aberdeen defender Gary Smith making the same move), but he left after less than one season.

==== Sunderland ====
Johnston finished the season with FA Premier League side Sunderland as they were relegated to the Football League First Division. Although Sunderland were defeated in the 1998 play-off final, the club won the title the following season. During the summer of 1999, with just one year left on his contract, Johnston began negotiations about an extension. During this time, interest in Johnston was expressed by Rangers and after negotiations broke down with Sunderland, Johnston stated his desire to move to Glasgow. Despite previously being a first-team regular he never appeared for Sunderland in 1999–2000 season and was subsequently loaned to Birmingham City and Bolton Wanderers, the latter with whom he appeared in the FA Cup semi-final. However in the semi-final versus Aston Villa he was one of two Bolton players to have their penalty saved by David James as they crashed out in a shoot-out.

Johnston was the scorer of the final competitive goal at Roker Park in a 3–0 win over Everton in the final home game of the 1996/97 season.

==== Rangers ====
At the end of the 1999–00 season, having not featured for Sunderland in the entire campaign, Johnston moved to Rangers on a free transfer, scoring on his debut in a Champions League qualifying match against FBK Kaunas. He scored twice more for Rangers, his strikes coming against Herfolge in another Champions League qualifier and Brechin in the Scottish Cup.

==== Middlesbrough ====
Little over twelve months later, in late August 2001 and with the FA Premier League season already underway, Johnston moved to Middlesbrough in a £600,000 deal, making his debut in the derby defeat to Newcastle United the following weekend. Johnston scored in his second match against West Ham but failed to score again all season, missing February and March due to injury. The following season, Johnston spent much of the season on loan with Sheffield Wednesday, scoring twice, having only played in two League Cup matches for Boro, subsequently missing the entire 2003–04 season.

==== Kilmarnock ====
Johnston signed for Kilmarnock in August 2004, reuniting him with former Hearts management team Jim Jefferies and Billy Brown. In April 2007, with his contract about to expire, Johnston agreed a new two-year deal, which wasn't extended upon its expiry in June 2009, resulting in his release from Rugby Park.

==== St Mirren ====
On 8 August 2009, Johnston played in a trial match for St Mirren against Wigan Athletic. After the match, manager Gus MacPherson said that he would love to sign him, but felt he might be out of their price range. After making 10 appearances for St Mirren, he was released at the end of the season.

==== Queen of the South ====
In July 2010 Johnston played as a trialist in four games for Dumfries club Queen of the South. Johnston was then confirmed on the club's website as having signed a one-year contract on 16 July 2010. Johnston's competitive league debut for Queens was on 22 August 2010 when he played in central midfield during a 3–1 away win at Cowdenbeath. Johnston scored his first Queens goal in a league win at Palmerston Park versus Partick Thistle on 18 September 2010.

=== International ===
Johnston made 18 appearances for Scotland between 1998 and 2002, and was also capped at under–21 level.

== Coaching career ==
=== Queen of the South (first spell) ===
Queen of the South announced on 21 June 2011 that Johnston had signed a contract as player coach. On 3 May 2012, Johnston was appointed as Queens new player-manager. Johnston led Queens to a historic double in his first full season in management, winning the Scottish Second Division Championship and the Scottish Challenge Cup.

=== Kilmarnock ===
Johnston and his assistant, Sandy Clark both signed two-year contracts to join Kilmarnock as the club's new management team on 24 June 2013. Queen of the South receive around £30,000 in compensation. Kilmarnock narrowly avoided relegation in Johnston's first season in charge, winning their last two games to finish above the relegation play-off position. The club performed better in the league during his second season, but in February 2015 Johnston announced his intention to leave the club at the end of the season. He had been upset by the sale of Robbie Muirhead, which Johnston said had only been advised to him after the transfer window had closed. The Kilmarnock board then decided to remove Johnston from his position immediately.

=== Dunfermline Athletic ===
On 8 May 2015, after three months out of work, Johnston was appointed manager of Scottish League One side Dunfermline Athletic on a one-year contract. His first season with the club saw him twice named Scottish League One Manager of the Month, guide the Pars to the league title and promotion to the Scottish Championship, and additionally, saw the side compete well against Scottish Premiership opposition in both the Scottish Cup and Scottish League Cup. In April 2016, Johnston was rewarded for his achievements with a new two-year contract, keeping him at East End Park until Summer 2018.

Johnston's first season in the championship saw the club finish in fifth place, four points off the play-off positions. The following season, Dunfermline finished one place better off which saw them contest the quarter-final play-off against Dundee United. After a goalless first leg, the Pars lost the return leg 2–1 at Tannadice.

On 22 May 2018, Johnston signed a new two-year contract. In January 2019 Dunfermline were not in contention for a play-off spot. On 9 January the club announced Johnston had been relieved of his duties 4 days after Alloa Athletic scored a 94th minute equaliser against Dunfermline after Dunfermline having been 2-0 ahead.

=== Queen of the South (second spell) ===
On 5 May 2019, soon after Queens ended their league campaign in the 2018–19 Scottish Championship relegation play-off position, the Doonhamers appointed Johnston and his assistant, Sandy Clark on a two-year contract for their second spell at the Dumfries club ahead of the play-off matches versus Montrose.

On 16 April 2021, Johnston and Clark signed a contract extension to remain as the Queen of the South management team until May 2023. On 13 February 2022, Johnston and Clark departed the Doonhamers by mutual consent (4 wins in 24 matches) as the Dumfries club languished in the automatic relegation place in the Scottish Championship.

== Personal life ==
His son, Max is also a footballer (a Motherwell youth product, he made his senior debut in 2021); elder brother Sammy Johnston also played professionally for St Johnstone and Partick Thistle among others.

== Career statistics ==
=== International appearances ===
Appearances and goals by national team and year
National team	Year	Apps	Goals
Scotland	1998	2	0
Scotland	1999	5	2
Scotland	2000	4	0
Scotland	2001	1	0
Scotland	2002	6	0
Total		18	2

Scores and results list Scotland's goal tally first, score column indicates score after each Johnston goal.

List of international goals scored by Allan Johnston
No.	Date	Venue	Opponent	Score	Result	Competition
1	5 June 1999	Svangaskard, Toftir, Faroe Islands	Faroe Islands	1–0	1–1	UEFA Euro 2000 qualifying
2	9 June 1999	Generali Arena, Prague, Czech Republic	Czech Republic	2–0	2–3	UEFA Euro 2000 qualifying

=== Managerial record ===
As of 13 February 2022

Managerial record by team and tenure
Team	From	To	Record					Ref.
Team	From	To	G	W	D	L	Win %	Ref.
Queen of the South	3 May 2012	25 June 2013	47	35	7	5	74.47	
Kilmarnock	25 June 2013	6 February 2015	66	20	10	36	30.30	
Dunfermline Athletic	8 May 2015	9 January 2019	168	79	44	45	47.02	
Queen of the South	7 May 2019	12 February 2022	104	30	26	48	28.85	
Total			385	164	87	134	42.60	—

== Honours ==
=== Player ===
Sunderland

- Football League First Division: 1998–99

Queen of the South

- Scottish Second Division: 2012–13
- Scottish Challenge Cup: 2012–13

Individual

- PFA Team of the Year: 1998–99 First Division

=== Manager ===
Queen of the South

- Scottish Second Division: 2012–13
- Scottish Challenge Cup: 2012–13
- Scottish Championship play-offs: 2018–19

Dunfermline Athletic

- Scottish League One: 2015–16

Individual

- PFA Scotland Manager of the Year: 2012–13
- Scottish Second Division Manager of the Year 2012–13
- SPFL Championship Manager of the Month: August 2017
- SPFL League One Manager of the Month: December 2015, March 2016
