= 2024–25 Hibernian F.C. season =

Hibernian
2024–25 season
- Chairman: Malcolm McPherson
- Manager: David Gray
- Stadium: Easter Road
- Premiership: 3rd
- Scottish Cup: Quarter-finals
- League Cup: Second round
- Top goalscorer: League: Martin Boyle (15); All: Martin Boyle (20)
- Highest home attendance: 20,011 vs. Heart of Midlothian, Premiership, 27 October 2024
- Lowest home attendance: 4,670 vs. Peterhead, League Cup, 27 July 2024
- Average home league attendance: 17,082
Home colours	Away colours	Third colours

The 2024–25 season was the 148th season of football played by Hibernian, a professional football club based in Edinburgh, Scotland. The club also competed in the top tier of Scottish football, the Scottish Premiership, for the eighth consecutive season. Hibs also competed in the League Cup and the Scottish Cup.

== Results and fixtures ==
=== Pre-season friendlies ===
Hibernian's score is shown first in each case.

Hibernian pre-season results
Date	Venue	Opponents	Score	Hibernian scorers	Att.	Ref.
29 June 2024	Meadowbank Stadium, Edinburgh (A)	Edinburgh City	5–0	Cadden 15', Levitt 23', McKirdy 30', McAllister 48', Campbell 63'		Report
3 July 2024		MSV Duisburg	1–0	Campbell		Report
6 July 2024	Sportpark Kerkebos (A)	PAOK	1–0	Boyle 5'		Report
24 July 2024	Easter Road, Edinburgh (H)	Watford	2–3	Campbell 16', McKirdy 53'	8,659	Report

=== Scottish Premiership ===
Hibernian's score is shown first in each case.

Hibernian in the 2024–25 Scottish Premiership
Date	Venue	Opponents	Score	Hibernian scorers	Att.	Ref.
4 August 2024	St Mirren Park, Paisley (A)	St Mirren	0–3		6,171	Report
11 August 2024	Easter Road, Edinburgh (H)	Celtic	0–2		17,918	Report
24 August 2024	Easter Road, Edinburgh (H)	Dundee	2–2	Boyle 45', Bowie 72'	15,710	Report
1 September 2024	Rugby Park, Kilmarnock (A)	Kilmarnock	1–1	Newell 50'	7,763	Report
14 September 2024	Easter Road, Edinburgh (H)	St Johnstone	2–0	Kukharevych 45+1', Boyle 72'	15,448	Report
29 September 2024	Ibrox Stadium, Glasgow (A)	Rangers	0–1		48,217	Report
5 October 2024	Easter Road, Edinburgh (H)	Motherwell	1–2	Hoilett 59'	15,892	Report
19 October 2024	Tannadice Park, Dundee (A)	Dundee United	2–3	O'Hora 43', Gayle 72'	10,870	Report
27 October 2024	Easter Road, Edinburgh (H)	Heart of Midlothian	1–1	Kukharevych 65'	20,011	Report
30 October 2024	Victoria Park, Dingwall (A)	Ross County	0–0		3,468	Report
3 November 2024	Easter Road, Edinburgh (H)	Dundee United	1–1	Miller 28'	15,454	Report
9 November 2024	Easter Road, Edinburgh (H)	St Mirren	1–2	N.Cadden 90+4 pen.'	15,594	Report
23 November 2024	Dens Park, Dundee (A)	Dundee	1–4	N.Cadden 2'	5,310	Report
26 November 2024	Easter Road, Edinburgh (H)	Aberdeen	3–3	Newell 40', N.Cadden 90+2', Bushiri 90+6'	15,845	Report
30 November 2024	Fir Park, Motherwell (A)	Motherwell	3–0	Hoilett 26', Kukharevych 38', Campbell 81'	5,212	Report
7 December 2024	Celtic Park, Glasgow (A)	Celtic	0–3		58,641	Report
14 December 2024	Easter Road, Edinburgh (H)	Ross County	3–1	Gayle 45+6', Youan 73' (pen.), Campbell 90+4'	14,885	Report
21 December 2024	Pittodrie Stadium, Aberdeen (A)	Aberdeen	3–1	Youan 18', N.Cadden 35', Boyle 49'	18,375	Report
26 December 2024	Tynecastle Park, Edinburgh (A)	Heart of Midlothian	2–1	Rowles 9' (o.g.), Gayle 78'	18,726	Report
29 December 2024	Easter Road, Edinburgh (H)	Kilmarnock	1–0	Triantis 25’	19,265	Report
2 January 2025	McDiarmid Park, Perth (A)	St Johnstone	1–1	Gayle 79'	6,287	Report
5 January 2025	Easter Road, Edinburgh (H)	Rangers	3–3	Boyle 32, 61' (pen.), Bushiri 83'	17,539	Report
11 January 2025	Easter Road, Edinburgh (H)	Motherwell	3–1	Boyle 27', 81' (pen.), Triantis 30'	15,829	Report
25 January 2025	Victoria Park, Dingwall (A)	Ross County	1–1	Levitt 42'	4,003	Report
1 February 2025	Easter Road, Edinburgh (H)	Aberdeen	2–0	Triantis 24', N.Cadden 48'	16,533	Report
16 February 2025	St Mirren Park, Paisley (A)	St Mirren	0–0		7,468	Report
22 February 2025	Easter Road, Edinburgh (H)	Celtic	2–1	Campbell 2', 45+4’	18,357	Report
26 February 2025	Tannadice Park, Dundee (A)	Dundee United	3–1	Kukharevych 18’, Bowie 90’, Hoilett 90+10’	10,674	Report
2 March 2025	Easter Road, Edinburgh (H)	Heart of Midlothian	2–1	Boyle 6', Iredale 74’	19,873	Report
15 March 2025	Rugby Park, Kilmarnock (A)	Kilmarnock	1–1	Boyle 25'	6,703	Report
29 March 2025	Easter Road, Edinburgh (H)	St Johnstone	3–0	Hoilett 18’, Boyle 29’, Bowie 90+5’	17,002	Report
5 April 2025	Ibrox Stadium, Glasgow (A)	Rangers	2–0	Levitt 8', Boyle 69'	50,922	Report
13 April 2025	Easter Road, Edinburgh (H)	Dundee	4–0	Bushiri 26', Bowie 68', 84', Gayle 78'	17,926	Report
26 April 2025	Pittodrie Stadium, Aberdeen (A)	Aberdeen	0–1		17,396	Report
3 May 2025	Easter Road, Edinburgh (H)	Dundee United	3–1	Boyle 3', Kuharevich 14', Gayle 87'	18,399	Report
10 May 2025	Celtic Park, Glasgow (A)	Celtic	1–3	Boyle 25'	58,972	Report
14 May 2025	St Mirren Park, Paisley (A)	St Mirren	2–2	Boyle 3', Kuharevich 10'	7,671	Report
17 May 2025	Easter Road, Edinburgh (H)	Rangers	2–2	Bowie 16', Boyle 66'	18,793	Report

=== Scottish Cup ===
Hibernian's score is shown first in each case.

Hibernian in the 2024–25 Scottish Cup
Date	Round	Venue	Opponents	Score	Hibernian scorers	Att.	Ref.
18 January 2025	Fourth round	Easter Road, Edinburgh (H)	Clydebank	3–0	Boyle 2', 59', Molotnikov 46'	11,406	Report
7 February 2025	Fifth round	Somerset Park, Ayr (A)	Ayr United	1–0	Bushiri 87'	7,364	Report
9 March 2025	Quarter-finals	Celtic Park, Glasgow (A)	Celtic	0–2		58,911	Report

=== Scottish League Cup ===
Having finished outside the European qualification places, Hibs will enter the League Cup at the group stage. They were drawn in Group C along with Queen's Park, Kelty Hearts, Peterhead, and Elgin City.

Hibernian's score is shown first in each case.

Hibernian in the 2024–25 League Cup
Date	Round	Venue	Opponents	Score	Hibernian scorers	Att.	Ref.
13 July 2024	Group stage	Borough Briggs, Elgin (A)	Elgin City	5–0	Vente 8', 44', 58', Ekpiteta 51', Boyle 54'	1,788	Report
16 July 2024	Group stage	Easter Road, Edinburgh (H)	Queen's Park	5–1	O'Hora 15', Boyle 19', 77', Molotnikov 45+2', Levitt 72'	4,795	Report
20 July 2024	Group stage	New Central Park, Kelty (A)	Kelty Hearts	0–1		1,813	Report
27 July 2024	Group stage	Easter Road, Edinburgh (H)	Peterhead	4–0	Miller 5', 50', Molotnikov 59', Moriah-Welsh 71'	4,670	Report
18 August 2024	Second round	Celtic Park, Glasgow (A)	Celtic	1–3	Kukharevych 34'	47,370	Report

== Player statistics ==
As of 17 May 2025

No.	Pos	Player	Premiership		League Cup		Scottish Cup		Total	
No.	Pos	Player	Apps	Goals	Apps	Goals	Apps	Goals	Apps	Goals
Goalkeepers
1	GK	(England) Josef Bursik	13	0	4	0	0	0	17	0
13	GK	(England) Jordan Smith	25	0	1	0	3	0	29	0
25	GK	(Poland) Max Boruc	0	0	0	0	0	0	0	0
Defenders
2	DF	(Australia) Lewis Miller	22+10	1	5	2	2	0	39	3
4	DF	(England) Marvin Ekpiteta	12+1	0	4	1	0	0	17	1
5	DF	(Republic of Ireland) Warren O'Hora	30+2	1	5	1	2	0	39	2
12	DF	(Scotland) Chris Cadden	27+5	0	1+1	0	2+1	0	37	0
15	DF	(Australia) Jack Iredale	25+3	1	0	0	3	0	31	1
19	DF	(Scotland) Nicky Cadden	20+9	5	0+1	0	2	0	32	5
21	DF	(England) Jordan Obita	22+13	0	4+1	0	0+2	0	42	0
27	DF	(England) Kanayo Megwa	0	0	1+2	0	0	0	3	0
33	DF	(Democratic Republic of the Congo) Rocky Bushiri	26+2	3	2+2	0	3	1	35	4
42	DF	(Scotland) Rory Whittaker	0	0	0	0	0	0	0	0
Midfielders
6	MF	(Wales) Dylan Levitt	12+7	2	1+3	1	2+1	0	26	3
8	MF	(Republic of Ireland) Jake Doyle-Hayes	0+1	0	0	0	0	0	1	0
8	MF	(The Gambia) Alasana Manneh	1+3	0	0	0	0	0	4	0
11	MF	(England) Joe Newell	16	2	4	0	0	0	20	2
14	MF	(England) Luke Amos	0+1	0	1+4	0	0+1	0	7	0
18	MF	(South Korea) Kwon Hyeok-kyu	12+9	0	0	0	1	0	22	0
22	MF	(Guyana) Nathan Moriah-Welsh	4+13	0	3+2	1	1+1	0	24	1
24	MF	(Liberia) Nohan Kenneh	0	0	0	0	0	0	0	0
26	MF	(Australia) Nectarios Triantis	34	3	0	0	2	0	36	3
28	MF	(Belgium) Allan Delferrière	0	0	0	0	0	0	0	0
32	MF	(Scotland) Josh Campbell	19+14	4	4+1	0	2+1	0	41	4
35	MF	(Scotland) Rudi Molotnikov	6+5	0	4+1	2	1	1	17	3
40	MF	(Scotland) Reuben McAllister	0	0	0	0	0	0	0	0
44	MF	(Scotland) Jacob MacIntyre	0	0	0	0	0	0	0	0
49	MF	(Scotland) Lewis Gillie	0	0	0	0	0+1	0	1	0
Forwards
7	FW	(France) Élie Youan	11+2	2	0+1	0	0+1	0	15	2
9	FW	(Suriname) Dylan Vente	1+1	0	4	3	0	0	6	3
10	FW	(Australia) Martin Boyle	29+7	15	5	3	3	2	44	20
17	FW	(England) Harry McKirdy	0+6	0	1	0	0	0	7	0
20	FW	(Scotland) Kieron Bowie	5+13	6	0+1	0	1+2	0	22	6
23	FW	(Canada) Junior Hoilett	19+9	4	0	0	1+1	0	30	4
29	FW	(Portugal) Jair Tavares	0	0	0+3	0	0	0	3	0
34	FW	(England) Dwight Gayle	7+21	6	0	0	0+1	0	29	6
53	FW	(Scotland) Josh Landers	0	0	0	0	0	0	0	0
99	FW	(Ukraine) Mykola Kukharevych	20+5	6	1	1	2	0	28	7

== Club statistics ==
=== League table ===
Pos	Team	Pld	W	D	L	GF	GA	GD	Pts	Qualification or relegation (Note: Teams play each other three times (33 matches), before the league is split into two groups (the top six and the bottom six).)
1	Celtic (C)	38	29	5	4	112	26	+86	92	Qualification for the Champions League play-off round
2	Rangers	38	22	9	7	80	41	+39	75	Qualification for the Champions League second qualifying round
3	Hibernian	38	15	13	10	62	50	+12	58	Qualification for the Europa League second qualifying round
4	Dundee United	38	15	8	15	45	54	−9	53	Qualification for the Conference League second qualifying round
5	Aberdeen	38	15	8	15	48	61	−13	53	Qualification for the Europa League play-off round (Note: Aberdeen qualified for the Europa League play-off round as the 2024–25 Scottish Cup winners.)

Rules for classification: 1) Points; 2) Goal difference; 3) Goals scored; 4) Head-to-head points; 5) Head-to-head goal difference; 6) Play-off (only if deciding champion, UEFA competitions qualification, second stage group allocation or relegation).
(C) Champions

=== League Cup table ===
Pos	Team	Pld	W	PW	PL	L	GF	GA	GD	Pts	Qualification	HIB	QPA	PET	KEL	ELG
1	Hibernian	4	3	0	0	1	14	2	+12	9	Qualification for the second round	—	5–1	4–0	—	—
2	Queen's Park	4	3	0	0	1	16	5	+11	9	Qualification for the second round	—	—	—	6–0	4–0
3	Peterhead	4	2	0	0	2	5	11	−6	6		—	0–5	—	—	4–2
4	Kelty Hearts	4	1	0	1	2	2	8	−6	4		1–0	—	0–1	—	—
5	Elgin City	4	0	1	0	3	3	14	−11	2		0–5	—	—	p1–1	—

Rules for classification: 1) goal difference, 2) goals scored, 3) away goals scored, 4) matches won, 5) away matches won, 6) drawing of lots.

=== Management statistics ===
As of 17 May 2025

Name	From	To	P	W	D	L	Win% (Note: Win% is the percentage of matches won rounded to two decimal places.)
(Scotland) David Gray	6 June 2024	Present Day	45	20	12	13	44.44

== Transfers ==
=== Players in ===
Player	From	Fee
(Republic of Ireland) Warren O'Hora	(England) MK Dons	Free
(England) Marvin Ekpiteta	(England) Blackpool	Free
(England) Jordan Smith	(England) Stockport County	Free
(Canada) Junior Hoilett	(Scotland) Aberdeen	Free
(Scotland) Nicky Cadden	(England) Barnsley	Free
(Scotland) Kieron Bowie	(England) Fulham	£600,000
(Australia) Jack Iredale	(England) Bolton Wanderers	Undisclosed
(England) Dwight Gayle	(England) Derby County	Free
(The Gambia) Alasana Manneh	(Denmark) OB	Undisclosed

=== Players out ===
Player	To	Fee
(England) Adam Le Fondre	(England) F.C. United of Manchester	Free
(Scotland) Paul Hanlon	(Scotland) Raith Rovers	Free
(Scotland) Lewis Stevenson	(Scotland) Raith Rovers	Free
(Scotland) Jacob Blaney	(Northern Ireland) Crusaders	Undisclosed
(Scotland) David Marshall	Retired	
(Scotland) Dylan Tait	(Scotland) Falkirk	Undisclosed
(Ghana) Jojo Wollacott	(England) Crawley Town	Undisclosed
(Scotland) Ewan Henderson	(Belgium) Beerschot	Undisclosed
(England) Riley Harbottle	(England) AFC Wimbledon	Undisclosed
(Republic of Ireland) Jake Doyle-Hayes	(Republic of Ireland) Sligo Rovers	Free
(Scotland) Josh O'Connor	(Northern Ireland) Crusaders	Undisclosed
(Scotland) Josh Landers	(England) West Ham United	Undisclosed
(England) Luke Amos	(Australia) Perth Glory	Free
(England) Harry McKirdy	(England) Bromley	Free

=== Loans in ===
Player	From
(England) Josef Bursik	(Belgium) Club Brugge
(Ukraine) Mykola Kukharevych	(Wales) Swansea City
(South Korea) Kwon Hyeok-kyu	(Scotland) Celtic
(Australia) Nectarios Triantis	(England) Sunderland

=== Loans out ===
Player	To
(Scotland) Murray Johnson	(Scotland) Airdrieonians
(Northern Ireland) Kyle McClelland	(Northern Ireland) Coleraine
(Scotland) Murray Aiken	(Scotland) Airdrieonians
(Scotland) Oscar MacIntyre	Queen of the South
(Libya) Malik Zaid	(Scotland) Annan Athletic
(Scotland) Josh O'Connor	(Republic of Ireland) Dundalk
(Scotland) Freddie Owens	(Scotland) Civil Service Strollers
(Scotland) Rory Whittaker	(Scotland) The Spartans
(Suriname) Dylan Vente	(Netherlands) PEC Zwolle
(Portugal) Jair Tavares	(Scotland) Motherwell
(Belgium) Allan Delferrière	(Luxembourg) Racing-Union
(England) Kanayo Megwa	(Scotland) Partick Thistle
(Scotland) Reuben McAllister	(Scotland) Cove Rangers
(Scotland) Jacob MacIntyre	(Scotland) Kelty Hearts
(Liberia) Nohan Kenneh	(Scotland) Ross County
(Scotland) Murray Johnson	(Scotland) Queen of the South

== See also ==
- List of Hibernian F.C. seasons
