= 2025–26 Hibernian F.C. season =

Hibernian
2025–26 season
- Chairman: Ian Gordon
- Manager: David Gray
- Stadium: Easter Road
- Premiership: Fifth place
- Scottish Cup: Fourth round
- League Cup: Quarter–final
- Europa League: Second qualifying round
- Conference League: Play-off round
- Top goalscorer: League: Martin Boyle; Kieron Bowie; Jamie McGrath (8); All: Martin Boyle (11)
- Highest home attendance: 20,035 v Heart of Midlothian, 27 December
- Lowest home attendance: 17,525 v Kilmarnock, 10 August
- Average home league attendance: 18,559
Home colours	Away colours	Third colours

The 2025–26 season was the 149th season of football played by Hibernian, a professional football club based in Edinburgh, Scotland. The club competed in the top tier of Scottish football, the Scottish Premiership, for the ninth consecutive season. They lost in the second qualifying round of the Europa League to Midtjylland and the play-off round of the Conference League to Legia Warsaw, in the quarter-finals of the League Cup to Rangers, and Dunfermline in the Scottish Cup.

== Results and fixtures ==
=== Pre-season friendlies ===
Hibernian's score is shown first in each case.

Hibernian pre-season results
Date	Venue	Opponents	Score	Hibernian scorers	Att.	Ref.
2 July 2025		Duisburg	0–0		Nil	Report
5 July 2025	Sportpark De Toekomst, Duivendrecht (A)	Ajax	3–6	Boyle 16', Hoilett 70', Bowie 84'	Nil	
9 July 2025	Easter Road, Edinburgh (H)	Rot-Weiss Essen	3–2	McGrath 2', Hoilett 14', Boyle 75'	12,622	Report
15 July 2025	Canford Magna Training Ground (A)	Bournemouth	1–2	Bowie	Nil	Report
19 July 2025	Easter Road, Edinburgh (H)	Bolton Wanderers	0–2			Report

=== Scottish Premiership ===
Hibernian's score is shown first in each case.

Hibernian in the 2025–26 Scottish Premiership
Date	Venue	Opponents	Score	Hibernian scorers	Att.	Ref.
3 August 2025	Dens Park, Dundee (A)	Dundee	2–1	Bowie 28', 31'	7,825	Report
10 August 2025	Easter Road, Edinburgh (H)	Kilmarnock	2–2	Bushiri 20', Youan 27'	17,525	Report
31 August 2025	Easter Road, Edinburgh (H)	St Mirren	1–1	Bushiri 70'	17,658	Report
13 September 2025	Easter Road, Edinburgh (H)	Dundee United	3–3	Kucherenko 27' (o.g.), Bowie 51', McGrath 86' (pen.)	19,265	Report
23 September 2025	Falkirk Stadium, Falkirk (A)	Falkirk	2–2	Boyle 30' (pen.), McGrath 42'	7,491	Report
27 September 2025	Celtic Park, Glasgow (A)	Celtic	0–0		58,980	Report
4 October 2025	Tynecastle Park, Edinburgh (A)	Heart of Midlothian	0–1		18,760	Report
18 October 2025	Easter Road, Edinburgh (H)	Livingston	4–0	Klidjé 9', McGrath 52' (pen.), Hoilett 79', 89'	17,947	Report
26 October 2025	Pittodrie Stadium, Aberdeen (A)	Aberdeen	2–1	Klidjé 34', Youan 87'	18,227	Report
29 October 2025	Easter Road, Edinburgh (H)	Rangers	0–1		18,550	Report
1 November 2025	Almondvale Stadium, Livingston (A)	Livingston	2–2	McGrath 1', Boyle 55'	3,921	Report
8 November 2025	St Mirren Park, Paisley (A)	St Mirren	3–0	Mulligan 24', C.Cadden 53', Chaiwa 80'	7,116	Report
22 November 2025	Easter Road, Edinburgh (H)	Dundee	2–0	Bowie 30', McGrath 59'	17,714	Report
25 November 2025	Fir Park, Motherwell (A)	Motherwell	0–2		6,585	Report
30 November 2025	Easter Road, Edinburgh (H)	Celtic	1–2	Boyle 56' (pen.)	18,419	Report
6 December 2025	Easter Road, Edinburgh (H)	Falkirk	3–0	Boyle 36' (pen.), Bowie 41', 80'	18,951	Report
15 December 2025	Ibrox Stadium, Glasgow (A)	Rangers	0–1		50,226	Report
20 December 2025	Tannadice Park, Dundee (A)	Dundee United	1–1	Boyle 38'	10,124	Report
27 December 2025	Easter Road, Edinburgh (H)	Heart of Midlothian	3–2	McGrath 3', Campbell 45', Bowie 48'	20,035	Report
30 December 2025	Easter Road, Edinburgh (H)	Aberdeen	2–0	Klidje 60', Hoilett 90+1'	18,848	Report
3 January 2026	Rugby Park, Kilmarnock (A)	Kilmarnock	3–1	Youan 5', 71', McGrath 90+1' (pen.)	10,124	Report
10 January 2026	Easter Road, Edinburgh (H)	Motherwell	1–1	Bowie 69’	19,246	Report
24 January 2026	Falkirk Stadium, Falkirk (A)	Falkirk	1–4	Bushiri 59’	7,617	Report
1 February 2026	Easter Road, Edinburgh (H)	Rangers	0–0		18,227	Report
4 February 2026	Easter Road, Edinburgh (H)	Dundee United	3–2	Boyle 36’, Graham 89’ (o.g.), Šuto 90+3’	17,655	Report
10 February 2026	Tynecastle Park, Edinburgh (A)	Heart of Midlothian	0–1		18,766	Report
14 February 2026	Easter Road, Edinburgh (H)	St Mirren	2–0	Elding 42’, Šuto 66’	18,012	Report
22 February 2026	Celtic Park, Glasgow (A)	Celtic	2–1	Passlack 24’, Andrews 87’	58,687	Report
28 February 2026	Dens Park, Dundee (A)	Dundee	3–3	Elding 11', Šuto 84', McGrath 89'	7,512	Report
14 March 2026	Easter Road, Edinburgh (H)	Livingston	0–0		18,083	Report
21 March 2026	Fir Park, Motherwell (A)	Motherwell	0–0		9,371	Report
4 April 2026	Easter Road, Edinburgh (H)	Kilmarnock	3–0	Elding 1', Passlack 12', Šuto 90+3'	18,927	Report
11 April 2026	Pittodrie Stadium, Aberdeen (A)	Aberdeen	0–2		18,323	Report
26 April 2026	Easter Road, Edinburgh (H)	Heart of Midlothian	1–2	Boyle 7'	19,502	Report
3 May 2026	Easter Road, Edinburgh (H)	Celtic	1–2	Newell 45+3'	18,113	Report
9 May 2026	Falkirk Stadium, Falkirk (A)	Falkirk	3–1	Campbell 3', 20', Obita 40'	7,644	Report
13 May 2026	Ibrox Stadium, Glasgow (A)	Rangers	2–1	Boyle 5', Scarlett 89'	50,633	Report
16 May 2026	Easter Road, Edinburgh (H)	Motherwell	0–1		19,014	Report

=== Scottish Cup ===
Hibernian's score is shown first in each case.

Hibernian in the 2025–26 Scottish Cup
Date	Round	Venue	Opponents	Score	Hibernian scorers	Att.	Ref.
17 January 2026	Fourth round	East End Park, Dunfermline (A)	Dunfermline Athletic	0–1		10,350	Report

=== Scottish League Cup ===
Having finished in the European qualification places, Hibs entered the League Cup in the second round (last 16).

Hibernian's score is shown first in each case.

Hibernian in the 2025–26 League Cup
Date	Round	Venue	Opponents	Score	Hibernian scorers	Att.	Ref.
17 August 2025	Second round	Almondvale Stadium, Livingston (A)	Livingston	2–0	Klidjé 43', Mulligan 87'	4,696	Report
20 September 2025	Quarter-final	Ibrox Stadium, Glasgow (A)	Rangers	0–2		34,682	Report

=== UEFA Europa League ===
Having finished third in the 2024–25 Scottish Premiership, Hibernian entered the Europa League in the second qualifying round. They were drawn against Danish club Midtjylland, who had finished second in the 2024–25 Danish Superliga. Hibs fell to a 3–2 aggregate defeat, with the Danes scoring the winning goal in the last minutes of extra time.

Hibernian's score is shown first in each case.

Hibernian in the 2025–26 UEFA Europa League
Date	Round	Venue	Opponents	Score	Hibernian scorers	Att.	Ref.
24 July 2025	Second qualifying round	MCH Arena, Herning (A)	(Denmark) Midtjylland	1–1	McGrath 7'	8,863	Report
31 July 2025	Second qualifying round	Easter Road, Edinburgh (H)	(Denmark) Midtjylland	1–2	Bushiri 105+1'	19,536	Report

=== UEFA Conference League ===
After their defeat to Midtjylland in Europa League qualifying, Hibernian entered the Conference League in the third qualifying round. They were drawn against Serbian club Partizan Belgrade, and progressed to the play-off round by winning 4–3 after extra time. Hibs came back from 2–0 and 3–1 down in the play-off round against Polish side Legia Warsaw, but a stoppage-time equaliser and an extra-time winning goal won the tie for Legia. Hibs manager David Gray said he was "immensely proud" of the team, which he believed had produced the best performance of a Hibs side in European competition during his lifetime.

Hibernian's score is shown first in each case.

Hibernian in the 2025–26 UEFA Conference League
Date	Round	Venue	Opponents	Score	Hibernian scorers	Att.	Ref.
7 August 2025	Third qualifying round	Partizan Stadium, Belgrade (A)	(Serbia) FK Partizan	2–0	Boyle 40', 70' (pen.)	26,342	Report
14 August 2025	Third qualifying round	Easter Road, Edinburgh (H)	(Serbia) FK Partizan	2–3	Bowie 59', Cadden 100'	19,377	Report
21 August 2025	Play-off round	Easter Road, Edinburgh (H)	(Poland) Legia Warsaw	1–2	Mulligan 86'	18,958	Report
28 August 2025	Play-off round	Polish Army Stadium, Warsaw (A)	(Poland) Legia Warsaw	3–3	Bushiri 50', Boyle 59', Chaiwa 61'	27,659	Report

== Player statistics ==
As of 16 May 2026

No.	Pos	Player	Premiership		Scottish Cup		League Cup		Europe		Total	
No.	Pos	Player	Apps	Goals	Apps	Goals	Apps	Goals	Apps	Goals	Apps	Goals
Goalkeepers
1	GK	(Austria) Raphael Sallinger	33	0	1	0	2	0	0	0	36	0
13	GK	(England) Jordan Smith	5+1	0	0	0	0	0	6	0	12	0
Defenders
4	DF	(Scotland) Grant Hanley	23+1	0	0	0	2	0	0	0	26	0
5	DF	(Republic of Ireland) Warren O'Hora	27+2	0	1	0	1	0	6	0	37	0
12	DF	(Scotland) Chris Cadden	13+7	1	0	0	0+1	0	6	1	27	2
15	DF	(Australia) Jack Iredale	32+2	0	0	0	1	0	5+1	0	41	0
19	DF	(Scotland) Nicky Cadden	21+4	0	0+1	0	1+1	0	1+3	0	32	0
21	DF	(Uganda) Jordan Obita	19+7	1	1	0	2	0	6	0	35	1
24	DF	(England) Zach Mitchell	1+1	0	0	0	0	0	0	0	2	0
25	DF	(Germany) Felix Passlack	13	2	0	0	0	0	0	0	13	2
27	DF	(England) Kanayo Megwa	8+4	0	1	0	1	0	0+3	0	17	0
33	DF	(Democratic Republic of the Congo) Rocky Bushiri	24+2	3	1	0	1	0	6	2	34	5
42	DF	(Zimbabwe) Munashe Garananga	2	0	0	0	0	0	0	0	2	0
Midfielders
6	MF	(Wales) Dylan Levitt	4+8	0	0	0	1+1	0	6	0	20	0
8	MF	(The Gambia) Alasana Manneh	0+1	0	0	0	1	0	0+3	0	5	0
11	MF	(England) Joe Newell	3+11	1	1	0	0	0	0	0	15	1
14	MF	(Zambia) Miguel Chaiwa	22+7	1	0+1	0	2	0	0+2	1	34	2
17	MF	(Republic of Ireland) Jamie McGrath	31+4	8	1	0	1	0	4+1	1	42	9
20	MF	(Scotland) Josh Mulligan	21+3	1	1	0	1+1	1	6	1	33	3
22	MF	(England) Dan Barlaser	31+3	0	0+1	0	0+1	0	0	0	36	0
28	MF	(Wales) Kai Andrews	1+10	1	0	0	0	0	0	0	11	1
32	MF	(Scotland) Josh Campbell	4+23	3	0	0	1	0	2+3	0	33	3
35	MF	(Scotland) Rudi Molotnikov	0+3	0	0	0	0+1	0	0	0	4	0
Forwards
7	FW	(France) Élie Youan	6+11	4	0+1	0	0+1	0	0+4	0	23	4
9	FW	(Scotland) Kieron Bowie	19+3	8	1	0	1	0	6	1	30	9
10	FW	(Australia) Martin Boyle	26+10	8	0+1	0	2	0	6	3	45	11
18	FW	(Togo) Thibault Klidjé	7+12	3	1	0	1+1	1	0+5	0	27	4
23	FW	(Canada) Junior Hoilett	4+10	3	1	0	0+2	0	0+6	0	23	3
44	FW	(England) Dane Scarlett	6+7	1	0	0	0	0	0	0	13	1
47	FW	(Republic of Ireland) Owen Elding	11+2	3	0	0	0	0	0	0	13	3
77	FW	(Croatia) Ante Šuto	2+12	4	0	0	0	0	0	0	14	4

== Club statistics ==
=== League table ===
Pos	Team	Pld	W	D	L	GF	GA	GD	Pts	Qualification or relegation (Note: Teams played each other three times (33 matches), before the league was split into two groups (the top six and the bottom six).)
3	Rangers	38	20	12	6	76	43	+33	72	Qualification for the Europa League third qualifying round (Note: Since the 2025–26 Scottish Cup winners, Celtic, qualified for the Champions League via league position, the spot reserved for the cup winners (Europa League third qualifying round) was passed to the third-placed team, and the spots for the Conference League second qualifying round were moved down one league position.)
4	Motherwell	38	16	13	9	59	36	+23	61	Qualification for the Conference League second qualifying round
5	Hibernian	38	15	12	11	58	44	+14	57	Qualification for the Conference League second qualifying round
6	Falkirk	38	14	7	17	50	62	−12	49	
7	Dundee United	38	10	15	13	49	60	−11	45	

Rules for classification: 1) Points; 2) Goal difference; 3) Goals scored; 4) Head-to-head points; 5) Head-to-head goal difference; 6) Play-off (only if deciding champion, UEFA competition qualification, second stage group allocation, or relegation).

=== Management statistics ===
As of 16 May 2026

Name	From	To	P	W	D	L	Win% (Note: Win% is the percentage of matches won rounded to two decimal places.)
(Scotland) David Gray	6 June 2024	Present Day	47	18	13	16	38.30

== Transfers ==
=== Players in ===
Player	From	Fee
(Republic of Ireland) Jamie McGrath	(Scotland) Aberdeen	Free
(Austria) Raphael Sallinger	(Austria) TSV Hartberg	Undisclosed
(Scotland) Josh Mulligan	(Scotland) Dundee	Compensation
(Togo) Thibault Klidjé	(Switzerland) Luzern	Undisclosed
(Scotland) Grant Hanley	(England) Birmingham City	Free
(Zambia) Miguel Chaiwa	(Switzerland) Young Boys	Undisclosed
(Republic of Ireland) Owen Elding	(Republic of Ireland) Sligo Rovers	Undisclosed
(Germany) Felix Passlack	(Germany) Vfl Bochum	Undisclosed
(Croatia) Ante Šuto	(Croatia) Slaven Belupo	Undisclosed

=== Players out ===
Player	To	Fee
(England) Dwight Gayle	Retired	
(Poland) Max Boruc	(Denmark) Helsingør	Free
(Liberia) Nohan Kenneh	(England) Tranmere Rovers	Free
(Scotland) Reuben McAllister	Free agent	Free
(Scotland) Murray Aiken	Free agent	Free
(Northern Ireland) Kyle McClelland	(Northern Ireland) Glenavon	Free
(Libya) Malik Zaid	(Scotland) Edinburgh City	Free
(Suriname) Dylan Vente	(Netherlands) Heerenveen	Undisclosed
(Guyana) Nathan Moriah-Welsh	(England) Mansfield Town	Undisclosed
(Portugal) Jair Tavares	(Lithuania) Kauno Žalgiris	Free
(Belgium) Allan Delferrière	Free agent	Free
(Scotland) Oscar MacIntyre	(Scotland) Inverness CT	Undisclosed
(Australia) Lewis Miller	(England) Blackburn Rovers	Undisclosed
(England) Marvin Ekpiteta	(England) MK Dons	Undisclosed
(Scotland) Rory Whittaker	(England) Southampton	Undisclosed
(England) Ben Vickery	(England) Manchester City	£200,000
(Scotland) Kieron Bowie	(Italy) Hellas Verona	£6,000,000
(Wales) Dylan Levitt	(England) Leyton Orient	Undisclosed
(Canada) Junior Hoilett	(England) Swindon Town	Undisclosed

=== Loans in ===
Player	From
(England) Daniel Barlaser	(England) Middlesbrough
(England) Zach Mitchell	(England) Charlton Athletic
(Wales) Kai Andrews	(England) Coventry City
(England) Dane Scarlett	(England) Tottenham Hotspur
(Zimbabwe) Munashe Garananga	(Denmark) Copenhagen

=== Loans out ===
Player	To
(Scotland) Freddie Owens	(Scotland) East Kilbride
(Scotland) Dean Cleland	(Scotland) East Kilbride
(Scotland) Jacob MacIntyre	(Scotland) Arbroath
(Togo) Thibault Klidjé	(Denmark) Randers

== See also ==
- List of Hibernian F.C. seasons
