= 2023–24 Hibernian F.C. season =

Hibernian
2023–24 season
- Chairman: Malcolm McPherson
- Manager: Lee Johnson (until 27 August); David Gray (caretaker) (from 27 August – 11 September and from 14 May); Nick Montgomery (from 11 September – 14 May)
- Stadium: Easter Road
- Premiership: 8th
- Scottish Cup: Quarter-finals
- League Cup: Semi-finals
- Europa Conference League: Play-off round
- Top goalscorer: League: Myziane Maolida (10 goals); All: Martin Boyle; Myziane Maolida (11 each)
- Highest home attendance: 20,150 v. Heart of Midlothian, 27 December 2023
- Lowest home attendance: 14,932 v. Livingston, 26 August 2023
- Average home league attendance: 16,808
| Home colours | Away colours | Third colours |

The 2023–24 season was Hibernian's seventh season of play back in the top flight of Scottish football, having been promoted from the Scottish Championship at the end of the 2016–17 season. Hibs reached the play-off round of the 2023–24 UEFA Europa Conference League, the League Cup semi-finals, and the Scottish Cup quarter-finals, but two managers were sacked as the club finished in the bottom half of the Premiership.

== Results and fixtures ==
Win Draw Loss Postponed

=== Friendlies ===
In addition to the friendly matches played in pre-season, Hibs also played in a testimonial match for Raith Rovers player Lewis Vaughan in March 2024.

| 1 July 2023 Friendly | Edinburgh City | 2–4 | Hibernian | Edinburgh |
| 15:00 BST | Murray 22'; Shanley 38' | Report | Melkersen 40'; Doidge 51', 87'; MacKay 63' | Stadium: Meadowbank Stadium |

| 8 July 2023 Friendly | Europa | 0–2 | Hibernian | Estepona |
| 18:00 BST | | Report | Le Fondre 12'; Campbell 31' | Stadium: Estepona Football Center |

| 13 July 2023 Friendly | Bournemouth | 4–0 | Hibernian | Marbella |
| 18:00 BST | Brooks 3'; Anthony 10'; Billing 65', 88' | Report | | Stadium: Marbella Football Center |

| 21 July 2023 Friendly | Hibernian | 2–1 | Groningen | Edinburgh |
| 19:15 BST | Campbell 54', 56' | Report | van Veen 10' | Stadium: Easter Road; Attendance: 9,113; Referee: Willie Collum |

| 29 July 2023 Friendly | Blackpool | 3–0 | Hibernian | Blackpool |
| 15:00 BST | Lavery 60'; Dougall 84'; Dale 87' | Report | | Stadium: Bloomfield Road |

| 20 March 2024 Testimonial match for Lewis Vaughan | Raith Rovers | 1–5 | Hibernian | Kirkcaldy |
| 19:45 GMT | Smith 72' | Report | Stevenson 34'; Tavares 46'; McAllister 56'; Hanlon 64'; McDonald 77' | Stadium: Starks Park |

=== Scottish Premiership ===
Hibs manager Lee Johnson was sacked by the club on 27 August, following a third consecutive defeat to start the Premiership season. After one league game with David Gray as caretaker, Nick Montgomery was appointed on 11 September. Montgomery was himself sacked on 14 May, following a 4–0 home defeat to Aberdeen and failure to finish in the top half of the league.

| 6 August 2023 1 | Hibernian | 2–3 | St Mirren | Edinburgh |
| 15:00 BST | Le Fondre 72'; Doidge 82' | Report | O'Hara 15' (pen.); Olusanya 17'; Greive 89' | Stadium: Easter Road; Attendance: 17,586; Referee: Euan Anderson |

| 13 August 2023 2 | Motherwell | 2–1 | Hibernian | Motherwell |
| 15:00 BST | Wilkinson 66'; Biereth 85' | Report | Le Fondre 90+4' (pen.) | Stadium: Fir Park; Attendance: 6,262; Referee: Matthew MacDermid |

| 26 August 2023 3 | Hibernian | 2–3 | Livingston | Edinburgh |
| 15:00 BST | Boyle 61'; Campbell 86' | Report | Obita 8' (o.g.); Anderson 63'; Sangare 75' | Stadium: Easter Road; Attendance: 14,932; Referee: Craig Napier |

| 3 September 2023 4 | Aberdeen | 0–2 | Hibernian | Aberdeen |
| 15:00 BST | | Report | Le Fondre 75'; Doidge 81' | Stadium: Pittodrie Stadium; Attendance: 16,471; Referee: David Munro |

| 16 September 2023 5 | Kilmarnock | 2–2 | Hibernian | Kilmarnock |
| 15:00 BST | Vassell 61'; Wright 79' | Report | Dennis 8' (o.g.); Vente 59' | Stadium: Rugby Park; Attendance: 6,277; Referee: David Dickinson |

| 23 September 2023 6 | Hibernian | 2–0 | St Johnstone | Edinburgh |
| 15:00 BST | Miller 35'; Vente 69' | Report | | Stadium: Easter Road; Attendance: 16,850; Referee: Kevin Clancy |

| 30 September 2023 7 | Hibernian | 0–0 | Dundee | Edinburgh |
| 15:00 BST | | Report | | Stadium: Easter Road; Attendance: 16,793; Referee: John Beaton |

| 7 October 2023 8 | Heart of Midlothian | 2–2 | Hibernian | Edinburgh |
| 15:00 BST | Forrest 28'; Doidge 58' (o.g.) | Report | Youan 66', 68' | Stadium: Tynecastle Park; Attendance: 18,675; Referee: Willie Collum |

| 21 October 2023 9 | Rangers | 4–0 | Hibernian | Glasgow |
| 15:00 BST | Sima 17', 65'; Raskin 45'; Dessers 79' | Report | | Stadium: Ibrox Stadium; Attendance: 49,535; Referee: Don Robertson |

| 28 October 2023 10 | Hibernian | 0–0 | Celtic | Edinburgh |
| 15:00 BST | | Report | | Stadium: Easter Road; Attendance: 18,548; Referee: Alan Muir |

| 31 October 2023 11 | Hibernian | 2–2 | Ross County | Edinburgh |
| 19:45 GMT | Purrington 42' (o.g.); Tavares 54' | Report | Delferriere 74' (o.g.); White 82' | Stadium: Easter Road; Attendance: 15,300; Referee: Grant Irvine |

| 8 November 2023 12 | St Mirren | 2–2 | Hibernian | Paisley |
| 19:45 GMT | O'Hara 53' (pen.); Jamieson 90+2' | Report | Campbell 12'; Newell 69' | Stadium: St Mirren Park; Attendance: 5,963; Referee: Steven McLean |

| 11 November 2023 13 | Hibernian | 1–0 | Kilmarnock | Edinburgh |
| 15:00 GMT | Campbell 36' | Report | | Stadium: Easter Road; Attendance: 16,250; Referee: David Dickinson |

| 25 November 2023 14 | Dundee | 1–2 | Hibernian | Dundee |
| 15:00 GMT | Beck 86' | Report | Tavares 16'; Miller 58' | Stadium: Dens Park; Attendance: 6,652; Referee: Don Robertson |

| 3 December 2023 15 | Hibernian | 2–0 | Aberdeen | Edinburgh |
| 15:00 GMT | Vente 18'; Fish 70' | Report | | Stadium: Easter Road; Attendance: 16,592; Referee: Willie Collum |

| 6 December 2023 16 | Celtic | 4–1 | Hibernian | Glasgow |
| 19:45 GMT | Oh 5', 55'; O'Riley 36'; Palma 51' (pen.) | Report | Doidge 72' | Stadium: Celtic Park; Referee: John Beaton |

| 9 December 2023 17 | Livingston | 0–1 | Hibernian | Livingston |
| 15:00 GMT | | Report | Boyle 28' | Stadium: Almondvale Stadium; Attendance: 3,463; Referee: Grant Irvine |

| 16 December 2023 18 | St Johnstone | 1–0 | Hibernian | Perth |
| 15:00 GMT | Carey 57' | Report | | Stadium: McDiarmid Park; Attendance: 4,276; Referee: Graham Grainger |

| 27 December 2023 19 | Hibernian | 0–1 | Heart of Midlothian | Edinburgh |
| 20:00 GMT | | Report | Shankland 90+3' | Stadium: Easter Road; Attendance: 20,150; Referee: Beaton |

| 2 January 2024 20 | Hibernian | 2–2 | Motherwell | Edinburgh |
| 15:00 GMT | Youan 28', 90+1' | Report | Bair 35'; Mugabi 64' | Stadium: Easter Road; Attendance: 16,796; Referee: Don Robertson |

| 24 January 2024 21 | Hibernian | 0–3 | Rangers | Edinburgh |
| 19:45 GMT | | Report | Yilmaz 30'; Cantwell 45+2'; Dessers 74' | Stadium: Easter Road; Attendance: 18,607; Referee: Steven McLean |

| 27 January 2024 22 | Kilmarnock | 2–2 | Hibernian | Kilmarnock |
| 15:00 GMT | Vente 25' (o.g.); Kennedy 54' | Report | Newell 66'; Maolida 81' | Stadium: Rugby Park; Attendance: 6,501; Referee: Grant Irvine |

| 3 February 2024 23 | Hibernian | 0–3 | St Mirren | Edinburgh |
| 15:00 GMT | | Report | Gogic 8'; Kiltie 34' (pen.); Mandron 44' | Stadium: Easter Road; Attendance: 16,689; Referee: William Collum |

| 7 February 2024 24 | Hibernian | 1–2 | Celtic | Edinburgh |
| 19:45 GMT | Levitt 60' | Report | Idah 10' (pen.), 90+2' (pen.) | Stadium: Easter Road; Attendance: 18,303; Referee: Nick Walsh |

| 17 February 2024 25 | Aberdeen | 2–2 | Hibernian | Aberdeen |
| 15:00 GMT | Devlin 15'; McGrath 51' | Report | Boyle 12'; Marcondes 67' | Stadium: Pittodrie Stadium; Attendance: 18,329; Referee: David Munro |

| 24 February 2024 26 | Hibernian | 2–1 | Dundee | Edinburgh |
| 15:00 GMT | Vente 35' (pen.); Maolida 81' | Report | McCowan 78' | Stadium: Easter Road; Attendance: 16,102; Referee: John Beaton |

| 28 February 2024 27 | Heart of Midlothian | 1–1 | Hibernian | Edinburgh |
| 19:45 GMT | Shankland 45+2' (pen.) | Report | Marcondes 28' | Stadium: Tynecastle Park; Attendance: 18,936; Referee: Kevin Clancy |

| 2 March 2024 28 | Hibernian | 2–0 | Ross County | Edinburgh |
| 15:00 GMT | Maolida 59'; Levitt 86' | Report | | Stadium: Easter Road; Attendance: 15,705; Referee: Craig Napier |

| 13 March 2024 29 | Ross County | 2–2 | Hibernian | Dingwall |
| 19:45 GMT | Sims 42'; Dhanda 90+8' | Report | Maolida 53'; Le Fondre 77' | Stadium: Victoria Park; Attendance: 3,774; Referee: David Munro |

| 16 March 2024 30 | Hibernian | 3–0 | Livingston | Edinburgh |
| 15:00 GMT | Obita 5'; Maolida 7'; Le Fondre 22' | Report | | Stadium: Easter Road; Attendance: 15,912; Referee: Nick Walsh |

| 30 March 2024 31 | Rangers | 3–1 | Hibernian | Glasgow |
| 15:00 GMT | Tavernier 26'; Dessers 45+7'; Matondo 85' | Report | Maolida 45+2' | Stadium: Ibrox Stadium; Attendance: 50,304; Referee: David Dickinson |

| 6 April 2024 32 | Hibernian | 1–2 | St Johnstone | Edinburgh |
| 15:00 BST | Cadden 56' | Report | Sidibeh 49'; Gallacher 81' | Stadium: Easter Road; Attendance: 16,735; Referee: Grant Irvine |

| 13 April 2024 33 | Motherwell | 1–1 | Hibernian | Motherwell |
| 15:00 BST | Blaney 90+4' | Report | Maolida 65' (pen.) | Stadium: Fir Park; Attendance: 7,083; Referee: William Collum |

| 27 April 2024 34 | St Johnstone | 1–3 | Hibernian | Perth |
| 15:00 BST | Kimpioka 89' | Report | Marcondes 6'; Hanlon 44'; Vente 76' | Stadium: McDiarmid Park; Attendance: 4,450; Referee: David Munro |

| 4 May 2024 35 | Ross County | 2–1 | Hibernian | Dingwall |
| 15:00 BST | Murray 21'; White 88' | Report | Maolida 15' | Stadium: Victoria Park; Attendance: 3,856; Referee: Don Robertson |

| 12 May 2024 36 | Hibernian | 0–4 | Aberdeen | Edinburgh |
| 15:00 BST | | Report | Clarkson 30'; Polvara 39'; Miovski 52'; Boyd 90+2' | Stadium: Easter Road; Referee: Grant Irvine |

| 15 May 2024 37 | Hibernian | 3–0 | Motherwell | Edinburgh |
| 19:45 BST | Maolida 41' (pen.); Boyle 45', 55' | Report | | Stadium: Easter Road; Attendance: 15,451; Referee: Steven MacLean |

| 19 May 2024 38 | Livingston | 1–1 | Hibernian | Livingston |
| 15:00 BST | Anderson 67' | Report | Maolida 49' | Stadium: Almondvale Stadium; Attendance: 3,064; Referee: David Munro |

=== Scottish Cup ===
As a Premiership club, Hibs entered the Scottish Cup in the fourth round (last 32) and were drawn away to League Two club Forfar Athletic. After "labouring" to a 1–0 win at Station Park, Hibs were drawn away again in the fifth round at Championship side Inverness Caledonian Thistle. They progressed through that round more comfortably, winning 3–1. Hibs were drawn at home to Rangers in the quarter-finals, their first Scottish Cup meeting since the 2016 final. They lost this tie 2–0, with two players were sent off midway through the second half.

| 20 January 2024 Fourth round | Forfar Athletic | 0–1 | Hibernian | Forfar |
| 15:00 GMT | | Report | Doidge 69' | Stadium: Station Park; Attendance: 4,012; Referee: Ross Hardie |

| 10 February 2024 Fifth round | Inverness CT | 1–3 | Hibernian | Inverness |
| 15:00 GMT | Doran 90+5' | Report | Maolida 55'; Boyle 79'; Youan 89' | Stadium: Caledonian Stadium; Attendance: 3,837; Referee: Colin Steven |

| 10 March 2024 Quarter-finals | Hibernian | 0–2 | Rangers | Edinburgh |
| 17:30 GMT | | Report | Lundstram 23'; Silva 83' | Stadium: Easter Road; Attendance: 14,297; Referee: Steven MacLean |

=== Scottish League Cup ===
Having qualified for European competition, Hibs received a bye to the second round (last 16) of the League Cup. At that stage they were drawn at home to Championship club Raith Rovers. A much-changed Hibs side won 2–1 to set up a home quarter-final against St Mirren. Two late goals by Martin Boyle won that tie, which sent Hibs to a semi-final against Aberdeen.

| 20 August 2023 Second round | Hibernian | 2–1 | Raith Rovers | Edinburgh |
| 14:00 BST | Youan 57'; Vente 69' | Report | Smith 68' | Stadium: Easter Road; Attendance: 8,674; Referee: Nick Walsh |

| 27 September 2023 Quarter-finals | Hibernian | 4–2 | St Mirren | Edinburgh |
| 19:45 BST | Youan 52'; Vente 54'; Boyle 80', 90+3' | Report | Tanser 43'; Baccus 76' | Stadium: Easter Road; Attendance: 9,982; Referee: David Munro |

| 4 November 2023 Semi-finals | Hibernian | 0–1 | Aberdeen | Glasgow |
| 17:15 GMT | | Report | Miovski 78' | Stadium: Hampden Park; Attendance: 28,295; Referee: John Beaton |

=== UEFA Europa Conference League ===
Having finished fifth in the 2022–23 Scottish Premiership, Hibs qualified for the 2023–24 UEFA Europa Conference League when league champions Celtic also won the Scottish Cup. In the second qualifying round, Hibs were paired with the winner of an earlier tie between Faroese and Andorran teams. After an embarrassing first leg defeat to the Andorran side Inter Club d'Escaldes, Hibs progressed to the next round with a comfortable aggregate by winning 6–1 in the return game. In the third qualifying round, Hibs produced an impressive 3–1 home win against Swiss club Luzern and backed that up by drawing 2–2 in the second away leg. This set up a play-off tie against Premier League club Aston Villa, where Hibs suffered an 8–0 aggregate defeat.

==== Second qualifying round ====
| 27 July 2023 First leg | Inter Club d'Escaldes (Andorra) | 2–1 | (Scotland) Hibernian | Andorra la Vella |
| 16:00 BST | Gallego 15'; Assoubre 71' | Report | Newell 90+1' | Stadium: Estadi Comunal; Attendance: 223; Referee: Joni Hyytiä (Finland) |

| 3 August 2023 Second leg | Hibernian (Scotland) | 6–1 (7–3 agg.) | (Andorra) Inter Club d'Escaldes | Edinburgh |
| 19:15 BST | Boyle 10', 21'; Doidge 29'; Campbell 48', 61'; Youan 65' | Report | De la Torre 83' | Stadium: Easter Road; Attendance: 13,840; Referee: Peter Kralovic (Slovakia) |

==== Third qualifying round ====
| 10 August 2023 First leg | Hibernian (Scotland) | 3–1 | (Switzerland) Luzern | Edinburgh |
| 19:30 BST | Newell 46'; Vente 72'; Obita 90' | Report | Beka 56' | Stadium: Easter Road; Attendance: 13,075; Referee: Robertas Valikonis (Lithuania) |

| 17 August 2023 Second leg | Luzern (Switzerland) | 2–2 (3–5 agg.) | (Scotland) Hibernian | Luzern |
| 19:45 BST | Kadák 16'; Ademi 67' | Report | Youan 10'; Boyle 73' | Stadium: Swissporarena; Attendance: 13,987; Referee: Aristotelis Diamantopoulos (Greece) |

==== Play-off round ====
| 23 August 2023 First leg | Hibernian (Scotland) | 0–5 | (England) Aston Villa | Edinburgh |
| 17:45 BST | | Report | Watkins 17', 33', 48'; Bailey 42'; Luiz 74' (pen.) | Stadium: Easter Road; Attendance: 19,306; Referee: Ricardo de Burgos Bengoetxea (Spain) |

| 31 August 2023 Second leg | Aston Villa (England) | 3–0 (8–0 agg.) | (Scotland) Hibernian | Birmingham |
| 20:00 BST | Duran 11'; Bailey 34'; Cash 61' | Report | | Stadium: Villa Park; Attendance: 39,467; Referee: Luca Pairetto (Italy) |

== Player statistics ==
As of 19 May 2024

| No. | Pos | Player | Premiership | | Conference League | | League Cup | | Scottish Cup | | Total | |
| No. | Pos | Player | Apps | Goals | Apps | Goals | Apps | Goals | Apps | Goals | Apps | Goals |
Goalkeepers
| 1 | GK | (Scotland) David Marshall | 33 | 0 | 5 | 0 | 3 | 0 | 3 | 0 | 44 | 0 |
| 13 | GK | (Ghana) Jojo Wollacott | 7 | 0 | 1 | 0 | 0 | 0 | 0 | 0 | 8 | 0 |
| 25 | GK | (Poland) Max Boruc | 2 | 0 | 1 | 0 | 0 | 0 | 0 | 0 | 3 | 0 |
Defenders
| 2 | DF | (Australia) Lewis Miller | 21 | 2 | 5 | 0 | 3 | 0 | 1 | 0 | 30 | 2 |
| 4 | DF | (Scotland) Paul Hanlon | 21 | 1 | 6 | 0 | 2 | 0 | 1 | 0 | 30 | 1 |
| 5 | DF | (England) Will Fish | 34 | 1 | 5 | 0 | 3 | 0 | 3 | 0 | 45 | 1 |
| 12 | DF | (Scotland) Chris Cadden | 11 | 1 | 0 | 0 | 0 | 0 | 2 | 0 | 13 | 1 |
| 16 | DF | (Scotland) Lewis Stevenson | 16 | 0 | 6 | 0 | 1 | 0 | 1 | 0 | 24 | 0 |
| 21 | DF | (England) Jordan Obita | 34 | 1 | 5 | 1 | 3 | 0 | 3 | 0 | 45 | 2 |
| 23 | DF | (Australia) Nectarios Triantis | 12 | 0 | 0 | 0 | 0 | 0 | 2 | 0 | 14 | 0 |
| 26 | DF | (England) Riley Harbottle | 1 | 0 | 0 | 0 | 1 | 0 | 0 | 0 | 2 | 0 |
| 33 | DF | (Democratic Republic of the Congo) Rocky Bushiri | 27 | 0 | 5 | 0 | 2 | 0 | 1 | 0 | 35 | 0 |
| 42 | DF | (England) Kanayo Megwa | 4 | 0 | 0 | 0 | 1 | 0 | 0 | 0 | 5 | 0 |
| 49 | DF | (Scotland) Rory Whittaker | 11 | 0 | 0 | 0 | 2 | 0 | 1 | 0 | 14 | 0 |
Midfielders
| 6 | MF | (Wales) Dylan Levitt | 28 | 2 | 4 | 0 | 1 | 0 | 3 | 0 | 36 | 2 |
| 8 | MF | (Republic of Ireland) Jake Doyle-Hayes | 1 | 0 | 4 | 0 | 0 | 0 | 0 | 0 | 5 | 0 |
| 11 | MF | (England) Joe Newell | 37 | 2 | 6 | 2 | 3 | 0 | 3 | 0 | 49 | 4 |
| 14 | MF | (Australia) James Jeggo | 20 | 0 | 5 | 0 | 2 | 0 | 1 | 0 | 28 | 0 |
| 14 | MF | (Spain) Eliezer Mayenda | 2 | 0 | 0 | 0 | 0 | 0 | 2 | 0 | 4 | 0 |
| 15 | MF | (England) Luke Amos | 7 | 0 | 0 | 0 | 0 | 0 | 1 | 0 | 8 | 0 |
| 18 | MF | (Scotland) Ewan Henderson | 1 | 0 | 0 | 0 | 0 | 0 | 0 | 0 | 1 | 0 |
| 20 | MF | (Denmark) Emiliano Marcondes | 15 | 3 | 0 | 0 | 0 | 0 | 2 | 0 | 17 | 3 |
| 27 | MF | (Scotland) Daniel MacKay | 0 | 0 | 1 | 0 | 0 | 0 | 0 | 0 | 1 | 0 |
| 28 | MF | (Belgium) Allan Delferrière | 3 | 0 | 3 | 0 | 1 | 0 | 0 | 0 | 7 | 0 |
| 29 | MF | (Portugal) Jair Tavares | 26 | 2 | 0 | 0 | 1 | 0 | 2 | 0 | 29 | 2 |
| 32 | MF | (Scotland) Josh Campbell | 19 | 3 | 5 | 2 | 3 | 0 | 0 | 0 | 27 | 5 |
| 30 | MF | (Guyana) Nathan Moriah-Welsh | 14 | 0 | 0 | 0 | 0 | 0 | 2 | 0 | 16 | 0 |
| 35 | MF | (Scotland) Rudi Molotnikov | 3 | 0 | 1 | 0 | 0 | 0 | 1 | 0 | 5 | 0 |
| 40 | MF | (Scotland) Reuben McAllister | 0 | 0 | 1 | 0 | 0 | 0 | 0 | 0 | 1 | 0 |
| 44 | MF | (Scotland) Jacob MacIntyre | 1 | 0 | 0 | 0 | 0 | 0 | 0 | 0 | 1 | 0 |
Forwards
| 7 | FW | (France) Élie Youan | 31 | 4 | 6 | 2 | 3 | 2 | 3 | 1 | 43 | 9 |
| 9 | FW | (Suriname) Dylan Vente | 30 | 5 | 3 | 1 | 3 | 2 | 1 | 0 | 37 | 8 |
| 10 | FW | (Australia) Martin Boyle | 31 | 5 | 5 | 3 | 3 | 2 | 2 | 1 | 41 | 11 |
| 17 | FW | (Comoros) Myziane Maolida | 18 | 10 | 0 | 0 | 0 | 0 | 2 | 1 | 20 | 11 |
| 19 | FW | (England) Adam Le Fondre | 24 | 5 | 3 | 0 | 2 | 0 | 1 | 0 | 30 | 5 |
| 20 | FW | (Norway) Elias Melkersen | 1 | 0 | 2 | 0 | 0 | 0 | 0 | 0 | 3 | 0 |
| 22 | FW | (England) Harry McKirdy | 2 | 0 | 0 | 0 | 0 | 0 | 1 | 0 | 3 | 0 |
| 23 | FW | (Wales) Christian Doidge | 18 | 3 | 6 | 1 | 3 | 0 | 1 | 1 | 28 | 5 |
| 53 | FW | (Scotland) Josh Landers | 2 | 0 | 0 | 0 | 1 | 0 | 0 | 0 | 3 | 0 |

== Club statistics ==
=== League table ===
| Pos | Team | Pld | W | D | L | GF | GA | GD | Pts | Qualification or relegation (Note: Teams play each other three times (33 matches), before the league is split into two groups (the top six and the bottom six).) |
|---|---|---|---|---|---|---|---|---|---|---|
| 6 | Dundee | 38 | 10 | 12 | 16 | 49 | 68 | −19 | 42 | |
| 7 | Aberdeen | 38 | 12 | 12 | 14 | 48 | 52 | −4 | 48 | |
| 8 | Hibernian | 38 | 11 | 13 | 14 | 52 | 59 | −7 | 46 | |
| 9 | Motherwell | 38 | 10 | 13 | 15 | 56 | 59 | −3 | 43 | |
| 10 | St Johnstone | 38 | 8 | 11 | 19 | 29 | 54 | −25 | 35 | |

Rules for classification: 1) Points; 2) Goal difference; 3) Goals scored; 4) Head-to-Head points; 5) Head-to-Head goal difference; 6) Play-off (only if deciding champion, UEFA competitions qualification, second stage group allocation or relegation).

=== Management statistics ===
As of 19 May 2024

| Name | From | To | P | W | D | L | Win% (Note: Win% is the percentage of matches won rounded to two decimal places.) |
|---|---|---|---|---|---|---|---|
| (England) Lee Johnson | 1 July 2023 | 27 August 2023 | 9 | 3 | 1 | 5 | 33.33 |
| (Scotland) David Gray | 27 August 2023 | 11 September 2023 | 2 | 1 | 0 | 1 | 50.00 |
| (Scotland) Nick Montgomery | 11 September 2023 | 14 May 2024 | 37 | 12 | 12 | 13 | 32.43 |
| (Scotland) David Gray | 14 May 2024 | 19 May 2024 | 2 | 1 | 1 | 0 | 50.00 |

== Transfers ==
=== Players in ===
| Player | From | Fee |
|---|---|---|
| (France) Elie Youan | (Switzerland) FC St. Gallen | £500,000 |
| (England) Adam Le Fondre | (Australia) Sydney FC | Free |
| (England) Jordan Obita | (England) Wycombe Wanderers | Free |
| (Ghana) Jojo Wollacott | (England) Charlton Athletic | Undisclosed |
| (Poland) Max Boruc | (Poland) Śląsk Wrocław | Undisclosed |
| (Wales) Dylan Levitt | (Scotland) Dundee United | £300,000 |
| (England) Riley Harbottle | (England) Nottingham Forest | Undisclosed |
| (Suriname) Dylan Vente | (Netherlands) Roda JC | £700,000 |
| (England) Luke Amos | (England) Queens Park Rangers | Free |
| (Guyana) Nathan Moriah-Welsh | (England) Bournemouth | Undisclosed |

=== Players out ===
| Player | To | Fee |
|---|---|---|
| (Scotland) Darren McGregor | Retired | |
| (Scotland) Mikey Devlin | (Scotland) Livingston | Free |
| (Republic of Ireland) Aiden McGeady | (Scotland) Ayr United | Free |
| (Poland) Kevin Dąbrowski | (Scotland) Raith Rovers | Free |
| (Scotland) Kevin Nisbet | (England) Millwall | £2,000,000 |
| (Croatia) Marijan Čabraja | (Croatia) HNK Rijeka | Undisclosed |
| (Scotland) Kyle Magennis | (Scotland) Kilmarnock | Free |
| (Norway) Runar Hauge | (Norway) FK Jerv | Free |
| (Scotland) Josh McCulloch | (Scotland) Clyde | Free |
| (Scotland) Ethan Laidlaw | (England) Brentford | Undisclosed |
| (Norway) Elias Melkersen | (Norway) Strømsgodset | £1,200,000 |
| (United States) EJ Johnson | (United States) Pittsburgh Riverhounds SC | Free |
| (Australia) Jimmy Jeggo | (Australia) Melbourne City | Free |
| (Wales) Christian Doidge | (England) Forest Green Rovers | Undisclosed |

=== Loans in ===
| Player | From |
|---|---|
| (England) Will Fish | (England) Manchester United |
| (Comoros) Myziane Maolida | (Germany) Hertha Berlin |
| (Denmark) Emiliano Marcondes | (England) Bournemouth |
| (Australia) Nectarios Triantis | (England) Sunderland |
| (Wales) Owen Bevan | (England) Bournemouth |
| (Spain) Eliezer Mayenda | (England) Sunderland |

=== Loans out ===
| Player | To |
|---|---|
| (Scotland) Murray Aiken | (Scotland) Airdrieonians |
| (Scotland) Josh O'Connor | (Scotland) Airdrieonians |
| (Scotland) Murray Johnson | (Scotland) Queen of the South |
| (Northern Ireland) Kyle McClelland | (Scotland) Queen of the South |
| (Scotland) Dylan Tait | (Scotland) Hamilton Academical |
| (Liberia) Nohan Kenneh | (England) Shrewsbury Town |
| (Scotland) Daniel MacKay | (Scotland) Livingston |
| (Norway) Elias Melkersen | (Norway) Strømsgodset |
| (Scotland) Ewan Henderson | (Belgium) K.V. Oostende |
| (Scotland) Oscar MacIntyre | (Scotland) Queen of the South |
| (England) Kanayo Megwa | (Scotland) Airdrieonians |
| (Libya) Malik Zaid | (Scotland) Edinburgh City |
| (Scotland) Reuben McAllister | (Scotland) Kelty Hearts |
| (Scotland) Dylan Tait | (Scotland) Falkirk |
| (Belgium) Allan Delferrière | (Czech Republic) MFK Vyškov |
| (Poland) Max Boruc | (Scotland) Arbroath |
| (England) Riley Harbottle | (England) Colchester United |
| (England) Harry McKirdy | (England) Swindon Town |
| (Scotland) Oscar MacIntyre | (Scotland) Annan Athletic |
| (England) Kanayo Megwa | (Scotland) Airdrieonians |
| (Scotland) Rudi Molotnikov | (Scotland) Stirling Albion |
| (Scotland) Jacob Blaney | (Scotland) East Fife |

== See also ==
- List of Hibernian F.C. seasons
