= Kieron Bowie =

Scottish footballer (born 2002)

Personal information
- Full name: Kieron Thomas Bowie
- Date of birth: 21 September 2002 (age 24)
- Place of birth: Kirkcaldy, Fife, Scotland
- Height: 1.87 m (6 ft 2 in)
- Position: Forward

Team information
- Current team: Sassuolo (on loan from Hellas Verona)
- Number: 9

Youth career
- Glenrothes Strollers
- Fife Elite FA
- 2018–2019: Raith Rovers

Senior career*
Years	Team	Apps	(Gls)
2019–2020	Raith Rovers	29	(5)
2020–2024	Fulham	0	(0)
2022–2024	→ Northampton Town (loan)	81	(14)
2024–2026	Hibernian	40	(14)
2026–	Hellas Verona	13	(4)
2026–	→ Sassuolo (loan)	7	(1)

International career^{‡}
2021–2024	Scotland U21	12	(3)
2025–	Scotland	7	(1)
- * Club domestic league appearances and goals as of 14:49, 14 September 2026 (UTC) ‡ National team caps and goals as of 16 November 2026

Kieron Thomas Bowie (born 21 September 2002) is a Scottish professional footballer who plays as a forward for Serie A club Sassuolo, on loan from Hellas Verona, and the Scotland national team. He has previously played for Raith Rovers, Fulham, Northampton Town and Hibernian.

== Club career ==
=== Raith Rovers ===
Kieron had previously played for Glenrothes Strollers before a move to his boyhood club Raith Rovers.

He broke into the first team aged only 16 in the tailend of the 2018–19 season as he made four appearances for the Fife-based club. He then went on to make 35 appearances in all competitions the following season, scoring 10 goals and helping the club to a Scottish League One title and promotion to the Championship.

=== Fulham ===
Kieron officially joined Fulham on 1 July 2020 after a pre-contract agreement that was made the previous February.

==== Northampton Town (loan) ====
On 12 July 2022, Bowie joined EFL League Two club Northampton Town on a season-long loan, helping them secure promotion. On 3 July 2023, he re-joined Northampton – now promoted to EFL League One – on another season-long loan. He played a pivotal role in the club's campaign, including scoring their goal of the season. In his two seasons at the club, he made 81 appearances in the league, scoring 14 goals.

=== Hibernian ===
Bowie signed for Scottish Premiership club Hibernian on a four-year contract in August 2024, moving from Fulham for what Hibs described as "a significant fee". Hibs manager David Gray said that "players of Kieron's ability and potential are always in high demand, so to sign a player of his calibre shows the ambition that we've got here." He missed about four months of the 2024–25 season due to a hamstring injury sustained while playing for the Scotland under-21 team in September 2024.

Hibs rejected an offer from Serie A club Hellas Verona in January 2026, but later that month accepted a second offer which set a new club record for the transfer fee received.

=== Hellas Verona ===
Bowie signed for Hellas Verona on 30 January 2026, agreeing a contract that is due to run until the middle of 2030. He scored his first goal in Serie A on 8 March, the winning goal in a 2–1 victory at Bologna. Bowie scored four goals in 13 appearances, but Verona were relegated at the end of the 2025–26 season.

==== Sassuolo (loan) ====
Following Verona's relegation, Bowie stayed in Serie A by joining Sassuolo on loan. The move will become permanent if unspecified conditions are met.

== International career ==
Bowie received his first call-up to the Scotland under-21 team in May 2021. He made his first appearance, as a substitute, in a 2–1 defeat against Northern Ireland on 2 June 2021. He scored two goals in a 3–1 win against Hungary on 13 October 2023, and a winning goal against Malta four days later.

He was selected for the full Scotland squad for the first time in June 2025, and made his international debut in a 4–0 friendly victory over Liechtenstein on 9 June. Bowie was left out of the squad for the 2026 World Cup finals, but was recalled in September 2026. He then scored his first international goal on 3 October 2026, the opening goal in a 2–0 win against North Macedonia.

== Career statistics ==
=== Club ===
As of match played 13 September 2026

Appearances and goals by club, season and competition
Club	Season	League			National cup (Note: Includes Scottish Cup, FA Cup)		League cup (Note: Includes Scottish League Cup, EFL Cup)		Europe		Other		Total	
Club	Season	Division	Apps	Goals	Apps	Goals	Apps	Goals	Apps	Goals	Apps	Goals	Apps	Goals
Raith Rovers	2018–19	Scottish League One	4	0	0	0	0	0	–		0	0	4	0
Raith Rovers	2019–20	Scottish League One	25	5	2	1	4	1	–		4 (Note: Appearances in Scottish Challenge Cup)	3	35	10
Raith Rovers	Total		29	5	2	1	4	1	0	0	4	3	39	10
Fulham	2020–21	Premier League	0	0	0	0	0	0	–		–		0	0
Fulham	2021–22	Championship	0	0	0	0	0	0	–		–		0	0
Fulham	Total		0	0	0	0	0	0	0	0	0	0	0	0
Northampton Town (loan)	2022–23	League Two	37	5	1	0	1	0	–		1 (Note: Appearance in EFL Trophy)	0	40	5
Northampton Town (loan)	2023–24	League One	44	9	0	0	1	0	–		0	0	45	9
Northampton Town (loan)	Total		81	14	1	0	2	0	0	0	1	0	85	14
Hibernian	2024–25	Scottish Premiership	18	6	3	0	1	0	–		–		22	6
Hibernian	2025–26	Scottish Premiership	22	8	1	0	1	0	6 (Note: Appearances in UEFA Europa League and UEFA Conference League)	1	–		30	9
Hibernian	Total		40	14	4	0	2	0	6	1	0	0	52	15
Hellas Verona	2025–26	Serie A	13	4	–		–		–		–		13	4
Sassuolo	2026–27	Serie A	4	1	2	0	–		–		–		6	1
Career total			167	33	9	1	8	1	6	1	5	3	195	44

=== International ===
As of match played 16 November 2026

Appearances and goals by national team and year
National team	Year	Apps	Goals
Scotland	2025	2	0
Scotland	2026	5	1
Total		7	1

Scores and results list Scotland's goal tally first, score column indicates score after each Bowie goal.

List of international goals scored by Kieron Bowie
No.	Date	Venue	Cap	Opponent	Score	Result	Competition
1	3 October 2026	Toše Proeski Arena, Skopje, North Macedonia	5	North Macedonia	1–0	2–0	2026–27 UEFA Nations League B

== Honours ==
Northampton Town

- EFL League Two promotion: 2022–23
