= Martin Boyle =

Scottish-Australian footballer (born 1993)

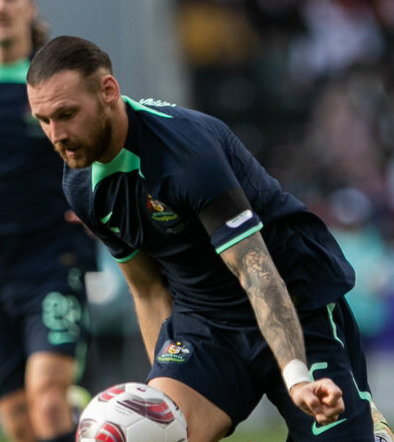
- Boyle playing for Australia at the 2023 AFC Asian Cup

Personal information
- Full name: Martin Callie Boyle
- Date of birth: 25 April 1993 (age 33)
- Place of birth: Aberdeen, Scotland
- Height: 1.72 m (5 ft 8 in)
- Positions: Winger; forward

Team information
- Current team: Hibernian
- Number: 10

Youth career
- Lewis United
- Montrose

Senior career*
Years	Team	Apps	(Gls)
2009–2012	Montrose	64	(25)
2012–2015	Dundee	56	(4)
2013	→ Montrose (loan)	15	(9)
2015	→ Hibernian (loan)	17	(3)
2015–2022	Hibernian	187	(47)
2022	Al-Faisaly	13	(3)
2022–	Hibernian	118	(35)

International career^{‡}
2007–2008	Scotland U16	2	(1)
2018–	Australia	41	(10)
- * Club domestic league appearances and goals as of 22:40, 3 September 2026 (UTC) ‡ National team caps and goals as of 28 March 2026

Martin Callie Boyle (born on 25 April 1993) is a professional association football player who plays for Scottish Premiership club Hibernian. Born in Scotland, he represents the Australia national team. He is a right sided winger who is also capable of playing as a forward.

Boyle has previously played for Montrose, Dundee, and Saudi club Al Faisaly.

== Club career ==
=== Montrose ===
Born in Aberdeen, Boyle started his career with Montrose. He made his first senior appearance in a 2009–10 Scottish Cup tie against Hibernian, aged 16.

Boyle signed a senior contract in August 2010 and scored his first goal for the first team in a victory over Clyde soon after. He followed that up by scoring the winner against Arbroath in the Scottish Cup and ended the season with four goals. Boyle signed a new deal in 2011 and made nine starts and sixteen further substitute appearances in his first season, scoring three goals. In the 2011–12 season, he claimed a starting role and made 41 appearances in all competitions, scoring 22 goals. In the final game of the season, he scored his first senior hat-trick in a 5–0 win over Clyde.

He received an award for scoring most goals in the Scottish Football League. Boyle trained with Aberdeen in the summer of 2012, but returned for pre-season training with Montrose, playing in their 2–0 defeat to Stenhousemuir on 7 July. He made four appearances (one in the league, two in the Challenge Cup and one in the Scottish League Cup) at the outset of the new season.

=== Dundee ===
Boyle signed for Scottish Premier League club Dundee in August 2012. He made his debut coming on as a substitute for Jim McAlister in the Dundee derby on 19 August 2012, which Dundee lost 3–0. However, he only made ten appearances in total for the club, being an unused substitute on several occasions.

In January 2013, Boyle was linked with a move to Alloa Athletic on loan, but the move was cancelled due to a rule which prohibits players from playing for three clubs in one season, having already featured for Dundee and Montrose. Instead, Boyle signed for his former club Montrose on loan for the rest of the season. He made his second debut for the club in a 1–1 draw against Rangers. On the next matchday, 2 February 2013, he scored his first goal since returning in a 4–1 win over East Stirlingshire, which was the start of a run of goalscoring form. On 23 February he scored four goals in a 5–1 win over Annan Athletic. Because of his goalscoring form, Boyle was awarded February's Irn-Bru SFL Young Player of the Month award.

Following his impressive displays at Montrose, Dundee manager John Brown confirmed that Boyle would stay at the club in the 2013–14 season. Boyle scored his first goal for the Dee in a 1–0 win over Hamilton Academical, which was also Paul Hartley's first match as the new Dundee manager. After the match, Hartley praised Boyle's performance and was unaware that it was his first goal. Dundee were promoted to the Scottish Premiership by winning the 2013–14 Scottish Championship. How Dundee Won The League

Boyle made his first Scottish Premiership appearance in the 2014–15 season, coming on as a substitute for Greg Stewart in the 62nd minute of a goalless draw with Inverness Caledonian Thistle on 13 August 2014. He scored his first goal of the season in the second round of the League Cup, in a 4–0 win over Raith Rovers on 26 August. Despite featuring in the first team, Boyle struggled to score his first league goal of the season, and was loaned to second-tier Hibernian for the second half of the 2014–15 season. He was offered a new contract by Dundee after the loan was completed, but he decided to sign permanently with Hibernian.

=== Hibernian ===
Boyle moved to Hibernian in January 2015, in a loan exchange for Alex Harris. He made his debut on 3 January 2015 in the Scottish Championship, as Hibs drew 1–1 with Heart of Midlothian in the Edinburgh derby, and scored his first goal for the club on 31 January 2015, in a 1–1 draw against Raith Rovers. He later scored two goals in the last two games of the season against Alloa Athletic and Falkirk, but suffered a knee injury that caused him to miss the end of season play-offs.

Boyle moved to Hibs on a permanent basis in June 2015, signing a two-year contract. He was an unused substitute as the club won the 2016 Scottish Cup Final. He scored nine goals during the 2016–17 season, as Hibs won promotion to the Premiership.

Boyle signed a new two-year contract with Hibernian in June 2017. After a productive start to the 2017–18 season, this was extended to 2021.

Having made 25 appearances in the first part of the 2018–19 season, Boyle underwent surgery on a knee injury sustained on international duty in January 2019, which prevented him playing any further part in the campaign.

Boyle returned to first team action in July 2019, but suffered a recurrence of the knee injury during a League Cup match at Elgin City. He was not expected to return to playing until 2020, but he returned sooner than expected and made his comeback on 30 October. Boyle scored an injury-time equaliser to earn Hibs a 2–2 draw with Livingston, following this up in December with doubles against Aberdeen and in the Edinburgh derby against Hearts. These performances led to Boyle being named as Premiership player of the month for December 2019.

In August 2020, Boyle and Hibs agreed a new contract, which is due to run until the end of the 2022–23 season. During March 2021 Boyle was criticised by Ross County manager John Hughes for "conning the referee" to win a penalty. A few weeks later Boyle was booked for simulation during a match with Rangers, after which Boyle argued that he needed protection from referees because he was one of the most fouled players in the Scottish league.

Hibs rejected an offer of £500,000 from Aberdeen for Boyle in August 2021. Later that month, Boyle signed a new contract with Hibs that was due to run until the end of the 2023–24 season. Boyle won the Scottish Premiership Player of the Month for August 2021, having scored four goals in four league games that month. A first-half hat-trick against Rangers earned Hibs a place in the League Cup final.

=== Al-Faisaly ===
On 21 January 2022, Boyle left Hibs for an "undisclosed seven-figure sum" to join Saudi Professional League club Al-Faisaly. The club were relegated at the end of the 2021–22 season, which led to speculation that Boyle would return to Scotland.

=== Hibernian (second spell) ===
On 6 August 2022, Hibernian announced that an agreement had been reached with Al-Faisaly on the transfer and subsequent re-signing of Boyle. He scored on his second debut for Hibs a day later, a late equaliser in an Edinburgh derby with Hearts. Boyle suffered a knee injury during a match with St Mirren on 29 October that eventually forced him to withdraw from the Australia squad for the World Cup. When he underwent surgery on his knee, a much more serious tear to his anterior cruciate ligament (ACL) was detected. The recovery from that operation took several months, with Boyle making his return to competitive action in August 2023.

After a 2024–25 season in which Boyle's goals and assists helped the team qualify for European competition, Hibs exercised an option to extend his contract by one year. He scored his 100th competitive goal for Hibs during a 2–0 win against Partizan Belgrade in August 2025. Hibs manager David Gray said Boyle would leave the club at the end of the 2025–26, following the expiry of his contract. On 16 May 2026 however, shortly before the final match of the season kicked off, he signed a new one-year contract.

== International career ==
=== Scotland youth ===
Boyle played for the Scotland under-16 team.

=== Australia ===
Boyle was eligible to play for Scotland, the land of his birth, and Australia national team, as his father Graeme was born in Sydney. He currently holds dual citizenship in both Australia and the United Kingdom. In March 2018, Boyle said that he had applied for an Australian passport. Australia manager Graham Arnold had a meeting with Boyle in September 2018, with a view to selecting him in their next squad. Scotland manager Alex McLeish said that he had considered Boyle for selection in May 2018, but he had missed out due to injury.

Boyle was selected for the Australia squad in October 2018, but was unable to play in their match with Kuwait as he did not yet have an Australian passport. Boyle made his international debut for Australia on 17 November, coming on as a substitute for striker and club teammate Jamie Maclaren in a friendly match against South Korea at Lang Park, Brisbane. In his first start for Australia, Boyle scored two goals and set up the other in a 3–0 win against Lebanon on 20 November. He was selected for the 2019 AFC Asian Cup squad, but had to withdraw due to a knee injury sustained in a warm-up match against Oman.

He was recalled to the Australia squad in November 2019, soon after recovering from a knee operation.

Boyle was named in Australia's squad for the 2022 FIFA World Cup in November 2022. However, he was ruled out of the tournament on 20 November 2022 after succumbing to a knee injury; he was replaced in the squad by Marco Tilio. Despite being unable to take part, he stayed with the squad in Qatar to show support for his teammates, as Australia reached the last sixteen for the second time.

After regaining fitness following his knee injury, Boyle was recalled to the squad in September 2023. He scored a penalty and assisted the other Australia goal for another Scottish-born footballer, Harry Souttar, in his first international since returning from injury, a 2–2 draw with Mexico on 9 September.

Boyle helped the Socceroos qualify for the 2026 World Cup, setting up the winning goal in a 2–1 victory against Saudi Arabia that clinched a place in the finals, but was one of four players cut from the squad selected for the tournament.

== Personal life ==
In 2012, Boyle began a relationship with Aberdonian Scotland women's international footballer Rachael Small; they had known each other since their schooldays at Northfield Academy. They were engaged in 2016, with Rachael moving to Edinburgh to play for Hibernian Women. Their daughter Amelia was born in 2018, and they married in 2019. Due to the upheaval it would cause to their daughter, Rachael opted to stay in Edinburgh when Martin left Hibs to play in Saudi Arabia in January 2022.

== Career statistics ==
=== Club ===
As of matches played on 3 September 2026

Appearances and goals by club, season and competition
Club	Season	League			Scottish Cup		League Cup		Continental		Other		Total	
Club	Season	Division	Apps	Goals	Apps	Goals	Apps	Goals	Apps	Goals	Apps	Goals	Apps	Goals
Montrose	2009–10	Scottish Third Division	5	0	1	0	—		—		—		6	0
Montrose	2010–11	Scottish Third Division	23	3	2	0	—		—		—		25	3
Montrose	2011–12	Scottish Third Division	36	22	—		1	0	—		1	0	38	22
Montrose	Total		64	25	3	0	1	0	—		1	0	69	25
Dundee	2012–13	Scottish Premier League	9	0	1	0	—		—		—		10	0
Dundee	2013–14	Scottish Championship	29	4	1	0	1	0	—		—		31	4
Dundee	2014–15	Scottish Premiership	18	0	1	0	3	1	—		—		22	1
Dundee	Total		56	4	3	0	4	1	—		—		63	5
Montrose (loan)	2012–13	Scottish Third Division	15	9	—		1	1	—		2 (Note: Appearance(s) in Scottish Challenge Cup)	1	18	11
Hibernian (loan)	2014–15	Scottish Championship	17	3	—		—		—		—		17	3
Hibernian	2015–16	Scottish Championship	25	6	3	0	4	0	—		1	0	33	6
Hibernian	2016–17 (Note: Soccerbase did not record two appearances made by Boyle against Brondby IF on 14 July and 21 July 2016 .)	Scottish Championship	34	8	4	0	1	0	2 (Note: Appearances in UEFA Europa League)	0	2	1	43	9
Hibernian	2017–18	Scottish Premiership	34	5	1	0	7	1	—		—		42	6
Hibernian	2018–19 (Note: Soccerbase did not record appearances made by Boyle against Asteras Tripolis on 26 July and 2 August, and Molde on 9 August and 16 August 2018.)	Scottish Premiership	18	4	—		2	0	5	0	—		25	4
Hibernian	2019–20 (Note: One appearance in the 2019–20 Scottish Cup was in a match delayed until October 2020 due to the COVID-19 pandemic.)	Scottish Premiership	20	5	5	1	4	0	—		—		29	6
Hibernian	2020–21	Scottish Premiership	36	12	5	3	7	0	—		—		48	15
Hibernian	2021–22	Scottish Premiership	20	7	—		4	4	4 (Note: Appearances in UEFA Europa Conference League)	3	—		28	14
Hibernian	Total		187	47	18	4	29	5	11	3	3	1	248	60
Al-Faisaly	2021–22	Saudi Pro League	13	3	—		—		6 (Note: Appearances in AFC Champions League)	1	—		19	4
Hibernian	2022–23	Scottish Premiership	12	5	0	0	0	0	—		—		12	5
Hibernian	2023–24	Scottish Premiership	31	5	2	1	3	2	5	3	—		41	11
Hibernian	2024–25	Scottish Premiership	36	15	3	2	5	3	—		—		44	20
Hibernian	2025–26	Scottish Premiership	36	8	1	0	2	0	6 (Note: Two appearances in UEFA Europa League, four appearances and three goals in UEFA Conference League.)	3	—		45	11
Hibernian	2026–27	Scottish Premiership	3	2	0	0	1	0	6	1	—		10	3
Hibernian	Total		118	35	6	3	11	5	17	7	—		152	50
Career total			470	126	30	7	46	12	34	11	6	2	586	158

=== International ===
As of match played 11 October 2025

Appearances and goals by national team and year
National team	Year	Apps	Goals
Australia	2018	2	2
Australia	2019	1	0
Australia	2020	0	0
Australia	2021	9	3
Australia	2022	7	0
Australia	2023	4	1
Australia	2024	7	3
Australia	2025	7	1
Total		37	10

As of match played 20 March 2025
Scores and results list Australia's goal tally first, score column indicates score after each Boyle goal.

List of international goals scored by Martin Boyle
No.	Date	Venue	Cap	Opponent	Score	Result	Competition
1	20 November 2018	Stadium Australia, Sydney, Australia	2	Lebanon	1–0	3–0	Friendly
2	20 November 2018	Stadium Australia, Sydney, Australia	2	Lebanon	2–0	3–0	Friendly
3	11 June 2021	Jaber Al-Ahmad International Stadium, Kuwait City, Kuwait	6	Nepal	3–0	3–0	2022 FIFA World Cup qualification
4	2 September 2021	Khalifa International Stadium, Doha, Qatar	8	China	2–0	3–0	2022 FIFA World Cup qualification
5	7 October 2021	Khalifa International Stadium, Doha, Qatar	9	Oman	2–1	3–1	2022 FIFA World Cup qualification
6	9 September 2023	AT&T Stadium, Arlington, United States	19	Mexico	2–0	2–2	Friendly
7	22 January 2024	Al Janoub Stadium, Doha, Qatar	26	Uzbekistan	1–0	1–1	2023 AFC Asian Cup
8	28 January 2024	Jassim bin Hamad Stadium, Al Rayyan, Qatar	27	Indonesia	2–0	4–0	2023 AFC Asian Cup
9	11 June 2024	Perth Rectangular Stadium, Perth, Australia	29	Palestine	4–0	5–0	2026 FIFA World Cup qualification
10	20 March 2025	Sydney Football Stadium, Sydney, Australia	31	Indonesia	1–0	5–1	2026 FIFA World Cup qualification

== Honours ==
Dundee

- Scottish Championship: 2013–14

Hibernian

- Scottish Cup: 2015–16; runner-up: 2020–21
- Scottish Championship: 2016–17
- Scottish League Cup runner-up: 2015–16, 2021–22

Individual

- Scottish Football League top scorer: 2011–12
- Scottish Premiership Player of the Month: December 2019; August 2021

== See also ==
- List of Australia international footballers born outside Australia
- List of sportspeople who competed for more than one nation
