= Kanayo Megwa =

English footballer (born 2004)

Personal information
- Full name: Kanayochukwu Megwa
- Date of birth: 5 March 2004 (age 22)
- Place of birth: Peckham, London
- Height: 1.79 m (5 ft 10 in)
- Position: Right back

Team information
- Current team: Hibernian
- Number: 27

Youth career
- Brooke House College Football Academy
- 2021–2022: Hibernian

Senior career*
Years	Team	Apps	(Gls)
2023–	Hibernian	19	(0)
2023	→ Kelty Hearts (loan)	9	(0)
2023–2024	→ Airdrieonians (loan)	13	(0)
2024	→ Airdrieonians (loan)	16	(0)
2024–2025	→ Partick Thistle (loan)	26	(0)
- * Club domestic league appearances and goals as of 14:13, 28 October 2026 (UTC)

Kanayochukwu Megwa (born 5 March 2004) is an Nigerian professional footballer who plays as a defender for Scottish Premiership side Hibernian.

== Career ==
=== Hibernian ===
Born in London, Megwa spent time on trial with English Championship clubs including Watford and West Brom before signing with Scottish club Hibernian in the summer of 2021. He signed a new contract with Hibernian in March 2023.

Megwa joined Kelty Hearts of the Scottish League One on loan for the end of the 2022–23 season. He made his league debut on 4 March 2023 for Kelty Hearts against Edinburgh City.

On his return to Hibernian, Megwa trained with the first-team squad on their pre-season tour of Spain. He made his Scottish Premiership debut on 12 August 2023, as a second-half substitute against Motherwell.

In August 2024, Megwa signed a four-year deal which committed him to Hibs until summer 2028.

Kanayo Megwa made his European debut in the 2025-26 Europa League qualifying. He came off the bench in both legs of Hibernian's tie with FC Midtjylland of Denmark, which they lost 3-2 on aggregate.

=== Airdrieonians (loan) ===
In September 2023, he moved on loan to Scottish Championship club Airdrieonians. The following month he made his league debut for Airdrie against Ayr United. Hibs recalled Megwa from his loan at Airdrie in January 2024. After making a few first team appearances for Hibs, he returned on loan to Airdrie a month later.

=== Partick Thistle (loan) ===
Megwa joined Scottish Championship side Partick Thistle on a season long loan in September 2024. He made his debut at right back in a 1-0 home victory over Dunfermline Athletic, wearing shirt number 30. Through the 2024-25 season, Megwa made 30 appearances in all competitions, including starting all four play-off ties the club contested. Megwa registered one assist across all appearances, helping Brian Graham score in a 1-1 home draw with Airdrieonians in February 2025. Megwa returned to his parent club at the conclusion of his loan period following the end of the season.

== Style of play ==
A defender with the potential to be versatile, Megwa played for Hibernian in the UEFA Youth League at right-back, right-wingback, right-sided centre-back in a back four and left-sided and right-sided centre-back in a back three formation.

== Personal life ==
Megwa was born in London and raised in Nigeria to Nigerian parents.

== Career statistics ==
As of match played 15 September 2026

Appearances and goals by club, season and competition
Club	Season	League			Scottish Cup		League Cup		Other		Total	
Club	Season	Division	Apps	Goals	Apps	Goals	Apps	Goals	Apps	Goals	Apps	Goals
Hibernian U20	2022–23	—			—		—		1 (Note: Appearance(s) in Scottish Challenge Cup)	0	1	0
Hibernian U20	2023–24	—			—		—		2	1	2	1
Hibernian U20	2025–26	—			—		—		2	0	2	0
Hibernian U20	Total		—		—		—		5	1	5	1
Hibernian	2023–24	Scottish Premiership	4	0	0	0	1	0	—		5	0
Hibernian	2024–25	Scottish Premiership	0	0	0	0	3	0	—		3	0
Hibernian	2025–26	Scottish Premiership	12	0	1	0	1	0	3 (Note: Appearance(s) in UEFA Europa League)	0	17	0
Hibernian	2026–27	Scottish Premiership	3	0	0	0	2	0	2 (Note: Appearance(s) in UEFA Conference League)	0	7	0
Hibernian	Total		19	0	1	0	7	0	5	0	32	0
Kelty Hearts (loan)	2022–23	Scottish League One	9	0	0	0	0	0	—		9	0
Airdrieonians (loan)	2023–24	Scottish Championship	13	0	1	0	0	0	—		14	0
Airdrieonians (loan)	2023–24	Scottish Championship	14	0	0	0	0	0	2 (Note: Scottish Premiership Play-off)	0	16	0
Partick Thistle (loan)	2024–25	Scottish Championship	26	0	0	0	0	0	4	0	30	0
Career total			81	0	2	0	7	0	16	1	106	1
