= Marvin Ekpiteta =

English footballer (born 1995)

Personal information
- Full name: Marvin Akpereogene Paul Edem Ekpiteta
- Date of birth: 26 August 1995 (age 31)
- Place of birth: Enfield, England
- Height: 6 ft 4 in (1.93 m)
- Position: Centre-back

Team information
- Current team: Milton Keynes Dons
- Number: 21

Youth career
- 2011–2014: Oxford United

Senior career*
Years	Team	Apps	(Gls)
2014–2016	Chelmsford City	58	(3)
2015	→ Witham Town (loan)	4	(0)
2016–2017	Concord Rangers	22	(1)
2017–2018	East Thurrock United	42	(0)
2018–2020	Leyton Orient	74	(6)
2018	→ East Thurrock United (loan)	3	(0)
2020–2024	Blackpool	124	(9)
2024–2025	Hibernian	13	(0)
2025–	Milton Keynes Dons	41	(6)

International career
2013	Nigeria U20	2	(0)
2018	England C	1	(0)
- * Club domestic league appearances and goals as of 15:00, 2 May 2026

Marvin Akpereogene Paul Edem Ekpiteta (born 26 August 1995) is an English professional footballer who plays as a centre-back for EFL League One club Milton Keynes Dons.

He has previously played for Chelmsford City, Witham Town, Concord Rangers, East Thurrock United, Leyton Orient and Blackpool, winning promotion from EFL League One, the third level of the English football league system, in 2021.

== Club career ==
=== Chelmsford City ===
In 2014, Ekpiteta began his senior career at Chelmsford City, following a spell in the youth set-up at Oxford United. In January 2015, Ekpiteta signed dual-registration forms with Witham Town. After making 58 league appearances for Chelmsford, scoring three times, Ekpiteta signed for Essex rivals Concord Rangers in 2016. In January 2017, after making 22 National League South appearances for the club, Ekpiteta signed for East Thurrock United, in a move labelled as "naïve" by Concord manager Adam Flanagan.

=== Leyton Orient ===
On 31 January 2018, Ekpiteta signed for National League club Leyton Orient on a 2 1/2-year contract, being loaned back to East Thurrock as part of the deal. After three games back on loan at East Thurrock, Ekpiteta was recalled from the club, making his Leyton Orient debut in a 1–0 loss away to Dover Athletic on 3 March 2018. On 9 March 2019, Ekpiteta scored the winner for Leyton Orient in a 1–0 win against Wrexham, which saw Orient replace Wrexham at the top of the National League. At the end of the season, Leyton Orient gained promotion, with Ekpiteta making his Football League debut on 3 August 2019 in a 1–0 win against Cheltenham Town.

=== Blackpool ===
Ekpiteta signed a two-year contract with Blackpool on 8 July 2020. He scored his first goal for Blackpool in a 5–0 win over Wigan Athletic on 27 January 2021. He signed another two-year contract with the club on 8 March 2022. Ekpiteta was named Blackpool's player of the season for the 2021–22 season by both the club supporters and his teammates.

On 7 May 2024, Blackpool announced the player would be leaving the club in the summer when his contract expired.

=== Hibernian ===
On 28 June 2024, Ekpiteta agreed to join Scottish Premiership club Hibernian on a three-year deal.

=== Milton Keynes Dons ===
On 8 August 2025, Ekpiteta returned to England, joining League Two club Milton Keynes Dons for an undisclosed fee. He made his debut a day later, coming on as a 78th-minute substitute in a 2–0 away win over Barrow. Ekpiteta scored his first goal for the club on 31 January 2026 in a 2–2 draw away to Grimsby Town.

Following an impressive first season in which he featured 41 times and scored 6 goals, Ekpiteta achieved the third promotion of his career as the club finished in second place.

== International career ==
In 2013, Ekpiteta was called up for Nigeria U20, making two appearances. On 10 October 2018, Ekpiteta made his debut for England C in a 1–0 victory against Estonia U23.

== Personal life ==
Ekpiteta's brother, Marvel, also played professional football.

In May 2022, Ekpiteta's Blackpool teammate Jake Daniels came out as gay. Following his announcement, some of Ekpiteta social media posts dating back to 2012 and 2013 were highlighted as being homophobic. Ekpiteta responded by deleting the posts and issuing an apology, saying that his actions from a decade prior "do not in any way reflect the values [he] hold[s] now". In response, Daniels accepted the apology, and tweeted that he is "proud" of being Ekpiteta's teammate. On 30 May, the Football Association issued Ekpiteta a formal warning for his tweets.

== Career statistics ==
As of 8 August 2026

Appearances and goals by club, season and competition
Club	Season	League			Domestic Cup		League Cup		Other		Total	
Club	Season	Division	Apps	Goals	Apps	Goals	Apps	Goals	Apps	Goals	Apps	Goals
Chelmsford City	2014–15	National League South	25	2	2	0	0	0	0	0	27	2
Chelmsford City	2015–16	National League South	33	1	0	0	0	0	1 (Note: Appearance(s) in FA Trophy)	0	34	1
Chelmsford City	Total		58	3	2	0	0	0	1	0	61	3
Concord Rangers	2016–17	National League South	22	0	0	0	0	0	0	0	22	0
East Thurrock United	2016–17	National League South	16	0	0	0	0	0	0	0	16	0
East Thurrock United	2017–18	National League South	29	0	2	0	0	0	2	0	33	0
East Thurrock United	Total		45	0	2	0	0	0	2	0	49	0
Leyton Orient	2017–18	National League	7	0	0	0	0	0	0	0	7	0
Leyton Orient	2018–19	National League	40	6	0	0	0	0	5	0	40	6
Leyton Orient	2019–20	League Two	27	0	0	0	1	0	4 (Note: Appearance(s) in Football League Trophy)	0	32	0
Leyton Orient	Total		74	6	0	0	1	0	9	0	79	6
Blackpool	2020–21	League One	28	2	4	0	1	0	1 (Note: Appearance in 2020–21 Football League One play-offs)	0	34	2
Blackpool	2021–22	Championship	40	5	1	0	1	0	-	-	42	5
Blackpool	2022–23	Championship	25	1	1	1	1	0	-	-	27	2
Blackpool	2023–24	League One	31	1	3	1	1	0	5	1	40	3
Blackpool	Total		124	9	9	2	4	0	6	1	143	12
Hibernian	2024–25	Scottish Premiership	13	0	0	0	4	1	0	0	17	1
Hibernian	2025–26	Scottish Premiership	0	0	—		—		—		0	0
Hibernian	Total		13	0	0	0	4	1	0	0	17	
Milton Keynes Dons	2025–26	League Two	41	6	2	0	1	0	0	0	44	6
Milton Keynes Dons	2026–27	League One	0	0	0	0	1	0	0	0	1	0
Milton Keynes Dons	Total		41	6	2	0	2	0	0	0	45	6
Career total			353	22	15	2	11	1	18	1	393	28

== Honours ==
Leyton Orient

- National League: 2018–19
- FA Trophy runner-up: 2018–19

Blackpool

- EFL League One play-offs: 2021

Milton Keynes Dons

- EFL League Two runner-up: 2025–26

Individual

- Blackpool Player of the Season: 2021–22
