= Rocky Bushiri =

DR Congolese footballer

Personal information
- Full name: Rocky Bushiri Kisonga
- Date of birth: 30 November 1999 (age 26)
- Place of birth: Democratic Republic of Congo
- Position: Centre-back

Team information
- Current team: Hibernian
- Number: 33

Youth career
- 2014–2017: K.V. Oostende

Senior career*
Years	Team	Apps	(Gls)
2017–2019	K.V. Oostende	2	(0)
2018–2019	→ Eupen (loan)	23	(0)
2019–2022	Norwich City	0	(0)
2019	→ Blackpool (loan)	4	(0)
2020	→ Sint-Truiden (loan)	7	(0)
2020–2021	→ Mechelen (loan)	6	(0)
2021	→ Eupen (loan)	1	(0)
2022	→ Hibernian (loan)	14	(0)
2022–	Hibernian	96	(6)

International career^{‡}
2017	Belgium U19	2	(0)
2018–2019	Belgium U21	7	(0)
2023–	DR Congo	4	(0)
- * Club domestic league appearances and goals as of 20 May 2026 ‡ National team caps and goals as of 01:19, 31 August 2025 (UTC)

Rocky Bushiri Kisonga (born 30 November 1999) is a professional footballer who plays as a centre-back for Scottish Premiership side Hibernian and the DR Congo national team.

He has previously played for K.V. Oostende and Norwich City, spending almost the entirety of his spell at Norwich on loan at other clubs.

Bushiri was born in DR Congo, his family moved to Belgium soon after. He played for Belgian under-19 and under-21 teams. He switched his international allegiance to DR Congo in March 2023, and made his full international debut for them later that year.

== Club career ==
=== Oostende ===
Bushiri joined the youth academy of K.V. Oostende in 2012 after impressing in a provincial tournament representing Walloon Brabant. He signed his first professional contract with Oostende in June 2017, for two years. He made his professional debut in a 1–0 Belgian First Division A loss to KV Mechelen on 9 December 2017, becoming the youngest-ever debutant for Oostende.

=== Norwich City ===
On 3 July 2019, it was announced that Bushiri would join Norwich City on a four-year deal, initially linking up with the U23 squad. On 1 August 2019, Bushiri joined League One club Blackpool on a season-long loan deal. Bushiri scored his first goal for the club in a 1–0 win against Wolverhampton Wanderers U21s in an EFL Trophy tie on 5 November 2019.

On 30 June 2020, Bushiri went out on loan again, this time joining Mechelen on a season-long deal.

On 26 January 2021, Bushiri moved to Belgium side KAS Eupen, on a loan deal until the end of the season.

=== Hibernian ===
On 10 January 2022, Bushiri joined Scottish Premiership side Hibernian on loan for the remainder of the season, with an option to buy in the summer. His number of appearances during the loan triggered that option, and he signed a three-year contract with Hibs in June 2022.

After he played against Morton, whilst he was supposed to be suspended for receiving two cautions in earlier ties, Morton were awarded a default 3–0 victory which led to Hibernian being knocked out of the Scottish League Cup. He played regularly during the first half of the 2022–23 season, but was then unavailable for more than three months due to an ankle injury.

Bushiri scored his first goal for the club on 26 November 2024, scoring a 97th-minute equaliser in a 3–3 draw with Aberdeen. That goal started a club-record run of 17 league games without defeat, with Bushiri featuring regularly as the team finished third in the Premiership.

His contract with Hibernian expired at the end of the 2024–25 season, but he signed a new three-year deal with the club in June 2025.

== International career ==
Bushiri's grandfather, Albert Kisonga, was an ambassador to Belgium. Bushiri represented Belgium in youth internationals up to and including the under-21 level, but changed his international allegiance in March 2023 so that he could play for DR Congo. Bushiri was first selected by DR Congo in June 2023, for two Africa Cup of Nations qualifying matches. He made his full international debut in September 2023, playing in a friendly against South Africa.

Bushiri was selected in the Congolese squad for the 2026 FIFA World Cup, but was forced to withdraw after suffering an achilles tendon injury during the last match of the 2025–26 season.

== Career statistics ==
As of match played on 28 August 2025

Appearances and goals by club, season and competition
Club	Season	League			National Cup (Note: Includes Belgian Cup, Scottish Cup)		League Cup (Note: Includes EFL Cup, Scottish League Cup)		Europe		Other		Total	
Club	Season	Division	Apps	Goals	Apps	Goals	Apps	Goals	Apps	Goals	Apps	Goals	Apps	Goals
KV Oostende	2017–18	Belgian First Division A	2	0	0	0	—		6 (Note: Appearances in UEFA Europa League)	0	0	0	8	0
Eupen (loan)	2018–19	Belgian First Division A	23	0	2	1	—		8	0	0	0	33	1
Norwich City	2019–20	Premier League	0	0	0	0	0	0	—		—		0	0
Norwich City	2020–21	Championship	0	0	0	0	0	0	—		—		0	0
Norwich City	2021–22	Premier League	0	0	0	0	0	0	—		—		0	0
Norwich City	Total		0	0	0	0	0	0	0	0	0	0	0	0
Blackpool (loan)	2019–20	League One	4	0	0	0	1	0	—		2 (Note: Appearances in EFL Trophy)	1	7	1
Sint-Truiden (loan)	2019–20	Belgian First Division A	7	0	0	0	—		—		—		7	0
Mechelen (loan)	2020–21	Belgian First Division A	6	0	0	0	—		—		—		6	0
Eupen (loan)	2020–21	Belgian First Division A	1	0	2	1	—		—		—		3	1
Hibernian (loan)	2021–22	Scottish Premiership	14	0	1	0	—		—		—		15	0
Hibernian	2022–23	Scottish Premiership	15	0	1	0	4	0	—		—		20	0
Hibernian	2023–24	Scottish Premiership	26	2	1	0	2	0	5 (Note: Appearances in UEFA Europa Conference League)	0	0	0	34	2
Hibernian	2024–25	Scottish Premiership	28	3	3	1	4	0	0	0	0	0	35	4
Hibernian	2025–26	Scottish Premiership	2	1	0	0	0	0	6 (Note: Two appearances and one goal in UEFA Europa League; four appearances and one goal in UEFA Conference League)	2	0	0	8	3
Hibernian	Total		71	6	5	1	10	0	11	2	0	0	97	9
Career total			128	6	10	3	11	0	25	2	2	1	176	12

=== International ===
As of match played 25 March 2026

Appearances and goals by national team and year
National team	Year	Apps	Goals
DR Congo	2023	1	0
DR Congo	2024	1	0
DR Congo	2025	5	1
DR Congo	2026	1	0
Total		8	1

Scores and results list DR Congo's goal tally first, score column indicates score after each Bushiri goal.

List of international goals scored by Rocky Bushiri
No.	Date	Venue	Opponent	Score	Result	Competition
1	16 December 2025	Pinatar Arena, San Pedro del Pinatar, Spain	Zambia	2–0	2–0	Friendly
