= Jordan Obita =

Uganda international footballer (born 1993)

Personal information
- Full name: Jordan John Obita
- Date of birth: 8 December 1993 (age 32)
- Place of birth: Oxford, England
- Height: 5 ft 11 in (1.80 m)
- Positions: Left back; winger

Team information
- Current team: Hibernian
- Number: 21

Youth career
- 2001–2010: Reading

Senior career*
| Years | Team | Apps | (Gls) |
| 2010–2020 | Reading | 163 | (5) |
| 2012 | → Barnet (loan) | 5 | (0) |
| 2012 | → Gillingham (loan) | 6 | (3) |
| 2012 | → Portsmouth (loan) | 8 | (1) |
| 2013 | → Oldham Athletic (loan) | 8 | (0) |
| 2020–2021 | Oxford United | 12 | (1) |
| 2021–2023 | Wycombe Wanderers | 79 | (5) |
| 2023– | Hibernian | 95 | (2) |

International career^{‡}
| 2010 | England U18 | 1 | (1) |
| 2011 | England U19 | 6 | (0) |
| 2014 | England U20 | 2 | (1) |
| 2025– | Uganda | 6 | (0) |
- * Club domestic league appearances and goals as of 20 May 2026 ‡ National team caps and goals as of 09:49, 15 October 2025 (UTC)

Jordan John Obita (born 8 December 1993) is a professional footballer who plays as left-back or winger for Scottish Premiership club Hibernian, and the Uganda national football team.

He has previously played for Reading, Barnet, Gillingham, Portsmouth, Oldham Athletic, Oxford United, and Wycombe Wanderers. Born in England, Obita represented England in youth internationals up to the under-20 level and made his full international debut for Uganda Cranes in June 2025.

== Club career ==
=== Reading ===
==== Early career and loans ====
Born in Oxford, Obita had trials with his hometown club, but chose instead to sign for Reading, joining their Academy at the age of seven. He played initially as a central midfielder but competition for places and his abundance of pace meant he was moved out to the wing. He made his first team debut for Reading aged 16 in the first round of the League Cup against Torquay United on 11 August 2010, coming on as a 113th-minute substitute for Michail Antonio. He travelled with the first team squad for Reading's pre-season trip to Slovenia prior to the 2011–12 season and made his first senior start in a League Cup game against Charlton Athletic in August that season.

On 27 January 2012 he signed for League Two side Barnet on loan, making his debut for the club the following day against Crewe Alexandra. After one month with Barnet he joined Gillingham on a similar arrangement and scored his first professional goal against his former loan side. He scored twice in the next game against Cheltenham Town and made a further three appearances before returning to Reading in April after turning down the chance to extend his stay. During his loan spell he was also nominated for 2011–12 Football League Championship Apprentice of the Year though he ultimately lost out to Coventry City's Gael Bigirimana.

In August Obita signed for League One club Portsmouth on a one-month loan, adding that he "didn't have to think twice" about joining the club. Later that evening he made his debut against Colchester United and scored a late equaliser with his first touch. His loan was extended for a second month in September though he eventually returned to Reading a few days early following a death in his family. He left on loan again in January 2013, signing a one-month agreement with Oldham Athletic. He scored his first goal for the club in their televised FA Cup fifth round tie against Everton the following month. After expressing an interest in extending his stay with the club, his loan was renewed for a second month after which he returned to Reading. Despite the option of remaining at Oldham, Obita ended his spell early with a view to impressing incoming Reading manager Nigel Adkins and breaking into the first team.

==== First team breakthrough and departure ====
He made his first Reading appearance for two years in their heavy 6–0 League Cup defeat to Peterborough United in August 2013 before making his league debut a month later at Derby County. After securing his place in first team squad for the following games he expressed his desire to play in a central midfield role, a position he played in during his formative Academy years. In November, he scored his first goal for the club with the winner in a 3–2 victory away at Nottingham Forest and the following month signed a new contract until the summer of 2017. In the second half of the season, the absence of Wayne Bridge through long-term injury, and the inability of Stephen Kelly and Shaun Cummings to cement their place in his stead, saw Obita move to left-back for the game against Watford. He helped the team keep a clean sheet in a 1–0 win and provided the assist for Kaspars Gorkšs' early winner. He retained his place for the next game, a 7–1 win against Bolton Wanderers, and from then on was a regular in the team, making 22 of his 36 appearances after his move to full-back. He was praised by club captain Jobi McAnuff who described his adaptation to the left-back role as "fantastic", and was voted as the club's Player of the Season for 2013–14 by the fans. Obita signed a new contract, keeping him at the club until the summer of 2018, on 30 July 2015. On 30 August 2017, Reading announced that Obita had signed a new three-year contract, keeping him at the club until 2020.

With his contract with Reading due to expire on 30 June 2020, and due to the effects of the COVID-19 pandemic on the 2019–20 season, Obita signed a short-term extension with Reading until the end of the season on 26 June 2020. Following the completion of the 2019–20 season, Reading announced that Obita would leave the club at the end of July 2020.

=== Oxford United ===
On 9 November, he signed for League One club Oxford United, his hometown club.

=== Wycombe Wanderers ===
On 29 January 2021, Obita joined Championship side Wycombe Wanderers on a two-and-a-half-year deal for an undisclosed fee. He left Wycombe during the 2023 close season after rejecting a new contract offer.

=== Hibernian ===
On 22 June 2023, Hibernian announced the signing of Obita to a two-year contract, with the option for a third year. On 19 March 2024 Hibernian announced that Obita had signed a new contract with the club until 30 June 2026. He extended that contract by another year in July 2025.

== International career ==
Obita was born in England and is of Ugandan descent.

Obita represented England at under-18 and under-19 level. In May 2014 he was called up by the England under-20s and under-21s for the Toulon Tournament and a game against Wales. He was an unused substitute for the game against Wales, but started the first game of the Toulon Tournament and scored the opening goal in a 3–0 win over Qatar.

In May 2025, Obita was called up to the Uganda squad for the first time for their matches against Cameroon and Gambia on 6 and 9 June.

== Career statistics ==
=== Club ===
As of match played on 4 October 2025

Appearances and goals by club, season and competition
| Club | Season | League | | | National cup (Note: Includes FA Cup, Scottish Cup) | | League cup (Note: Includes EFL Cup, Scottish League Cup) | | Europe | | Other | | Total | |
| Club | Season | Division | Apps | Goals | Apps | Goals | Apps | Goals | Apps | Goals | Apps | Goals | Apps | Goals |
|---|---|---|---|---|---|---|---|---|---|---|---|---|---|---|
| Reading | 2010–11 | Championship | 0 | 0 | 0 | 0 | 1 | 0 | — | | 0 | 0 | 1 | 0 |
| Reading | 2011–12 | Championship | 0 | 0 | 0 | 0 | 1 | 0 | — | | — | | 1 | 0 |
| Reading | 2012–13 | Premier League | 0 | 0 | 0 | 0 | 0 | 0 | — | | — | | 0 | 0 |
| Reading | 2013–14 | Championship | 34 | 1 | 1 | 0 | 1 | 0 | — | | — | | 36 | 1 |
| Reading | 2014–15 | Championship | 43 | 0 | 6 | 0 | 2 | 0 | — | | — | | 51 | 0 |
| Reading | 2015–16 | Championship | 26 | 0 | 3 | 0 | 1 | 0 | — | | — | | 30 | 0 |
| Reading | 2016–17 | Championship | 37 | 2 | 1 | 0 | 3 | 0 | — | | 2 (Note: Appearances in Championship play-offs) | 1 | 43 | 3 |
| Reading | 2017–18 | Championship | 2 | 0 | 0 | 0 | 1 | 0 | — | | — | | 3 | 0 |
| Reading | 2018–19 | Championship | 0 | 0 | 0 | 0 | 0 | 0 | — | | — | | 0 | 0 |
| Reading | 2019–20 | Championship | 21 | 2 | 4 | 1 | 1 | 0 | — | | — | | 26 | 3 |
| Reading | Total | | 163 | 5 | 15 | 1 | 11 | 0 | — | | 2 | 1 | 191 | 7 |
| Barnet (loan) | 2011–12 | League Two | 5 | 0 | 0 | 0 | 0 | 0 | — | | 1 (Note: Appearance in Football League Trophy) | 0 | 6 | 0 |
| Gillingham (loan) | 2011–12 | League Two | 6 | 3 | 0 | 0 | 0 | 0 | — | | 0 | 0 | 6 | 3 |
| Portsmouth (loan) | 2012–13 | League One | 8 | 1 | 0 | 0 | 0 | 0 | — | | 0 | 0 | 8 | 1 |
| Oldham Athletic (loan) | 2012–13 | League One | 8 | 0 | 2 | 1 | 0 | 0 | — | | 0 | 0 | 10 | 1 |
| Oxford United | 2020–21 | League One | 12 | 1 | 0 | 0 | 0 | 0 | — | | 3 (Note: Appearances in EFL Trophy) | 0 | 15 | 1 |
| Wycombe Wanderers | 2020–21 | Championship | 9 | 0 | 0 | 0 | 0 | 0 | — | | — | | 9 | 0 |
| Wycombe Wanderers | 2021–22 | League One | 41 | 5 | 2 | 0 | 3 | 0 | — | | 6 (Note: Three appearances in EFL Trophy, three appearances in League One play-offs) | 0 | 52 | 5 |
| Wycombe Wanderers | 2022–23 | League One | 29 | 0 | 1 | 0 | 2 | 0 | — | | 2 | 0 | 34 | 0 |
| Wycombe Wanderers | Total | | 79 | 5 | 3 | 0 | 5 | 0 | — | | 8 | 0 | 95 | 5 |
| Hibernian | 2023–24 | Scottish Premiership | 34 | 1 | 3 | 0 | 3 | 0 | 5 (Note: Appearances in UEFA Europa Conference League) | 1 | — | | 45 | 2 |
| Hibernian | 2024–25 | Scottish Premiership | 35 | 1 | 2 | 0 | 5 | 0 | — | | — | | 42 | 1 |
| Hibernian | 2025–26 | Scottish Premiership | 7 | 0 | 0 | 0 | 2 | 0 | 6 (Note: Two appearances in the UEFA Europa League, four appearances in the UEFA Conference League) | 0 | — | | 15 | 0 |
| Hibernian | Total | | 76 | 2 | 5 | 0 | 10 | 0 | 11 | 1 | — | | 102 | 3 |
| Career total | | | 357 | 17 | 25 | 2 | 26 | 0 | 11 | 1 | 14 | 1 | 433 | 21 |

=== International ===
As of match played 14 October 2025

Appearances and goals by national team and year
| National team | Year | Apps | Goals |
|---|---|---|---|
| Uganda | 2025 | 6 | 0 |
| Total | | 6 | 0 |

== Honours ==
- Reading Player of the Season: 2013–14
- Maurice Edelston Memorial Trophy: 2008–09
