= Reuben McAllister =

Scottish professional footballer (born 2006)

Personal information
- Date of birth: 10 June 2006 (age 20)
- Place of birth: Livingston, Scotland
- Height: 1.78 m (5 ft 10 in)
- Position: Midfielder

Team information
- Current team: Cove Rangers
- Number: 17

Youth career
- 2015–2022: Bristol City
- 2022–2023: Hibernian

Senior career*
Years	Team	Apps	(Gls)
2023–2025	Hibernian	0	(0)
2024	→ Kelty Hearts (loan)	10	(0)
2024	→ Cove Rangers (loan)	8	(0)
2025	→ Forfar Athletic (loan)	16	(4)
2025-	Cove Rangers	22	(1)
- * Club domestic league appearances and goals as of 4 May 2026

Reuben McAllister (born 10 June 2006) is a Scottish professional football player who plays for Scottish League One club Cove Rangers.

== Career ==
=== Bristol City ===
McAllister joined Bristol City at nine years old. He featured for the Bristol City Under-23 side at the age of just 15 years-old in a 2-0 defeat against Queens Park Rangers in October 2021.

=== Hibernian ===
McAllister left Bristol City for Hibernian in July 2022 for an undisclosed six-figure fee that reportedly could rise to £500,000 should certain clauses be met. Hibs manager Lee Johnson described him as a "top young player". He agreed a three-year deal at Easter Road and was expected to move straight into the Hibs development team. He was named among the first-team match day substitutes on 27 July 2023, in the UEFA Europa Conference League against Inter Club d'Escaldes. He made his professional debut in the second leg of the fixture, on 3 August 2023.

McAllister was loaned to Scottish League One club Kelty Hearts in January 2024.

He was released by Hibs in May 2025, at the end of his contract.

== Style of play ==
McAllister has been described as creative left footed midfield player with an eye for a pass.

== Personal life ==
He is the son of Scottish former international football player Jamie McAllister.

== Career statistics ==
As of match played 18 October 2025

Appearances and goals by club, season and competition
Club	Season	League			Scottish Cup		Scottish League Cup		Continental		Other		Total	
Club	Season	Division	Apps	Goals	Apps	Goals	Apps	Goals	Apps	Goals	Apps	Goals	Apps	Goals
Hibernian	2023–24	Scottish Premiership	0	0	0	0	0	0	1 (Note: Appearance(s) in UEFA Europa Conference League)	0	—		1	0
Hibernian	2024–25	Scottish Premiership	0	0	0	0	0	0	—		—		0	0
Hibernian	Total		0	0	0	0	0	0	1	0	—		1	0
Hibernian B	2023–24	—			—		—		—		2 (Note: Appearance(s) in Scottish Challenge Cup)	0	2	0
Hibernian B	2024–25	—			—		—		—		1	1	1	1
Hibernian B	Total		—		—		—		—		3	1	3	1
Kelty Hearts (loan)	2023–24	Scottish League One	10	0	1	0	—		—		—		11	0
Cove Rangers (loan)	2024–25	Scottish League One	8	0	1	0	0	0	—		0	0	9	0
Forfar Athletic (loan)	2024–25	Scottish League Two	16	4	—		—		—		—		16	4
Cove Rangers	2025–26	Scottish League One	1	0	0	0	0	0	—		0	0	1	0
Career total			35	4	2	0	0	0	1	0	3	1	41	5
