= Max Boruc =

Polish association football player

Personal information
- Full name: Maksymilian Paweł Boruc
- Date of birth: 15 November 2002 (age 23)
- Place of birth: Warsaw, Poland
- Height: 1.95 m (6 ft 5 in)
- Position: Goalkeeper

Youth career
- IFK Värnamo
- Husqvarna FF
- Värnamo Södra FF
- Stoke City
- 2019–2021: West Bromwich Albion

Senior career*
Years	Team	Apps	(Gls)
2021–2023	Śląsk Wrocław	0	(0)
2021–2023	Śląsk Wrocław II	12	(0)
2023–2025	Hibernian	2	(0)
2024	→ Arbroath (loan)	13	(0)
2025–2026	Helsingør	24	(0)
- * Club domestic league appearances and goals as of 15 October 2026

Maksymilian Paweł Boruc (born 15 November 2002) is a Polish professional footballer who plays as a goalkeeper.

== Career ==
Boruc began his career with Swedish sides IFK Värnamo, Husqvarna FF and Värnamo Södra FF, before spells in England with Stoke City and West Bromwich Albion. He switched back to his homeland team, Śląsk Wrocław where he played for their reserve team.

Boruc joined Scottish club Hibernian in June 2023 on a two-year deal. He made his first team debut on 3 August 2023, appearing as a substitute in a Europa Conference League game against Inter Club d'Escaldes. He then made his league debut on 26 August, appearing as a substitute in a 3–2 defeat against Livingston.

Boruc was loaned to Championship club Arbroath in January 2024. He saved a penalty on his debut for Arbroath, a 2–0 defeat at Ayr United on 23 January. At the end of the season, he returned to Hibernian.

He was released by Hibernian in May 2025, at the end of his contract.

On 31 July 2025, Boruc signed for Danish 2nd Division club FC Helsingør. He was released at the end of the season.

== Personal life ==
He is a distant cousin of fellow goalkeeper Artur Boruc.

== Career statistics ==
As of match played on 17 May 2026

Appearances and goals by club, season and competition
Club	Season	League			National cup (Note: Includes Polish Cup, Danish Cup)		League cup		Other		Total	
Club	Season	Division	Apps	Goals	Apps	Goals	Apps	Goals	Apps	Goals	Apps	Goals
Śląsk Wrocław II	2021–22	II liga	12	0	1	0	—		—		13	0
Śląsk Wrocław II	2022–23	II liga	0	0	0	0	—		—		0	0
Śląsk Wrocław II	Total		12	0	1	0	—		—		13	0
Hibernian	2023–24	Scottish Premiership	2	0	0	0	0	0	1 (Note: Appearance in UEFA Europa Conference League)	0	3	0
Hibernian	2024–25	Scottish Premiership	0	0	0	0	0	0	0	0	0	0
Hibernian	Total		2	0	0	0	0	0	1	0	3	0
Arbroath (loan)	2023–24	Scottish Championship	13	0	—		—		—		13	0
Helsingør	2025–26	Danish 2nd Division	24	0	1	0	—		—		25	0
Career totals			51	0	2	0	0	0	1	0	54	0
