= Murray Johnson =

Scottish footballer (born 2004)

Personal information
- Date of birth: 13 November 2004 (age 21)
- Place of birth: Edinburgh, Scotland
- Height: 1.91 m (6 ft 3 in)
- Position: Goalkeeper

Team information
- Current team: Hibernian
- Number: 31

Senior career*
Years	Team	Apps	(Gls)
2021–	Hibernian	0	(0)
2022–2023	→ Airdrieonians (loan)	6	(0)
2023	→ Queen of the South (loan)	0	(0)
2024–2025	→ Airdrieonians (loan)	11	(0)
2025	→ Queen of the South (loan)	1	(0)
2026	→ Greenock Morton (loan)	10	(0)
2026	→ Shelbourne (loan)	0	(0)

International career^{‡}
2019	Scotland U-16	3	(0)
2022–2023	Scotland U-19	5	(0)
2023–	Scotland U-21	1	(0)
2025	Scotland U-20	1	(0)
- * Club domestic league appearances and goals as of 19:30, 10 November 2026 (GMT) ‡ National team caps and goals as of 10:31, 21 April 2025 (GMT)

Murray Johnson (born 13 November 2004) is a Scottish footballer who plays as a goalkeeper for Scottish Premiership club Hibernian. He has had previous loan spells with Airdrieonians, Queen of the South, Greenock Morton and Shelbourne.

== Career ==
A Hibernian youth graduate, and a Scotland youth international, he signed a professional contract with the Hibees in January 2021. Johnson was on loan at Scottish League One club Airdrieonians as a seventeen year-old, winning the club’s Player of the Month award.

In February 2023, Johnson signed a new four-year contract with Hibernian. Johnson joined Queen of the South on a planned season-long loan prior to the start of the 2023-24 season. He made his debut for Queen of the South on 22 July 2023 in the Scottish League Cup, keeping a clean sheet against Elgin City, although he was recalled and the loan cancelled by his parent club on 4 August 2023 after two of their other goalkeepers were injured in a midweek European match.

On 14 June 2024, Johnson returned to Airdrieonians, now in the Scottish Championship, on loan. On 31 January 2025 he returned to Queen of the South, also on loan.

In February 2026 he moved on loan to Greenock Morton in the Scottish Championship to cover a goalkeeping injury. He was included in the SPFL Team of the Week as "the standout goalkeeping option" across the Scottish leagues for his performance against Ayr United.

On 22 July 2026, Johnson joined League of Ireland Premier Division club Shelbourne on loan until the end of their season in November.

== International career ==
A Scotland international at under-16, under-17 and under-19 level, he received his first call-up to the Scotland national under-21 football team in March 2023, earning subsequent squad call ups in September 2024 and October 2024. On 21 March 2025 he made his debut at under-21 level, playing 45 minutes in a 2-0 victory over the Republic of Ireland under-21 football team. He was also capped at U-20 level on 23 May 2025.

Johnson has also represented Scotland at cricket at under-15 level.
