= Josh O'Connor (footballer) =

Scottish footballer

Personal information
- Date of birth: 16 June 2004 (age 22)
- Place of birth: Edinburgh, Scotland
- Position: Forward

Team information
- Current team: Elgin City

Youth career
- –2022: Hibernian

Senior career*
Years	Team	Apps	(Gls)
2022–2024	Hibernian	3	(0)
2023–2024	→ Airdrieonians (loan)	22	(2)
2024	→ Dundalk (loan)	1	(0)
2024–2025	Crusaders	11	(0)
2025	East Kilbride	0	(0)
2025–	Elgin City	12	(0)
2026	→ Tranent (loan)	10	(1)
- * Club domestic league appearances and goals as of 4 May 2026

Josh O'Connor (born 16 June 2004) is a Scottish professional footballer who plays as a forward for Scottish League Two side Elgin City.

== Club career ==
In January 2021, O'Connor agreed to his first professional contract with Hibernian and made his first team debut in March 2022.

O'Connor signed a two-year contract with Hibs in May 2023, while the club also announced that he would be loaned to Airdrieonians for the 2023–24 season. He won the Scottish Challenge Cup with Airdrie, where in the final he won the penalty kick (scored by Nikolay Todorov) that won the game.

On 1 January 2025, O'Connor signed for NIFL Premiership side Crusaders on an 18 month contract.

== Personal life ==
Josh O'Connor is the son of former Scottish footballer Garry O'Connor.

== Career statistics ==
As of match played 26 April 2025

Appearances and goals by club, season and competition
Club	Season	League			National cup (Note: Includes Scottish Cup, FAI Cup, Irish Cup)		League cup (Note: Includes Scottish League Cup, NIFL Cup)		Continental		Other		Total	
Club	Season	Division	Apps	Goals	Apps	Goals	Apps	Goals	Apps	Goals	Apps	Goals	Apps	Goals
Hibernian B	2021-22	—			—		—		—		1 (Note: Appearance(s) in Scottish Challenge Cup)	0	1	0
Hibernian B	2022-23	—			—		—		—		1	0	1	0
Hibernian B	Total		—		—		—		—		2	0	2	0
Hibernian	2021-22	Scottish Premiership	1	0	0	0	0	0	0	0	—		1	0
Hibernian	2022-23	Scottish Premiership	2	0	0	0	0	0	—		—		2	0
Hibernian	2023-24	Scottish Premiership	0	0	0	0	0	0	0	0	—		0	0
Hibernian	Total		3	0	0	0	0	0	0	0	—		3	0
Airdrieonians (loan)	2023-24	Scottish Championship	22	2	2	0	5	2	—		4	1	33	5
Dundalk (loan)	2024	LOI Premier Division	1	0	0	0	—		—		—		1	0
Crusaders	2024-25	NIFL Premiership	11	0	3	0	1	0	0	0	—		15	0
Career total			37	2	5	0	6	2	0	0	6	1	54	5
