= Rudi Molotnikov =

Scottish association football player

Personal information
- Full name: Rudi Allan Molotnikov
- Date of birth: 23 May 2006 (age 20)
- Position: Midfielder

Team information
- Current team: Arbroath (on loan from Hibernian)
- Number: 24

Youth career
- Lochend BC
- 2016-2023: Hibernian

Senior career*
Years	Team	Apps	(Gls)
2023–	Hibernian	19	(0)
2024	→ Stirling Albion (loan)	6	(0)
2026–	→ Arbroath (loan)	3	(1)

International career^{‡}
2022–2023	Scotland U17	5	(2)
2023–	Scotland U19	9	(3)
- * Club domestic league appearances and goals as of 17 October 2026 ‡ National team caps and goals as of 10:32, 10 September 2024 (UTC)

Rudi Allan Molotnikov (born 23 May 2006) is a Scottish professional footballer who plays as a midfielder for Scottish Championship side Arbroath on loan from Scottish Premiership club Hibernian, and has represented Scotland at the under-17 and under-19 levels.

== Club career ==
Molotnikov, a lifelong Hibernian fan from nearby Loanhead, began training with the club at around five years old and signed his first academy contract aged 10.

In July 2022, he signed a two-year professional contract with Hibernian. He travelled with the Hibernian first-team in July 2023 to their summer training camp, He featured during the pre-season friendlies, playing as a wide midfielder. He was named among the first-team match day substitutes on 27 July 2023, in the UEFA Europa Conference League against Inter Club d'Escaldes.

In August 2023 he signed a new three-year contract with the club. On 31 August 2023 he made his professional debut for Hibs, appearing as a second-half substitute against Aston Villa in the UEFA Europa Conference League. He was loaned to Stirling Albion in February 2024. At the start of the 2024/25 season, new manager David Gray gave Molotnikov some chances in the starting eleven, and on 16 July 2024 he scored his first professional goal in a 5-1 League Cup victory over Queen's Park. He signed a new four-year deal with Hibs on 30 December 2024, which is due to run until the summer of 2029.

On 11 September 2026, Molotnikov joined Scottish Championship side Arbroath on loan until January 2027.

== International career ==
In March 2023, he helped the Scotland U-17 team qualify for the 2023 UEFA European U-17 Championship. He was also subsequently then named in the Scotland U17 squad for the tournament.

== Personal life ==
Molotnikov grew up in Loanhead, Midlothian. His father is Justin Molotnikov, a Scottish-born television and film director with credits including Outlander, Poldark and Doctor Who.
