= Murray Aiken =

Scottish footballer (born 2004)

Personal information
- Date of birth: 5 August 2004 (age 22)
- Place of birth: Peebles, Scotland
- Positions: Right back; centre midfielder

Team information
- Current team: The Spartans F.C.
- Number: 8

Youth career
- 2015–2022: Hibernian

Senior career*
Years	Team	Apps	(Gls)
2022–2025	Hibernian	1	(0)
2023–2025	→ Airdrieonians (loan)	25	(1)
2025	→ Bonnyrigg Rose (loan)	11	(2)
2025–	The Spartans	20	(0)
- * Club domestic league appearances and goals as of 4 May 2026

Murray Aiken (born 5 August 2004) is a Scottish professional footballer who plays as a midfielder and right back who plays for The Spartans in Scottish League Two.

== Career ==
=== Hibernian ===
Aiken comes from Peebles. Having been with Hibs since the age of ten years-old, Aiken signed his first professional contract with the club in January 2021. He made his Scottish Premiership debut for Hibs on May 15, 2022 in a 4–0 win at home against St. Johnstone. In May 2023, he signed a new two-year contract with the club.

Aiken joined Airdrieonians on loan ahead of the 2023–24 season. He made his debut for Airdrieonians on 15 July 2023, in the Scottish League Cup against Dumbarton.

Aiken suffered an ankle injury against Dundee United at the end of October 2023, which kept him out the season until he returned against Queen's Park in the final game of the season.

He then returned to Airdrieonians, once again on loan, at the beginning of the 2024/25 season. He was released by Hibs in May 2025, at the end of his contract.
