= Rory Whittaker =

Scottish footballer

Personal information
- Date of birth: 10 August 2007 (age 19)
- Place of birth: Edinburgh, Scotland
- Height: 5 ft 10 in (1.78 m)
- Positions: Right back; right winger

Team information
- Current team: Southampton

Youth career
- –2018: The Spartans
- 2018–2023: Hibernian
- 2025–: Southampton

Senior career*
Years	Team	Apps	(Gls)
2023–2025	Hibernian	11	(0)
2024–2025	→ The Spartans (loan)	10	(0)
2025–	Southampton	0	(0)

International career^{‡}
2022	Scotland U16	2	(0)
2023	Scotland U17	1	(0)
2024–	Scotland U19	8	(0)
- * Club domestic league appearances and goals as of 11 June 2025 ‡ National team caps and goals as of 26 March 2024

Rory Whittaker (born 10 August 2007) is a Scottish professional footballer who plays as a right-back for EFL Championship club Southampton.

== Career ==
From Edinburgh, Whittaker came through the academy at Hibernian. He signed his first professional contract with the club in August 2023. He made his Scottish Premiership debut on 23 September 2023, as a second-half substitute for Hibernian against St Johnstone. At 16 years and 44 days old he set a record as the youngest ever player to appear for the club. Two days later he agreed a new three-year contract. He made his first league start on 8 November 2023.

On 9 August 2024, Whittaker returned to his childhood club Spartans on loan. The loan was cut short in January 2025, and in the second half of the 2024–25 season he helped the Hibs under-18 team win the CAS Elite Youth League.

On 16 August 2025, Whittaker joined Southampton on a three-year contract, initially joining the under-21s side.

== Career statistics ==
As of match played 2 November 2024

Appearances and goals by club, season and competition
Club	Season	League			Scottish Cup		Scottish League Cup		Continental		Other		Total	
Club	Season	Division	Apps	Goals	Apps	Goals	Apps	Goals	Apps	Goals	Apps	Goals	Apps	Goals
Hibernian B	2023–24	—			—		—		—		1 (Note: Appearance(s) in Scottish Challenge Cup)	0	1	0
Hibernian B	2024–25	—			—		—		—		1	0	1	0
Hibernian B	Total		—		—		—		—		2	0	2	0
Hibernian	2023–24	Scottish Premiership	11	0	1	0	2	0	0	0	—		14	0
Hibernian	2024–25	Scottish Premiership	0	0	0	0	0	0	—		—		0	0
Hibernian	Total		11	0	1	0	2	0	0	0	—		14	0
Spartans (loan)	2024–25	Scottish League Two	8	0	0	0	1	0	—		—		9	0
Southampton	2025–26	Championship	0	0	0	0	0	0	—		—		0	0
Southampton	2026–27	Championship	0	0	0	0	0	0	—		—		0	0
Southampton	Total		0	0	0	0	0	0	—		—		0	0
Career total			19	0	1	0	3	0	0	0	2	0	25	0
