= David Gray (footballer, born 1988) =

Scottish footballer

Personal information
- Full name: David Peter Gray
- Date of birth: 4 May 1988 (age 38)
- Place of birth: Edinburgh, Scotland
- Height: 5 ft 11 in (1.80 m)
- Position: Right-back

Youth career
- 2000–2004: Heart of Midlothian
- 2004–2006: Manchester United

Senior career*
Years	Team	Apps	(Gls)
2006–2010	Manchester United	0	(0)
2007	→ Royal Antwerp (loan)	1	(0)
2007	→ Crewe Alexandra (loan)	1	(0)
2009	→ Plymouth Argyle (loan)	14	(0)
2009	→ Plymouth Argyle (loan)	12	(0)
2010–2012	Preston North End	45	(0)
2012–2014	Stevenage	53	(0)
2014	Burton Albion	12	(0)
2014–2021	Hibernian	126	(7)
Total		264	(7)

International career
2006	Scotland U19	2	(0)
2008–2009	Scotland U21	2	(0)

Managerial career
- 2021: Hibernian (caretaker)
- 2022: Hibernian (caretaker)
- 2023: Hibernian (caretaker)
- 2024–2026: Hibernian
- * Club domestic league appearances and goals

David Peter Gray (born 4 May 1988) is a Scottish football coach and former player who was most recently the head coach of Scottish Premiership club Hibernian.

Gray progressed through Heart of Midlothian's youth system, before joining Manchester United for a fee of £50,000 in 2004. He spent six years at Manchester United, making one first-team appearance in a League Cup fixture in 2006. During his six-year tenure with the club, Gray was loaned on four occasions; spending time at Royal Antwerp, Crewe Alexandra, as well as two loan spells at Plymouth Argyle. Gray was released by Manchester United in 2010 and then signed for Preston North End. Gray spent two seasons at Preston, before being released at the end of the 2011–12 season.

He then had spells at Stevenage and Burton Albion before signing for Hibs in 2014. Prior to his second season at the club, Gray was given the captain's armband by Hibs manager Alan Stubbs, taking over from Liam Craig. Gray scored the winning goal in the 2016 Scottish Cup final for Hibs against Rangers, their first Scottish Cup win since 1902.

Gray represented Scotland at both under-19 and under-21 level.

He retired from playing in June 2021 and became a first-team coach at Hibs. After three stints as caretaker manager of Hibs, Gray was appointed head coach on a permanent basis in June 2024, early 2026–27 season he was sacked after poor results.

== Club career ==
=== Early career ===
Gray began his career in the Heart of Midlothian youth academy. He was selected for the Lothian Schools XI in 2002 while a pupil at Beeslack High School in Penicuik, along with other Hearts youngsters John Armstrong, Jason Thomson and Andrew Driver. Gray progressed through the youth ranks up until the age of 16, when he attracted the interest of Manchester United, and signed for the club for a fee of £50,000 in 2004. Gray was signed by the club as a winger, although Manchester United's coaching staff felt he was better suited as a full-back, and subsequently deployed him in the right-back position for the majority of the club's reserve games during the 2005–06 season. After impressing during his first full season in the reserve side, Gray made his first-team debut for Manchester United during the 2006–07 season, playing the first 77 minutes in the club's 2–1 victory over Crewe Alexandra in the League Cup in October 2006. It ultimately turned out to be Gray's only first-team appearance for the club. Three months after making his first-team debut, in January 2007, he was sent out on loan to Belgian club Royal Antwerp, to gain match experience. However, after just two games he suffered an injury, which ultimately sidelined him for the rest of the season, and he returned to his parent club in May 2007.

In November 2007, Gray was loaned to Crewe Alexandra on a one-month deal to provide cover for the club's injured players. He made one appearance during his brief loan spell, playing 80 minutes in Crewe's 2–0 away defeat to Nottingham Forest. He returned to Manchester United in December that year, and spent the remainder of the 2007–08 season playing for the reserve side. Gray was to enjoy his first spell of first-team football during the 2008–09 campaign, with the player signing for Championship side Plymouth Argyle on loan in January 2009 until the remainder of the season. He made his Plymouth debut in a 3–1 away defeat to Arsenal in the FA Cup two days after signing, and went on to make 15 appearances in all competitions during his loan spell. Gray rejoined Plymouth for a second loan spell in September 2009, featuring regularly once again, making 12 league appearances for the club before returning to Old Trafford in December 2009 at the end of his loan agreement. Although both Plymouth and Manchester United discussed Gray's move to Home Park being made permanent in January 2010, no transfer materialised and the player remained at Manchester United, captaining the reserve side on a number of occasions during the latter stages of the 2009–10 season.

=== Preston North End ===
Gray's Manchester United contract expired at the end of the 2009–10 season, and although he was offered a one-year contract extension with the club, he opted to join Preston North End on a two-year contract on 16 July 2010. Gray started the 2010–11 season as a regular in Darren Ferguson's side, making his debut in a 2–0 home loss to Doncaster Rovers on the first day of the campaign. He was ever-present during the first three months of the season, before suffering an injury in November 2010 that ultimately ruled him out of first-team action for three months. He returned to the first-team in a 1–0 away defeat to Hull City on 12 February 2011, although would suffer an even bigger injury setback a month later after breaking his leg in a 1–1 draw against Norwich City at Carrow Road. The injury ruled Gray out for the remainder of the season, as Preston were ultimately relegated to League One. During his first season with the club, he made 25 appearances in all competitions.

Ahead of the 2011–12 season, in June 2011, Gray was given permission by a specialist to begin training, just three months after he broke his leg. As expected, he missed the first month of the new campaign as a result of his delayed start to pre-season training, but eventually made his comeback appearance as a second-half substitute in a 2–1 defeat to Southampton in the League Cup on 21 September 2011. He went on to make 27 appearances for Preston during the season. Gray's contract at Preston expired at the end of the season, and he was released by the club in May 2012.

=== Stevenage ===
In June 2012, Gray signed for League One side Stevenage on a free transfer. He made his debut for the club on the opening day of the 2012–13 season, playing the whole match in a 3–1 home win against AFC Wimbledon in the League Cup. Gray played regularly at right-back throughout the season, making 46 appearances in all competitions. He was placed on the transfer list in May 2013. With Gray entering the final year of his contract at Stevenage, new manager Graham Westley felt he would not play as much as he would have liked, and therefore it was "better for all" that Gray "move on to develop his career".

=== Burton Albion ===
Gray signed for Burton Albion in January 2014 on a contract until the end of the 2013–14 season. He made 12 appearances in 2013–14 Football League Two for Burton.

=== Hibernian ===
Gray signed a two-year contract with Scottish Championship club Hibernian in July 2014. He scored his first ever professional goal on 29 September 2014, in a 3–1 win over Rangers. In total, Gray made 34 appearances and scored three goals for Hibs in the 2014–15 season. Gray was appointed captain at the end of the season, after the departure of Liam Craig, and also extended his contract until 2017. At the end of the season, Gray wrote himself into Hibernian folklore by becoming the captain of the first Hibs side to win the Scottish Cup in 114 years, scoring the stoppage-time winner against Rangers in the 2016 final.

Gray scored in a 3–0 win against Queen of the South on 15 April 2017, on the day when Hibernian clinched the Scottish Championship title, sealing promotion to the Scottish Premiership after a three-year absence. He signed a two-year contract with Hibs in May 2017. Gray suffered an achilles tendon injury during a friendly game against Willem II in January 2018, which meant that he did not make another first-team appearance in the 2017–18 season.

Gray returned to the Hibs first team in July 2018, and he scored five goals during the early part of the 2018–19 season. In April 2019, Hibs and Gray agreed a new contract that was due to run until 2023. Gray played infrequently for Hibs over the next two seasons, after which he retired from playing. He was granted a testimonial match, played against a Manchester United team on 15 October 2023.

== International career ==
Gray played for the Scotland schoolboys team in 2003 and represented the Scotland under-19 side on two occasions in 2006. In 2008, he was called up to the Scotland under-21 team to play in a friendly against Northern Ireland, making his debut during the match. In March 2009, Gray was called up for two 2011 UEFA European Under-21 Championship qualifiers later that month, although he was an unused substitute for both games. He was called up once again later that year, and was an unused substitute in a 1–0 defeat to Austria. A month later, he made his second appearance for the U21 side, playing 67 minutes of a 1–0 home victory against Belarus.

== Coaching career ==
Gray retired from playing in June 2021, and became a first-team coach at Hibs. Following the release of Jack Ross from the role of manager, Gray was appointed caretaker manager of Hibs on 9 December 2021. He held this position for three games, including a League Cup final defeat by Celtic, until the appointment of Shaun Maloney on 20 December. He again became caretaker manager in April 2022, August 2023 and May 2024 following the sackings of Maloney, Lee Johnson and Nick Montgomery respectively.

=== Hibernian manager ===
Following that fourth stint as caretaker manager, Gray was appointed head coach on a three-year contract in June 2024. Hibs had a bad start to the 2024–25 season and sat bottom of the table in late November, which led to speculation that he could be sacked. Gray changed their tactical formation to a back three system and the team then enjoyed a remarkable upturn in form, which resulted in Gray winning the manager of the month awards for December, February, and March. He signed a new contract with Hibs in April 2025, and in the following month they finished third in the league and qualified for European competition.

Gray again led Hibs to European competition by finishing fifth in 2025–26, but he was sacked in September 2026 after a run of home league defeats.

== Career statistics ==
As of 15 May 2021

=== Player ===
Club	Season	League			National Cup		League Cup		Other^{[A]}		Total	
Club	Season	Division	Apps	Goals	Apps	Goals	Apps	Goals	Apps	Goals	Apps	Goals
Manchester United	2006–07	Premier League	0	0	0	0	1	0	0	0	1	0
Manchester United	2007–08	Premier League	0	0	0	0	0	0	0	0	0	0
Manchester United	2008–09	Premier League	0	0	0	0	0	0	0	0	0	0
Manchester United	2009–10	Premier League	0	0	0	0	0	0	0	0	0	0
Manchester United	Total		0	0	0	0	1	0	0	0	1	0
Royal Antwerp (loan)	2006–07	Belgian Second Division	1	0	1	0	—		—		2	0
Crewe Alexandra (loan)	2007–08	League One	1	0	0	0	0	0	0	0	1	0
Plymouth Argyle (loan)	2008–09	Championship	14	0	1	0	0	0	0	0	15	0
Plymouth Argyle (loan)	2009–10	Championship	12	0	0	0	0	0	0	0	12	0
Plymouth Argyle (loan)	Total		26	0	1	0	0	0	0	0	27	0
Preston North End	2010–11	Championship	22	0	0	0	3	0	—		25	0
Preston North End	2011–12	League One	23	0	1	0	1	0	2	0	27	0
Preston North End	Total		45	0	1	0	4	0	2	0	52	0
Stevenage	2012–13	League One	42	0	1	0	2	0	1	0	46	0
Stevenage	2013–14	League One	11	0	0	0	1	0	0	0	12	0
Stevenage	Total		53	0	1	0	3	0	1	0	58	0
Burton Albion	2013–14	League Two	12	0	0	0	0	0	2	0	14	0
Hibernian	2014–15	Scottish Championship	25	2	3	1	3	0	3	0	34	3
Hibernian	2015–16	Scottish Championship	31	0	6	1	5	1	5	0	47	2
Hibernian	2016–17 (Note: Soccerbase did not record two appearances made (and a goal scored) by Gray against Brondby IF on 14 July and 21 July 2016.)	Scottish Championship	33	2	4	0	1	0	3	1	41	3
Hibernian	2017–18	Scottish Premiership	7	0	0	0	5	0	—		12	0
Hibernian	2018–19 (Note: Soccerbase did not record appearances made by Gray against NSI Runavik on 19 July, Asteras Tripolis on 26 July and 2 August, and Molde on 9 August and 16 August 2018.)	Scottish Premiership	24	3	2	0	1	1	5	2	32	6
Hibernian	2019–20	Scottish Premiership	4	0	1	0	1	0	—		6	0
Hibernian	2020–21	Scottish Premiership	2	0	0	0	3	1	—		5	1
Hibernian	Total		126	7	16	2	19	3	16	3	177	15
Career total			264	7	20	2	27	3	21	3	332	15

A. The "Other" column constitutes appearances and goals (including those as a substitute) in the Football League Trophy, Scottish Challenge Cup, UEFA Europa League and play-offs.

=== Managerial record ===
As of match played on 15 September 2026

Managerial record by team and tenure
Team	Nat	From	To	Record								Ref
Team	Nat	From	To	G	W	D	L	GF	GA	GD	Win %	Ref
Hibernian (caretaker)	(Scotland)	9 December 2021	20 December 2021	3	1	1	1	3	3	+0	33.33	—
Hibernian (caretaker)	(Scotland)	19 April 2022	19 May 2022	5	2	1	2	7	5	+2	40.00	—
Hibernian (caretaker)	(Scotland)	27 August 2023	11 September 2023	2	1	0	1	2	3	−1	50.00	—
Hibernian (Note: Gray was initially the caretaker manager in his fourth spell at Hibernian, until he was appointed on a three-year contract on 6 June 2024 BBC Sport.)	(Scotland)	14 May 2024	16 September 2026	109	44	30	35	174	134	+40	40.37	—
Total				119	48	32	39	186	142	+44	40.34	—

== Honours ==
=== Player ===
Hibernian

- Scottish Cup: 2015–16
- Scottish Championship: 2016–17

=== Manager ===
Hibernian

- Scottish League Cup: runner-up: 2021–22
