= 2022–23 Hibernian F.C. season =

Hibernian
2022–23 season
- Chairman: Ron Gordon (until 21 February); Malcolm McPherson (from 7 March)
- Manager: Lee Johnson
- Stadium: Easter Road; Leith, Edinburgh, Scotland (Capacity: 20,421)
- Premiership: 5th
- Scottish Cup: Fourth round
- League Cup: Group stage
- Top goalscorer: League: Kevin Nisbet (12); All: Kevin Nisbet (12)
- Highest home attendance: 20,179 (v. Heart of Midlothian, 7 August)
- Lowest home attendance: 13,930 (v. Ross County, 8 November)
- Average home league attendance: 17,470
| Home colours | Away colours | Third colours |

The 2022–23 season was Hibernian's sixth season of play back in the top flight of Scottish football, having been promoted from the Scottish Championship at the end of the 2016–17 season. Hibs were knocked out of the Scottish Cup in the fourth round and at the group stage of the League Cup.

Ron Gordon, who was the majority shareholder and executive chairman of Hibs, died from cancer in February 2023. He was succeeded as chairman by Malcolm McPherson, while Gordon's widow and children inherited the majority shareholding and took seats on the club board.

== Results and fixtures ==
Win Draw Loss Postponed

=== Friendlies ===
| 29 June 2022 Friendly | Hibernian | 2–0 | Hartlepool United | Alcantarilha e Pêra |
| 11:00 BST | Henderson 27'; Porteous 50' | Report | | Stadium: Amendoeira Golf Resort |

| 1 July 2022 Friendly | Hibernian | 4–2 | Burton Albion | Alcantarilha e Pêra |
| 11:00 BST | Youan 11'; Melkersen 47', 53'; Kenneh 81' | Report | Ahadme 5'; Gilligan 78' | Stadium: Amendoeira Golf Resort |

| 24 July 2022 Friendly | Hibernian | 1–0 | Norwich City | Edinburgh |
| 14:00 BST | Melkersen 39' | Report | | Stadium: Easter Road |

| 26 November 2022 Friendly | Hibernian | 0–2 | Middlesbrough | Edinburgh |
| 13:00 GMT | | Report | Akpom 62'; Finch 66' | Stadium: Easter Road |

| 8 December 2022 Friendly | Hibernian | 1–0 | Raith Rovers | Edinburgh |
| 12:00 GMT | Campbell | Report | | Stadium: Easter Road; Attendance: None |

| 8 December 2022 Friendly | Hibernian | A–A | Edinburgh | Edinburgh |
| 19:00 GMT | | | | Stadium: Easter Road |

=== Scottish Premiership ===
| 30 July 2022 1 | St Johnstone | 0–1 | Hibernian | Perth |
| 15:00 BST | | Report | Campbell 90' | Stadium: McDiarmid Park; Attendance: 5,793; Referee: Euan Anderson |

| 7 August 2022 2 | Hibernian | 1–1 | Heart of Midlothian | Edinburgh |
| 12:00 BST | Boyle 90+5' | Report | Shankland 22' | Stadium: Easter Road; Attendance: 20,179; Referee: John Beaton |

| 13 August 2022 3 | Livingston | 2–1 | Hibernian | Livingston |
| 15:00 BST | Nouble 6'; Obileye 86' | Report | Kenneh 50' | Stadium: Almondvale Stadium; Attendance: 3,854; Referee: Craig Napier |

| 20 August 2022 4 | Hibernian | 2–2 | Rangers | Edinburgh |
| 12:30 BST | Boyle 51'; Campbell 90+3' | Report | Tavernier 45' (pen.); Lawrence 58' | Stadium: Easter Road; Attendance: 18,245; Referee: William Collum |

| 27 August 2022 5 | St Mirren | 1–0 | Hibernian | Paisley |
| 15:00 BST | Baccus 6' | Report | | Stadium: St Mirren Park; Attendance: 5,343; Referee: Graham Grainger |

| 3 September 2022 6 | Hibernian | 1–0 | Kilmarnock | Edinburgh |
| 15:00 BST | Newell 12' | Report | | Stadium: Easter Road; Attendance: 15,426; Referee: John Beaton |

| 17 September 2022 7 | Hibernian | 3–1 | Aberdeen | Edinburgh |
| 15:00 BST | Boyle 45+1' (pen.); Campbell 62', 73' | Report | Lopes 4' | Stadium: Easter Road; Attendance: 17,292; Referee: David Dickinson |

| 1 October 2022 8 | Ross County | 0–2 | Hibernian | Dingwall |
| 15:00 BST | | Report | Porteous 46'; Boyle 80' | Stadium: Victoria Park; Attendance: 4,243; Referee: Alan Muir |

| 8 October 2022 9 | Hibernian | 1–0 | Motherwell | Edinburgh |
| 15:00 BST | Porteous 67' | Report | | Stadium: Easter Road; Attendance: 16,435; Referee: Grant Irvine |

| 11 October 2022 10 | Dundee United | 1–0 | Hibernian | Dundee |
| 19:45 BST | Behich 11' | Report | | Stadium: Tannadice Park; Attendance: 9,112; Referee: Euan Anderson |

| 15 October 2022 11 | Celtic | 6–1 | Hibernian | Glasgow |
| 15:00 BST | Forrest 9', 24', 58'; Giakoumakis 18', 73'; Maeda 89' | Report | Youan 56' | Stadium: Celtic Park; Attendance: 58,969; Referee: Steven McLean |

| 21 October 2022 12 | Hibernian | 1–2 | St Johnstone | Edinburgh |
| 19:30 BST | Kukharevych 35' | Report | Clark 73'; May 82' | Stadium: Easter Road; Attendance: 20,010; Referee: Kevin Clancy |

| 29 October 2022 13 | Hibernian | 3–0 | St Mirren | Edinburgh |
| 15:00 BST | Boyle 45+4' (pen.); Kukharevych 63'; Henderson 67' | Report | | Stadium: Easter Road; Attendance: 15,256; Referee: Don Robertson |

| 4 November 2022 14 | Aberdeen | 4–1 | Hibernian | Aberdeen |
| 19:30 GMT | Miovski 45+8' (pen.), 53'; Ramadani 61'; Clarkson 77' | Report | Kukharevych 69' | Stadium: Pittodrie Stadium; Attendance: 16,479; Referee: David Munro |

| 8 November 2022 15 | Hibernian | 0–2 | Ross County | Edinburgh |
| 19:45 GMT | | Report | Harmon 45+2'; Iacovitti 78' | Stadium: Easter Road; Attendance: 13,930; Referee: Alan Muir |

| 12 November 2022 16 | Kilmarnock | 1–0 | Hibernian | Kilmarnock |
| 15:00 GMT | Armstrong 53' (pen.) | Report | | Stadium: Rugby Park; Attendance: 6,391; Referee: David Dickinson |

| 15 December 2022 17 | Rangers | 3–2 | Hibernian | Glasgow |
| 20:00 GMT | Sakala 15'; Jack 58'; Morelos 62' | Report | Porteous 8'; Nisbet 16' | Stadium: Ibrox Stadium; Attendance: 48,671; Referee: Nick Walsh |

| 24 December 2022 18 | Hibernian | 4–0 | Livingston | Edinburgh |
| 14:00 GMT | Nisbet 33'; Cadden 35'; Magennis 40', 50' | Report | | Stadium: Easter Road; Attendance: 15,260; Referee: Craig Napier |

| 28 December 2022 19 | Hibernian | 0–4 | Celtic | Edinburgh |
| 20:00 GMT | | Report | Mooy 28', 58' (pen.); Maeda 36'; Furuhashi 64' | Stadium: Easter Road; Attendance: 19,730; Referee: Alan Muir |

| 2 January 2023 20 | Heart of Midlothian | 3–0 | Hibernian | Edinburgh |
| 15:00 GMT | Shankland 8', 38' (pen.); Humphrys 90+4' | Report | | Stadium: Tynecastle Park; Attendance: 18,980; Referee: Kevin Clancy |

| 8 January 2023 21 | Motherwell | 2–3 | Hibernian | Motherwell |
| 13:30 GMT | McKinstry 59'; Tierney 90+1' | Report | Nisbet 16', 52', 74' | Stadium: Fir Park; Attendance: 5,594; Referee: David Munro |

| 14 January 2023 22 | Hibernian | 2–2 | Dundee United | Edinburgh |
| 15:00 GMT | Nisbet 25', 90+2' | Report | Middleton 6'; Harkes 30' | Stadium: Easter Road; Attendance: 18,676; Referee: Colin Steven |

| 28 January 2023 23 | Hibernian | 6–0 | Aberdeen | Edinburgh |
| 15:00 GMT | Campbell 10', 15', 88' (pen.); Youan 45'; Nisbet 73'; Fish 90+1' | Report | | Stadium: Easter Road; Attendance: 16,671; Referee: Craig Napier |

| 31 January 2023 24 | Ross County | 1–1 | Hibernian | Dingwall |
| 19:45 GMT | Dhanda 73' | Report | Youan 31' | Stadium: Victoria Park; Attendance: 3,074; Referee: Graham Grainger |

| 4 February 2023 25 | St Mirren | 0–1 | Hibernian | Paisley |
| 15:00 GMT | | Report | Youan 77' | Stadium: St Mirren Park; Attendance: 7,253; Referee: Matthew MacDermid |

| 18 February 2023 26 | Hibernian | 2–0 | Kilmarnock | Edinburgh |
| 15:00 GMT | Fish 16'; Hoppe 47' | Report | | Stadium: Easter Road; Attendance: 16,068; Referee: John Beaton |

| 4 March 2023 27 | Livingston | 1–4 | Hibernian | Livingston |
| 15:00 GMT | Nouble 9' | Report | Youan 28', 37'; Oméonga 61' (o.g.); Kukharevych 90+7' | Stadium: Almondvale Stadium; Attendance: 5,531; Referee: Chris Graham |

| 8 March 2023 28 | Hibernian | 1–4 | Rangers | Edinburgh |
| 19:45 GMT | Goldson 8' (o.g.) | Report | Tavernier 12' (pen.); Colak 34', 58'; Sakala 52' | Stadium: Easter Road; Attendance: 19,341; Referee: Don Robertson |

| 18 March 2023 29 | Celtic | 3–1 | Hibernian | Glasgow |
| 15:00 GMT | Jota 52' (pen.); Oh 81'; Hakšabanović 90+5' | Report | Campbell 39' (pen.) | Stadium: Celtic Park; Attendance: 59,156; Referee: Steven McLean |

| 1 April 2023 30 | Hibernian | 1–3 | Motherwell | Edinburgh |
| 15:00 BST | Nisbet 62' | Report | Goss 7' van Veen 54' (pen.), 81' | Stadium: Easter Road; Attendance: 16,598; Referee: Graham Grainger |

| 9 April 2023 31 | Dundee United | 2–1 | Hibernian | Dundee |
| 12:00 BST | Fletcher 8'; McGrath 90' (pen.) | Report | Kukharevych 70' | Stadium: Tannadice Park; Attendance: 9,516; Referee: David Munro |

| 15 April 2023 32 | Hibernian | 1–0 | Heart of Midlothian | Edinburgh |
| 12:30 BST | Nisbet 67' | Report | | Stadium: Easter Road; Attendance: 20,132; Referee: John Beaton |

| 22 April 2023 33 | St Johnstone | 1–1 | Hibernian | Perth |
| 15:00 BST | May 25' | Report | Stevenson 32' | Stadium: McDiarmid Park; Attendance: 6,787; Referee: Craig Napier |

| 6 May 2023 34 | Hibernian | 2–1 | St Mirren | Edinburgh |
| 15:00 BST | Youan 4'; Fish 23' | Report | Greive 64' | Stadium: Easter Road; Attendance: 16,334; Referee: Matthew MacDermid |

| 13 May 2023 35 | Aberdeen | 0–0 | Hibernian | Aberdeen |
| 15:00 BST | | Report | | Stadium: Pittodrie Stadium; Attendance: 18,620; Referee: Nick Walsh |

| 21 May 2023 36 | Hibernian | 1–3 | Rangers | Edinburgh |
| 12:00 BST | Hanlon 90+3' | Report | Tavernier 32'; Hagi 55'; Cantwell 86' | Stadium: Easter Road; Attendance: 18,172; Referee: Alan Muir |

| 24 May 2023 37 | Hibernian | 4–2 | Celtic | Edinburgh |
| 19:45 BST | Youan 52', 80'; Nisbet 75' (pen.); Bernabei 86' (o.g.) | Report | Hatate 41' (pen.); Oh 58' | Stadium: Easter Road; Attendance: 18,171; Referee: Kevin Clancy |

| 27 May 2023 38 | Heart of Midlothian | 1–1 | Hibernian | Edinburgh |
| 12:30 BST | Oda 8' | Report | Nisbet 31' | Stadium: Tynecastle Park; Attendance: 18,971; Referee: Don Robertson |

=== Scottish Cup ===
| 22 January 2023 Fourth round | Hibernian | 0–3 | Heart of Midlothian | Edinburgh |
| 14:00 GMT | | Report | Ginnelly 10'; Shankland 72'; Sibbick 90+6' | Stadium: Easter Road; Attendance: 18,622; Referee: Don Robertson |

=== Scottish League Cup ===
Hibs entered the 2022–23 Scottish League Cup at the group stage, and were drawn in Group D along with Morton, Falkirk, Clyde and SPFL newcomers Bonnyrigg Rose. A defeat by Falkirk and a penalty shootout loss against Morton left Hibs on the brink of elimination at the group stage. Their elimination was confirmed when it transpired that Hibs had fielded a player who was under suspension (Rocky Bushiri) against Morton, which meant that they forfeited the match.

==== Group stage ====
| 9 July 2022 1 | Hibernian | 5–0 | Clyde | Edinburgh |
| 15:00 BST | Doidge 16', 28', 29'; Melkersen 23'; Campbell 42' | Report | | Stadium: Easter Road; Attendance: 6,334; Referee: Craig Napier |

| 12 July 2022 2 | Falkirk | 1–0 | Hibernian | Falkirk |
| 19:45 BST | Nesbitt 39' | Report | | Stadium: Falkirk Stadium; Attendance: 3,918; Referee: Kevin Clancy |

| 17 July 2022 3 | Bonnyrigg Rose Athletic | 1–4 | Hibernian | Bonnyrigg |
| 15:00 BST | Smith 45+5' | Report | Newell 2', 45+6'; Henderson 45+4', 90+3' | Stadium: New Dundas Park; Attendance: 2,400; Referee: Steven McLean |

| 20 July 2022 4 | Hibernian | Awarded; 0–3; ~~1–1~~ (~~1–3~~ p) | Greenock Morton | Edinburgh |
| 19:45 BST | ~~Henderson 71'~~ | Report | ~~Gillespie 61' (pen.)~~ | Stadium: Easter Road; Attendance: 5,177; Referee: Euan Anderson |

== Player statistics ==
As of match played on 27 May 2023

| No. | Pos | Player | Premiership | | Scottish Cup | | League Cup | | Total | |
| No. | Pos | Player | Apps | Goals | Apps | Goals | Apps | Goals | Apps | Goals |
Goalkeepers
| 1 | GK | (Scotland) David Marshall | 38 | 0 | 1 | 0 | 3 | 0 | 42 | 0 |
| 21 | GK | (Poland) Kevin Dąbrowski | 0 | 0 | 0 | 0 | 1 | 0 | 1 | 0 |
Defenders
| 2 | DF | (Australia) Lewis Miller | 12 | 0 | 0 | 0 | 4 | 0 | 16 | 0 |
| 3 | DF | (Croatia) Marijan Čabraja | 25 | 0 | 1 | 0 | 0 | 0 | 26 | 0 |
| 4 | DF | (Scotland) Paul Hanlon | 34 | 1 | 1 | 0 | 0 | 0 | 35 | 1 |
| 5 | DF | (Scotland) Ryan Porteous | 21 | 3 | 1 | 0 | 4 | 0 | 26 | 3 |
| 12 | DF | (Scotland) Chris Cadden | 37 | 1 | 1 | 0 | 4 | 0 | 42 | 1 |
| 16 | DF | (Scotland) Lewis Stevenson | 28 | 1 | 1 | 0 | 3 | 0 | 32 | 1 |
| 17 | DF | (Scotland) Mikey Devlin | 1 | 0 | 0 | 0 | 0 | 0 | 1 | 0 |
| 25 | DF | (England) Will Fish | 21 | 3 | 0 | 0 | 0 | 0 | 21 | 3 |
| 26 | DF | (England) CJ Egan-Riley | 14 | 0 | 0 | 0 | 0 | 0 | 14 | 0 |
| 33 | DF | (Belgium) Rocky Bushiri | 15 | 0 | 1 | 0 | 4 | 0 | 20 | 0 |
| 34 | DF | (Northern Ireland) Kyle McClelland | 1 | 0 | 0 | 0 | 3 | 0 | 4 | 0 |
| 37 | DF | (Scotland) Oscar MacIntyre | 2 | 0 | 0 | 0 | 0 | 0 | 2 | 0 |
| 41 | DF | (Scotland) Jacob Blaney | 0 | 0 | 0 | 0 | 1 | 0 | 1 | 0 |
Midfielders
| 6 | MF | (England) Nohan Kenneh | 15 | 1 | 0 | 0 | 4 | 0 | 19 | 1 |
| 7 | MF | (Scotland) Kyle Magennis | 13 | 2 | 0 | 0 | 0 | 0 | 13 | 2 |
| 8 | MF | (Republic of Ireland) Jake Doyle-Hayes | 17 | 0 | 0 | 0 | 2 | 0 | 19 | 0 |
| 11 | MF | (England) Joe Newell | 34 | 1 | 0 | 0 | 4 | 2 | 38 | 3 |
| 14 | MF | (Australia) James Jeggo | 16 | 0 | 1 | 0 | 0 | 0 | 17 | 0 |
| 18 | MF | (Scotland) Ewan Henderson | 30 | 1 | 1 | 0 | 4 | 3 | 35 | 4 |
| 19 | MF | (England) Demetri Mitchell | 3 | 0 | 0 | 0 | 0 | 0 | 3 | 0 |
| 28 | MF | (Scotland) Dylan Tait | 0 | 0 | 0 | 0 | 1 | 0 | 1 | 0 |
| 30 | MF | (Norway) Runar Hauge | 0 | 0 | 0 | 0 | 1 | 0 | 1 | 0 |
| 32 | MF | (Scotland) Josh Campbell | 36 | 8 | 1 | 0 | 4 | 1 | 41 | 9 |
| 36 | MF | (Belgium) Allan Delferrière | 1 | 0 | 0 | 0 | 0 | 0 | 1 | 0 |
| 46 | MF | (Republic of Ireland) Aiden McGeady | 9 | 0 | 1 | 0 | 4 | 0 | 14 | 0 |
Forwards
| 9 | FW | (Wales) Christian Doidge | 5 | 0 | 0 | 0 | 4 | 3 | 9 | 3 |
| 10 | FW | (Portugal) Jair Tavares | 8 | 0 | 0 | 0 | 1 | 0 | 9 | 0 |
| 13 | FW | (United States) Matthew Hoppe | 9 | 1 | 0 | 0 | 0 | 0 | 9 | 1 |
| 15 | FW | (Scotland) Kevin Nisbet | 19 | 12 | 1 | 0 | 0 | 0 | 20 | 12 |
| 17 | FW | (The Gambia) Momodou Bojang | 5 | 0 | 0 | 0 | 2 | 0 | 7 | 0 |
| 20 | FW | (Norway) Elias Melkersen | 13 | 0 | 0 | 0 | 4 | 1 | 17 | 1 |
| 22 | FW | (England) Harry McKirdy | 22 | 0 | 1 | 0 | 0 | 0 | 23 | 0 |
| 23 | FW | (France) Élie Youan | 36 | 9 | 1 | 0 | 0 | 0 | 37 | 9 |
| 39 | FW | (Scotland) Josh O’Connor | 2 | 0 | 0 | 0 | 0 | 0 | 2 | 0 |
| 77 | FW | (Australia) Martin Boyle | 12 | 5 | 0 | 0 | 0 | 0 | 12 | 5 |
| 99 | FW | (Ukraine) Mykola Kukharevych | 15 | 5 | 0 | 0 | 0 | 0 | 15 | 5 |

== Club statistics ==
=== League table ===
| Pos | Team | Pld | W | D | L | GF | GA | GD | Pts | Qualification or relegation (Note: Teams play each other three times (33 matches), before the league is split into two groups (the top six and the bottom six).) |
|---|---|---|---|---|---|---|---|---|---|---|
| 3 | Aberdeen | 38 | 18 | 3 | 17 | 56 | 60 | −4 | 57 | Qualification for the Europa League play-off round |
| 4 | Heart of Midlothian | 38 | 15 | 9 | 14 | 63 | 57 | +6 | 54 | Qualification for the Europa Conference League third qualifying round |
| 5 | Hibernian | 38 | 15 | 7 | 16 | 57 | 59 | −2 | 52 | Qualification for the Europa Conference League second qualifying round |
| 6 | St Mirren | 38 | 12 | 10 | 16 | 43 | 61 | −18 | 46 | |
| 7 | Motherwell | 38 | 14 | 8 | 16 | 53 | 51 | +2 | 50 | |

Rules for classification: 1) Points; 2) Goal difference; 3) Goals scored; 4) Head-to-Head points; 5) Head-to-Head goal difference; 6) Play-off (only if deciding champion, UEFA competitions qualification, second stage group allocation or relegation).

=== League Cup table ===
| Pos | Team | Pld | W | PW | PL | L | GF | GA | GD | Pts | Qualification | FAL | GMO | HIB | BON | CLY |
|---|---|---|---|---|---|---|---|---|---|---|---|---|---|---|---|---|
| 1 | Falkirk | 4 | 2 | 2 | 0 | 0 | 3 | 1 | +2 | 10 | Qualification for the second round | — | — | 1–0 | — | 1–0 |
| 2 | Greenock Morton | 4 | 2 | 0 | 1 | 1 | 6 | 3 | +3 | 7 | | 0–0p | — | — | 3–1 | — |
| 3 | Hibernian | 4 | 2 | 0 | 0 | 2 | 9 | 5 | +4 | 6 | | — | 0–3 (Note: Greenock Morton were awarded a technical 3−0 win over Hibernian, who fielded an ineligible player. The match had originally finished 1–1, with Greenock Morton securing the bonus point following a 3–1 win on penalties.) | — | — | 5–0 |
| 4 | Bonnyrigg Rose | 4 | 1 | 0 | 1 | 2 | 5 | 9 | −4 | 4 | | 1–1p | — | 1–4 | — | — |
| 5 | Clyde | 4 | 1 | 0 | 0 | 3 | 3 | 8 | −5 | 3 | | — | 2–0 | — | 1–2 | — |

Rules for classification: 1) goal difference, 2) goals scored, 3) away goals scored, 4) matches won, 5) away matches won, 6) drawing of lots.

=== Management statistics ===
As of match played on 27 May 2023

| Name | P | W | D | L | Win% (Note: Win% is the percentage of matches won rounded to two decimal places.) |
|---|---|---|---|---|---|
| (England) Lee Johnson | 43 | 17 | 7 | 19 | 39.53 |

== Transfers ==
=== Players in ===
| Player | From | Fee |
|---|---|---|
| (Scotland) Ewan Henderson | (Scotland) Celtic | Free |
| (Scotland) David Marshall | (England) Queens Park Rangers | Free |
| (Liberia) Nohan Kenneh | (England) Leeds United | Free |
| (Democratic Republic of the Congo) Rocky Bushiri | (England) Norwich City | Undisclosed |
| (Australia) Lewis Miller | (Australia) Central Coast Mariners | Undisclosed |
| (Portugal) Jair Tavares | (Portugal) Benfica | Undisclosed |
| (Northern Ireland) Kyle McClelland | (Scotland) Rangers | Free |
| (Republic of Ireland) Aiden McGeady | (England) Sunderland | Free |
| (Scotland) Reuben McAllister | (England) Bristol City | Undisclosed |
| (Croatia) Marijan Čabraja | (Croatia) Dinamo Zagreb | Undisclosed |
| (Australia) Martin Boyle | (Saudi Arabia) Al Faisaly | Undisclosed |
| (England) Harry McKirdy | (England) Swindon Town | Undisclosed |
| (Australia) James Jeggo | (Belgium) K.A.S. Eupen | Free |
| (Scotland) Mikey Devlin | (England) Fleetwood Town | Free |

=== Players out ===
| Player | To | Fee |
|---|---|---|
| (Scotland) Scott Allan | (Scotland) Arbroath | Free |
| (Cyprus) Alex Gogić | (Scotland) St Mirren | Free |
| (Scotland) Sean Mackie | (Scotland) Falkirk | Free |
| (Scotland) Innes Murray | (Scotland) Edinburgh | Free |
| (Scotland) Jamie Murphy | (Scotland) St Johnstone | Free |
| (England) Drey Wright | (Scotland) St Johnstone | Free |
| (England) Matt Macey | (England) Luton Town | Undisclosed |
| (Scotland) Paul McGinn | (Scotland) Motherwell | Free |
| (Scotland) David Mitchell | (Scotland) Partick Thistle | Free |
| (Scotland) Connor Young | (Scotland) Rangers | Undisclosed |
| (Scotland) Josh Doig | (Italy) Hellas Verona | £3,000,000 |
| (Scotland) Steven Bradley | (Scotland) Livingston | Undisclosed |
| (Portugal) Joaõ Baldé | (Scotland) Arbroath | Free |
| (Scotland) Jack Brydon | (Scotland) Queen of the South | Free |
| (England) Demetri Mitchell | (England) Exeter City | Free |
| (Scotland) Ryan Porteous | (England) Watford | £450,000 |

=== Loans in ===
| Player | From |
|---|---|
| (The Gambia) Momodou Bojang | (The Gambia) Rainbow FC (Gambia) |
| (France) Élie Youan | (Switzerland) FC St. Gallen |
| (England) Ryan Schofield | (England) Huddersfield Town |
| (England) Will Fish | (England) Manchester United |
| (Ukraine) Mykola Kukharevych | (France) Troyes |
| (England) CJ Egan-Riley | (England) Burnley |
| (United States) Matthew Hoppe | (England) Middlesbrough |

=== Loans out ===
| Player | To |
|---|---|
| (Scotland) Daniel MacKay | (Scotland) Inverness CT |
| (Scotland) Jack Brydon | (Scotland) Edinburgh |
| (Norway) Runar Hauge | (Republic of Ireland) Dundalk |
| (United States) EJ Johnson | (Scotland) Edinburgh |
| (Scotland) Murray Johnson | (Scotland) Airdrieonians |
| (Belgium) Allan Delferrière | (Scotland) Edinburgh |
| (Portugal) Joaõ Baldé | (Scotland) East Fife |
| (Wales) Christian Doidge | (Scotland) Kilmarnock |
| (Scotland) Dylan Tait | (Scotland) Arbroath |
| (Northern Ireland) Kyle McClelland | (Scotland) Cove Rangers |
| (Poland) Kevin Dąbrowski | (Scotland) Queen of the South |
| (Liberia) Nohan Kenneh | (Scotland) Ross County |
| (Norway) Elias Melkersen | (Netherlands) Sparta Rotterdam |
| (United States) EJ Johnson | (United States) Austin FC |
| (Scotland) Robbie Hamilton | (Scotland) Stirling Albion |
| (Scotland) Jacob Blaney | (Scotland) Stenhousemuir |
| (Scotland) Josh McCulloch | (Scotland) Albion Rovers |
| (England) Kanayo Megwa | (Scotland) Kelty Hearts |

== See also ==
- List of Hibernian F.C. seasons
