= Miguel Tavares =

Miguel Tavares may refer to:

- Miguel Tavares (volleyball) (born 1993), Portuguese volleyball player
- Miguel Tavares (footballer, born 1998), Portuguese footballer
- Miguel Tavares (footballer, born 1999), Portuguese footballer
