= Cláudio Tavares =

Cláudio Tavares may refer to:

- Cláudio Tavares (rower) (born 1964), Brazilian rower
- Cláudio Tavares (footballer) (born 1997), Cape Verdean footballer
