= Jair Tavares =

Portuguese footballer (born 2001)

Personal information
- Full name: Jair Veiga Vieira Tavares
- Date of birth: 13 February 2001 (age 25)
- Height: 1.77 m (5 ft 10 in)
- Position: Winger

Team information
- Current team: AEL Limassol
- Number: 80

Youth career
- 2010–2022: Benfica

Senior career*
Years	Team	Apps	(Gls)
2020–2022	Benfica B	37	(4)
2022–2025	Hibernian	34	(2)
2024–2025	→ Motherwell (loan)	9	(0)
2025	Kauno Žalgiris	7	(1)
2026–	AEL Limassol	9	(2)

International career^{‡}
2016–2017	Portugal U16	12	(2)
2017–2018	Portugal U17	14	(1)
2018–2019	Portugal U18	7	(3)
2019	Portugal U19	7	(1)
- * Club domestic league appearances and goals as of 7 November 2026 ‡ National team caps and goals as of 3 November 2025 (UTC)

Jair Veiga Vieira Tavares (born 13 February 2001) is a Portuguese professional footballer who plays as a winger for Cypriot First Division club AEL Limassol.

== Career ==
Tavares came through the Benfica youth system, and played for their B team during the 2020–21 and 2021–22 seasons.

On 15 June 2022 Tavares joined Scottish club Hibernian for an undisclosed fee on a contract until the summer of 2026. Tavares made limited appearances under the management of Lee Johnson, but he became a first team regular following the appointment of Nick Montgomery.

On 30 August 2024, Tavares joined Motherwell on loan until the end of the 2024–25 season. He was released from his contract with Hibs in June 2025.

On 22 August 2025, Tavares joined Kauno Žalgiris. On 15 August 2025 he made his debut in A Lyga against FK Riteriai. FK Kauno Žalgiris won 6-1. On 2 November 2025 he scored first goal in A Lyga against FK Panevėžys and FK Kauno Žalgiris won 3–2. On 1 February 2026 officially announced that Jair Tavares left Kauno Žalgiris Club.

On 3 June 2026, Tavares joined AEL Limassol.

== Personal life ==
Born in Portugal, Tavares is of Cape Verdean descent. He hails from a footballing family, with both of his brothers, Cláudio and Miguel, as well as cousin Renato Sanches, all being professional footballers.

== Career statistics ==
=== Club ===
As of match played on 5 April 2025

Club	Season	League			National cup (Note: Includes Scottish Cup)		League cup (Note: Includes Scottish League Cup)		Other		Total	
Club	Season	Division	Apps	Goals	Apps	Goals	Apps	Goals	Apps	Goals	Apps	Goals
Benfica B	2020–21	LigaPro	13	0	—		—		—		13	0
Benfica B	2021–22	LigaPro	24	4	—		—		—		24	4
Benfica B	Total		37	4	—		—		—		37	4
Hibernian	2022–23	Scottish Premiership	8	0	0	0	1	0	—		9	0
Hibernian	2023–24	Scottish Premiership	26	2	2	0	1	0	—		29	2
Hibernian	Total		34	2	2	0	2	0	—		38	2
Motherwell (loan)	2024–25	Scottish Premiership	8	0	0	0	4	0	—		12	0
Career totals			79	6	2	0	6	0	—		87	6

== Honours ==
FK Kauno Žalgiris

- A Lyga: 2025
