= 2022–23 Scottish League Cup group stage =

2022–23 Scottish League Cup (group stage)
Tournament details
- Country: Scotland
- Dates: 9 July 2022 – 24 July 2022
- Teams: 40

Tournament statistics
- Matches played: 80
- Goals scored: 249 (3.11 per match)
- Top goal scorer(s): 4 players (4 goals)

The 2022–23 Scottish League Cup group stage was played from 9 July to 24 July 2022. A total of 40 teams competed in the group stage. The winners of each of the eight groups, as well as the three best runners-up progressed to the second round (last 16) of the 2022–23 Scottish League Cup.

== Format ==
The format for the 2022–23 competition was similar to the previous six seasons, however, unlike previous seasons, the group stage was not regionalised. The competition began with eight groups of five teams. The five clubs competing in the UEFA Champions League (Celtic and Rangers), Europa League (Heart of Midlothian) and Europa Conference League (Dundee United and Motherwell) qualifying rounds received a bye to the second round. The group stage consisted of 40 teams: all remaining teams that competed across the SPFL in 2021–22, and the 2021–22 Highland Football League champions (Fraserburgh) and runners-up (Buckie Thistle), and the 2021–22 Lowland Football League champions (Bonnyrigg Rose Athletic).

The winners of each of the eight groups, as well as the three best runners-up, progressed to the second round (last 16). At this stage, the competition reverted to the traditional knock-out format. The three group winners with the highest points total and the European entrants were seeded.

The traditional point system of awarding three points for a win and one point for a draw was used, however, for each group stage match that finished in a draw, a penalty shoot-out took place, with the winner being awarded a bonus point.

The draw for the group stage took place on 25 May 2022 and was broadcast live on FreeSports & the SPFL YouTube channel.

== Teams ==
The teams were seeded according to their final league positions in 2021–22 and drawn into eight groups, with each group comprising one team from each pot.

=== Seeding ===
Teams in Bold qualified for the second round.

Pot 1	Pot 2	Pot 3	Pot 4	Pot 5
01. **Ross County**; 02. **Livingston**; 03. Hibernian; 04. St Mirren; 05. **Aberdeen**; 06. St Johnstone; 07. **Dundee**; 08. **Kilmarnock**	09. **Arbroath**; 10. **Inverness Caledonian Thistle**; 11. **Partick Thistle**; 12. Raith Rovers; 13. Hamilton Academical; 14. Greenock Morton; 15. Ayr United; 16. Dunfermline Athletic	17. **Queen of the South**; 18. Cove Rangers; 19. Airdrieonians; 20. Montrose; 21. Queen's Park; 22. Alloa Athletic; 23. **Falkirk**; 24. Peterhead	25. Clyde; 26. Dumbarton; 27. East Fife; 28. Kelty Hearts; 29. Forfar Athletic; 30. **Annan Athletic**; 31. Edinburgh; 32. Stenhousemuir	33. Stranraer; 34. Stirling Albion; 35. Albion Rovers; 36. Elgin City; 37. Cowdenbeath; 38. Bonnyrigg Rose; 39. Fraserburgh; 40. Buckie Thistle

== Group stage ==
All times are BST (UTC +1).

=== Group A ===
Pos	Team	Pld	W	PW	PL	L	GF	GA	GD	Pts	Qualification	ABE	STI	RAI	DUM	PET
1	Aberdeen	4	4	0	0	0	12	0	+12	12	Qualification for the second round	—	—	3–0	2–0	—
2	Stirling Albion	4	2	1	0	1	6	7	−1	8		0–5	—	—	—	3–0
3	Raith Rovers	4	1	1	1	1	7	4	+3	6		—	1–1p	—	—	6–0
4	Dumbarton	4	1	0	1	2	3	4	−1	4		—	1–2	0–0p	—	—
5	Peterhead	4	0	0	0	4	0	13	−13	0		0–2	—	—	0–2	—

Rules for classification: 1) goal difference, 2) goals scored, 3) away goals scored, 4) matches won, 5) away matches won, 6) drawing of lots.

==== Matches ====
9 July 2022
15:00

Dumbarton	1–2	Stirling Albion
MacLean 86'		Thomson 54'; Moore 68'

Dumbarton Football Stadium, Dumbarton
Attendance: 309
Referee: Greg Soutar
10 July 2022
15:00

Peterhead	0–2	Aberdeen
		Ramirez 63' (pen.), 74'

Balmoor Stadium, Peterhead
Attendance: 3,112
Referee: David Dickinson
13 July 2022
19:45

Aberdeen	2–0	Dumbarton
McCrorie 36'; Kennedy 57'

Pittodrie Stadium, Aberdeen
Attendance: 7,189
Referee: Colin Steven
13 July 2022
19:45

Raith Rovers	6–0	Peterhead
Easton 16', 32', 51'; Dick 62'; Gullan 65'; Connolly 89'

Stark's Park, Kirkcaldy
Attendance: 1,031
Referee: Calum Scott
16 July 2022
15:00

Peterhead	0–2	Dumbarton
		Gray 23'; Buchanan 71'

Balmoor Stadium, Peterhead
Attendance: 351
Referee: Barry Cook
16 July 2022
15:00

Raith Rovers	1–1	Stirling Albion
Connolly 21'		Moore 44'
Penalties
Gullan (penalty scored); Dick (penalty scored); Mahady (penalty scored); Coulson (penalty missed); Easton (penalty scored); Brown (penalty missed)	4–5	(penalty missed) Thomson; (penalty scored) Cummins; (penalty scored) Clark; (penalty scored) Burns; (penalty scored) Moore; (penalty scored) Banner

Stark's Park, Kirkcaldy
Attendance: 960
Referee: Lloyd Wilson
19 July 2022
19:45

Dumbarton	0–0	Raith Rovers
Penalties
Buchanan (penalty missed); Byrne (penalty missed); McKee (penalty scored); Love (penalty scored); Carswell (penalty missed)	2–3	(penalty missed) Gullan; (penalty scored) Berra; (penalty scored) Millen; (penalty missed) Dick; (penalty scored) Easton

Dumbarton Football Stadium, Dumbarton
Attendance: 276
Referee: Graham Grainger
19 July 2022
19:45

Stirling Albion	0–5	Aberdeen
		Besuijen 11', 43'; Ramirez 24'; Kennedy 31'; McCrorie 41'

Forthbank Stadium, Stirling
Attendance: 2,017
Referee: Craig Napier
23 July 2022
15:00

Stirling Albion	3–0	Peterhead
Carrick 5', 72', 89'

Forthbank Stadium, Stirling
Attendance: 302
Referee: Ross Hardie
24 July 2022
15:00

Aberdeen	3–0	Raith Rovers
Miovski 6' (pen.); McCrorie 39'; Hayes 46'

Pittodrie Stadium, Aberdeen
Attendance: 8,785
Referee: David Munro

=== Group B ===
Pos	Team	Pld	W	PW	PL	L	GF	GA	GD	Pts	Qualification	PAR	KIL	STE	MON	FRA
1	Partick Thistle	4	3	1	0	0	9	4	+5	11	Qualification for the second round	—	—	—	4–2	2–0
2	Kilmarnock	4	3	0	1	0	11	3	+8	10	Qualification for the second round	1–1p	—	4–1	—	—
3	Stenhousemuir	4	2	0	0	2	7	6	+1	6		1–2	—	—	—	3–0
4	Montrose	4	1	0	0	3	6	11	−5	3		—	0–3	0–2	—	—
5	Fraserburgh	4	0	0	0	4	3	12	−9	0		—	1–3	—	2–4	—

Rules for classification: 1) goal difference, 2) goals scored, 3) away goals scored, 4) matches won, 5) away matches won, 6) drawing of lots.

==== Matches ====
9 July 2022
15:00

Fraserburgh	1–3	Kilmarnock
Butcher 69'		Shaw 6'; Murray 17'; Lafferty 70'

Bellslea Park, Fraserburgh
Attendance: 1,022
Referee: Graham Grainger
9 July 2022
15:00

Stenhousemuir	1–2	Partick Thistle
Yates 63'		Turner 54'; Graham 75'

Ochilview Park, Stenhousemuir
Attendance: 926
Referee: Calum Scott
12 July 2022
19:45

Fraserburgh	2–4	Montrose
Butcher 66', 90'		Lyons 11', 16', 30'; Webster 90'

Bellslea Park, Fraserburgh
Attendance: 466
Referee: Chris Fordyce
13 July 2022
19:45

Kilmarnock	1–1	Partick Thistle
Donnelly 12'		Muirhead 44'
Penalties
Shaw (penalty scored); Polworth (penalty scored); McInroy (penalty scored); F.Murray (penalty missed); Taylor (penalty scored)	4–5	(penalty scored) Muirhead; (penalty scored) Holt; (penalty scored) Graham; (penalty scored) Docherty; (penalty scored) Turner

Rugby Park, Kilmarnock
Attendance: 3,012
Referee: Nick Walsh
16 July 2022
15:00

Montrose	0–3	Kilmarnock
		McInroy 37'; Armstrong 69'; Shaw 90'

Links Park, Montrose
Attendance: 901
Referee: Grant Irvine
16 July 2022
15:00

Stenhousemuir	3–0	Fraserburgh
Sewell 25'; Bryson 52'; Yates 75'

Ochilview Park, Stenhousemuir
Attendance: 301
Referee: Daniel Graves
19 July 2022
19:45

Montrose	0–2	Stenhousemuir
		O'Reilly 70', 80'

Links Park, Montrose
Attendance: 372
Referee: Alan Newlands
19 July 2022
19:45

Partick Thistle	2–0	Fraserburgh
Hay 33' (o.g.); Graham 62'

Firhill Stadium, Glasgow
Attendance: 1,344
Referee: Scott Lambie
23 July 2022
15:00

Kilmarnock	4–1	Stenhousemuir
Polworth 5'; Shaw 33' (pen.), 79'; Armstrong 54'		Yates 23'

Rugby Park, Kilmarnock
Attendance: 2,429
Referee: Greg Aitken
23 July 2022
15:00

Partick Thistle	4–2	Montrose
McMillan 17'; Holt 45+1'; Fitzpatrick 66'; Mullen 81'		Brown 55'; Johnston 85'

Firhill Stadium, Glasgow
Attendance: 1,578
Referee: Dunacn Williams

=== Group C ===
Pos	Team	Pld	W	PW	PL	L	GF	GA	GD	Pts	Qualification	ROS	DNF	ALL	EFI	BUC
1	Ross County	4	3	1	0	0	11	1	+10	11	Qualification for the second round	—	1–0	—	7–0	—
2	Dunfermline Athletic	4	2	0	1	1	8	2	+6	7		—	—	1–1p	—	5–0
3	Alloa Athletic	4	1	2	0	1	6	5	+1	7		0–2	—	—	p1–1	—
4	East Fife	4	1	0	1	2	4	12	−8	4		—	0–2	—	—	3–2
5	Buckie Thistle	4	0	0	1	3	4	13	−9	1		1–1p	—	1–4	—	—

Rules for classification: 1) goal difference, 2) goals scored, 3) away goals scored, 4) matches won, 5) away matches won, 6) drawing of lots.

==== Matches ====
9 July 2022
15:00

Buckie Thistle	1–1	Ross County
Urquhart 53'		D. Samuel 61'
Penalties
Goodall (penalty missed); Barry (penalty scored); Murray (penalty scored); Pugh (penalty scored)	3–5	(penalty scored) Hiwula; (penalty scored) Olaigbe; (penalty scored) D. Samuel; (penalty scored) Cancola; (penalty scored) Callachan

Victoria Park, Buckie
Attendance: 554
Referee: Chris Graham
9 July 2022
15:00

East Fife	0–2	Dunfermline Athletic
		McCann 67', 83' (pen.)

Bayview Stadium, Methil
Attendance: 963
Referee: Iain Snedden
12 July 2022
19:45

Alloa Athletic	1–1	East Fife
Steele 12' (o.g.)		Shepherd 71'
Penalties
Taggart (penalty scored); Scougall (penalty scored); Graham (penalty missed); King (penalty scored); Sammon (penalty scored); O'Donnell (penalty scored); Stanger (penalty scored)	6–5	(penalty scored) Mercer; (penalty scored) Healy; (penalty scored) Cunningham; (penalty missed) Murdoch; (penalty scored) Newton; (penalty scored) Walls; (penalty missed) Slattery

Recreation Park, Alloa
Attendance: 272
Referee: Barry Cook
12 July 2022
19:45

Dunfermline Athletic	5–0	Buckie Thistle
Breen 20'; McCann 51'; Todorov 62', 78'; Edwards 82'

East End Park, Dunfermline
Attendance: 1,530
Referee: Dan McFarlane
16 July 2022
15:00

Buckie Thistle	1–4	Alloa Athletic
Urquhart 16' (pen.)		Sammon 23', 81', 86'; Rodden 27'

Victoria Park, Buckie
Attendance: 390
Referee: Duncan Williams
16 July 2022
15:00

Ross County	1–0	Dunfermline Athletic
Hiwula 64'

Victoria Park, Dingwall
Attendance: 943
Referee: Nick Walsh
19 July 2022
19:45

Alloa Athletic	0–2	Ross County
		Sims 18'; Hiwula 90'

Recreation Park, Alloa
Attendance: 351
Referee: Chris Graham
19 July 2022
19:45

East Fife	3–2	Buckie Thistle
Shepherd 52'; Mercer 54', 79'		Adams 22', 36'

Bayview Stadium, Methil
Attendance: 231
Referee: Chris Fordyce
23 July 2022
15:00

Dunfermline Athletic	1–1	Alloa Athletic
Hamilton 20'		Sammon 59'
Penalties
McCann (penalty scored); O'Hara (penalty scored); Todorov (penalty scored); Chalmers (penalty missed); Allan (penalty scored)	4–5	(penalty scored) Taggart; (penalty scored) Scougall; (penalty scored) Sammon; (penalty scored) King; (penalty scored) MacIver

East End Park, Dunfermline
Attendance: 1,723
Referee: Scott Lambie
23 July 2022
15:00

Ross County	7–0	East Fife
Loturi 26'; Purrington 37'; Hiwula 46'; Edwards 48', 53'; Olaigbe 59', 66'

Victoria Park, Dingwall
Attendance: 726
Referee: Mike Roncone

=== Group D ===
Pos	Team	Pld	W	PW	PL	L	GF	GA	GD	Pts	Qualification	FAL	GMO	HIB	BON	CLY
1	Falkirk	4	2	2	0	0	3	1	+2	10	Qualification for the second round	—	—	1–0	—	1–0
2	Greenock Morton	4	2	0	1	1	6	3	+3	7		0–0p	—	—	3–1	—
3	Hibernian	4	2	0	0	2	9	5	+4	6		—	0–3 (Note: Greenock Morton were awarded a technical 3−0 win over Hibernian, who fielded an ineligible player. The match had originally finished 1–1, with Greenock Morton securing the bonus point following a 3–1 win on penalties.)	—	—	5–0
4	Bonnyrigg Rose	4	1	0	1	2	5	9	−4	4		1–1p	—	1–4	—	—
5	Clyde	4	1	0	0	3	3	8	−5	3		—	2–0	—	1–2	—

Rules for classification: 1) goal difference, 2) goals scored, 3) away goals scored, 4) matches won, 5) away matches won, 6) drawing of lots.

==== Matches ====
9 July 2022
15:00

Hibernian	5–0	Clyde
Doidge 16', 28', 29'; Melkersen 23'; Campbell 42'

Easter Road, Edinburgh
Attendance: 6,334
Referee: Craig Napier
9 July 2022
15:00

Greenock Morton	0–0	Falkirk
Penalties
Blues (penalty scored); Lyon (penalty scored); King (penalty scored); Pignatiello (penalty scored); Kabia (penalty missed)	4–5	(penalty scored) McGuffie; (penalty scored) Hetherington; (penalty scored) C. Morrison; (penalty scored) McGinn; (penalty scored) McKay

Cappielow, Greenock
Attendance: 1,405
Referee: Colin Steven
12 July 2022
19:45

Falkirk	1–0	Hibernian
Nesbitt 39'

Falkirk Stadium, Falkirk
Attendance: 3,918
Referee: Kevin Clancy
13 July 2022
19:45

Clyde	1–2	Bonnyrigg Rose
Cunningham 45'		McGachie 20'; Hall 28'

New Douglas Park, Hamilton
Attendance: 344
Referee: Iain Snedden
16 July 2022
15:00

Clyde	2–0	Greenock Morton
McDonald 37'; Cunningham 83' (pen.)

New Douglas Park, Hamilton
Attendance: 435
Referee: Scott Lambie
17 July 2022
15:00

Bonnyrigg Rose	1–4	Hibernian
Smith 45'		Newell 2', 45'; Henderson 45', 90'

New Dundas Park, Bonnyrigg
Attendance: 2,400
Referee: Steven McLean
20 July 2022
19:45

Bonnyrigg Rose	1–1	Falkirk
Turner 42' (pen.)		Morrison 9'
Penalties
Brett (penalty scored); Martyniuk (penalty scored); Hunter (penalty missed); Smith (penalty missed)	2–4	(penalty scored) McGuffie; (penalty missed) Morrison; (penalty scored) Yeats; (penalty scored) McGinn; (penalty scored) Oliver

New Dundas Park, Bonnyrigg
Attendance: 1,507
Referee: Ross Hardie
20 July 2022
19:45

Hibernian	0–3 (awarded)	Greenock Morton
Henderson 71'		Gillespie 61' (pen.)

Easter Road, Edinburgh
Attendance: 5,177
Referee: Euan Anderson
23 July 2022
15:00

Falkirk	1–0	Clyde
McGuffie 21'

Falkirk Stadium, Falkirk
Attendance: 1,911
Referee: Barry Cook
23 July 2022
15:00

Greenock Morton	3–1	Bonnyrigg Rose
Kabia 15'; Pignatiello 19'; Gillespie 61' (pen.)		K. Smith 9'

Cappielow, Greenock
Attendance: 995
Referee: Calum Scott

Notes

1. A: Greenock Morton were awarded a technical 3−0 win over Hibernian, who fielded an ineligible player. The match had originally finished 1–1, with Greenock Morton securing the bonus point following a 3–1 win on penalties.

=== Group E ===
Pos	Team	Pld	W	PW	PL	L	GF	GA	GD	Pts	Qualification	ARB	AIR	STM	EDI	COW
1	Arbroath	4	4	0	0	0	10	1	+9	12	Qualification for the second round	—	3–0	—	—	3–0
2	Airdrieonians	4	2	0	1	1	6	4	+2	7		—	—	2–0	1–1p	—
3	St Mirren	4	2	0	0	2	5	4	+1	6		0–1	—	—	3–1	—
4	Edinburgh	4	1	1	0	2	6	7	−1	5		1–3	—	—	—	3–0
5	Cowdenbeath	4	0	0	0	4	0	11	−11	0		—	0–3	0–2	—	—

Rules for classification: 1) goal difference, 2) goals scored, 3) away goals scored, 4) matches won, 5) away matches won, 6) drawing of lots.

==== Matches ====
9 July 2022
15:00

Cowdenbeath	0–3	Airdrieonians
		Devenny 39'; Ballantyne 43'; Frizzell 60'

Central Park, Cowdenbeath
Attendance: 345
Referee: Lloyd Wilson
9 July 2022
15:00

St Mirren	0–1	Arbroath
		Paterson 90+3'

St Mirren Park, Paisley
Attendance: 1,923
Referee: Kevin Clancy
12 July 2022
19:45

Airdrieonians	1–1	Edinburgh
Devenny 26'		Robertson 20'
Penalties
Fordyce (penalty scored); McCabe (penalty missed); Smith (penalty scored); Frizzell (penalty missed)	2–4	(penalty scored) Handling; (penalty scored) Shanley; (penalty scored) Docherty; (penalty scored) Robertson

Excelsior Stadium, Airdrie
Attendance: 515
Referee: Ross Hardie
13 July 2022
19:45

Arbroath	3–0	Cowdenbeath
Paterson 18'; Hamilton 41'; Donnelly 60'

Gayfield Park, Arbroath
Attendance: 900
Referee: Peter Stuart
16 July 2022
15:00

Cowdenbeath	0–2	St Mirren
		Ayunga 19', 23'

Central Park, Cowdenbeath
Attendance: 638
Referee: Craig Napier
16 July 2022
15:00

Edinburgh	1–3	Arbroath
Crane 24'		Low 39'; Linn 75', 81'

Meadowbank Stadium, Edinburgh
Attendance: 499
Referee: Gavin Duncan
19 July 2022
19:45

Airdrieonians	2–0	St Mirren
Devenny 66'; Gunn 90'

Excelsior Stadium, Airdrie
Attendance: 1,127
Referee: Alan Muir
20 July 2022
19:45

Edinburgh	3–0	Cowdenbeath
Robertson 13' (pen.), 35'; Shanley 53'

Meadowbank Stadium, Edinburgh
Attendance: 308
Referee: Iain Snedden
23 July 2022
15:00

Arbroath	3–0	Airdrieonians
McKenna 12'; Shanks 48'; Thomson 60'

Gayfield Park, Arbroath
Attendance: 1,170
Referee: David Dickinson
23 July 2022
15:00

St Mirren	3–1	Edinburgh
O'Hara 8' (pen.); Ayunga 25', 46'		Handling 53'

St Mirren Park, Paisley
Attendance: 1,047
Referee: Craig Napier

=== Group F ===
Pos	Team	Pld	W	PW	PL	L	GF	GA	GD	Pts	Qualification	ANN	QOS	STJ	AYR	ELG
1	Annan Athletic	4	2	2	0	0	8	3	+5	10	Qualification for the second round	—	—	—	p1–1	4–0
2	Queen of the South	4	2	1	0	1	9	5	+4	8	Qualification for the second round	2–3	—	p2–2	—	—
3	St Johnstone	4	2	0	2	0	7	4	+3	8		0–0p	—	—	1–0	—
4	Ayr United	4	1	0	1	2	4	5	−1	4		—	0–3	—	—	3–0 (Note: Ayr United were awarded a technical 3−0 win over Elgin City, who fielded an ineligible player. The match had originally finished 0–0, with Ayr United securing the bonus point following a 4–3 win on penalties.)
5	Elgin City	4	0	0	0	4	2	13	−11	0		—	0–2	2–4	—	—

Rules for classification: 1) goal difference, 2) goals scored, 3) away goals scored, 4) matches won, 5) away matches won, 6) drawing of lots.

==== Matches ====
9 July 2022
15:00

Ayr United	3–0 (awarded)	Elgin City

Somerset Park, Ayr
Attendance: 1,194
Referee: David Munro
9 July 2022
15:00

Queen of the South	2–3	Annan Athletic
Murray 8'; Paton 50'		Currie 27' (o.g.); Johnston 33'; Hunter 87'

Palmerston Park, Dumfries
Attendance: 1,222
Referee: Chris Fordyce
12 July 2022
19:45

Ayr United	0–3	Queen of the South
		Connelly 8'; Murray 60'; Todd 82'

Somerset Park, Ayr
Attendance: 1,352
Referee: Duncan Williams
12 July 2022
19:45

St Johnstone	0–0	Annan Athletic
Penalties
Murphy (penalty scored); May (penalty scored); Davidson (penalty scored); O'Halloran (penalty missed); Carey (penalty scored); Considine (penalty missed)	4–5	(penalty scored) Goss; (penalty missed) Hooper; (penalty scored) Smith; (penalty scored) Docherty; (penalty scored) Wallace; (penalty scored) Galloway

McDiarmid Park, Perth
Attendance: 2,036
Referee: Don Robertson
16 July 2022
15:00

Annan Athletic	4–0	Elgin City
Smith 15' (pen.), 38'; Goss 20', 88'

Galabank, Annan
Attendance: 286
Referee: Iain Snedden
16 July 2022
15:00

Queen of the South	2–2	St Johnstone
Connelly 12'; Paton 64'		Murphy 49', 84'
Penalties
Wilson (penalty scored); P.McKay (penalty scored); Todd (penalty scored); McGrory (penalty scored)	4–2	(penalty scored) Murphy; (penalty scored) Hallberg; (penalty missed) Davidson; (penalty missed) Kucheriavyi

Palmerston Park, Dumfries
Attendance: 1,027
Referee: Graham Grainger
19 July 2022
19:45

Annan Athletic	1–1	Ayr United
Wallace 90' (pen.)		Bryden 71'
Penalties
Muir (penalty scored); Hunter (penalty scored); Williamson (penalty scored); Galloway (penalty missed); Wallace (penalty missed); Fleming (penalty scored); Barnes (penalty scored)	5–4	(penalty missed) Murdoch; (penalty scored) Akinyemi; (penalty scored) McGinty; (penalty scored) Bryden; (penalty missed) Reading; (penalty scored) Dempsey; (penalty missed) McKenzie

Galabank, Annan
Attendance: 528
Referee: Lloyd Wilson
19 July 2022
19:45

Elgin City	2–4	St Johnstone
Dingwall 74'; Hester 85'		Montgomery 11'; Hallberg 49'; May 62'; Ballantyne 70'

Borough Briggs, Elgin
Attendance: 886
Referee: Greg Aitken
23 July 2022
15:00

Elgin City	0–2	Queen of the South
		McKechnie 50'; Paton 54'

Borough Briggs, Elgin
Attendance: 566
Referee: Steven Kirkland
23 July 2022
15:00

St Johnstone	1–0	Ayr United
Carey 2'

McDiarmid Park, Perth
Attendance: 2,036
Referee: Gavin Duncan

Notes

1. B: Ayr United were awarded a technical 3−0 win over Elgin City, who fielded an ineligible player. The match had originally finished 0–0, with Ayr United securing the bonus point following a 4–3 win on penalties.

=== Group G ===
Pos	Team	Pld	W	PW	PL	L	GF	GA	GD	Pts	Qualification	ICT	LIV	COV	ALB	KEL
1	Inverness Caledonian Thistle	4	3	1	0	0	8	2	+6	11	Qualification for the second round	—	—	p1–1	4–0	—
2	Livingston	4	3	0	0	1	8	5	+3	9	Qualification for the second round	1–2	—	—	—	2–0
3	Cove Rangers	4	1	0	1	2	6	7	−1	4		—	1–2	—	—	2–3
4	Albion Rovers	4	1	0	0	3	5	9	−4	3		—	2–3	1–2	—	—
5	Kelty Hearts	4	1	0	0	3	3	7	−4	3		0–1	—	—	0–2	—

Rules for classification: 1) goal difference, 2) goals scored, 3) away goals scored, 4) matches won, 5) away matches won, 6) drawing of lots.

==== Matches ====
9 July 2022
15:00

Albion Rovers	2–3	Livingston
Sonkur 62'; Paton 71'		Pittman 5'; Mullin 20'; Anderson 48'

Cliftonhill, Coatbridge
Attendance: 468
Referee: Don Robertson
9 July 2022
15:00

Kelty Hearts	0–1	Inverness Caledonian Thistle
		Oakley 89'

New Central Park, Kelty
Attendance: 601
Referee: Barry Cook
12 July 2022
19:45

Albion Rovers	1–2	Cove Rangers
Reynolds 31' (o.g.)		Leitch 43'; Scully 67'

Cliftonhill, Coatbridge
Attendance: 268
Referee: Stewart Luke
12 July 2022
19:45

Livingston	1–2	Inverness Caledonian Thistle
Holt 84'		Samuels 37'; MacKay 67'

Almondvale Stadium, Livingston
Attendance: 944
Referee: Alan Muir
16 July 2022
15:00

Cove Rangers	1–2	Livingston
Vigurs 45'		Shinnie 48'; Devlin 88'

Balmoral Stadium, Aberdeen
Attendance: 797
Referee: Willie Collum
16 July 2022
15:00

Kelty Hearts	0–2	Albion Rovers
		Sonkur 81'; Reilly 85' (pen.)

New Central Park, Kelty
Attendance: 402
Referee: David Dickinson
19 July 2022
19:45

Cove Rangers	2–3	Kelty Hearts
Fyvie 29'; Leitch 87'		Agyeman 16'; McNab 23'; Austin 71'

Balmoral Stadium, Aberdeen
Attendance: 486
Referee: Duncan Williams
19 July 2022
19:45

Inverness Caledonian Thistle	4–0	Albion Rovers
McKay 2'; Harper 41', 53'; Duffy 46'

Caledonian Stadium, Inverness
Attendance: 871
Referee: Gavin Duncan
23 July 2022
15:00

Inverness Caledonian Thistle	1–1	Cove Rangers
MacGregor 13'		Megginson 19'
Penalties
Boyd (penalty scored); Samuels (penalty scored); Harper (penalty scored); McKay (penalty scored); Allardice (penalty scored)	5–3	(penalty scored) Megginson; (penalty scored) Leitch; (penalty missed) Fyvie; (penalty scored) Logan

Caledonian Stadium, Inverness
Attendance: 1,020
Referee: Alan Newlands
23 July 2022
15:00

Livingston	2–0	Kelty Hearts
Kelly 11' (pen.); Cancar 77'

Almondvale Stadium, Livingston
Attendance: 712
Referee: Grant Irvine

=== Group H ===
Pos	Team	Pld	W	PW	PL	L	GF	GA	GD	Pts	Qualification	DND	HAM	QPA	FOR	STR
1	Dundee	4	4	0	0	0	13	2	+11	12	Qualification for the second round	—	3–0	—	5–1	—
2	Hamilton Academical	4	2	1	0	1	9	6	+3	8		—	—	p1–1	—	5–2
3	Queen's Park	4	2	0	1	1	11	6	+5	7		1–2	—	—	4–1	—
4	Forfar Athletic	4	1	0	0	3	5	12	−7	3		—	0–3	—	—	3–0 (Note: Forfar Athletic were awarded a technical 3−0 win over Stranraer, who fielded an ineligible player. The match had originally finished 2–2, with Forfar Athletic securing the bonus point following a 5–3 win on penalties.)
5	Stranraer	4	0	0	0	4	4	16	−12	0		0–3	—	2–5	—	—

Rules for classification: 1) goal difference, 2) goals scored, 3) away goals scored, 4) matches won, 5) away matches won, 6) drawing of lots.

==== Matches ====
9 July 2022
15:00

Dundee	3–0	Hamilton Academical
McGinn 25'; Jakubiak 48' (pen.); Cameron 90+1'

Dens Park, Dundee
Attendance: 1,760
Referee: Gavin Duncan
9 July 2022
15:00

Stranraer	2–5	Queen's Park
Robertson 43'; McLean 45+3'		Murray 9', 28', 45+4'; Savoury 41', 90+2'

Stair Park, Stranraer
Attendance: 215
Referee: Alan Muir
12 July 2022
19:45

Hamilton Academical	5–2	Stranraer
Winter 49'; Ryan 51'; Shiels 53', 55'; L.Smith 78'		Woods 68' (pen.), 88' (pen.)

New Douglas Park, Hamilton
Attendance: 447
Referee: Graham Grainger
12 July 2022
19:45

Queen's Park	4–1	Forfar Athletic
Kilday 40', 90'; Williamson 69'; Moore 84'		McCluskey 47'

Ochilview Park, Stenhousemuir
Attendance: 220
Referee: Scott Lambie
16 July 2022
15:00

Forfar Athletic	0–3	Hamilton Academical
		Shiels 45'; Ryan 50'; Winter 65'

Station Park, Forfar, Forfar
Attendance: 409
Referee: Alex Shepherd
16 July 2022
15:00

Stranraer	0–3	Dundee
		Kerr 43'; McGowan 73'; McCowan 83'

Stair Park, Stranraer
Attendance: 497
Referee: Greg Aitken
19 July 2022
19:45

Forfar Athletic	3–0 (awarded)	Stranraer
Ellis 29' (o.g.); Jack 76'		Hilton 48'; McLean 86' (pen.)

Station Park, Forfar
Attendance: 244
Referee: Dan McFarlane
19 July 2022
19:45

Queen's Park	1–2	Dundee
Longridge 52'		Jakubiak 31'; Kerr 36'

Ochilview Park, Stenhousemuir
Attendance: 570
Referee: Willie Collum
23 July 2022
15:00

Dundee	5–1	Forfar Athletic
Jakubiak 21', 24'; McGinn 38'; French 45'; Cameron 66'		McCluskey 68'

Dens Park, Dundee
Attendance: 1,854
Referee: Graham Grainger
23 July 2022
15:00

Hamilton Academical	1–1	Queen's Park
Winter 4'		Davidson 78'
Penalties
Lawson (penalty scored); Shiels (penalty scored); O'Reilly (penalty scored); Ryan (penalty scored); Ngandu (penalty scored)	5–3	(penalty scored) Brown; (penalty scored) Savoury; (penalty missed) Davidson; (penalty scored) Murray

New Douglas Park, Hamilton
Attendance: 786
Referee: Don Robertson

Notes

1. C: Forfar Athletic were awarded a technical 3−0 win over Stranraer, who fielded an ineligible player. The match had originally finished 2–2, with Forfar Athletic securing the bonus point following a 5–3 win on penalties.

== Best runners-up ==
Pos	Grp	Team	Pld	W	PW	PL	L	GF	GA	GD	Pts	Qualification
1	B	Kilmarnock	4	3	0	1	0	11	3	+8	10	Qualification for the second round
2	G	Livingston	4	3	0	0	1	8	5	+3	9	Qualification for the second round
3	F	Queen of the South	4	2	1	0	1	9	5	+4	8	Qualification for the second round
4	H	Hamilton Academical	4	2	1	0	1	9	6	+3	8	
5	A	Stirling Albion	4	2	1	0	1	6	7	−1	8	
6	C	Dunfermline Athletic	4	2	0	1	1	8	2	+6	7	
7	D	Greenock Morton	4	2	0	1	1	6	3	+3	7	
8	E	Airdrieonians	4	2	0	1	1	6	4	+2	7	

Rules for classification: 1) goal difference, 2) goals scored, 3) away goals scored, 4) matches won, 5) away matches won, 6) drawing of lots.

== Qualified teams ==
Team	Qualified as	Qualified on	Notes
Annan Athletic	Group F winner	19 July 2022	
Partick Thistle	Group B winner	23 July 2022	
Ross County	Group C winner	23 July 2022	
Falkirk	Group D winner	23 July 2022	
Arbroath	Group E winner	23 July 2022	Seeded for second round draw
Inverness Caledonian Thistle	Group G winner	23 July 2022	
Dundee	Group H winner	23 July 2022	Seeded for second round draw
Kilmarnock	Best runner-up	23 July 2022	
Livingston	Best runner-up	23 July 2022	
Aberdeen	Group A winner	24 July 2022	Seeded for second round draw
Queen of the South	Best runner-up	24 July 2022	

== Top goalscorers ==
As of 24 July 2022

Rank	Player	Club	Goals
1	(Republic of Ireland) Conor Sammon	Alloa Athletic	4
1	(Scotland) Alex Jakubiak	Dundee	4
1	(Scotland) Oli Shaw	Kilmarnock	4
1	(Kenya) Jonah Ayunga	St Mirren	4
5	17 players		3
