= Renato Sanches =

Portuguese footballer (born 1997)

Renato Sanches ComM
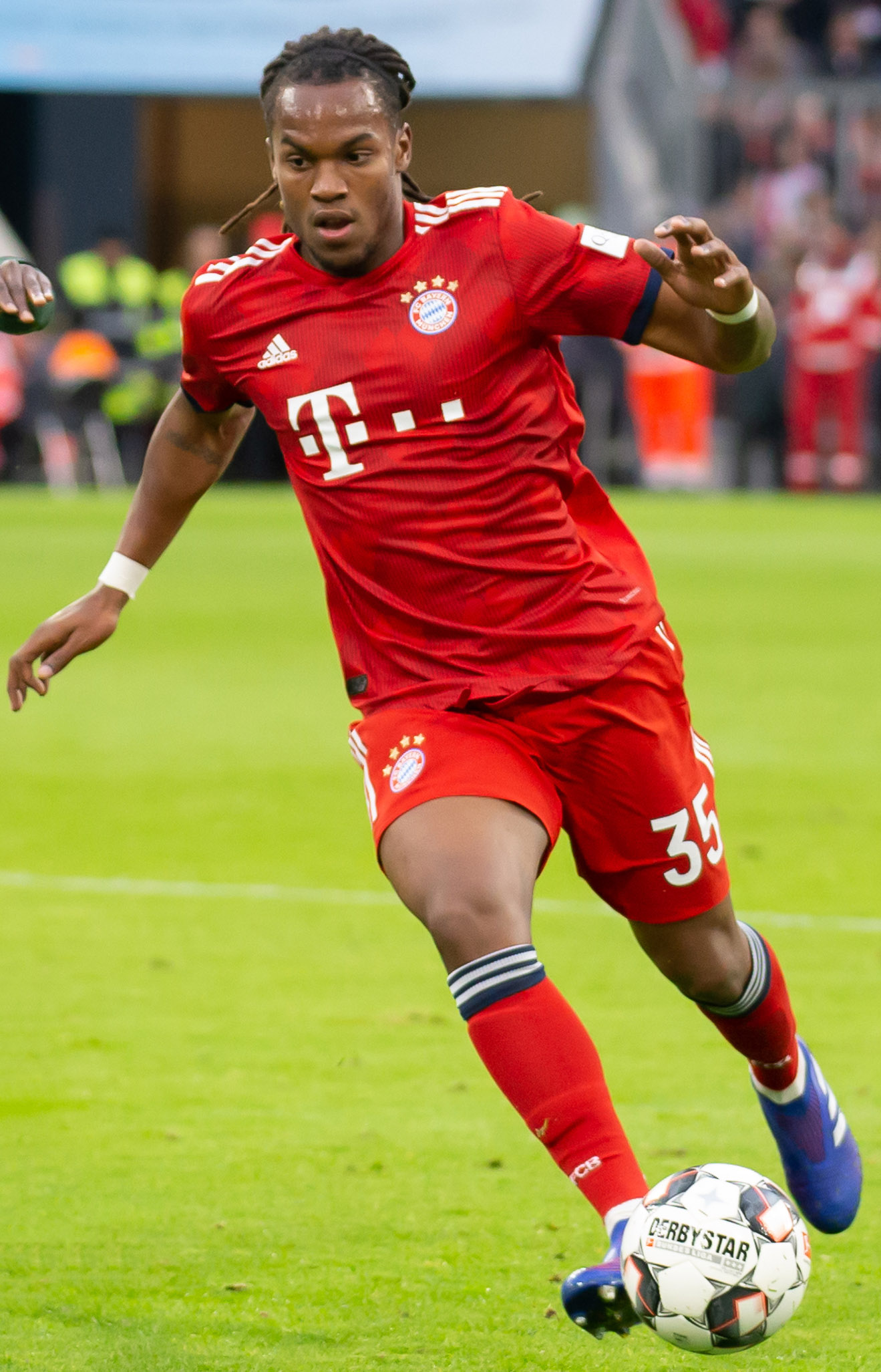
- Sanches playing for Bayern Munich in 2019

Personal information
- Full name: Renato Júnior Luz Sanches
- Date of birth: 18 August 1997 (age 29)
- Place of birth: Amadora, Portugal
- Height: 1.76 m (5 ft 9 in)
- Position: Midfielder

Youth career
- 2005–2006: Águias da Musgueira
- 2006–2015: Benfica

Senior career*
Years	Team	Apps	(Gls)
2014–2015	Benfica B	34	(3)
2015–2016	Benfica	24	(2)
2016–2019	Bayern Munich	35	(1)
2017–2018	→ Swansea City (loan)	12	(0)
2019–2022	Lille	67	(6)
2022–2026	Paris Saint-Germain	23	(2)
2023–2024	→ Roma (loan)	7	(1)
2024–2025	→ Benfica (loan)	10	(0)
2025–2026	→ Panathinaikos (loan)	14	(1)

International career
2012	Portugal U15	2	(0)
2012–2013	Portugal U16	7	(1)
2013–2014	Portugal U17	19	(4)
2014–2015	Portugal U19	12	(3)
2017	Portugal U21	4	(0)
2016–2021	Portugal	32	(3)
Medal record
Men's football
Representing Portugal
UEFA European Championship
Winner	2016 France
- * Club domestic league appearances and goals as of 17 May 2026

Renato Júnior Luz Sanches ComM (Portuguese pronunciation: [ʁɨˈnatu ˈsɐ̃ʃɨʃ]; born 18 August 1997) is a Portuguese professional footballer who plays as a midfielder.

Sanches began his career at Benfica, making his professional debut for the reserves in October 2014 and for the first team in October 2015. In his first and only season with them, he helped Benfica win the Primeira Liga and Taça da Liga double, being awarded Primeira Liga Breakthrough Player and Golden Boy in the process.

Sanches' performances then attracted German side Bayern Munich, who signed him in July 2016 for an initial €35 million, the highest fee at the time for a Portuguese player playing in the Primeira Liga. His performances fell during his first season with the club, leading him to be loaned to Premier League side Swansea City in August 2017. After remaining as a substitute, following his return to Bayern in 2018, he was signed by French Ligue 1 side Lille in August 2019 for a reported fee of €25 million, becoming Lille's most expensive signing ever. In his second season at the club, he helped the team win the 2020–21 Ligue 1, which ended the club's 10-year league title drought. In 2022, he was transferred to Ligue 1 rivals Paris Saint-Germain for €10 million. After a season, he was loaned to Italian club Roma. He returned to Benfica on loan in 2024.

Sanches won 40 caps and scored 8 goals for Portugal at youth level. He made his full international debut in March 2016 and was chosen for UEFA Euro 2016 at age 18, making him the youngest Portuguese to play in an international tournament as well as the youngest player to win a UEFA Euro final. He scored one goal during the competition and won the Young Player of the Tournament as Portugal captured the title for the first time in their history.

== Early life ==
Sanches was born in the Hospital Amadora-Sintra in the Lisbon metropolitan area, to a father also named Renato Sanches, from São Tomé and Príncipe, and a mother named Maria das Dores, from Cape Verde. Nicknamed Bulo by his grandmother, he grew up in the impoverished Lisbon neighbourhood of Musgueira. His parents split up months after his birth, and his father moved to work in France; Sanches' birth was not registered until his father returned in 2002 and the parents had him baptised. He was registered on 22 August 2002 with the birthdate of 3:25 p.m. on 18 August 1997.

Sanches started training in football at Águias da Musgueira at age eight, and joined Benfica's youth system in 2006 at age nine. The team paid €750 and 25 footballs for his signature. He convinced Benfica to take him after training with them for 15 minutes, but he initially had reservations about travelling to their academy in Seixal every day, on the other side of the Tagus river.

== Club career ==
=== Benfica ===
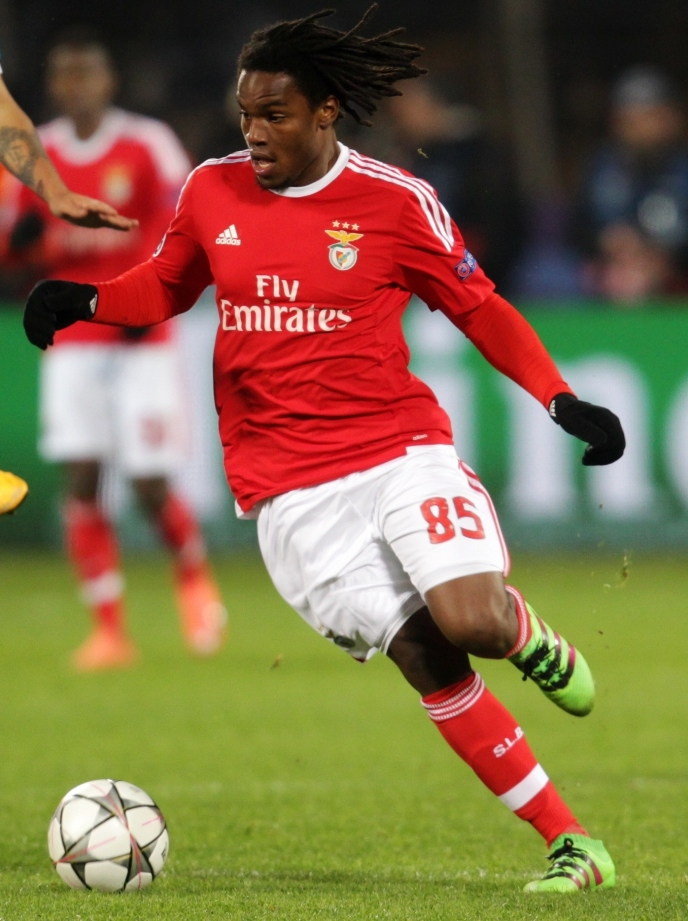
Sanches in a Champions League match with Benfica in 2016

Sanches made his professional debut in the 2014–15 campaign, with the B-team in the second division. He made his first appearance in the competition on 5 October 2014, starting and playing the first half of the 2–2 away draw against Feirense. He was sent off twice with straight red cards in the second half of the season: as a substitute in a 3–2 home win over Porto B on 11 January 2015, and a starter in a 1–1 draw at Santa Clara on 7 March.

After one year with the reserve team, in 2015–16, Sanches was promoted to the first team, initially only for the training sessions. He remained playing in the reserves, and on 30 August 2015, he scored his first goal in their 2–1 loss at Varzim, opening the scoring within two minutes. Seventeen days later, he scored two penalty kicks in a 3–2 loss at Desportivo das Aves. On 21 October, in the UEFA Youth League, he scored in an away 11–1 group stage win over Galatasaray. Nine days later, Sanches made his debut for the first team, replacing striker Jonas in the 74th minute of a 4–0 win against Tondela.

After the international break in November 2015, Sanches signed a new contract with Benfica until 2021, with a release clause set at €45 million. On 25 November, he made his first appearance in the starting line-up, playing 90 minutes in a 2–2 away draw with Astana in the UEFA Champions League group stage. On the following Monday, Sanches started again, this time in a Primeira Liga win at Braga, receiving praise from the media for his performance. Aged 18, on 4 December, he scored his first goal for Benfica, beating Académica's goalkeeper Trigueira with a 30-metre strike and sealing the 3–0 league win. In so doing, he became Benfica's youngest player to score a home goal in the 21st century, at the Estádio da Luz. It was selected as the Goal of the Month.

Sanches added a second goal on 2 January, the match's only at Vitória de Guimarães in the league. On 24 April, he was a target of racism by some Rio Ave supporters, who made monkey noises when he was leaving the pitch after a 1–0 away victory. He responded to the provocation with a smile and moved his arms, mimicking a monkey. On 8 May, Sanches was sent off for a second yellow card in the first half of a 2–0 win at Marítimo, missing Benfica's last league match in which they retained their title at the expense of city rivals Sporting CP with victory over Nacional. In his last match, the 2016 Taça da Liga Final in Coimbra on 20 May, Benfica won the league cup 6–2 against Marítimo.

=== Bayern Munich ===
==== 2016–17 season ====
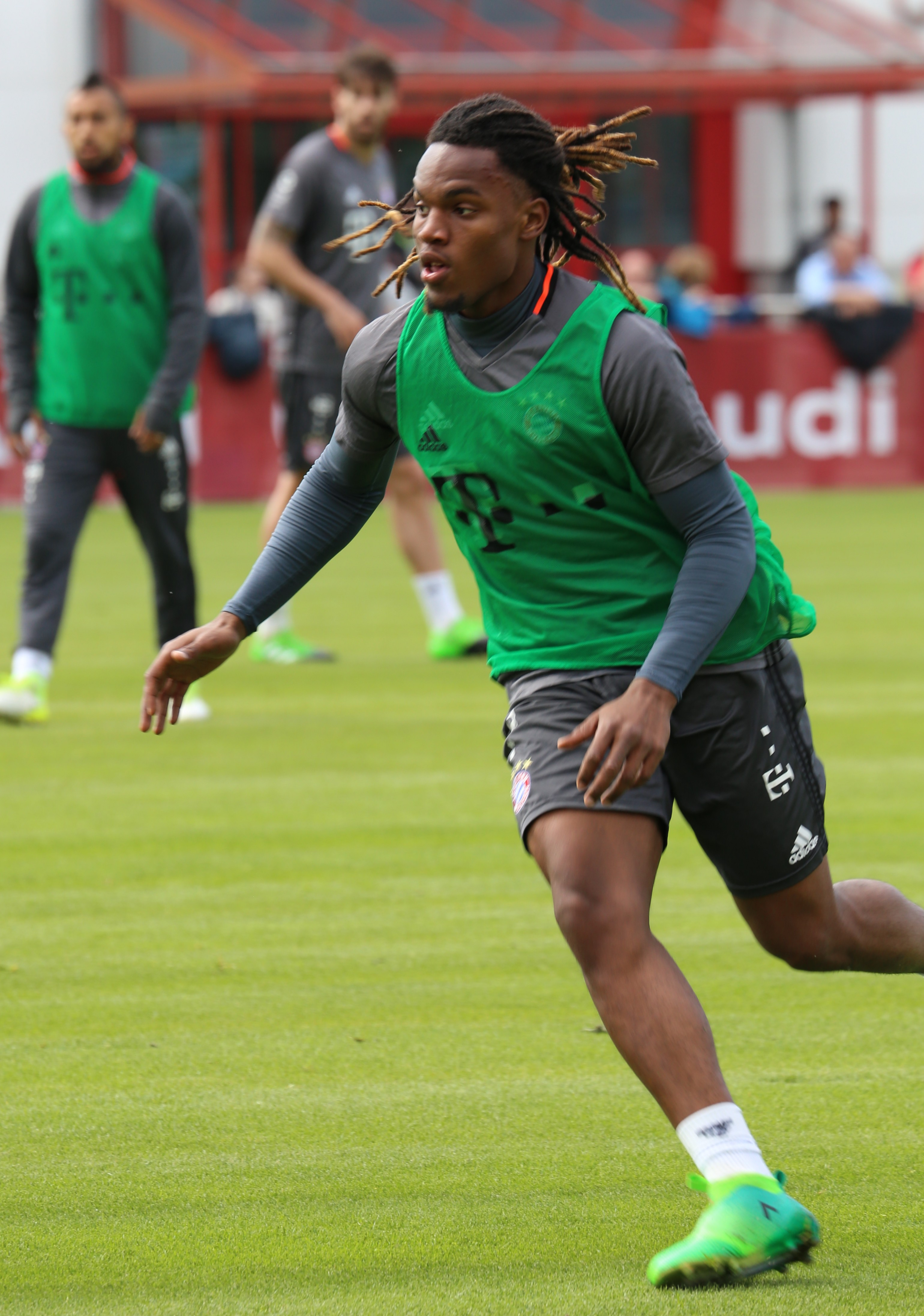
Sanches training with Bayern in May 2017

On 10 May 2016, Sanches signed a five-year contract effective from 1 July with German club Bayern Munich for €35 million, in a deal totalling €80 million, with the additional €45 million contingent on objectives. With this transfer, he became the most expensive Portuguese player to leave the domestic league, (Note: The record was previously held by three players who were each sold for €30 million: Ricardo Carvalho from Porto to Chelsea in 2004, Pepe from Porto to Real Madrid in 2007, and Fábio Coentrão from Benfica to Real Madrid in 2011. The record in regard to the initial fee was broken again in August 2016, when João Mário transferred from Sporting CP to Internazionale for €45 million.) as well as the first Portuguese player to join the Bavarian side. The initial fee was the fourth-highest paid in Bayern Munich's history, after those for Javi Martínez, Mario Götze and Arturo Vidal. Sanches had been tracked extensively by Manchester United before joining Bayern, and their Portuguese former player Nani said they would regret not completing a transfer for him.

After recovering from a thigh injury, Sanches made his debut on 9 September, starting in a 2–0 win at Schalke 04 in place of Arturo Vidal. Although he made errors in his 71 minutes before being replaced by Joshua Kimmich, he was given reassurance by captain Phillip Lahm and goalkeeper Manuel Neuer, with the former saying, "He's a very, very good player, otherwise he wouldn't be here. He's a European champion and will definitely be an asset to us in the future." On 24 October, he became the first Portuguese player to win the Golden Boy award for best European player under the age of 21, ahead of Manchester United's Marcus Rashford.

While Bayern won the Bundesliga, Sanches played only 25 matches across all competitions and did not record a single goal or assist. He started just four league games and playing the entirety of only one. Sanches had to compete with more experienced players like Arturo Vidal, Thiago and Xabi Alonso for playing time. It did not help Sanches that Bayern's manager, Carlo Ancelotti, has a reputation of not relying on young players. Sky Deutschland reporter Torben Hoffman said, "He has had problems with the language and found it hard to integrate with the team. There is also a lot of competition for places at Bayern." Former Bayern player Lothar Matthäus named him among the three worst players of the season, while Sanches himself said he was disappointed by his performances; however, manager Carlo Ancelotti said he would remain at the Allianz Arena for the following season.

==== Swansea City (loan) ====
On 31 August 2017, Sanches joined Premier League club Swansea City on a one-year loan lasting until 30 June 2018. Sanches was loaned to Swansea in order to play regularly in a strong league. He made his debut ten days later at the Liberty Stadium, in a 0–1 loss to Newcastle United. BBC Sport reporter Dafydd Pritchard called it a "mixed beginning" due to several passing mistakes. On 29 November, manager Paul Clement substituted Sanches at half-time in a 1–0 loss to Chelsea after he had played a pass into the advertising boards on the side of the pitch, believing it to be a teammate.

Sanches suffered hamstring injuries in two consecutive FA Cup matches in January 2018, and new manager Carlos Carvalhal allowed him to go home so the warmer weather could aid his rehabilitation. Sanches did not play a competitive match after 2 January 2018 until the end of the season. At the end of the season, Carvalhal said, "Renato knows he has had a very bad season. He is not at the level he was and when he had the injury in January, it finished him. Renato has a big talent, but he has much to learn. He stopped learning when he left Benfica and went to one of the biggest clubs in the world."

==== 2018–19 season ====
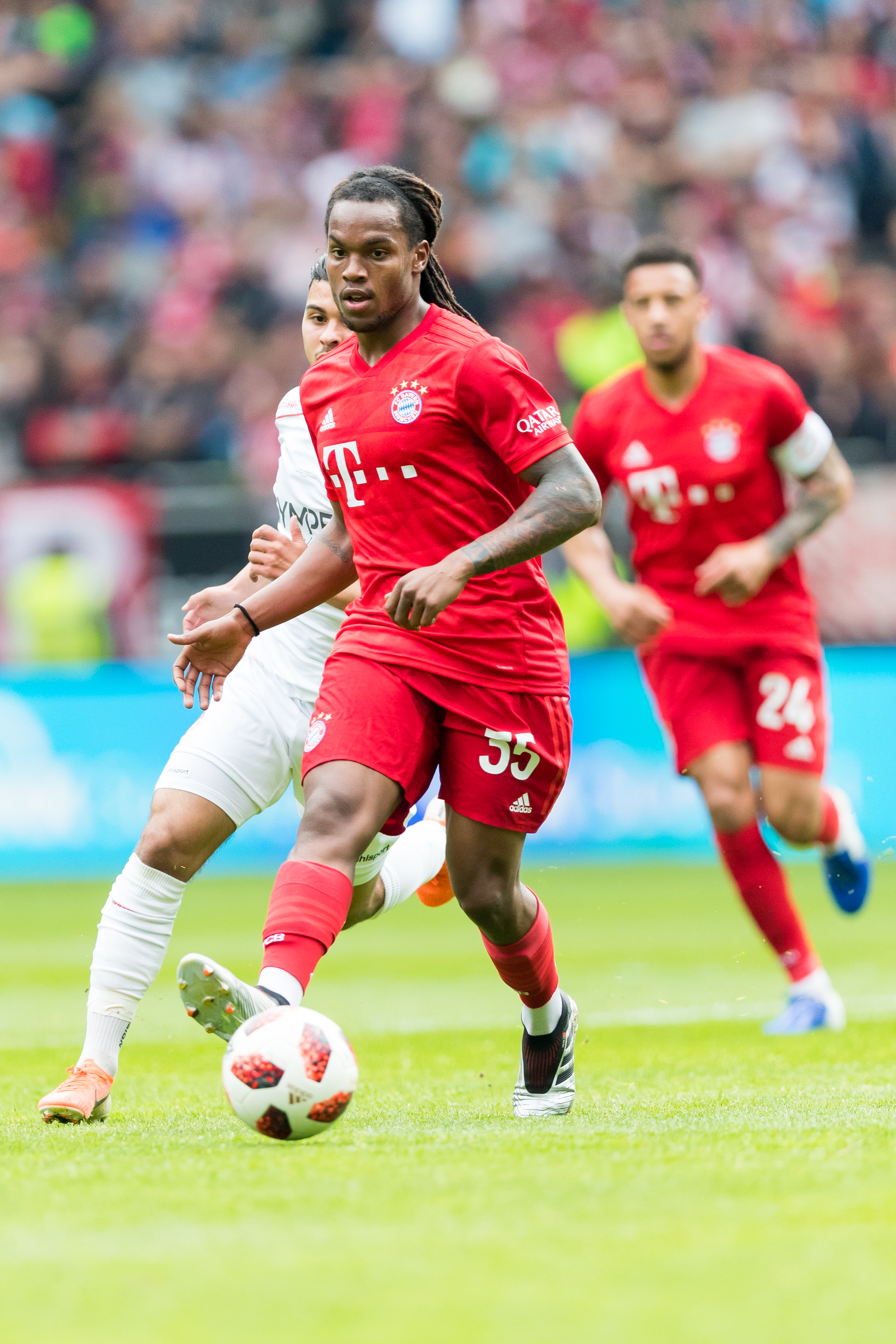
Sanches playing for Bayern in August 2019

On 1 July 2018, Sanches returned to Bayern Munich. New Bayern manager Niko Kovač said at the beginning of pre-season training, "I'll try to make him feel good here. When someone feels good, it's much easier to perform well. He has skills that you don't see every day in the Bundesliga; that's why FC Bayern signed him." Given a first Bayern start since May 2017, Sanches scored his first goal for the club on 19 September, finishing James Rodríguez's cross in a 2–0 Champions League group win at his former club Benfica. His return to good form was indeed sustained by being elected Bayern's best player of September. On 19 December 2018, Sanches was sent-off against RB Leipzig. Sanches scored his first Bundesliga goal on 18 May, on the final day of the league campaign, appearing as a substitute for Leon Goretzka in a 5–0 win over Eintracht Frankfurt to seal the title; as Bayern finished two points above Dortmund with 78 points. A week later, Sanches won his first DFB-Pokal as Bayern defeated RB Leipzig 3–0 in the 2019 DFB-Pokal Final. Sanches did not appear in the match.

==== 2019–20 season ====
On 16 August 2019, Sanches appeared as a late substitute for Thomas Müller in a 2–2 draw against Hertha Berlin. After the match, in a post-game interview, Sanches made it clear that he wanted to leave the club, to play more regularly. Afterwards, Sanches missed a post-game training and went home, which resulted in him being fined €10,000. Bayern's chairman Karl-Heinz Rummenigge responded to Sanches comments saying "it's not appropriate when one runs off in anger right after the first or second game. He would do well to keep calm. He'll get his chances".

=== Lille ===
==== 2019–20 season ====
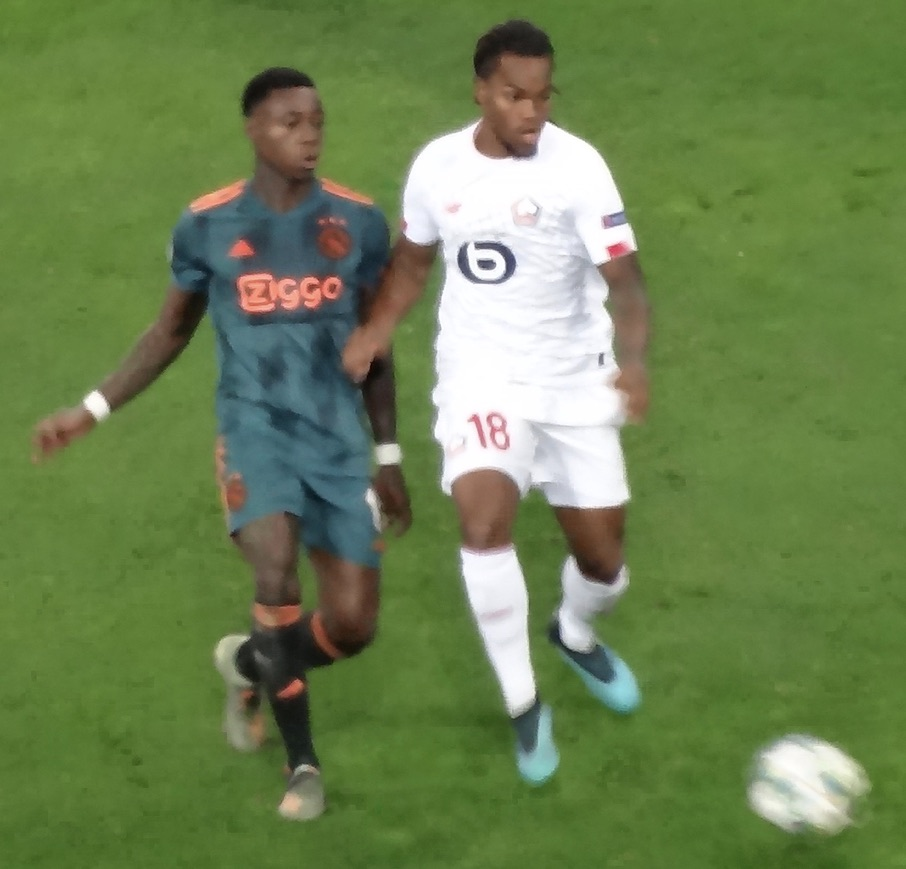
Sanches playing for Lille against Ajax Amsterdam in 2019

On 23 August 2019, Sanches joined French club Lille on a four-year contract for a reported fee of €20 million, becoming Lille's most expensive signing ever. He made his debut on 1 September, starting in a 2–0 loss at Reims. Initially, Lille's manager Christophe Galtier used Sanches in a variety of positions, being limited to substitute appearances, before playing a match as a starter for the club on 30 November in a 1–0 against Dijon, operating on the left of the midfield. He scored his first goal for the club on 13 December in a 2–0 victory against Montpellier.

In November, Sanches suffered a hamstring injury, which sidelined him for five weeks. After recovering from his injury, he earned a starting spot in the midfield, making his return in a 1–0 win against Nîmes. His impressive performances in the midfield alongside Jonathan Bamba and Jonathan Ikoné, led to Sanches being named Lille's Player of the Month in December and January in two consecutive months. He eventually contributed to 30 appearances, scoring 4 goals, helping Lille to a 4th-place finish, as the season finished early due to the COVID-19 pandemic.

==== 2020–21 season ====
In his second season at the club, Sanches formed a partnership in the midfield alongside Benjamin André in a double pivot. However, he suffered another hamstring injury in November, leading him to lose his place in the team to Boubakary Soumaré. Nevertheless, Sanches remained an important player for Lille, making 29 appearances, and providing a crucial assist for Jonathan David in a 2–1 away win over Angers, to win the 2020–21 Ligue 1 with Lille, ending the club's 10-year league title drought.

==== 2021–22 season ====
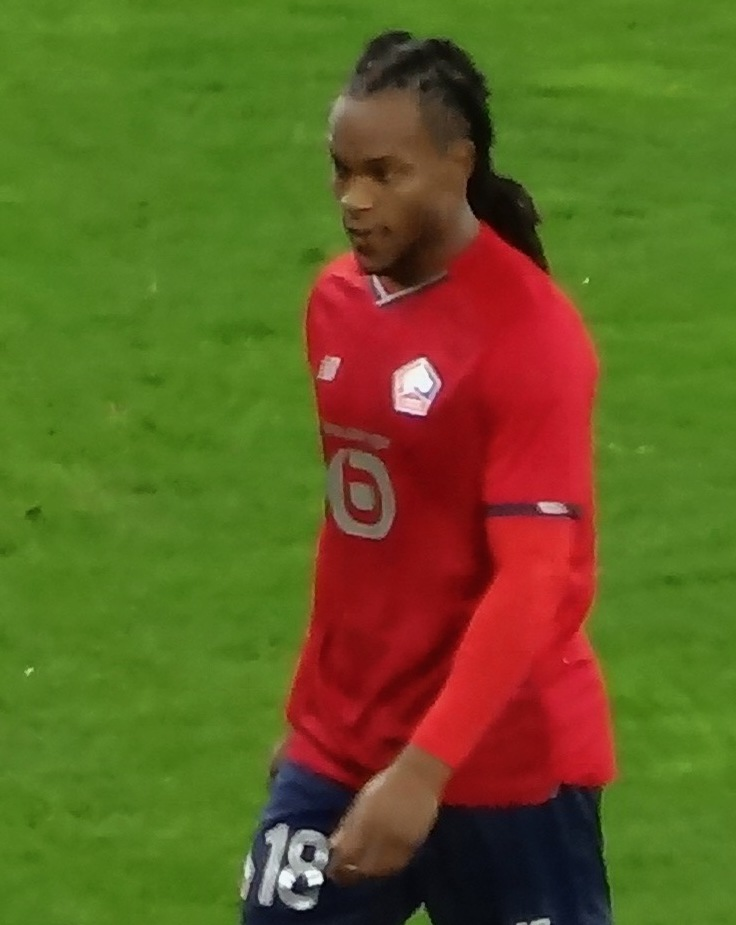
Sanches playing for Lille in 2021

At the start of the season in August, Sanches was sidelined with a hamstring injury, which required surgery, missing seven weeks of the season. In August, Barcelona negotiated with Lille for the transfer of Sanches, but his injury, led to the transfer collapsing at the final stages. He made his return on 3 October, replacing Jonathan Ikoné in the 94th minute in a 2–0 win against Marseille. On 1 December, Sanches scored his first goal of the season in a 2–1 win against Rennes.

=== Paris Saint-Germain ===
On 4 August 2022, Sanches signed for Paris Saint-Germain (PSG) on a permanent deal until 30 June 2027. The transfer fee paid to Lille was of €10 million, with a potential €3 million in bonuses. On 13 August, he came on as a substitute in a 5–2 home league win over Montpellier, making his PSG debut. He scored his team's fifth goal moments after having come on the pitch.

==== Loan to Roma ====
On 16 August 2023, Sanches signed for Serie A club Roma on a season-long loan with an option to make the move permanent that would become obligatory under certain conditions. It was reported by journalist Fabrizio Romano that Roma had paid a €1 million loan fee, that the buy option was set at €15 million, and that the option would become mandatory should Sanches play at least 60% of Roma's matches during the season.

==== Return to Benfica ====
On 5 August 2024, Sanches returned to Benfica on loan, with the option to make the move permanent. The deal was part of a transfer with Benfica midfielder João Neves moving in the other direction on a permanent move.

==== Loan to Panathinaikos ====
On 24 August 2025, Sanches joined the Greek club Panathinaikos on a season-long loan deal. Upon his return to PSG, his contract was terminated.

== International career ==
Sanches gained 40 caps for Portugal all youth categories comprised. He represented Portugal in the 2014 UEFA European Under-17 Championship, helping them reach the semi-finals, where they lost to eventual winners, England. He was named in the Team of the Tournament.

On 18 March 2016, Sanches was called up by Fernando Santos for the senior squad to play friendlies against Bulgaria and Belgium. He debuted for Portugal as a 76th-minute substitute for William Carvalho in the 0–1 loss against Bulgaria in Leiria, and shortly after he was greeted by a fan who invaded the pitch.

=== UEFA Euro 2016 ===
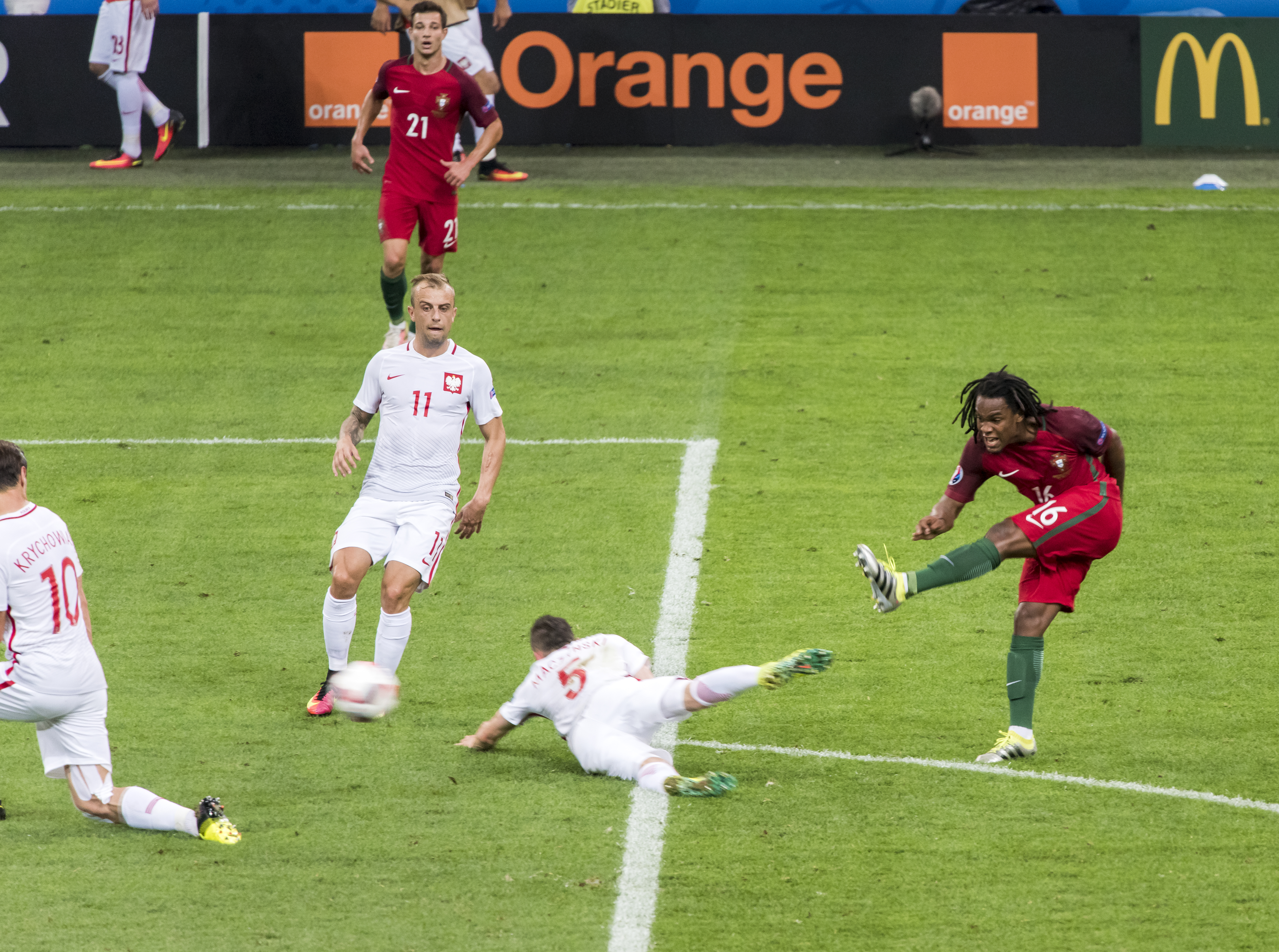
Sanches scoring the equaliser for Portugal against Poland at UEFA Euro 2016

Sanches was called up for UEFA Euro 2016, making him the youngest Portuguese to be selected for an international competition, breaking a record held by Cristiano Ronaldo for 12 years. Sanches made his competitive debut on 14 June in the team's opening match against Iceland in Saint-Étienne, replacing João Moutinho for the final 19 minutes of a 1–1 draw. He contributed to the only goal of the match in a 1–0 extra-time victory in the round of 16 against Croatia on 25 June, and was elected man of the match. Observing that performance, former Portuguese international António Sousa said, "When he's on the ball you don't notice how young he is. Physically and mentally, he is more than ready," while Fernando Santos exalted Sanches as a player immune to pressure.

Five days later in the quarter-finals against Poland, Sanches overtook Ronaldo's record as the youngest Portuguese to start in a major tournament. After a one-two with Nani, Sanches shot from outside the box and equalised in the first half to become the youngest player to score in a knockout match at a UEFA European Championship and the third-youngest overall. Following the 1–1 draw, he scored Portugal's second attempt in their penalty shootout victory, and was again elected man of the match. Following the match, teammates Nani and José Fonte praised Sanches' stamina, confidence and desire to learn from his elders. After his nation's 1–0 extra-time victory over hosts France in the final of the tournament, Sanches received the Young Player of the Tournament Award for his performances.

=== Post-Euro 2016 and Euro 2020 ===
Sanches and striker Eder were notable Euro 2016 winners omitted from Portugal's squad for the 2017 FIFA Confederations Cup in Russia; Sanches played in the 2017 UEFA European Under-21 Championship instead. He was also absent from the 35-man preliminary squad for the 2018 FIFA World Cup.

In September 2018, Sanches was called up for the friendly match against Croatia and the UEFA Nations League match against Italy. On 6 September, he came on as a substitute in the 86th minute against Croatia for his first international cap in nearly 18 months.

Sanches was named in Portugal's final squad for the delayed UEFA Euro 2020 tournament. On 15 June 2021, in Portugal's first game of Euro 2020, Sanches made his first appearance in tournament, replacing William Carvalho in the 81st minute, creating Portugal's first goal in a 3–0 win against Hungary in Budapest. Following the bad performances of teammates Danilo Pereira and William Carvalho in a 4–2 loss against Germany, Sanches emerged as one of the crucial players for Portugal in the competition, with coach Fernando Santos giving him a chance in Portugal's final two games at the tournament, impressing in a 2–2 draw with France in their final group stage match. Following another impressive performance, Portugal were eliminated on 27 June, following a 1–0 loss against Belgium in the round of 16, despite Sanches being distinguished for his breakthrough performances in the competition.

In October 2022, he was named in Portugal's preliminary 55-man squad for the 2022 FIFA World Cup in Qatar however he was omitted from the final 26-man squad. He was also not named in the 26-man squad for UEFA Euro 2024.

== Style of play ==
Sanches has been noted for his versatility in midfield, being comfortable in defensive, attacking, central and wide roles. His attributes include physical strength, passing ability, and being composed in possession. For these traits and his hairstyle, he has been likened to the Dutchman Edgar Davids.

However, in an interview to Benfica TV, Sanches compared his style with that of another Dutchman of Davids' era, Clarence Seedorf. During Euro 2016, former Benfica and Netherlands player Pierre van Hooijdonk also drew comparison with Seedorf, saying "the way [they] play is the same, the intensity also".

During his time with Lille, under manager Christophe Galtier, Sanches was deployed in a double pivot alongside Benjamin André in a 4-2-3-1 formation, or as an inverted midfielder, operating in an attacking role on the right-wing. Sanches also operated on the left of the midfield or in the middle, coming on the right side to play alongside Jonathan Bamba and Jonathan Ikoné in attack or as a box-to-box, supporting the full-back in defense in a 4-4-2 formation.

== Personal life ==
Sanches' cousins, Cláudio, Miguel and Jair Tavares, are also professional footballers.

=== Age controversy ===
In March 2016, as Sporting CP challenged Benfica for the Primeira Liga title, Sporting's then-president, Bruno de Carvalho, falsely accused Sanches of being older than his birth certificate states, citing the gap between his birth and its registration as evidence. Sanches requested that Carvalho publicly apologise or face defamation lawsuit. Months later, during Euro 2016, former French manager Guy Roux made a similar accusation. Goal.com writer Miles Chambers argued that the claim stemmed from racial stereotyping based on historical instances in which players from the African continent had lied about their ages, even though Sanches himself was born in Portugal.

On 8 July 2016, the hospital where Sanches was born published documentation proving that he was born on 18 August 1997.

== Career statistics ==
=== Club ===
As of 17 May 2026

Appearances and goals by club, season and competition
Club	Season	League			National cup (Note: Includes DFB-Pokal, FA Cup, Coupe de France, Coppa Italia, Taça de Portugal and Greek Cup)		League cup (Note: Includes Taça da Liga, EFL Cup and Coupe de la Ligue)		Europe		Other		Total	
Club	Season	Division	Apps	Goals	Apps	Goals	Apps	Goals	Apps	Goals	Apps	Goals	Apps	Goals
Benfica B	2014–15	LigaPro	24	0	—		—		—		—		24	0
Benfica B	2015–16	LigaPro	10	3	—		—		—		—		10	3
Benfica B	Total		34	3	—		—		—		—		34	3
Benfica	2015–16	Primeira Liga	24	2	0	0	5	0	6 (Note: Appearances in UEFA Champions League)	0	—		35	2
Bayern Munich	2016–17	Bundesliga	17	0	2	0	—		6	0	0	0	25	0
Bayern Munich	2017–18	Bundesliga	0	0	0	0	—		—		1 (Note: Appearance in DFL-Supercup)	0	1	0
Bayern Munich	2018–19	Bundesliga	17	1	1	0	—		6	1	0	0	24	2
Bayern Munich	2019–20	Bundesliga	1	0	1	0	—		—		1	0	3	0
Bayern Munich	Total		35	1	4	0	—		12	1	2	0	53	2
Swansea City (loan)	2017–18	Premier League	12	0	2	0	1	0	—		—		15	0
Lille	2019–20	Ligue 1	19	3	3	0	3	1	5	0	—		30	4
Lille	2020–21	Ligue 1	23	1	2	0	—		4 (Note: Appearances in UEFA Europa League)	0	—		29	1
Lille	2021–22	Ligue 1	25	2	2	0	—		5	0	0	0	32	2
Lille	Total		67	6	7	0	3	1	14	0	0	0	91	7
Paris Saint-Germain	2022–23	Ligue 1	23	2	1	0	—		3	0	—		27	2
Roma (loan)	2023–24	Serie A	7	1	0	0	—		5	0	—		12	1
Benfica (loan)	2024–25	Primeira Liga	10	0	1	0	3	0	4	0	3 (Note: Appearances in FIFA Club World Cup)	1	21	1
Panathinaikos (loan)	2025–26	Super League Greece	14	1	3	0	—		7	0	—		24	1
Career total			226	16	18	0	14	1	49	1	5	1	312	19

=== International ===
Appearances and goals by national team and year
National team	Year	Apps	Goals
Portugal	2016	12	1
Portugal	2017	1	0
Portugal	2018	5	0
Portugal	2019	0	0
Portugal	2020	4	1
Portugal	2021	10	1
Total		32	3

List of international goals scored by Renato Sanches
No.	Date	Venue	Opponent	Score	Result	Competition
1	30 June 2016	Stade Vélodrome, Marseille, France	Poland	1–1	1–1 (a.e.t.)	UEFA Euro 2016
2	11 November 2020	Estádio da Luz, Lisbon, Portugal	Andorra	3–0	7–0	Friendly
3	14 November 2021	Estádio da Luz, Lisbon, Portugal	Serbia	1–0	1–2	2022 FIFA World Cup qualification

== Honours ==
Benfica

- Primeira Liga: 2015–16
- Taça da Liga: 2015–16, 2024–25

Bayern Munich

- Bundesliga: 2016–17, 2018–19
- DFB-Pokal: 2018–19
- DFL-Supercup: 2017

Lille

- Ligue 1: 2020–21

Paris Saint-Germain

- Ligue 1: 2022–23

Portugal

- UEFA European Championship: 2016

Individual

- UEFA European Under-17 Championship Team of the Tournament: 2014
- SJPF Young Player of the Month: December 2015
- Primeira Liga Goal of the Month: December 2015
- CNID Awards – Revelation of the Year: 2016
- UEFA European Championship Young Player of the Tournament: 2016
- Primeira Liga Breakthrough Player: 2015–16
- Primeira Liga Best Goal: 2015–16
- Golden Boy: 2016
- UEFA Champions League Breakthrough XI: 2016
- FPF Revelation Player of the Year: 2016

Orders

- Commander of the Order of Merit
