= Miguel Tavares (footballer, born 1998) =

Portuguese footballer

Personal information
- Full name: Miguel Ângelo Almeida Vieira Tavares
- Date of birth: 29 August 1998 (age 28)
- Place of birth: Lisbon, Portugal
- Height: 1.70 m (5 ft 7 in)
- Position: Winger

Team information
- Current team: Vizela
- Number: 17

Youth career
- 2006–2007: Casa Pia
- 2007–2008: Belenenses
- 2008–2012: Sporting
- 2012–2013: Belenenses
- 2013–2014: Linda-a-Velha
- 2014–2016: Real
- 2016–2017: Braga

Senior career*
Years	Team	Apps	(Gls)
2017–2018	Mirandela	19	(4)
2018–2020	Desportivo Aves	21	(0)
2020	→ Penafiel (loan)	3	(0)
2020–2021	Casa Pia	3	(0)
2021–2022	Santarém	13	(2)
2022–2024	Belenenses	37	(0)
2024–	Vizela	27	(3)
2025	→ Puerto Cabello (loan)	13	(1)
- * Club domestic league appearances and goals as of 4 February 2026

Miguel Ângelo Almeida Vieira Tavares (born 29 August 1998) is a Portuguese professional footballer who plays as a winger for Liga Portugal 2 club Vizela.

== Football career ==
On 18 February 2019, Tavares made his professional debut with Aves in a 2018–19 Primeira Liga match against Benfica.

In June 2024, Tavares joined Liga Portugal 2 side Vizela on an initial one-year contract.

== Personal life ==
Born in Portugal, Tavares is of Cape Verdean descent. His brothers Cláudio and Jair Tavares, and his cousin Renato Sanches are also professional footballers.
