= Alcantarilha e Pêra =

- Civil parish
- Location in Portugal
- Coordinates: 37.130°N 8.346°W
- Country: Portugal
- Region: Algarve
- Intermunic. comm.: Algarve
- District: Faro
- Municipality: Silves

Area
  - Total: 46.26 km^{2} (17.86 sq mi)

Population (2011)
  - Total: 4,972
  - Density: 107.5/km^{2} (278.4/sq mi)
- Time zone: UTC+00:00 (WET)
  - Summer (DST): UTC+01:00 (WEST)

Alcantarilha e Pêra is a civil parish in the municipality of Silves, Portugal. It was formed in 2013 by the merger of the former parishes Alcantarilha and Pêra. The population in 2011 was 4,972, in an area of 46.26 km^{2}.
