= 2022–23 Scottish League Cup =

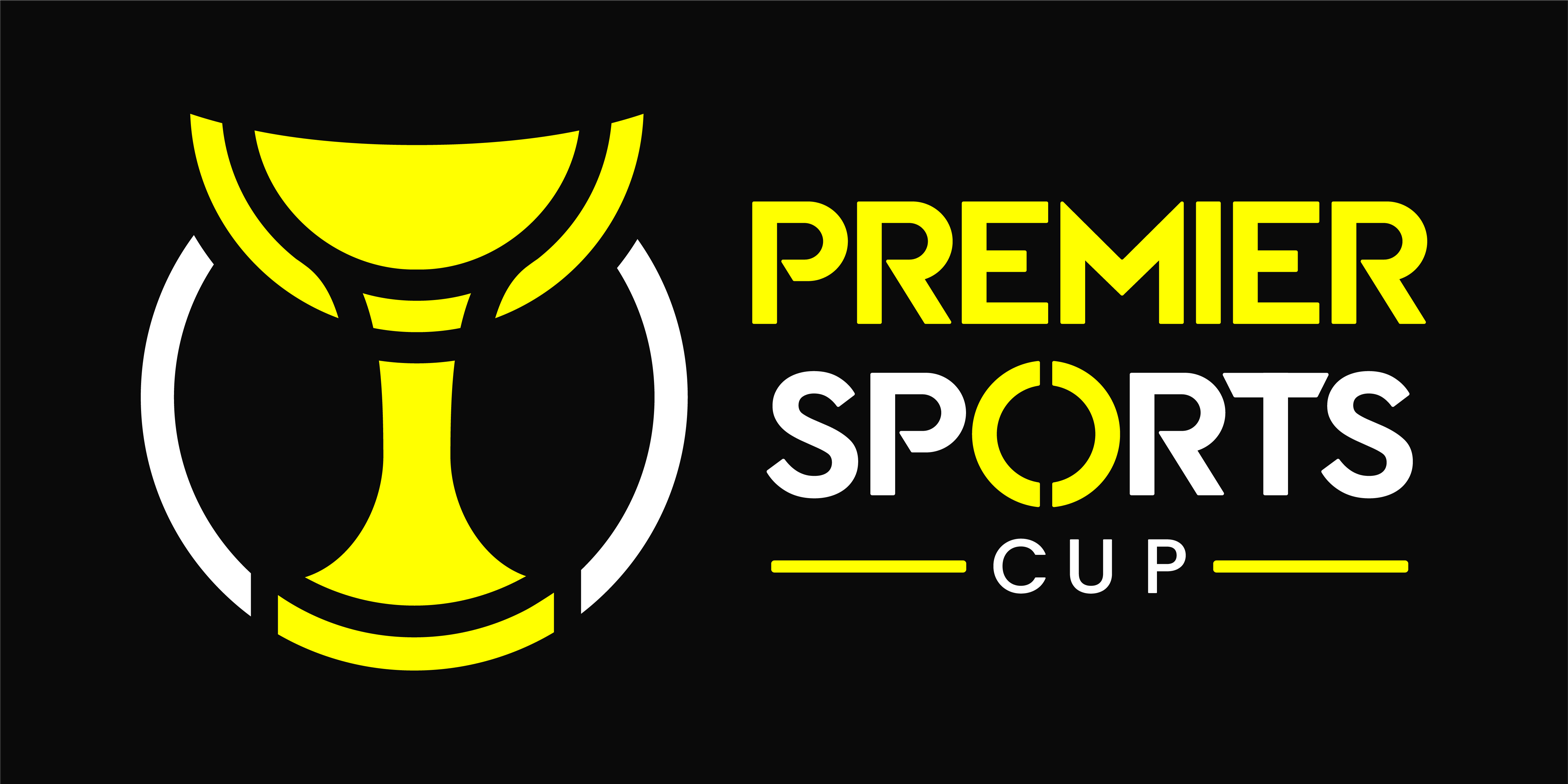
- Premier Sports Cup logo

Tournament details
- Country: Scotland
- Dates: 9 July 2022 – 26 February 2023
- Teams: 45

Final positions
- Champions: Celtic (21st title)
- Runners-up: Rangers

Tournament statistics
- Matches played: 95
- Goals scored: 296 (3.12 per match)
- Top goal scorer(s): 5 players (4 goals)

The 2022–23 Scottish League Cup, also known as the Premier Sports Cup (until the semi-finals)/ Viaplay Cup (final) for sponsorship reasons, was the 77th season of Scotland's second-most prestigious football knockout competition. Celtic were the defending champions. They retained the title to win the competition for a 21st time.

== Schedule ==
| Round | First match date | Fixtures | Clubs |
|---|---|---|---|
| Group stage | 9 July 2022 | 80 | 45 → 16 |
| Second round | 30 August 2022 | 8 | 16 → 8 |
| Quarter finals | 18 October 2022 | 4 | 8 → 4 |
| Semi finals | 14 January 2023 | 2 | 4 → 2 |
| Final | 26 February 2023 | 1 | 2 → 1 |

== Format ==
The format for the 2022–23 competition was similar to the previous six seasons; however, this season the group stage was not regionalised. The competition began with eight groups of five teams. The five clubs initially competing in the UEFA Champions League (Celtic and Rangers), Europa League (Heart of Midlothian) and Europa Conference League (Dundee United and Motherwell) qualifying rounds received a bye to the second round. The group stage consisted of 40 teams: all remaining teams that competed across the SPFL in 2021–22, and the 2021–22 Highland Football League champions (Fraserburgh) and runners-up (Buckie Thistle), and the 2021–22 Lowland Football League champions (Bonnyrigg Rose Athletic).

The winners of each of the eight groups, as well as the three best runners-up, progressed to the second round (last 16). At this stage, the competition reverted to the traditional knock-out format. The three group winners with the highest points total and the European entrants were seeded.

=== Bonus point system ===
The traditional point system of awarding three points for a win and one point for a draw was used; however, for each group stage match that finished in a draw, a penalty shoot-out took place, with the winner being awarded a bonus point.

== Group stage ==
The teams were seeded according to their final league positions in 2021–22 and drawn into eight groups, with each group comprising one team from each pot. The draw for the group stage took place on 25 May 2022 and was broadcast live on FreeSports & the SPFL YouTube channel.

=== Group A ===
| Pos | Team | Pld | W | PW | PL | L | GF | GA | GD | Pts | Qualification | ABE | STI | RAI | DUM | PET |
|---|---|---|---|---|---|---|---|---|---|---|---|---|---|---|---|---|
| 1 | Aberdeen | 4 | 4 | 0 | 0 | 0 | 12 | 0 | +12 | 12 | Qualification for the second round | — | — | 3–0 | 2–0 | — |
| 2 | Stirling Albion | 4 | 2 | 1 | 0 | 1 | 6 | 7 | −1 | 8 | | 0–5 | — | — | — | 3–0 |
| 3 | Raith Rovers | 4 | 1 | 1 | 1 | 1 | 7 | 4 | +3 | 6 | | — | 1–1p | — | — | 6–0 |
| 4 | Dumbarton | 4 | 1 | 0 | 1 | 2 | 3 | 4 | −1 | 4 | | — | 1–2 | 0–0p | — | — |
| 5 | Peterhead | 4 | 0 | 0 | 0 | 4 | 0 | 13 | −13 | 0 | | 0–2 | — | — | 0–2 | — |

Rules for classification: 1) goal difference, 2) goals scored, 3) away goals scored, 4) matches won, 5) away matches won, 6) drawing of lots.

=== Group B ===
| Pos | Team | Pld | W | PW | PL | L | GF | GA | GD | Pts | Qualification | PAR | KIL | STE | MON | FRA |
|---|---|---|---|---|---|---|---|---|---|---|---|---|---|---|---|---|
| 1 | Partick Thistle | 4 | 3 | 1 | 0 | 0 | 9 | 4 | +5 | 11 | Qualification for the second round | — | — | — | 4–2 | 2–0 |
| 2 | Kilmarnock | 4 | 3 | 0 | 1 | 0 | 11 | 3 | +8 | 10 | Qualification for the second round | 1–1p | — | 4–1 | — | — |
| 3 | Stenhousemuir | 4 | 2 | 0 | 0 | 2 | 7 | 6 | +1 | 6 | | 1–2 | — | — | — | 3–0 |
| 4 | Montrose | 4 | 1 | 0 | 0 | 3 | 6 | 11 | −5 | 3 | | — | 0–3 | 0–2 | — | — |
| 5 | Fraserburgh | 4 | 0 | 0 | 0 | 4 | 3 | 12 | −9 | 0 | | — | 1–3 | — | 2–4 | — |

Rules for classification: 1) goal difference, 2) goals scored, 3) away goals scored, 4) matches won, 5) away matches won, 6) drawing of lots.

=== Group C ===
| Pos | Team | Pld | W | PW | PL | L | GF | GA | GD | Pts | Qualification | ROS | DNF | ALL | EFI | BUC |
|---|---|---|---|---|---|---|---|---|---|---|---|---|---|---|---|---|
| 1 | Ross County | 4 | 3 | 1 | 0 | 0 | 11 | 1 | +10 | 11 | Qualification for the second round | — | 1–0 | — | 7–0 | — |
| 2 | Dunfermline Athletic | 4 | 2 | 0 | 1 | 1 | 8 | 2 | +6 | 7 | | — | — | 1–1p | — | 5–0 |
| 3 | Alloa Athletic | 4 | 1 | 2 | 0 | 1 | 6 | 5 | +1 | 7 | | 0–2 | — | — | p1–1 | — |
| 4 | East Fife | 4 | 1 | 0 | 1 | 2 | 4 | 12 | −8 | 4 | | — | 0–2 | — | — | 3–2 |
| 5 | Buckie Thistle | 4 | 0 | 0 | 1 | 3 | 4 | 13 | −9 | 1 | | 1–1p | — | 1–4 | — | — |

Rules for classification: 1) goal difference, 2) goals scored, 3) away goals scored, 4) matches won, 5) away matches won, 6) drawing of lots.

=== Group D ===
| Pos | Team | Pld | W | PW | PL | L | GF | GA | GD | Pts | Qualification | FAL | GMO | HIB | BON | CLY |
|---|---|---|---|---|---|---|---|---|---|---|---|---|---|---|---|---|
| 1 | Falkirk | 4 | 2 | 2 | 0 | 0 | 3 | 1 | +2 | 10 | Qualification for the second round | — | — | 1–0 | — | 1–0 |
| 2 | Greenock Morton | 4 | 2 | 0 | 1 | 1 | 6 | 3 | +3 | 7 | | 0–0p | — | — | 3–1 | — |
| 3 | Hibernian | 4 | 2 | 0 | 0 | 2 | 9 | 5 | +4 | 6 | | — | 0–3 (Note: Greenock Morton were awarded a technical 3−0 win over Hibernian, who fielded an ineligible player. The match had originally finished 1–1, with Greenock Morton securing the bonus point following a 3–1 win on penalties.) | — | — | 5–0 |
| 4 | Bonnyrigg Rose | 4 | 1 | 0 | 1 | 2 | 5 | 9 | −4 | 4 | | 1–1p | — | 1–4 | — | — |
| 5 | Clyde | 4 | 1 | 0 | 0 | 3 | 3 | 8 | −5 | 3 | | — | 2–0 | — | 1–2 | — |

Rules for classification: 1) goal difference, 2) goals scored, 3) away goals scored, 4) matches won, 5) away matches won, 6) drawing of lots.

=== Group E ===
| Pos | Team | Pld | W | PW | PL | L | GF | GA | GD | Pts | Qualification | ARB | AIR | STM | EDI | COW |
|---|---|---|---|---|---|---|---|---|---|---|---|---|---|---|---|---|
| 1 | Arbroath | 4 | 4 | 0 | 0 | 0 | 10 | 1 | +9 | 12 | Qualification for the second round | — | 3–0 | — | — | 3–0 |
| 2 | Airdrieonians | 4 | 2 | 0 | 1 | 1 | 6 | 4 | +2 | 7 | | — | — | 2–0 | 1–1p | — |
| 3 | St Mirren | 4 | 2 | 0 | 0 | 2 | 5 | 4 | +1 | 6 | | 0–1 | — | — | 3–1 | — |
| 4 | Edinburgh | 4 | 1 | 1 | 0 | 2 | 6 | 7 | −1 | 5 | | 1–3 | — | — | — | 3–0 |
| 5 | Cowdenbeath | 4 | 0 | 0 | 0 | 4 | 0 | 11 | −11 | 0 | | — | 0–3 | 0–2 | — | — |

Rules for classification: 1) goal difference, 2) goals scored, 3) away goals scored, 4) matches won, 5) away matches won, 6) drawing of lots.

=== Group F ===
| Pos | Team | Pld | W | PW | PL | L | GF | GA | GD | Pts | Qualification | ANN | QOS | STJ | AYR | ELG |
|---|---|---|---|---|---|---|---|---|---|---|---|---|---|---|---|---|
| 1 | Annan Athletic | 4 | 2 | 2 | 0 | 0 | 8 | 3 | +5 | 10 | Qualification for the second round | — | — | — | p1–1 | 4–0 |
| 2 | Queen of the South | 4 | 2 | 1 | 0 | 1 | 9 | 5 | +4 | 8 | Qualification for the second round | 2–3 | — | p2–2 | — | — |
| 3 | St Johnstone | 4 | 2 | 0 | 2 | 0 | 7 | 4 | +3 | 8 | | 0–0p | — | — | 1–0 | — |
| 4 | Ayr United | 4 | 1 | 0 | 1 | 2 | 4 | 5 | −1 | 4 | | — | 0–3 | — | — | 3–0 (Note: Ayr United were awarded a technical 3−0 win over Elgin City, who fielded an ineligible player. The match had originally finished 0–0, with Ayr United securing the bonus point following a 4–3 win on penalties.) |
| 5 | Elgin City | 4 | 0 | 0 | 0 | 4 | 2 | 13 | −11 | 0 | | — | 0–2 | 2–4 | — | — |

Rules for classification: 1) goal difference, 2) goals scored, 3) away goals scored, 4) matches won, 5) away matches won, 6) drawing of lots.

=== Group G ===
| Pos | Team | Pld | W | PW | PL | L | GF | GA | GD | Pts | Qualification | ICT | LIV | COV | ALB | KEL |
|---|---|---|---|---|---|---|---|---|---|---|---|---|---|---|---|---|
| 1 | Inverness Caledonian Thistle | 4 | 3 | 1 | 0 | 0 | 8 | 2 | +6 | 11 | Qualification for the second round | — | — | p1–1 | 4–0 | — |
| 2 | Livingston | 4 | 3 | 0 | 0 | 1 | 8 | 5 | +3 | 9 | Qualification for the second round | 1–2 | — | — | — | 2–0 |
| 3 | Cove Rangers | 4 | 1 | 0 | 1 | 2 | 6 | 7 | −1 | 4 | | — | 1–2 | — | — | 2–3 |
| 4 | Albion Rovers | 4 | 1 | 0 | 0 | 3 | 5 | 9 | −4 | 3 | | — | 2–3 | 1–2 | — | — |
| 5 | Kelty Hearts | 4 | 1 | 0 | 0 | 3 | 3 | 7 | −4 | 3 | | 0–1 | — | — | 0–2 | — |

Rules for classification: 1) goal difference, 2) goals scored, 3) away goals scored, 4) matches won, 5) away matches won, 6) drawing of lots.

=== Group H ===
| Pos | Team | Pld | W | PW | PL | L | GF | GA | GD | Pts | Qualification | DND | HAM | QPA | FOR | STR |
|---|---|---|---|---|---|---|---|---|---|---|---|---|---|---|---|---|
| 1 | Dundee | 4 | 4 | 0 | 0 | 0 | 13 | 2 | +11 | 12 | Qualification for the second round | — | 3–0 | — | 5–1 | — |
| 2 | Hamilton Academical | 4 | 2 | 1 | 0 | 1 | 9 | 6 | +3 | 8 | | — | — | p1–1 | — | 5–2 |
| 3 | Queen's Park | 4 | 2 | 0 | 1 | 1 | 11 | 6 | +5 | 7 | | 1–2 | — | — | 4–1 | — |
| 4 | Forfar Athletic | 4 | 1 | 0 | 0 | 3 | 5 | 12 | −7 | 3 | | — | 0–3 | — | — | 3–0 (Note: Forfar Athletic were awarded a technical 3−0 win over Stranraer, who fielded an ineligible player. The match had originally finished 2–2, with Forfar Athletic securing the bonus point following a 5–3 win on penalties.) |
| 5 | Stranraer | 4 | 0 | 0 | 0 | 4 | 4 | 16 | −12 | 0 | | 0–3 | — | 2–5 | — | — |

Rules for classification: 1) goal difference, 2) goals scored, 3) away goals scored, 4) matches won, 5) away matches won, 6) drawing of lots.

=== Best runners-up ===
| Pos | Grp | Team | Pld | W | PW | PL | L | GF | GA | GD | Pts | Qualification |
|---|---|---|---|---|---|---|---|---|---|---|---|---|
| 1 | B | Kilmarnock | 4 | 3 | 0 | 1 | 0 | 11 | 3 | +8 | 10 | Qualification for the second round |
| 2 | G | Livingston | 4 | 3 | 0 | 0 | 1 | 8 | 5 | +3 | 9 | Qualification for the second round |
| 3 | F | Queen of the South | 4 | 2 | 1 | 0 | 1 | 9 | 5 | +4 | 8 | Qualification for the second round |
| 4 | H | Hamilton Academical | 4 | 2 | 1 | 0 | 1 | 9 | 6 | +3 | 8 | |
| 5 | A | Stirling Albion | 4 | 2 | 1 | 0 | 1 | 6 | 7 | −1 | 8 | |
| 6 | C | Dunfermline Athletic | 4 | 2 | 0 | 1 | 1 | 8 | 2 | +6 | 7 | |
| 7 | D | Greenock Morton | 4 | 2 | 0 | 1 | 1 | 6 | 3 | +3 | 7 | |
| 8 | E | Airdrieonians | 4 | 2 | 0 | 1 | 1 | 6 | 4 | +2 | 7 | |

Rules for classification: 1) goal difference, 2) goals scored, 3) away goals scored, 4) matches won, 5) away matches won, 6) drawing of lots.

== Knockout phase ==
=== Second round ===
==== Draw and seeding ====
Celtic, Dundee United, Heart of Midlothian, Motherwell and Rangers entered the competition at this stage, due to their participation in UEFA club competitions.

The draw took place on 24 July 2022, following the Aberdeen v Raith Rovers match.

Teams in bold advanced to the quarter-finals.

| Seeded | Unseeded |
|---|---|
| **Aberdeen**; Arbroath†; **Celtic**; **Dundee**†; **Dundee United**; Heart of Midlothian; **Motherwell**; **Rangers** | Annan Athletic**; Falkirk*; Inverness Caledonian Thistle†; **Kilmarnock**; Livingston; **Partick Thistle**†; Queen of the South*; Ross County |

Notes

- † denotes teams playing in the Championship.
- * denotes team playing in League One.
- ** denotes team playing in League Two.

==== Matches ====
| 30 August 2022 | Annan Athletic | **1–4** (a.e.t.) | **Aberdeen** | Annan |
| 19:45 | Swinglehurst 81' | | Besuijen 55', 105'; Duk 97'; Clarkson 117' | Stadium: Galabank; Attendance: 1,538; Referee: Steven McLean |

| 30 August 2022 | **Dundee** | **3–0** | Falkirk | Dundee |
| 19:45 | Cameron 55'; Ashcroft 80'; Robinson 90' (pen.) | | | Stadium: Dens Park; Attendance: 3,195; Referee: Colin Steven |

| 30 August 2022 | **Partick Thistle** | **1–0** | Arbroath | Glasgow |
| 19:45 | Fitzpatrick 83' | | | Stadium: Firhill Stadium; Attendance: 1,960; Referee: John Beaton |

| 30 August 2022 | **Rangers** | **3–1** | Queen of the South | Glasgow |
| 19:45 | Ure 10'; Arfield 24', 86' | | Connelly 17' | Stadium: Ibrox Stadium; Attendance: 30,569; Referee: David Dickinson |

| 31 August 2022 | Heart of Midlothian | **0–1** | **Kilmarnock** | Edinburgh |
| 19:45 | | | Cameron 21' | Stadium: Tynecastle Park; Attendance: 11,071; Referee: Don Robertson |

| 31 August 2022 | Livingston | **1–2** | **Dundee United** | Livingston |
| 19:45 | Guthrie 78' | | Fletcher 15'; Harkes 34' | Stadium: Almondvale Stadium; Attendance: 1,497; Referee: David Munro |

| 31 August 2022 | **Motherwell** | **4–0** | Inverness Caledonian Thistle | Motherwell |
| 19:45 | Van Veen 9', 38' (pen.), 67' (pen.); Devine 26' (o.g.) | | | Stadium: Fir Park; Attendance: 3,982; Referee: Kevin Clancy |

| 31 August 2022 | Ross County | **1–4** | **Celtic** | Dingwall |
| 19:45 | Iacovitti 68' | | McGregor 21'; Giakoumakis 25'; Maeda 73'; Forrest 90' | Stadium: Victoria Park; Attendance: 4,801; Referee: Willie Collum |

=== Quarter-finals ===
The draw took place on 31 August 2022, following the Ross County v Celtic match.

==== Matches ====
| 18 October 2022 | **Kilmarnock** | **2–1** | Dundee United | Kilmarnock |
| 19:45 | Lafferty 8' (pen.); Armstrong 73' | | Middleton 10' | Stadium: Rugby Park; Attendance: 5,144; Referee: Kevin Clancy |

| 19 October 2022 | Motherwell | **0–4** | **Celtic** | Motherwell |
| 18:15 | | | Abada 44', 56'; Hatate 60'; Furuhashi 76' | Stadium: Fir Park; Attendance: 8,370; Referee: Don Robertson |

| 19 October 2022 | **Aberdeen** | **4–1** | Partick Thistle | Aberdeen |
| 19:45 | Duk 16'; Holt 31' (o.g.); Coulson 35'; Duncan 85' | | Brownlie 53' | Stadium: Pittodrie Stadium; Attendance: 9,323; Referee: David Munro |

| 19 October 2022 | **Rangers** | **1–0** | Dundee | Glasgow |
| 20:15 | Davis 10' | | | Stadium: Ibrox Stadium; Attendance: 37,107; Referee: Willie Collum |

=== Semi-finals ===
The draw took place on 19 October 2022, following the Rangers v Dundee match. VAR was used for the first time in the tournament when it was introduced at the semi-final stage.

==== Matches ====
| 14 January 2023 | **Celtic** | **2–0** | Kilmarnock | Glasgow |
| 17:30 | Maeda 18'; Giakoumakis 90+5' | | | Stadium: Hampden Park; Attendance: 45,787; Referee: Willie Collum |

| 15 January 2023 | **Rangers** | **2–1** (a.e.t.) | Aberdeen | Glasgow |
| 15:00 | Jack 61'; Roofe 94' | | Miovski 41' | Stadium: Hampden Park; Attendance: 47,562; Referee: Nick Walsh |

=== Final ===
26 February 2023
15:00

| Rangers | 1–2 | Celtic |
|---|---|---|
| Morelos 64' | Report | Furuhashi 44', 56' |

Hampden Park, Glasgow
Attendance: 49,529
Referee: Nick Walsh

== Media coverage ==
The domestic broadcasting rights for the competition are held exclusively by Premier Sports, who will broadcast between 12 and 16 live matches per season, as well as highlights.

The following matches were broadcast live on UK television:

| Round | Date | Match |
|---|---|---|
| Group stage | 10 July 2022 | Peterhead v Aberdeen |
| Group stage | 12 July 2022 | Falkirk v Hibernian |
| Group stage | 13 July 2022 | Kilmarnock v Partick Thistle |
| Group stage | 17 July 2022 | Bonnyrigg Rose Athletic v Hibernian |
| Group stage | 19 July 2022 | ~~Airdrieonians v St Mirren~~ |
| Group stage | 24 July 2022 | Aberdeen v Raith Rovers |
| Second round | 30 August 2022 | Rangers v Queen of the South |
| Second round | 31 August 2022 | Ross County v Celtic |
| Quarter-finals | 18 October 2022 | Kilmarnock v Dundee United |
| Quarter-finals | 19 October 2022 | Motherwell v Celtic |
| Quarter-finals | 19 October 2022 | Rangers v Dundee |
| Semi-finals | 14 January 2023 | Celtic v Kilmarnock |
| Semi-finals | 15 January 2023 | Rangers v Aberdeen |
| Final | 26 February 2023 | Rangers v Celtic |

== Top goalscorers ==
| Rank | Player | Club | Goals |
|---|---|---|---|
| 1 | (Netherlands) Vicente Besuijen | Aberdeen | 4 |
| 1 | (Republic of Ireland) Conor Sammon | Alloa Athletic | 4 |
| 1 | (Scotland) Alex Jakubiak | Dundee | 4 |
| 1 | (Scotland) Oli Shaw | Kilmarnock | 4 |
| 1 | (Kenya) Jonah Ayunga | St Mirren | 4 |
| 6 | 21 players | | 3 |
