= Josh Campbell (footballer) =

Scottish footballer

Personal information
- Date of birth: 6 May 2000 (age 26)
- Place of birth: Edinburgh, Scotland
- Height: 1.82 m (6 ft 0 in)
- Position: Midfielder

Team information
- Current team: St Johnstone (on loan from Hibernian)
- Number: 32

Youth career
- –2019: Hibernian

Senior career*
Years	Team	Apps	(Gls)
2019–	Hibernian	142	(20)
2019	→ Airdrieonians (loan)	14	(0)
2019–2020	→ Arbroath (loan)	9	(0)
2020–2021	→ Edinburgh City (loan)	20	(7)
2026–	→ St Johnstone (loan)	8	(3)

International career^{‡}
2022	Scotland U21	1	(0)
- * Club domestic league appearances and goals as of 08:42, 22 November 2026 (UTC) ‡ National team caps and goals as of 07:34, 26 March 2022 (UTC)

Josh Campbell (born 6 May 2000) is a Scottish professional footballer who plays as a midfielder for St Johnstone, on loan from Scottish Premiership club Hibernian. Campbell has previously played for Airdrieonians, Arbroath and Edinburgh City, and represented Scotland once at under-21 level.

== Club career ==
Born in Edinburgh, Campbell came through the youth system at Hibernian. He was loaned to Airdrieonians in January 2019, and made his first team debut for Hibs in a League Cup match against Stirling Albion in July 2019. He was loaned to Arbroath in August 2019.

In September 2020, Campbell was loaned to Edinburgh City. He helped them progress to the promotion play-off final with goals in both legs of the semi-final against Elgin City. Campbell ended his loan spell with Edinburgh City having scored nine goals in thirty games.

Following his return from his loan spell at Edinburgh City, Campbell came off the bench for Hibernian in their first leg of the UEFA Europa Conference League qualifiers against Andorran side FC Santa Coloma, in the second leg of the qualifying round Campbell played the full game for Hibernian in their 2–1 away win. Three days later Campbell made his league debut for Hibernian as he came off the bench in the club's 3–2 victory against Motherwell.

On 1 December 2021, Campbell signed a new long-term contract with Hibernian, running until 2025. Campbell scored his first goal for Hibernian in a 1–1 draw against St Mirren on 11 December 2021.

Campbell scored a hat-trick in a 6–0 win against Aberdeen on 28 January 2023. Speaking afterwards, Campbell said that it was the first time he had done that at any level since he played as a forward at school. He signed a new contract with Hibs in February 2023, with it due to run until the end of the 2026–27 season.

He signed on loan for St Johnstone in September 2026.

== International career ==
He was selected in the Scotland under-21 squad in March 2022.

== Career statistics ==
As of match played on 21 November 2026

Appearances and goals by club, season and competition
Club	Season	League			Cup		League Cup		Other		Total	
Club	Season	Division	Apps	Goals	Apps	Goals	Apps	Goals	Apps	Goals	Apps	Goals
Hibernian	2018–19	Scottish Premiership	0	0	0	0	0	0	0	0	0	0
Hibernian	2019–20	Scottish Premiership	0	0	0	0	2	0	—		2	0
Hibernian	2020–21	Scottish Premiership	0	0	0	0	0	0	—		0	0
Hibernian	2021–22	Scottish Premiership	26	1	4	0	2	0	3 (Note: Appearances in the UEFA Europa Conference League)	0	35	1
Hibernian	2022–23	Scottish Premiership	36	8	1	0	4	1	0	0	41	9
Hibernian	2023–24	Scottish Premiership	19	3	0	0	3	0	5	2	27	5
Hibernian	2024–25	Scottish Premiership	33	4	3	0	5	0	—		41	4
Hibernian	2025–26	Scottish Premiership	27	3	0	0	1	0	5 (Note: Appearances in the UEFA Europa League)	0	33	3
Hibernian	2026–27	Scottish Premiership	1	1	0	0	1	0	3 (Note: Appearances in UEFA Conference League qualifying)	0	5	1
Hibernian	Total		142	20	8	0	18	1	16	2	184	23
Airdrieonians (loan)	2018–19	Scottish League One	14	0	1	0	0	0	—		15	0
Arbroath (loan)	2019–20	Scottish Championship	9	0	2	0	0	0	—		11	0
Edinburgh City (loan)	2020–21	Scottish League Two	20	7	2	0	4	0	4 (Note: Appearances in the Scottish League One play-offs)	2	30	9
St Johnstone (loan)	2026–27	Scottish Premiership	8	3	0	0	0	0	0	0	8	3
Career total			193	30	13	0	22	1	20	4	248	35
