= Cláudio Tavares (footballer) =

Cape Verdean footballer

Personal information
- Full name: Cláudio Rafael da Veiga Vieira Tavares
- Date of birth: 23 March 1997 (age 29)
- Place of birth: Lisbon, Portugal
- Height: 1.79 m (5 ft 10 1/2 in)
- Position: Right-back

Team information
- Current team: União de Santarém

Youth career
- 2006–2007: Casa Pia
- 2007–2009: Belenenses
- 2009–2011: Benfica
- 2011–2012: Sporting
- 2012–2013: Os Sandinenses
- 2013–2016: Vitória Guimarães
- 2016–2017: Desportivo Aves

Senior career*
Years	Team	Apps	(Gls)
2017–2019	Desportivo Aves B	68	(1)
2017–2020	Desportivo Aves	1	(0)
2017–2018	→ Mirandela (loan)	22	(0)
2020–	União de Santarém	21	(0)

International career
2021–	Cape Verde	1	(0)
- * Club domestic league appearances and goals as of 19:12, 12 March 2020 (UTC)

Cláudio Rafael da Veiga Vieira Tavares (born 23 March 1997) is a professional footballer who plays as a right-back for União de Santarém. Born in Portugal, he plays for the Cape Verde national team.

== Club career ==
Tavares made his professional debut with Aves in a 2–1 Primeira Liga loss to S.L. Benfica on 10 January 2020.

== International career ==
Born in Portugal, Tavares is of Cape Verdean descent. He played for the Cape Verde national team in a 1–1 2022 FIFA World Cup qualification tie with Central African Republic on 1 September 2021.

== Personal life ==
Tavares' brother Miguel and Jair Tavares, and his cousin Renato Sanches are also professional footballers.
